= List of Canadian plants by family A =

Main page: List of Canadian plants by family

The following families of vascular plants are listed as occurring in Canada:

For mosses of Canada, see:

== Acanthaceae ==
- Justicia americana — common water-willow

== Aceraceae ==
- Acer circinatum — vine maple
- Acer glabrum — Douglas maple
- Acer macrophyllum — bigleaf maple
- Acer negundo — box-elder
- Acer nigrum — black maple
- Acer pensylvanicum — striped maple
- Acer rubrum — red maple
- Acer saccharinum — silver maple
- Acer saccharum — sugar maple
- Acer spicatum — mountain maple
- Acer × freemanii — Freeman's maple

== Acoraceae ==
- Acorus americanus — sweetflag

== Adelanthaceae ==
- Odontoschisma denudatum
- Odontoschisma elongatum
- Odontoschisma gibbsiae
- Odontoschisma macounii
- Odontoschisma sphagni

== Adoxaceae ==
- Adoxa moschatellina — muskroot
- Viburnum acerifolium — mapleleaf viburnum
- Viburnum edule — squashberry
- Viburnum lantanoides — alderleaf viburnum
- Viburnum lentago — nannyberry
- Viburnum nudum — possum-haw viburnum
- Viburnum opulus — guelder-rose viburnum
- Viburnum rafinesquianum — downy arrowwood
- Viburnum recognitum — northern arrowwood

== Agavaceae ==
- Yucca filamentosa — common yucca
- Yucca glauca — small soapweed yucca

== Alismataceae ==
- Alisma gramineum — narrowleaf water-plantain
- Alisma subcordatum — broad-leaved water-plantain
- Alisma triviale — northern water-plantain
- Sagittaria brevirostra — short-beaked arrowhead
- Sagittaria calycina — longlobe arrowhead
- Sagittaria cristata — crested arrowhead
- Sagittaria cuneata — Wapatum arrowhead
- Sagittaria graminea — grassleaf arrowhead
- Sagittaria latifolia — broadleaf arrowhead
- Sagittaria rigida — sessile-fruit arrowhead

== Amaranthaceae ==
- Amaranthus albus — white pigweed
- Amaranthus californicus — California amaranth
- Amaranthus powellii — green amaranth
- Amaranthus rudis — tall amaranth
- Amaranthus tuberculatus — roughfruit amaranth

== Amblystegiaceae ==
- Amblystegium serpens — amblystegium moss
- Amblystegium varium
- Calliergon cordifolium — calliergon moss
- Calliergon giganteum — giant calliergon moss
- Calliergon megalophyllum
- Calliergon obtusifolium
- Calliergon orbicularicordatum
- Calliergon richardsonii
- Calliergon stramineum
- Calliergon trifarium
- Calliergonella cuspidata
- Campylium cardotii
- Campylium chrysophyllum
- Campylium halleri
- Campylium hispidulum
- Campylium polygamum — campylium moss
- Campylium radicale
- Campylium stellatum — yellow starry fen moss
- Conardia compacta
- Cratoneuron filicinum
- Drepanocladus aduncus — drepanocladus moss
- Drepanocladus brevifolius
- Drepanocladus capillifolius
- Drepanocladus crassicostatus
- Drepanocladus sendtneri
- Hamatocaulis lapponicus
- Hamatocaulis vernicosus
- Hygroamblystegium fluviatile
- Hygroamblystegium noterophilum
- Hygroamblystegium tenax
- Hygrohypnum alpestre
- Hygrohypnum alpinum
- Hygrohypnum bestii
- Hygrohypnum cochlearifolium
- Hygrohypnum duriusculum
- Hygrohypnum eugyrium
- Hygrohypnum luridum
- Hygrohypnum micans
- Hygrohypnum molle
- Hygrohypnum montanum
- Hygrohypnum norvegicum
- Hygrohypnum ochraceum
- Hygrohypnum polare
- Hygrohypnum smithii
- Hygrohypnum styriacum
- Hygrohypnum subeugyrium
- Leptodictyum humile
- Leptodictyum riparium
- Limprichtia cossonii
- Limprichtia revolvens — limprichtia moss
- Loeskypnum badium
- Loeskypnum wickesiae
- Palustriella commutata
- Palustriella decipiens
- Platylomella lescurii
- Pseudocalliergon turgescens
- Sanionia uncinata
- Sarmenthypnum sarmentosum
- Scorpidium scorpioides
- Warnstorfia exannulata — warnstorfia moss
- Warnstorfia fluitans — warnstorfia moss
- Warnstorfia procera
- Warnstorfia pseudostraminea
- Warnstorfia trichophylla
- Warnstorfia tundrae

== Anacardiaceae ==
- Rhus aromatica — fragrant sumac
- Rhus copallinum — winged sumac
- Rhus glabra — smooth sumac
- Rhus trilobata — skunkbush
- Rhus typhina — staghorn sumac
- Rhus × pulvinata
- Toxicodendron diversilobum — western poison-oak
- Toxicodendron radicans — eastern poison-ivy
- Toxicodendron rydbergii — northern poison-oak
- Toxicodendron vernix — poison-sumac

== Andreaeaceae ==
- Andreaea alpestris
- Andreaea blyttii
- Andreaea crassinervia
- Andreaea heinemannii
- Andreaea megistospora
- Andreaea mutabilis
- Andreaea nivalis
- Andreaea obovata
- Andreaea rothii
- Andreaea rupestris
- Andreaea schofieldiana
- Andreaea sinuosa

== Andreaeobryaceae ==
- Andreaeobryum macrosporum

== Aneuraceae ==
- Aneura pinguis
- Riccardia chamedryfolia
- Riccardia latifrons
- Riccardia multifida — comb liverwort
- Riccardia palmata

== Annonaceae ==
- Asimina triloba — pawpaw

== Anomodontaceae ==
- Anomodon attenuatus
- Anomodon minor
- Anomodon rostratus
- Anomodon rugelii
- Anomodon viticulosus
- Haplohymenium triste
- Pterogonium gracile

== Antheliaceae ==
- Anthelia julacea
- Anthelia juratzkana

== Anthocerotaceae ==
- Anthoceros agrestis
- Anthoceros fusiformis
- Anthoceros macounii

== Apiaceae ==
- Angelica archangelica — Norwegian angelica
- Angelica arguta — Lyall's angelica
- Angelica atropurpurea — great angelica
- Angelica dawsonii — Dawson's angelica
- Angelica genuflexa — kneeling angelica
- Angelica laurentiana — St. Lawrence angelica
- Angelica lucida — seacoast angelica
- Angelica venenosa — hairy angelica
- Berula erecta — wild parsnip
- Bupleurum americanum — American thorowax
- Chaerophyllum procumbens — spreading chervil
- Chaerophyllum tainturieri — Tainturier's chervil
- Cicuta bulbifera — bulb-bearing water-hemlock
- Cicuta douglasii — western water-hemlock
- Cicuta maculata — spotted water-hemlock
- Cicuta virosa — MacKenzie's water-hemlock
- Cnidium cnidiifolium — Jakutsk snow parsley
- Conioselinum chinense — Chinese hemlock-parsley
- Conioselinum gmelinii — western hemlock-parsley
- Cryptotaenia canadensis — Canada honewort
- Cymopterus acaulis — plains wavewing
- Daucus pusillus — southwestern carrot
- Erigenia bulbosa — harbinger-of-spring
- Glehnia littoralis — American glehnia
- Heracleum maximum — cow-parsnip
- Hydrocotyle americana — American water-pennywort
- Hydrocotyle umbellata — many-flowered pennywort
- Hydrocotyle verticillata — whorled pennywort
- Ligusticum calderi — Calder's lovage
- Ligusticum canbyi — Canby's wild lovage
- Ligusticum scoticum — Scotch lovage
- Ligusticum verticillatum — Idaho lovage
- Lilaeopsis chinensis — eastern lilæopsis
- Lilaeopsis occidentalis — western lilæopsis
- Lomatium ambiguum — streambank desert-parsley
- Lomatium brandegeei — Brandegee's desert-parsley
- Lomatium cous — cousroot desert-parsley
- Lomatium dissectum — fernleaf desert-parsley
- Lomatium foeniculaceum — carrotleaf desert-parsley
- Lomatium geyeri — Geyer's desert-parsley
- Lomatium grayi — mountain desert-parsley
- Lomatium macrocarpum — largefruit desert-parsley
- Lomatium martindalei — coast range lomatium
- Lomatium nudicaule — nakedstem desert-parsley
- Lomatium orientale — Oriental desert-parsley
- Lomatium sandbergii — Sandberg's desert-parsley
- Lomatium simplex — umbrella desert-parsley
- Lomatium triternatum — ternate desert-parsley
- Lomatium utriculatum — foothill desert-parsley
- Musineon divaricatum — wild parsley
- Oenanthe sarmentosa — water-parsley
- Osmorhiza berteroi — Chilean sweet-cicely
- Osmorhiza claytonii — hairy sweet-cicely
- Osmorhiza depauperata — bluntfruit sweet-cicely
- Osmorhiza longistylis — smoother sweet-cicely
- Osmorhiza occidentalis — western sweet-cicely
- Osmorhiza purpurea — purple sweet-cicely
- Oxypolis occidentalis — western cowbane
- Oxypolis rigidior — stiff cowbane
- Perideridia gairdneri — Gairdner's yampah
- Podistera macounii — Macoun's podistera
- Podistera yukonensis — Yukon podistera
- Sanicula arctopoides — bear's-foot sanicle
- Sanicula bipinnatifida — purple black snakeroot
- Sanicula canadensis — short-styled sanicle
- Sanicula crassicaulis — Pacific black snakeroot
- Sanicula graveolens — sierra sanicle
- Sanicula marilandica — Maryland black snakeroot
- Sanicula odorata — clustered black snakeroot
- Sanicula trifoliata — large-fruited sanicle
- Sium suave — hemlock water-parsnip
- Taenidia integerrima — yellow pimpernel
- Thaspium barbinode — hairyjoint meadow-parsnip
- Thaspium trifoliatum — purple meadow-parsnip
- Yabea microcarpa — California hedge-parsley
- Zizia aptera — golden alexanders
- Zizia aurea — common alexanders

== Apocynaceae ==
- Apocynum androsaemifolium — spreading dogbane
- Apocynum cannabinum — clasping-leaf dogbane
- Apocynum × floribundum — hybrid dogbane

== Aquifoliaceae ==
- Ilex glabra — ink-berry
- Ilex verticillata — black holly
- Nemopanthus mucronatus — mountain holly

== Araceae ==
- Arisaema dracontium — green dragon
- Arisaema triphyllum — swamp Jack-in-the-pulpit
- Calla palustris — wild calla
- Lysichiton americanus — yellow skunk-cabbage
- Peltandra virginica — green arrow-arum
- Symplocarpus foetidus — skunk-cabbage

== Araliaceae ==
- Aralia hispida — bristly sarsaparilla
- Aralia nudicaulis — wild sarsaparilla
- Aralia racemosa — American spikenard
- Oplopanax horridus — Devil's-club
- Panax quinquefolius — American ginseng
- Panax trifolius — dwarf ginseng

== Archidiaceae ==
- Archidium ohioense

== Aristolochiaceae ==
- Asarum canadense — Canada wild-ginger
- Asarum caudatum — long-tailed wild-ginger

== Arnelliaceae ==
- Arnellia fennica

== Asclepiadaceae ==
- Asclepias exaltata — poke milkweed
- Asclepias hirtella — green milkweed
- Asclepias incarnata — swamp milkweed
- Asclepias lanuginosa — woolly milkweed
- Asclepias ovalifolia — dwarf milkweed
- Asclepias purpurascens — purple milkweed
- Asclepias quadrifolia — whorled milkweed
- Asclepias speciosa — showy milkweed
- Asclepias sullivantii — prairie milkweed
- Asclepias syriaca — Kansas milkweed
- Asclepias tuberosa — butterfly milkweed
- Asclepias verticillata — whorled milkweed
- Asclepias viridiflora — green milkweed

== Aspleniaceae ==
- Asplenium adulterinum — ladder spleenwort
- Asplenium platyneuron — ebony spleenwort
- Asplenium rhizophyllum — walking-fern spleenwort
- Asplenium ruta-muraria — wallrue spleenwort
- Asplenium scolopendrium — hart's-tongue fern
- Asplenium trichomanes — maidenhair spleenwort
- Asplenium viride — green spleenwort

== Asteraceae ==
- Achillea millefolium — common yarrow
- Achillea sibirica — Siberian yarrow
- Adenocaulon bicolor — American trail-plant
- Ageratina altissima — white snakeroot
- Agoseris aurantiaca — orange-flowered false-dandelion
- Agoseris gaspensis — Gaspé Peninsula agoseris
- Agoseris glauca — pale goat-chicory
- Agoseris grandiflora — largeflower false-dandelion
- Agoseris heterophylla — annual false-dandelion
- Agoseris lackschewitzii — pink agoseris
- Almutaster pauciflorus — marsh alkali aster
- Ambrosia acanthicarpa — flatspine bursage
- Ambrosia artemisiifolia — annual ragweed
- Ambrosia chamissonis — silver bursage
- Ambrosia coronopifolia — western ragweed
- Ambrosia psilostachya — nakedspike ambrosia
- Ambrosia trifida — great ragweed
- Ambrosia × helenae
- Anaphalis margaritacea — pearly everlasting
- Antennaria alpina — alpine pussytoes
- Antennaria anaphaloides — handsome pussytoes
- Antennaria aromatica — aromatic pussytoes
- Antennaria corymbosa — meadow pussytoes
- Antennaria densifolia — dense-leaved antennaria
- Antennaria dimorpha — two-form pussytoes
- Antennaria eucosma — Newfoundland pussytoes
- Antennaria flagellaris — stoloniferous pussytoes
- Antennaria friesiana — Fries' pussytoes
- Antennaria howellii — small pussytoes
- Antennaria lanata — white-margined pussytoes
- Antennaria luzuloides — silvery-brown pussytoes
- Antennaria media — Stony Mountain pussytoes
- Antennaria microphylla — small-leaf cat's-foot
- Antennaria monocephala — single-head pussytoes
- Antennaria neglecta — field pussytoes
- Antennaria parlinii — Parlin's pussytoes
- Antennaria parvifolia — Nuttall's pussytoes
- Antennaria plantaginifolia — plantainleaf pussytoes
- Antennaria pulcherrima — handsome pussytoes
- Antennaria racemosa — Hooker's pussytoes
- Antennaria rosea — rosy pussytoes
- Antennaria stenophylla — narrowleaf pussytoes
- Antennaria umbrinella — brown pussytoes
- Antennaria × erigeroides
- Antennaria × macounii
- Antennaria × rousseaui
- Arnica amplexicaulis — streambank arnica
- Arnica angustifolia — narrowleaf leopardbane
- Arnica chamissonis — leafy arnica
- Arnica cordifolia — heart-leaved arnica
- Arnica frigida — snow leopardbane
- Arnica fulgens — hillside arnica
- Arnica gracilis — slender leopardbane
- Arnica lanceolata
- Arnica latifolia — mountain arnica
- Arnica lessingii — Lessing's arnica
- Arnica lonchophylla — northern arnica
- Arnica longifolia — longleaf arnica
- Arnica louiseana — Lake Louise arnica
- Arnica mollis — hairy arnica
- Arnica parryi — nodding arnica
- Arnica rydbergii — subalpine arnica
- Arnica sororia — twin arnica
- Arnica × diversifolia — rayless arnica
- Arnoglossum plantagineum — Indian-plantain
- Artemisia alaskana — Alaska wormwood
- Artemisia arctica — boreal sagebrush
- Artemisia biennis — biennial wormwood
- Artemisia campestris — Pacific wormwood
- Artemisia cana — hoary sagebrush
- Artemisia dracunculus — dragon wormwood
- Artemisia frigida — prairie sagebrush
- Artemisia furcata — three-fork wormwood
- Artemisia globularia — arctic wormwood
- Artemisia glomerata — Pacific alpine wormwood
- Artemisia laciniata — Siberian wormwood
- Artemisia lindleyana — Columbia River wormwood
- Artemisia longifolia — longleaf wormwood
- Artemisia ludoviciana — white sagebrush
- Artemisia michauxiana — Michaux's wormwood
- Artemisia rupestris — rock wormwood
- Artemisia suksdorfii — coastal wormwood
- Artemisia tilesii — Tilesius' wormwood
- Artemisia tridentata — big sagebrush
- Artemisia tripartita — three-tip sagebrush
- Aster alpinus — alpine aster
- Baccharis halimifolia — eastern baccharis
- Balsamorhiza deltoidea — deltoid balsamroot
- Balsamorhiza sagittata — arrowleaf balsamroot
- Bidens amplissima — Vancouver Island beggarticks
- Bidens cernua — nodding beggarticks
- Bidens connata — purplestem beggarticks
- Bidens coronata — tickseed sunflower
- Bidens discoidea — swamp beggarticks
- Bidens eatonii — Eaton's beggarticks
- Bidens frondosa — Devil's beggarticks
- Bidens heterodoxa — Connecticut beggarticks
- Bidens hyperborea — estuary beggarticks
- Bidens tripartita — three-lobe beggarticks
- Bidens vulgata — tall bur-marigold
- Boltonia asteroides — aster-like boltonia
- Brickellia grandiflora — tassel flower
- Brickellia oblongifolia — narrowleaf brickell-bush
- Cacaliopsis nardosmia — silvercrown
- Canadanthus modestus — great northern aster
- Chaenactis douglasii — hoary pincushion
- Chrysothamnus viscidiflorus — sticky-leaf rabbitbrush
- Cirsium brevistylum — shortstyle thistle
- Cirsium canescens — prairie thistle
- Cirsium discolor — field thistle
- Cirsium drummondii — Drummond's thistle
- Cirsium edule — edible thistle
- Cirsium flodmanii — Flodman's thistle
- Cirsium foliosum — leafy thistle
- Cirsium hillii — Hill's thistle
- Cirsium hookerianum — Hooker's thistle
- Cirsium muticum — swamp thistle
- Cirsium pitcheri — dune thistle
- Cirsium scariosum
- Cirsium undulatum — nodding thistle
- Cirsium × vancouverense
- Conyza canadensis — Canada horseweed
- Coreopsis lanceolata — sand coreopsis
- Coreopsis rosea — rose coreopsis
- Coreopsis tinctoria — golden tickseed
- Coreopsis tripteris — tall tickseed
- Crepis atribarba — slender hawk's-beard
- Crepis elegans — elegant hawk's-beard
- Crepis intermedia — smallflower hawk's-beard
- Crepis modocensis — Siskiyou hawk's-beard
- Crepis nana — dwarf alpine hawk's-beard
- Crepis occidentalis — grey hawk's-beard
- Crepis runcinata — nakedstem hawk's-beard
- Crocidium multicaule — common spring-gold
- Dendranthema arcticum — arctic daisy
- Doellingeria umbellata — flat-top white aster
- Echinacea angustifolia — narrow-leaved purple coneflower
- Echinacea pallida — pale purple coneflower
- Eclipta prostrata — false daisy
- Erechtites hieraciifolia — fireweed
- Ericameria nauseosa — rubber rabbitbrush
- Erigeron acris — bitter fleabane
- Erigeron alpiniformis — alpine fleabane
- Erigeron annuus — whitetop fleabane
- Erigeron asper — rough fleabane
- Erigeron aureus — alpine yellow fleabane
- Erigeron borealis — boreal fleabane
- Erigeron caespitosus — cæspitose fleabane
- Erigeron compositus — dwarf mountain fleabane
- Erigeron corymbosus — longleaf fleabane
- Erigeron divergens — spreading fleabane
- Erigeron elatus — tall bitter fleabane
- Erigeron evermannii — Evermann's fleabane
- Erigeron filifolius — threadleaf fleabane
- Erigeron flagellaris — running fleabane
- Erigeron formosissimus — beautiful fleabane
- Erigeron glabellus — smooth fleabane
- Erigeron grandiflorus — largeflower fleabane
- Erigeron humilis — low fleabane
- Erigeron hyperboreus — hyperboreal fleabane
- Erigeron hyssopifolius — daisy fleabane
- Erigeron lackschewitzii — front range fleabane
- Erigeron lanatus — woolly fleabane
- Erigeron leibergii — Leiberg's fleabane
- Erigeron linearis — linearleaf fleabane
- Erigeron lonchophyllus — short-ray fleabane
- Erigeron mexiae — Mex' fleabane
- Erigeron ochroleucus — buff fleabane
- Erigeron pallens — pale fleabane
- Erigeron peregrinus — foreign fleabane
- Erigeron philadelphicus — Philadelphia fleabane
- Erigeron poliospermus — hairyseed fleabane
- Erigeron pulchellus — robin's-plantain
- Erigeron pumilus — shaggy fleabane
- Erigeron purpuratus — purple fleabane
- Erigeron radicatus — tap-rooted fleabane
- Erigeron salishii — Salish's daisy
- Erigeron scotteri — Scotter's fleabane
- Erigeron speciosus — Aspen fleabane
- Erigeron strigosus — daisy fleabane
- Erigeron subtrinervis — three-nerve fleabane
- Erigeron uniflorus — one-flower fleabane
- Erigeron × arthurii
- Erigeron yukonensis — Yukon fleabane
- Eriophyllum lanatum — common woolly-sunflower
- Eucephalus engelmannii — Engelmann's aster
- Eucephalus paucicapitatus — olympic aster
- Eupatorium altissimum — tall boneset
- Eupatorium dubium — joe-pye thoroughwort
- Eupatorium fistulosum — hollow joe-pyeweed
- Eupatorium maculatum — spotted joe-pyeweed
- Eupatorium perfoliatum — common boneset
- Eupatorium purpureum — sweet joe-pyeweed
- Eupatorium × truncatum
- Eurybia conspicua — showy aster
- Eurybia divaricata — white wood-aster
- Eurybia macrophylla — largeleaf wood-aster
- Eurybia merita — arctic aster
- Eurybia pygmaea — pygmy wood-aster
- Eurybia radula — rough wood-aster
- Eurybia radulina — roughleaf aster
- Eurybia schreberi — Schreiber's aster
- Eurybia sibirica — Siberian aster
- Euthamia caroliniana — slender fragrant goldenrod
- Euthamia galetorum — narrowleaf fragrant goldenrod
- Euthamia graminifolia — flat-top fragrant goldenrod
- Euthamia gymnospermoides — viscid bushy goldenrod
- Euthamia occidentalis — western fragrant goldenrod
- Gaillardia aristata — great blanket-flower
- Gaillardia pulchella — firewheel blanket-flower
- Gamochaeta ustulata — featherweed
- Gnaphalium obtusifolium — fragrant cudweed
- Gnaphalium palustre — western marsh cudweed
- Gnaphalium viscosum — winged cudweed
- Grindelia hirsutula — hairy gumweed
- Grindelia integrifolia — Puget Sound gumweed
- Grindelia nana — Idaho gumweed
- Grindelia nuda — curly-top gumweed
- Grindelia squarrosa — broadleaf gumweed
- Grindelia stricta — Oregon gumweed
- Gutierrezia sarothrae — broom snakeweed
- Helenium autumnale — common sneezeweed
- Helianthella uniflora — Rocky Mountain rockrose
- Helianthus annuus — common sunflower
- Helianthus couplandii — Coupland's sunflower
- Helianthus decapetalus — thin-leaved sunflower
- Helianthus divaricatus — woodland sunflower
- Helianthus giganteus — tall sunflower
- Helianthus maximiliani — Maximillian's sunflower
- Helianthus nuttallii — Nuttall's sunflower
- Helianthus pauciflorus — stiff sunflower
- Helianthus petiolaris — prairie sunflower
- Helianthus strumosus — paleleaf sunflower
- Helianthus tuberosus — Jerusalem artichoke
- Helianthus × alexidis
- Helianthus × laetiflorus — hybrid prairie sunflower
- Helianthus × luxurians
- Heliopsis helianthoides — smooth oxeye
- Heterotheca villosa — hairy false goldenaster
- Hieracium albiflorum — whiteflower hawkweed
- Hieracium canadense — Canada hawkweed
- Hieracium cynoglossoides — hound's-tongue hawkweed
- Hieracium gracile — alpine hawkweed
- Hieracium groenlandicum — Greenland hawkweed
- Hieracium gronovii — hairy hawkweed
- Hieracium kalmii — Kalm's hawkweed
- Hieracium laevigatum — smooth hawkweed
- Hieracium marianum — Maryland hawkweed
- Hieracium paniculatum — panicled hawkweed
- Hieracium plicatum — boreal hawkweed
- Hieracium robinsonii — Robinson's hawkweed
- Hieracium scabrum — rough hawkweed
- Hieracium scouleri — Scouler's hawkweed
- Hieracium triste — woolly hawkweed
- Hieracium umbellatum — umbellate hawkweed
- Hieracium venosum — rattlesnake hawkweed
- Hieracium × dutillyanum
- Hieracium × fassettii
- Hieracium × fernaldii
- Hieracium × flagellare
- Hieracium × grohii
- Hieracium × stoloniflorum
- Hymenopappus filifolius — fineleaf woolly-white
- Hymenoxys richardsonii — Richardson's bitterweed
- Ionactis linariifolius — flaxleaf aster
- Ionactis stenomeres — Rocky Mountain aster
- Iva axillaris — small-flowered marsh-elder
- Iva frutescens — bigleaf marsh-elder
- Jaumea carnosa — fleshy jaumea
- Krigia biflora — two-flower dwarf-dandelion
- Krigia virginica — Virginia dwarf-dandelion
- Lactuca biennis — tall blue lettuce
- Lactuca canadensis — Canada lettuce
- Lactuca floridana — woodland lettuce
- Lactuca hirsuta — hairy lettuce
- Lactuca ludoviciana — western lettuce
- Lactuca tatarica — Tartarian lettuce
- Lactuca terrae-novae — Newfoundland lettuce
- Lasthenia maritima — maritime goldfields
- Leucanthemum integrifolium — entire-leaf daisy
- Liatris aspera — tall gayfeather
- Liatris cylindracea — slender blazingstar
- Liatris ligulistylis — strapstyle gayfeather
- Liatris punctata — dotted gayfeather
- Liatris spheroidea — spherical gayfeather
- Liatris spicata — marsh blazingstar
- Liatris × creditonensis
- Liatris × gladewitzii
- Luina hypoleuca — littleleaf silverback
- Lygodesmia juncea — rush skeletonplant
- Machaeranthera canescens — hoary tansy-aster
- Machaeranthera grindelioides — western aster
- Machaeranthera pinnatifida — spiny goldenaster
- Madia exigua — little tarweed
- Madia glomerata — mountain tarweed
- Madia gracilis — grassy tarweed
- Madia madioides — woodland tarweed
- Madia minima — smallhead tarweed
- Matricaria discoidea — pineapple-weed chamomile
- Megalodonta beckii — Beck's water-marigold
- Microseris bigelovii — coast microseris
- Microseris borealis — northern microseris
- Microseris lindleyi — Lindley's silverpuffs
- Microseris nutans — nodding silverpuffs
- Mikania scandens — climbing hempweed
- Nothocalais cuspidata — prairie false-dandelion
- Nothocalais troximoides — weevil false-dandelion
- Oclemena acuminata — whorled aster
- Oclemena nemoralis — bog aster
- Oclemena × blakei — Blake's aster
- Oligoneuron album — prairie goldenrod
- Oligoneuron houghtonii — Houghton's goldenrod
- Oligoneuron ohioense — Ohio goldenrod
- Oligoneuron riddellii — Riddell's goldenrod
- Oligoneuron rigidum — stiff goldenrod
- Oligoneuron × bernardii
- Oligoneuron × krotkovii
- Oligoneuron × lutescens — upland aster
- Oligoneuron × maheuxii
- Omalotheca norvegica — Norwegian cudweed
- Omalotheca supina — alpine cudweed
- Omalotheca sylvatica — woodland cudweed
- Packera aurea — golden ragwort
- Packera cana — silvery ragwort
- Packera contermina — northwestern groundsel
- Packera cymbalaria — dwarf arctic groundsel
- Packera hyperborealis — boreal groundsel
- Packera indecora — plains ragwort
- Packera macounii — Siskiyou Mountains butterweed
- Packera moresbiensis — Queen Charlotte groundsel
- Packera obovata — roundleaf groundsel
- Packera ogotorukensis — Ogotoruk Creek groundsel
- Packera pauciflora — few-flower ragwort
- Packera paupercula — balsam ragwort
- Packera plattensis — prairie ragwort
- Packera pseudaurea — western golden groundsel
- Packera schweinitziana — Robbin's squawweed
- Packera streptanthifolia — cleftleaf ragwort
- Packera tridenticulata — three-tooth groundsel
- Petasites frigidus — arctic butterbur
- Petasites sagittatus — arrowleaf sweet colt's-foot
- Petasites × vitifolius
- Picradeniopsis oppositifolia — oppositeleaf false bahia
- Polymnia canadensis — whiteflower leafcup
- Prenanthes alata — western rattlesnake-root
- Prenanthes alba — white rattlesnake-root
- Prenanthes altissima — tall rattlesnake-root
- Prenanthes nana — dwarf rattlesnake-root
- Prenanthes racemosa — glaucous rattlesnake-root
- Prenanthes sagittata — arrowleaf rattlesnake-root
- Prenanthes trifoliolata — three-leaved rattlesnake-root
- Prenanthes × mainensis
- Pseudognaphalium canescens — Wright's cudweed
- Psilocarphus brevissimus — round woolly-heads
- Psilocarphus elatior — tall woolly-heads
- Psilocarphus tenellus — slender woolly-heads
- Pyrrocoma carthamoides — largeflower goldenweed
- Pyrrocoma lanceolata — lance-leaved goldenweed
- Pyrrocoma uniflora — plantain goldenweed
- Ratibida columnifera — upright prairie coneflower
- Ratibida pinnata — greyhead prairie coneflower
- Rudbeckia fulgida — orange coneflower
- Rudbeckia hirta — black-eyed susan
- Rudbeckia laciniata — cut-leaved coneflower
- Saussurea americana — American saw-wort
- Saussurea angustifolia — narrowleaf saw-wort
- Saussurea densa — clustered saw-wort
- Saussurea viscida — sticky saw-wort
- Senecio congestus — marsh ragwort
- Senecio cymbalarioides — cleftleaf groundsel
- Senecio elmeri — Elmer's ragwort
- Senecio eremophilus — desert groundsel
- Senecio fremontii — Fremont's ragwort
- Senecio hydrophiloides — sweet marsh ragwort
- Senecio hydrophilus — great swamp ragwort
- Senecio integerrimus — entire-leaf ragwort
- Senecio lugens — blacktip groundsel
- Senecio megacephalus — Nuttall's ragwort
- Senecio pseudoarnica — seabeach groundsel
- Senecio sheldonensis — Mount Sheldon groundsel
- Senecio triangularis — arrowleaf groundsel
- Sericocarpus rigidus — Curtus' aster
- Shinnersoseris rostrata — annual skeletonweed
- Silphium laciniatum — compass plant
- Silphium perfoliatum — cup-plant
- Silphium terebinthinaceum — prairie rosinweed
- Sinosenecio newcombei — Newcombe's groundsel
- Solidago altissima — tall goldenrod
- Solidago arguta — cutleaf goldenrod
- Solidago bicolor — white goldenrod
- Solidago caesia — bluestem goldenrod
- Solidago calcicola — rock goldenrod
- Solidago canadensis — Canada goldenrod
- Solidago cutleri — Cutler's goldenrod
- Solidago flexicaulis — broad-leaved goldenrod
- Solidago gigantea — smooth goldenrod
- Solidago hispida — hairy goldenrod
- Solidago juncea — early goldenrod
- Solidago latissimifolia — Elliott's goldenrod
- Solidago macrophylla — largeleaf goldenrod
- Solidago missouriensis — Missouri goldenrod
- Solidago mollis — ground goldenrod
- Solidago multiradiata — alpine goldenrod
- Solidago nemoralis — field goldenrod
- Solidago patula — roundleaf goldenrod
- Solidago puberula — downy goldenrod
- Solidago rugosa — roughleaf goldenrod
- Solidago sempervirens — seaside goldenrod
- Solidago simplex — sticky goldenrod
- Solidago speciosa — showy goldenrod
- Solidago squarrosa — squarrose goldenrod
- Solidago uliginosa — bog goldenrod
- Solidago ulmifolia — elmleaf goldenrod
- Solidago victorinii — Victorin's goldenrod
- Solidago × asperula
- Solidago × beaudryi
- Solidago × erskinei
- Solidago × luteus
- Solidago × raymondii
- Stenotus acaulis — stemless mock goldenweed
- Stenotus armerioides — thrift mock goldenweed
- Stenotus macleanii — MacLean's goldenweed
- Stephanomeria minor — narrowleaf skeletonplant
- Stephanomeria runcinata — desert skeletonplant
- Stephanomeria spinosa — thorny wire-lettuce
- Symphyotrichum anticostense — Anticosti aster
- Symphyotrichum ascendens — western aster
- Symphyotrichum boreale — boreal aster
- Symphyotrichum campestre — western meadow-aster
- Symphyotrichum ciliatum — alkali American-aster
- Symphyotrichum ciliolatum — Lindley's aster
- Symphyotrichum cordifolium — heartleaf aster
- Symphyotrichum dumosum — bushy aster
- Symphyotrichum eatonii — Eaton's aster
- Symphyotrichum ericoides — white heath aster
- Symphyotrichum falcatum — white prairie aster
- Symphyotrichum foliaceum — leafy-bracted aster
- Symphyotrichum frondosum — alkali aster
- Symphyotrichum hendersonii — Henderson's American-aster
- Symphyotrichum laeve — smooth blue aster
- Symphyotrichum lanceolatum — panicled aster
- Symphyotrichum lateriflorum — starved aster
- Symphyotrichum laurentianum — St. Lawrence aster
- Symphyotrichum novae-angliae — New England aster
- Symphyotrichum novi-belgii — longleaf aster
- Symphyotrichum ontarionis — Ontario aster
- Symphyotrichum oolentangiense — sky blue aster
- Symphyotrichum pilosum — white heath aster
- Symphyotrichum praealtum — willow aster
- Symphyotrichum prenanthoides — crooked-stem aster
- Symphyotrichum puniceum — swamp aster
- Symphyotrichum racemosum — small white aster
- Symphyotrichum robynsianum — Robyns' American-aster
- Symphyotrichum sericeum — western silvery aster
- Symphyotrichum shortii — Short's aster
- Symphyotrichum spathulatum — western mountain aster
- Symphyotrichum subspicatum — Douglas' aster
- Symphyotrichum subulatum — annual saltmarsh aster
- Symphyotrichum tradescantii — Tradescant's aster
- Symphyotrichum undulatum — wavyleaf aster
- Symphyotrichum urophyllum — white-arrow aster
- Symphyotrichum × amethystinum
- Symphyotrichum yukonense — Yukon aster
- Tanacetum bipinnatum — Lake Huron tansy
- Taraxacum carneocoloratum — pink dandelion
- Taraxacum eriophorum — wool-bearing dandelion
- Taraxacum lyratum — alpine dandelion
- Taraxacum officinale — common dandelion
- Taraxacum phymatocarpum — northern dandelion
- Tephroseris atropurpurea — dark purple groundsel
- Tephroseris kjellmanii — Kjellman's squawweed
- Tephroseris lindstroemii — twice-hairy groundsel
- Tephroseris yukonensis — Yukon groundsel
- Tetradymia canescens — grey horsebrush
- Tetraneuris acaulis — stemless four-nerve daisy
- Tetraneuris herbacea — lakeside daisy
- Thelesperma subnudum — border goldthread
- Tonestus lyallii — Lyall's haplopappus
- Townsendia condensata — cushion townsend-daisy
- Townsendia exscapa — silky townsend-daisy
- Townsendia hookeri — Hooker's townsend-daisy
- Townsendia parryi — Parry's townsend-daisy
- Tripleurospermum maritima — false chamomile
- Verbesina alternifolia — wingstem
- Vernonia fasciculata — fascicled ironweed
- Vernonia gigantea — giant ironweed
- Vernonia missurica — Missouri ironweed
- Xanthium strumarium — rough cocklebur

== Aulacomniaceae ==
- Aulacomnium acuminatum — acutetip aulacomnium moss
- Aulacomnium androgynum
- Aulacomnium heterostichum
- Aulacomnium palustre — aulacomnium moss
- Aulacomnium turgidum

== Aytoniaceae ==
- Asterella gracilis
- Asterella lindenbergiana
- Asterella saccata
- Asterella tenella
- Mannia fragrans
- Mannia pilosa
- Mannia sibirica
- Mannia triandra
- Reboulia hemisphaerica

== Azollaceae ==
- Azolla caroliniana — eastern mosquito-fern
- Azolla mexicana — Mexican mosquito-fern
