= Crocidium =

Crocidium is the name of two genera of life-forms:

- Crocidium (fly), a genus in the bee-flies family Bombyliidae
- Crocidium (plant), a genus in the daisies and sunflowers family Asteraceae
