= Schinia sexata =

Scientific classification
- Domain: Eukaryota
- Kingdom: Animalia
- Phylum: Arthropoda
- Class: Insecta
- Order: Lepidoptera
- Superfamily: Noctuoidea
- Family: Noctuidae
- Genus: Schinia
- Species: S. sexata

Binomial name
- Schinia sexata Smith, 1906

Species of moth

Schinia sexata is a moth of the family Noctuidae. It is found in North America, where it is known only from southern Manitoba, Canada.

It was formerly considered a subspecies of Schinia villosa.

The larvae feed exclusively on Erigeron glabellus.
