= Castilleja kerryana =

Conservation status
- Vulnerable (NatureServe)

Scientific classification
- Kingdom: Plantae
- Clade: Embryophytes
- Clade: Tracheophytes
- Clade: Spermatophytes
- Clade: Angiosperms
- Clade: Eudicots
- Clade: Asterids
- Order: Lamiales
- Family: Orobanchaceae
- Genus: Castilleja
- Species: C. kerryana

Binomial name
- Castilleja kerryana J.M.Egger

Species of flowering plant

Castilleja kerryana is a species of flowering plant in the family Orobanchaceae. It is commonly known as Kerry's Indian paintbrush or Kerry's paintbrush. It was formally described in 2013 and so far it is known only from a small population in the state of Montana, in the Northwestern United States.

The first collection of this plant was tentatively identified as a specimen of Castilleja crista-galli, and it is also similar to C. fraterna and C. pulchella. It differs from the latter two in its color and in the shape of its stem and flower corolla.

== Description ==
Castilleja kerryana is a perennial herb growing from a woody caudex and yellowish root system. It may have several flowering stems as well as several shorter vegetative stems. They may be decumbent at the bases and grow upright toward the tips. They are greenish, reddish, or purplish, hairy in texture, and up to 18 centimeters long. The leaves are linear to lance-shaped, often cleft into lobes, green or purple-tinged in color, and up to 7 centimeters long.

The inflorescence is a dense spike up to 7 centimeters long and spreading up to 8 wide. The calyx and bracts of the flowers are colored "red, scarlet, crimson, red-orange, coral, salmon, salmon-pink, red-magenta, and violet-magenta, to very occasionally yellowish." The lobed, pointed bracts are up to 3 centimeters long, and the flowers may extend past them. The sepals are brightly pigmented. The flower corolla is up to 5 centimeters long, tubular, beaked, and pouched. The stigma protrudes. The fruit is a capsule nearly a centimeter long.

== Distribution and habitat ==
This plant is known only from the Scapegoat Wilderness, in the Flathead Range of the Rocky Mountains in northern Montana. It has been found only in Cambrian limestone substrates. It grows in thin, rocky soils in krummholz and fellfield habitat. It also grows in moist to dry, gravelly slopes and ridges, scree, and talus. It occurs at 8,000 to 9,000 feet elevation. Its habitat is threatened by climate change, grazing, recreation, and invasive species.

== Ecology ==
Castilleja kerryana often grows alongside Dryas octopetala, and it is suspected that it is hemiparasitic on it, as many Castilleja tap the roots of various other species.

Other plants occurring in the habitat include Carex rupestris, Carex scirpoidea, Kobresia myosuroides, Abies lasiocarpa, Salix vestita, Arenaria rossii, Silene acaulis, Aquilegia jonesii, Caltha leptosepala, Cardamine rupicola, Draba lonchocarpa, Physaria didymocarpa, Smelowskia calycina, Saxifraga oppositifolia, Polygonum viviparum, Potentilla glaucophylla, Hedysarum sulphurescens, Oxytropis sericea, Androsace lehmaniana, Phlox pulvinata, Eritrichium nanum, Besseya wyomingensis, Pedicularis bracteosa, Pedicularis contorta, Pedicularis groenlandica, Antennaria alpina, Antennaria aromatica, Oreostemma alpigenum, Erigeron lackschewitzii, and Senecio canus.

This plant is named for the daughter and sister of the author, both named Kerry.
