= Water ragwort =

Water ragwort is a common name for several plants and may refer to:

- Jacobaea aquatica
- Senecio hydrophilus, native to western North America
