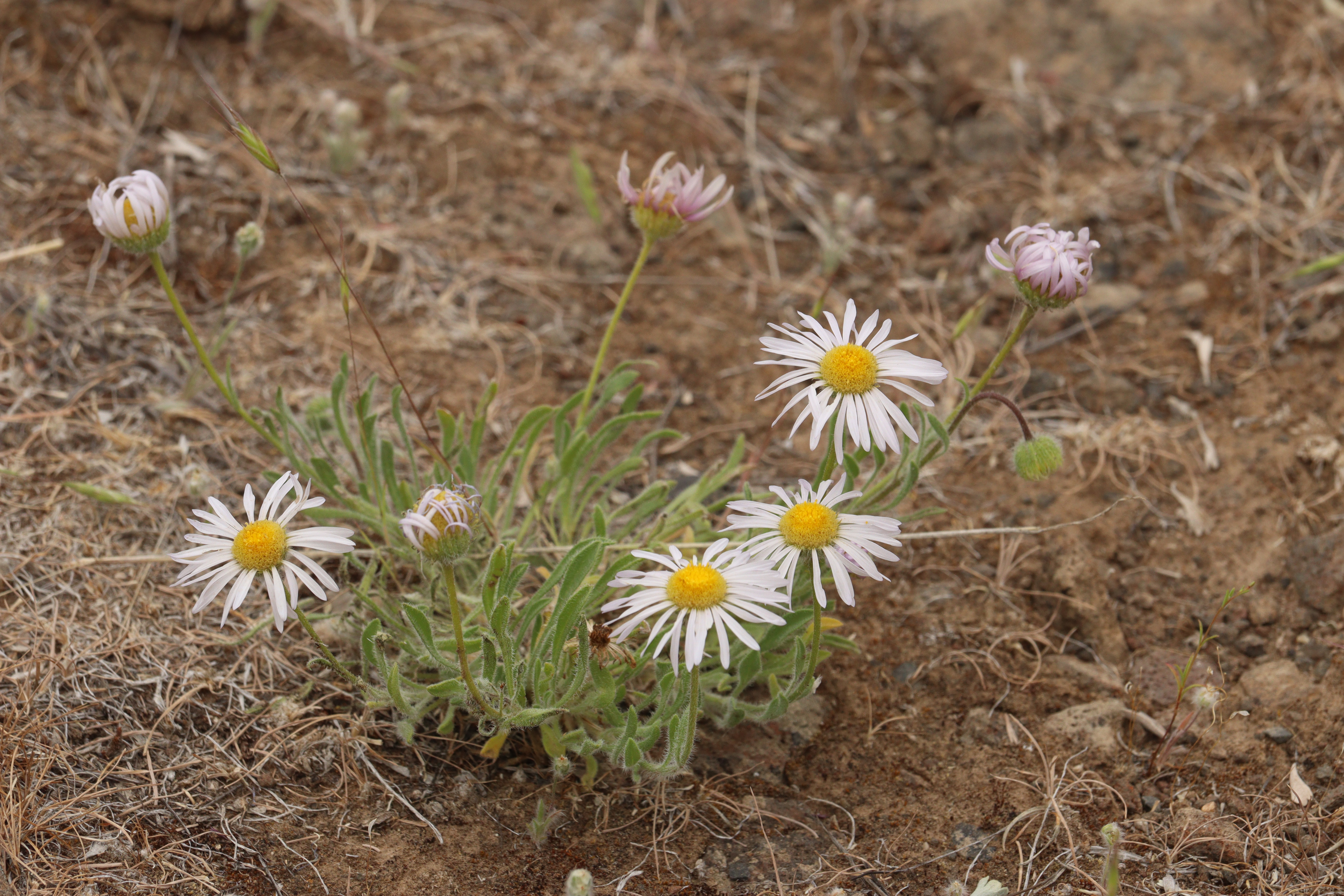

Scientific classification
- Kingdom: Plantae
- Clade: Tracheophytes
- Clade: Angiosperms
- Clade: Eudicots
- Clade: Asterids
- Order: Asterales
- Family: Asteraceae
- Genus: Erigeron
- Species: E. poliospermus

Binomial name
- Erigeron poliospermus A.Gray

= Erigeron poliospermus =

Species of flowering plant

Erigeron poliospermus is a species of flowering plant in the family Asteraceae known by the common names gray-seeded fleabane, purple cushion fleabane, and hairy-seed fleabane. Native to western North America, it is mainly found to the east of the Cascade Range in Washington, Oregon, and Idaho.

== Description ==
Erigeron poliospermus is a small perennial herb rarely more than 15 centimetres (5 7/8 in) tall, producing a woody taproot. Leaves arise basally and are linear-oblanceolate to spatulate, up to 8 cm long and 12 mm wide, and are covered with long protruding hairs. The plant usually produces single (rarely up to 3) flower heads per stem, which arises basally and is hairy and is leafless or may bear a few very reduced leaves. Each head has 15–45 pink, purple, or white ray florets surrounding numerous yellow disc florets. The ray florets are lacking in var. disciformis. The involucre bracts, 5–9 mm (1/4–3/8 in) long, are more or less the same length and are sparsely to densely white-hairy. Seeds are borne on achenes densely covered with long silky hairs and are presumably wind dispersed.

The somewhat similar Erigeron pumilus is usually taller and shaggier in general appearance and has much more prominent leaf-like bracts scattered up a branched flower stem and usually multiple flowers per stem and narrower basal leaves.

== Habitat ==
Erigeron poliospermus grows in desert, scrub and rocky habitats below 1,800 metres (6,000 ft), and is occasionally found at higher elevations. It is common on the Columbia Plateau in thin rocky soils above basalt bedrock.

Varieties

- Erigeron poliospermus var. cereus Cronquist - Washington
- Erigeron poliospermus var. disciformis (Cronquist) G.L.Nesom - Washington, Oregon
- Erigeron poliospermus var. poliospermus - British Columbia, Washington, Idaho, Oregon

== Gallery ==
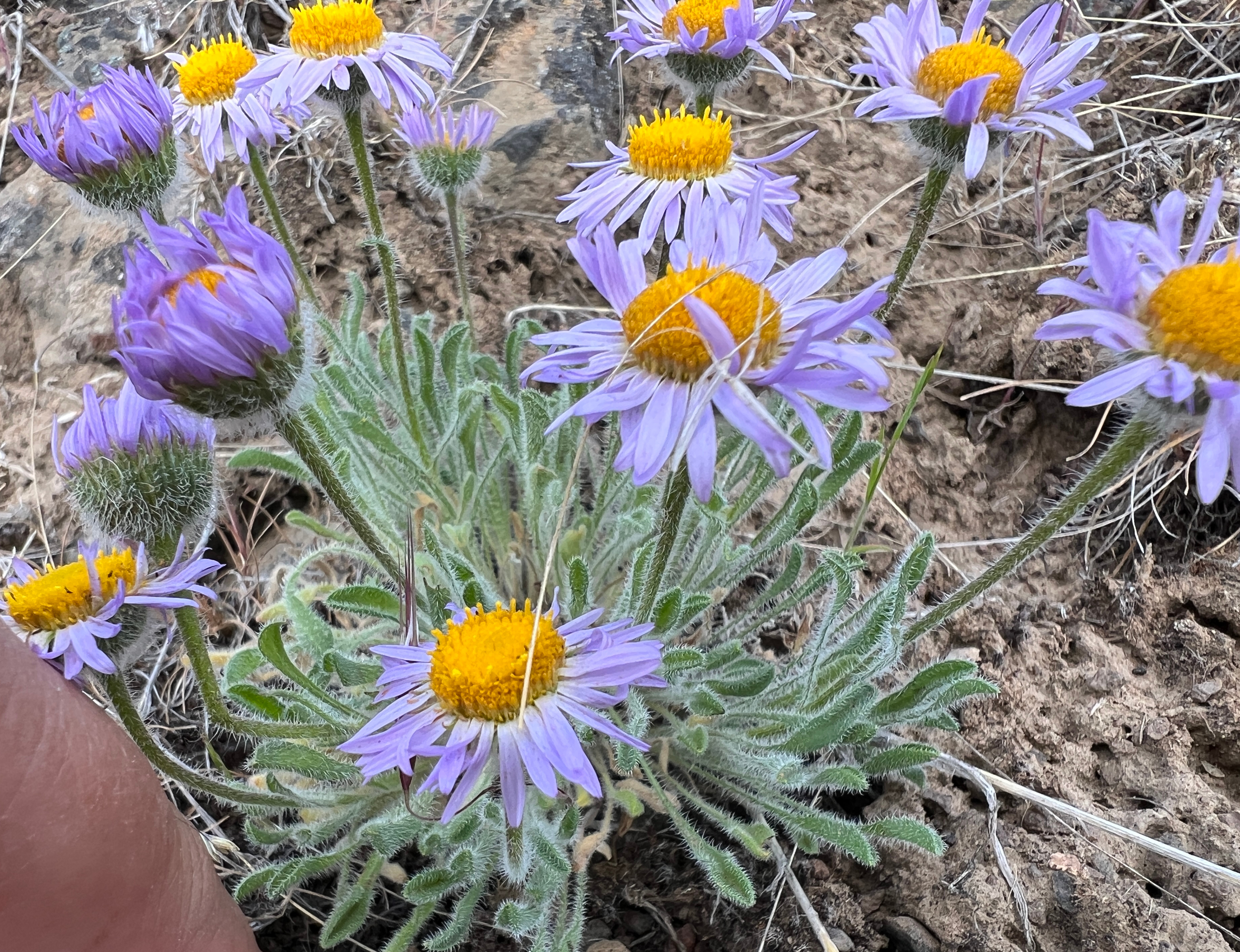
Leaf and involucre morphology
