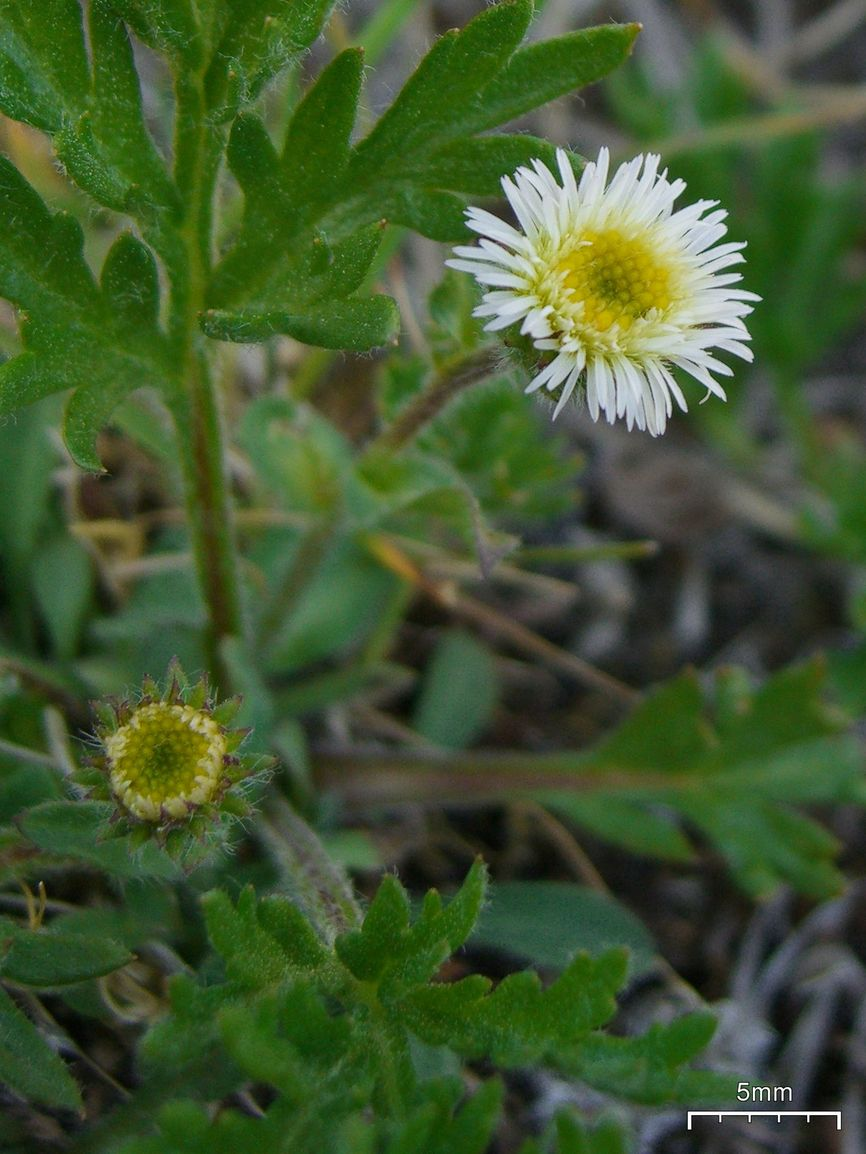

Scientific classification
- Kingdom: Plantae
- Clade: Tracheophytes
- Clade: Angiosperms
- Clade: Eudicots
- Clade: Asterids
- Order: Asterales
- Family: Asteraceae
- Genus: Erigeron
- Species: E. pallens

Binomial name
- Erigeron pallens Cronquist

Synonyms
- Erigeron purpuratus subsp. pallens (Cronquist) G.W. Douglas

= Erigeron pallens =

Species of flowering plant

Erigeron pallens is a species of flowering plant in the family Asteraceae known by the common name pale fleabane. It is native to the Rocky Mountains of western Canada (Alberta + British Columbia). There are some reports of the species in arctic regions but these populations have been reclassified under other species.

Erigeron pallens is a tiny, unbranching perennial herb rarely more than 10 centimeters (4 inches) tall, producing a woody taproot. The leaves are covered with wool. The plant generally produces only 1 flower head per stem, each head with 50–60 white, pink, or purple ray florets surrounding numerous yellow disc florets. The plant grows on rocky slopes in sparsely vegetated slopes.
