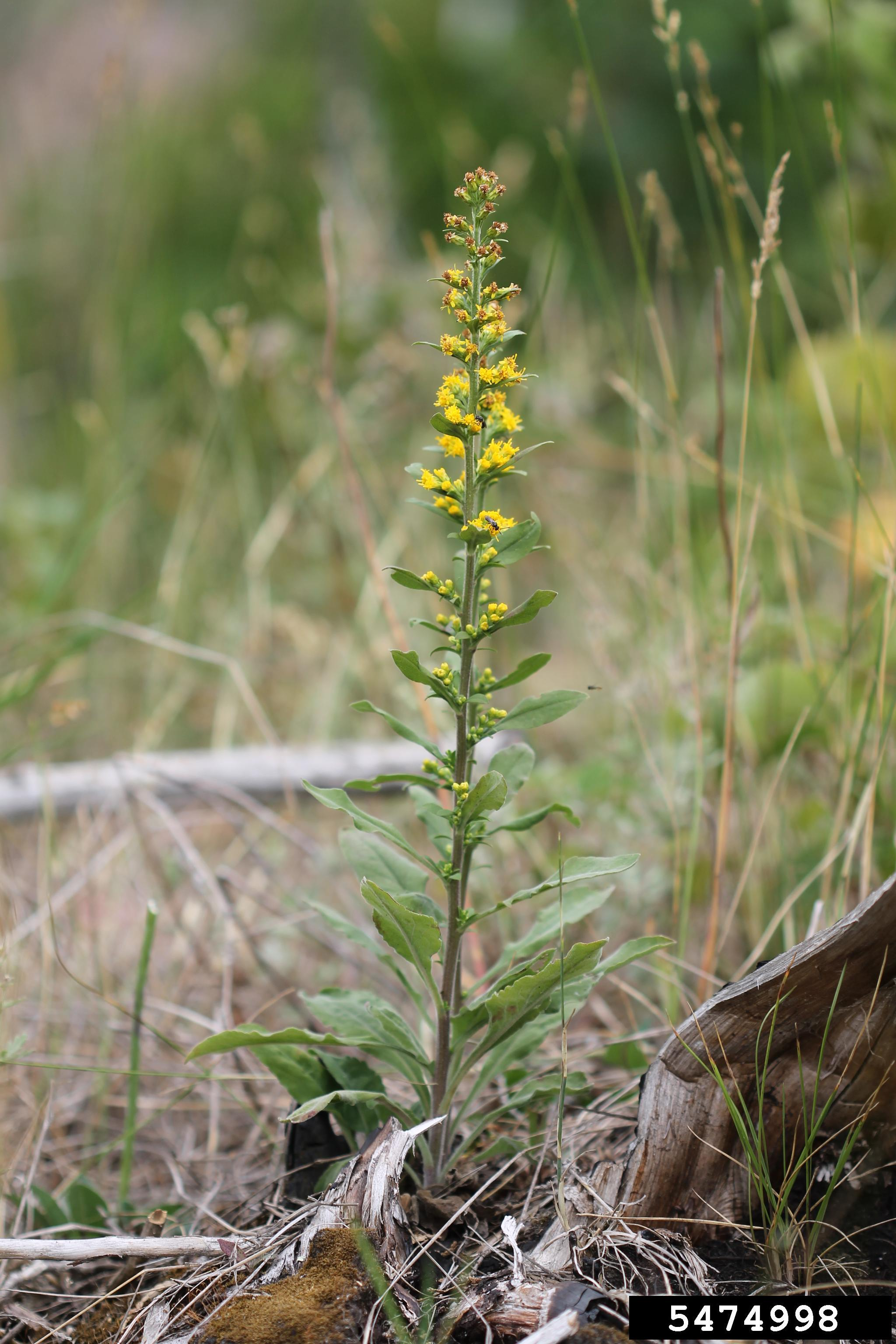

Scientific classification
- Kingdom: Plantae
- Clade: Tracheophytes
- Clade: Angiosperms
- Clade: Eudicots
- Clade: Asterids
- Order: Asterales
- Family: Asteraceae
- Genus: Solidago
- Species: S. hispida

Binomial name
- Solidago hispida Muhl. ex Willd.

Synonyms
- Solidago earlei Small; Solidago hirsuta Nutt.; Solidago lanata Hook.

= Solidago hispida =

Species of plant

Solidago hispida, the hairy goldenrod, is North American species of flowering plants in the family Asteraceae. Its native range extends from Newfoundland west to Saskatchewan, and south as far as Oklahoma, Louisiana, and Georgia.

Solidago hispida is a perennial herb up to 100 cm (39 in) tall, with a branching underground caudex. Leaves are egg-shaped (ovate) or elliptical, up to 20 cm (8 in) long. One plant can produce more than 250 small yellow flower heads in branching arrays at the tops of the stems.
