= Erigeron elatus =

Scientific classification
- Kingdom: Plantae
- Clade: Tracheophytes
- Clade: Angiosperms
- Clade: Eudicots
- Clade: Asterids
- Order: Asterales
- Family: Asteraceae
- Genus: Erigeron
- Species: E. elatus

Binomial name
- Erigeron elatus (Hook.) Greene

Synonyms
- Erigeron acris var. arcuans Fernald; Erigeron acris var. elatus (Hook.) Cronquist; Erigeron alpinus var. elatus Hook.; Erigeron elatus var. oligocephalus (Fernald & Wiegand) Fernald; Trimorpha elata (Hook.) G.L.Nesom

Species of flowering plant

Erigeron elatus is a North American species of flowering plants in the family Asteraceae known by the common names swamp fleabane and swamp boreal-daisy.

Erigeron elatus is widespread across most of Canada, found in every province and territory except the 3 Maritime Provinces. It has also been found in the states of Washington and Alaska in the United States. It grows in tundra, bogs, floodplains, and the edges of ponds.

Erigeron elatus is a biennial or perennial herb up to 50 centimeters (20 inches) in height. It produces 1-8 flower heads per stem, each head as many as 120 pink or white ray florets surrounding numerous yellow disc florets.
