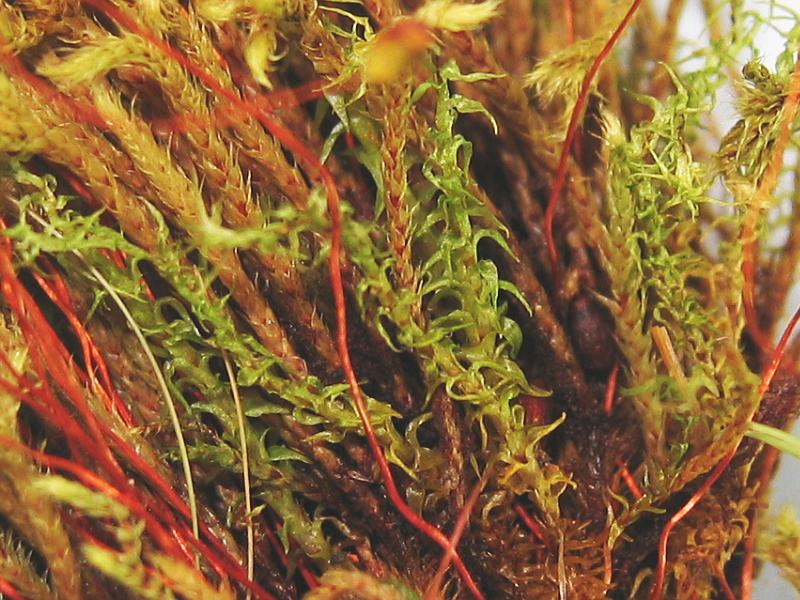

Scientific classification
- Kingdom: Plantae
- Division: Bryophyta
- Class: Bryopsida
- Subclass: Bryidae
- Order: Hypnales
- Family: Amblystegiaceae
- Genus: Campylium
- Species: C. polygamum

Binomial name
- Campylium polygamum (Schimp.) C.E.O.Jensen

= Campylium polygamum =

Species of moss

Campylium polygamum is a species of moss belonging to the family Amblystegiaceae.

It has cosmopolitan distribution.
