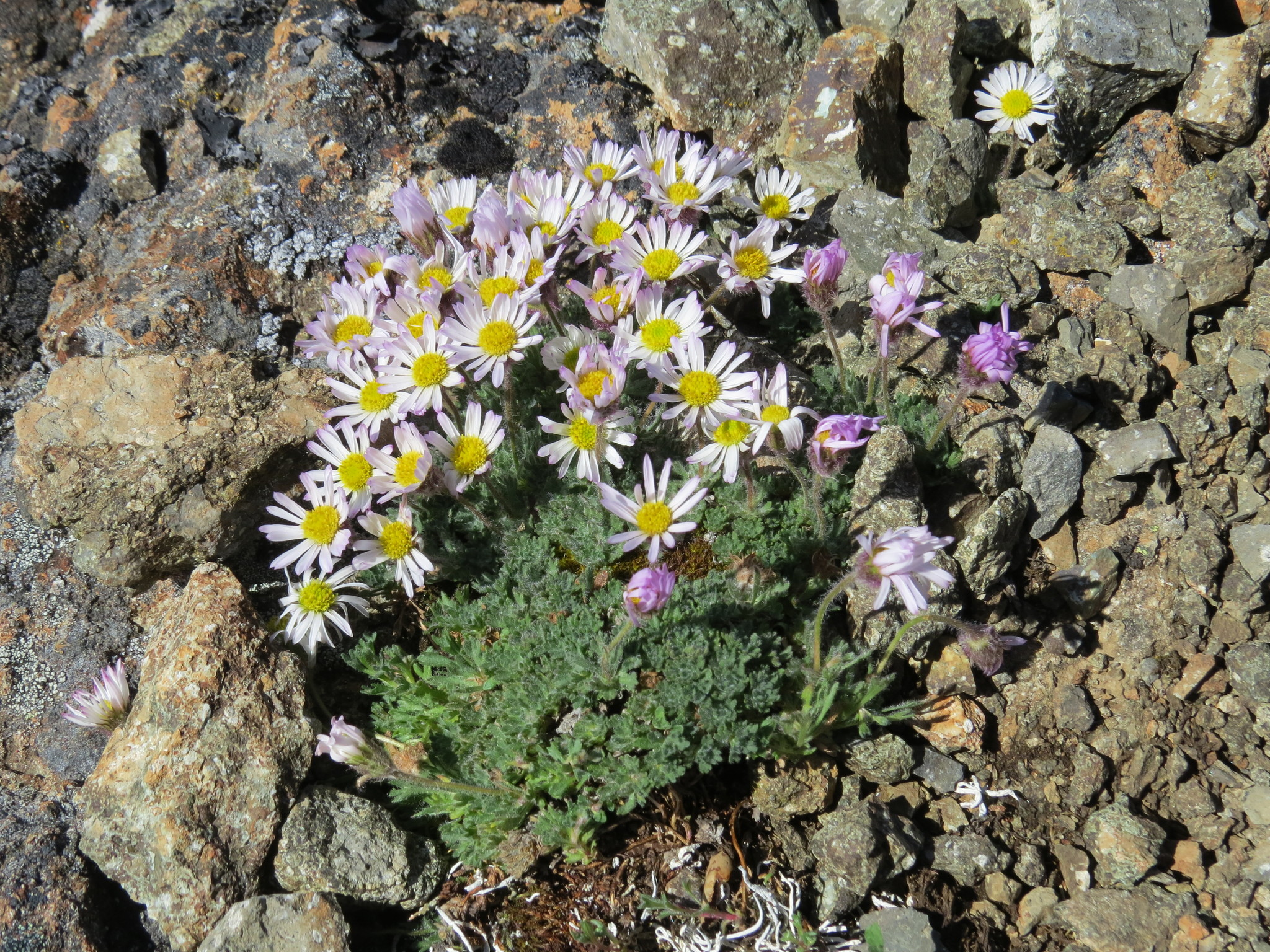
- In Strathcona Provincial Park, British Columbia

Scientific classification
- Kingdom: Plantae
- Clade: Tracheophytes
- Clade: Angiosperms
- Clade: Eudicots
- Clade: Asterids
- Order: Asterales
- Family: Asteraceae
- Genus: Erigeron
- Species: E. salishii

Binomial name
- Erigeron salishii G.W.Douglas & Packer

= Erigeron salishii =

Species of flowering plant

Erigeron salishii is a North American species of flowering plant in the family Asteraceae known by the common names Salish fleabane and Star Peak fleabane. It grows in the Coast Ranges of British Columbia and Washington state.

Erigeron salishii grows on cliffs, ledges, and gravelly slopes. It is a tiny perennial rarely more than 7 centimeters (2.8 inches) tall, with many stems crowded together into a compact clump. The inflorescence generally contains only 1 flower head per stem. Each head contains 15–32 blue, or white ray florets surrounding many yellow disc florets.
