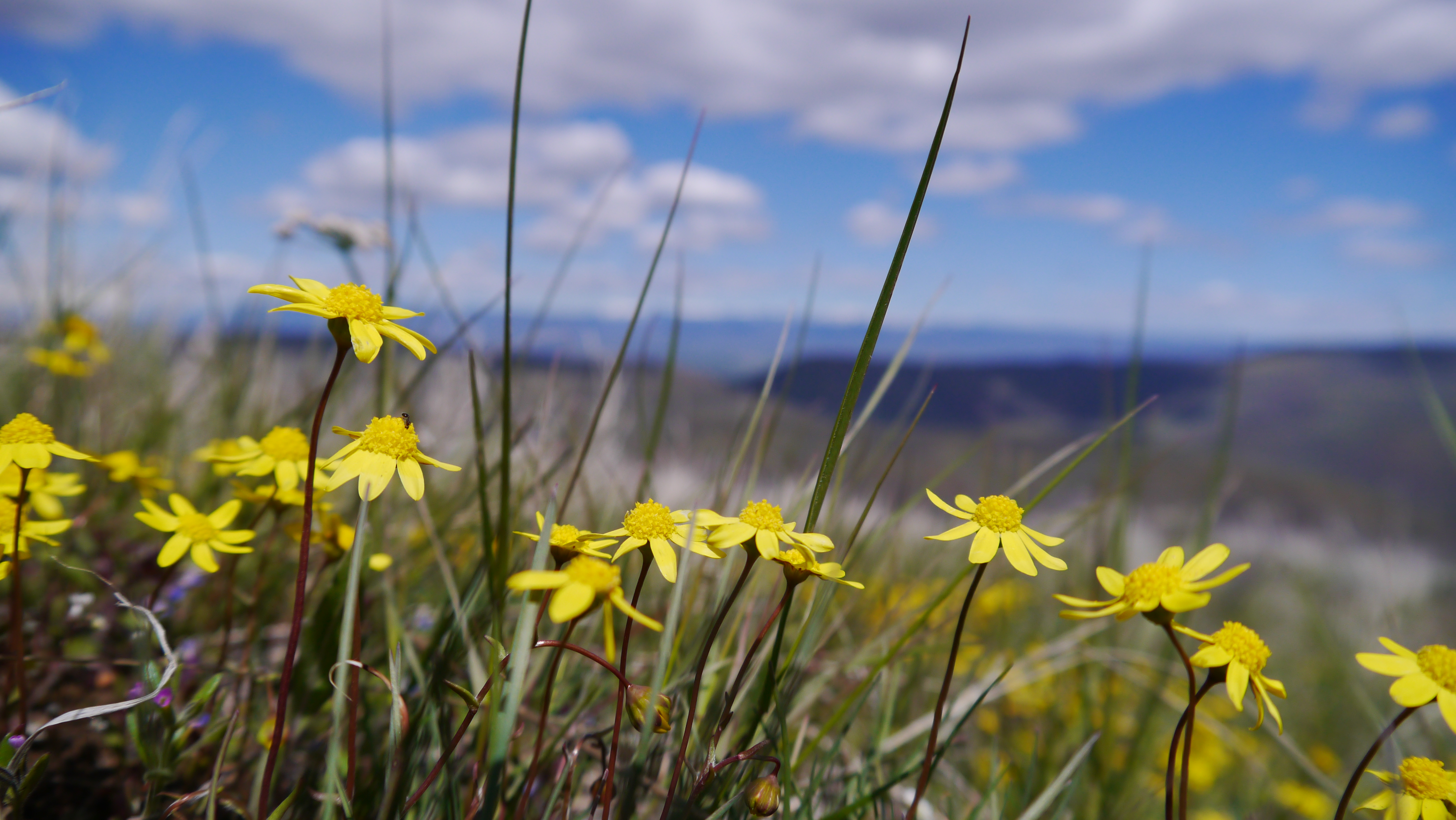
- Crocidium multicaule

Scientific classification
- Kingdom: Plantae
- Clade: Embryophytes
- Clade: Tracheophytes
- Clade: Angiosperms
- Clade: Eudicots
- Clade: Asterids
- Order: Asterales
- Family: Asteraceae
- Subfamily: Asteroideae
- Tribe: Senecioneae
- Genus: Crocidium; Hook.

Type species
- Crocidium multicaule Hook.

= Crocidium (plant) =

Genus of flowering plants

Crocidium is a small North American genus of plants in the daisy family. Species of the genus Crocidium are native to western North America (British Columbia, Washington, Idaho, Oregon, and California).

Species of the genus Crocidium can be found in varied habitats from grassland to woodland. They are small annual plants, typically not exceeding 30 centimeters (12 inches) in height. They grow from a small patch of somewhat fleshy leaves at the ground and erects several very tall, very thin gangly stems, each of which is topped with a flower head. The flower head is made up of five to 13 lemon yellow ray florets, each up to a centimeter long. The center of the head is filled with tiny disc florets, in a similar shade of bright yellow. The fruits are fuzzy brown achenes only one or two millimeters long which turn gluey when wet.

Species

- Crocidium multicaule Hook. - British Columbia, Washington, Idaho, Oregon, California
- Crocidium pugetense H.St.John - British Columbia, Washington
