= Erigeron yukonensis =

Scientific classification
- Kingdom: Plantae
- Clade: Tracheophytes
- Clade: Angiosperms
- Clade: Eudicots
- Clade: Asterids
- Order: Asterales
- Family: Asteraceae
- Genus: Erigeron
- Species: E. yukonensis

Binomial name
- Erigeron yukonensis Rydb.

Species of flowering plant

Erigeron yukonensis is a rare Arctic species of flowering plant in the family Asteraceae known by the common name Yukon fleabane. It is native to the northwestern corner of North America: Alaska, Yukon, Northwest Territories.

Erigeron yukonensis grows in rocky slopes and meadows, usually above the tree line. It is a branching perennial herb up to 40 centimeters (16 inches) tall, producing a taproot and a woody underground caudex. It generally produces 1-4 flower heads per stem. Each head contains 42–82 pink, purple, or white ray florets surrounding numerous yellow disc florets.
