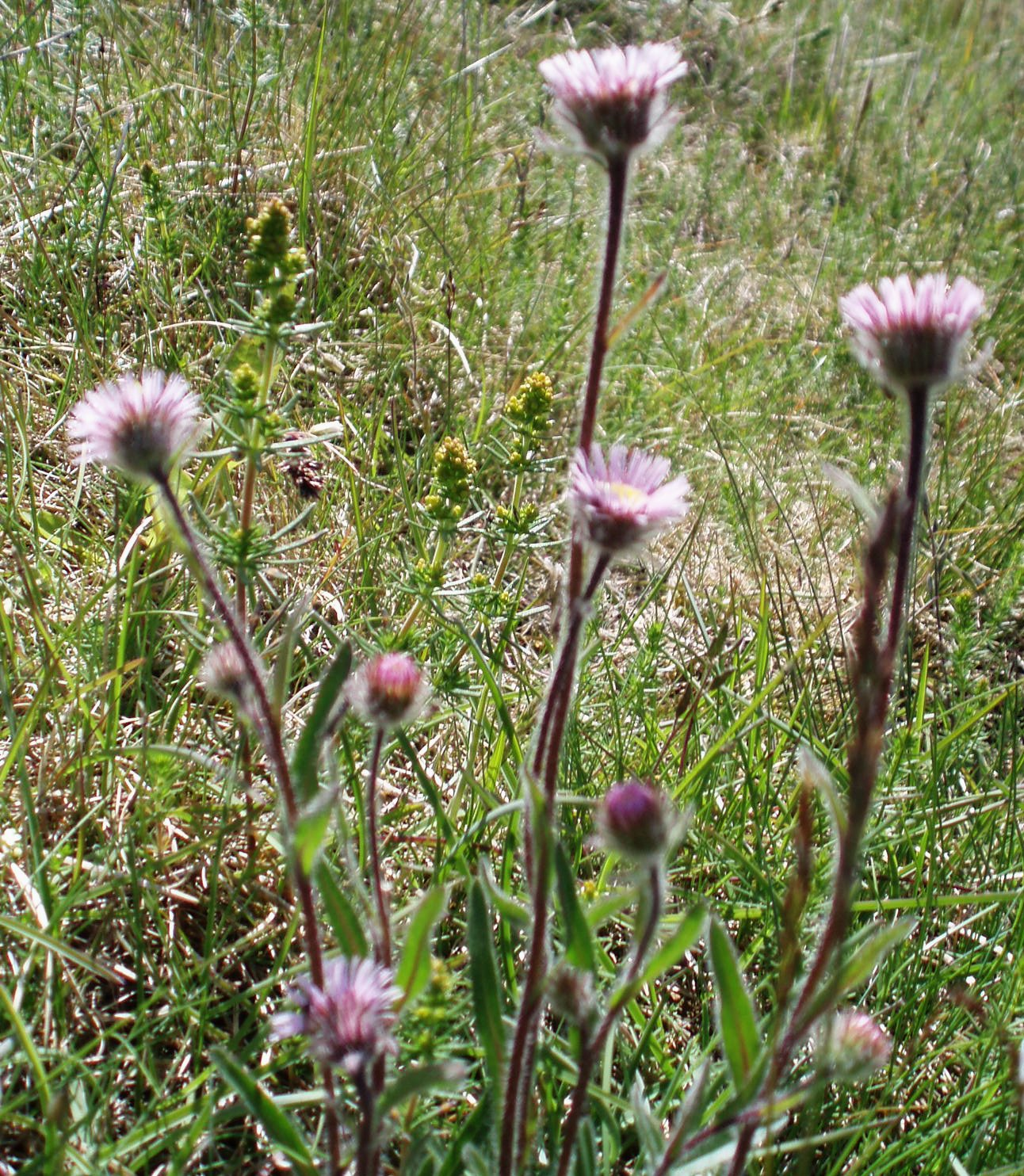

Scientific classification
- Kingdom: Plantae
- Clade: Tracheophytes
- Clade: Angiosperms
- Clade: Eudicots
- Clade: Asterids
- Order: Asterales
- Family: Asteraceae
- Genus: Erigeron
- Species: E. alpiniformis

Binomial name
- Erigeron alpiniformis Cronquist

Synonyms
- Erigeron borealis var. alpiniformis (Cronquist) Á.Löve; Trimorpha borealis Vierh.; Erigeron borealis (Vierh.) Simmons

= Erigeron alpiniformis =

Species of flowering plant

Erigeron alpiniformis is a rare Arctic species of flowering plants in the family Asteraceae, and one of several plants known by the common name alpine fleabane. It has been found only in Greenland (Kalaallit Nunaat, part of Denmark) and in Labrador and Nunavut in Canada.

Erigeron alpiniformis is a short, branching shrub rarely more than 20 cm (8 inches) tall. The inflorescence generally consists of 1 or 2, rarely 3 or 4 flower heads, each head with many small yellow disc florets and surrounded by a ring of 100–200 white or pinkish-purple ray florets.
