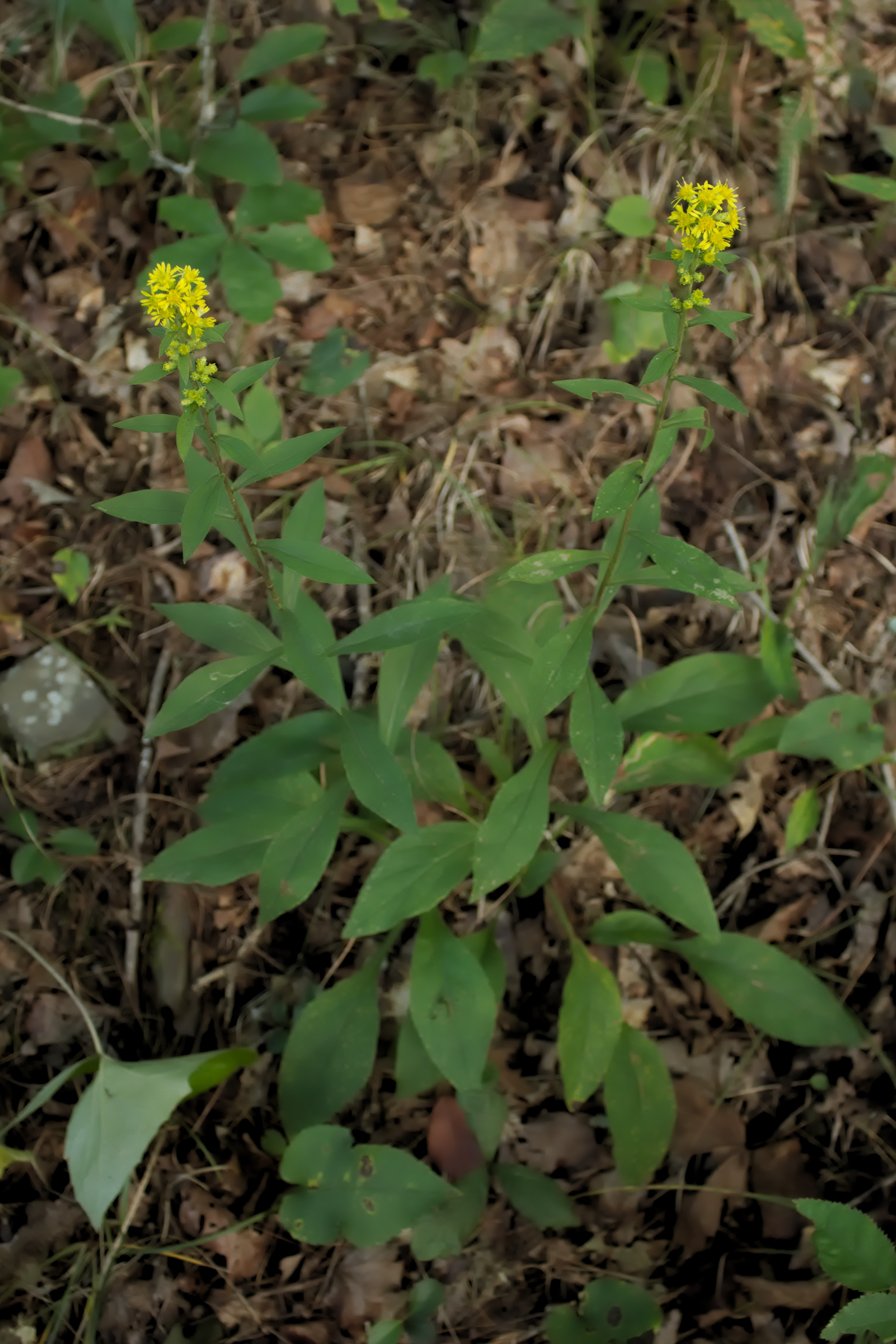
- Two ramets, beginning flowering

Scientific classification
- Kingdom: Plantae
- Clade: Tracheophytes
- Clade: Angiosperms
- Clade: Eudicots
- Clade: Asterids
- Order: Asterales
- Family: Asteraceae
- Genus: Solidago
- Species: S. squarrosa

Binomial name
- Solidago squarrosa Muhl. 1813

Synonyms
- Aster muehlenbergianus Kuntze; Solidago squamosa Nutt. ex Hook. 1834

= Solidago squarrosa =

Species of plant

Solidago squarrosa, commonly known as stout goldenrod, is a North American species of goldenrod in the family Asteraceae. It is native to Canada (Ontario, Québec, and New Brunswick) and the eastern United States (from Maine west to Indiana and south as far as Tennessee and the Carolinas).

Solidago squarrosa is a perennial herb up to 150 cm (5 feet) tall, with a branching underground caudex. Leaves are egg-shaped, up to 20 cm (8 inches) long near the base of the plant, shorter higher up the stem. One plant can produce as many as 200 small yellow flower heads in a narrow, elongate array at the top of the plant.

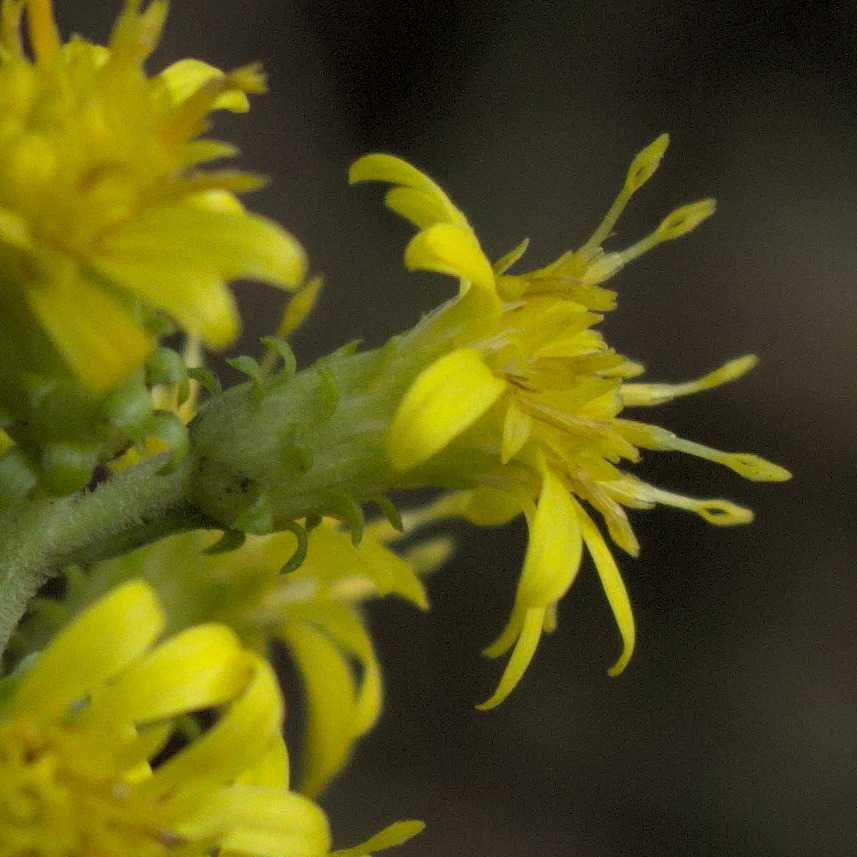
Magnification of pseudanthium, showing characteristic bent-back phyllaries

== Galls ==
This species is host to the following insect induced galls:

- Asteromyia carbonifera (Osten Sacken, 1862)

external link to gallformers
