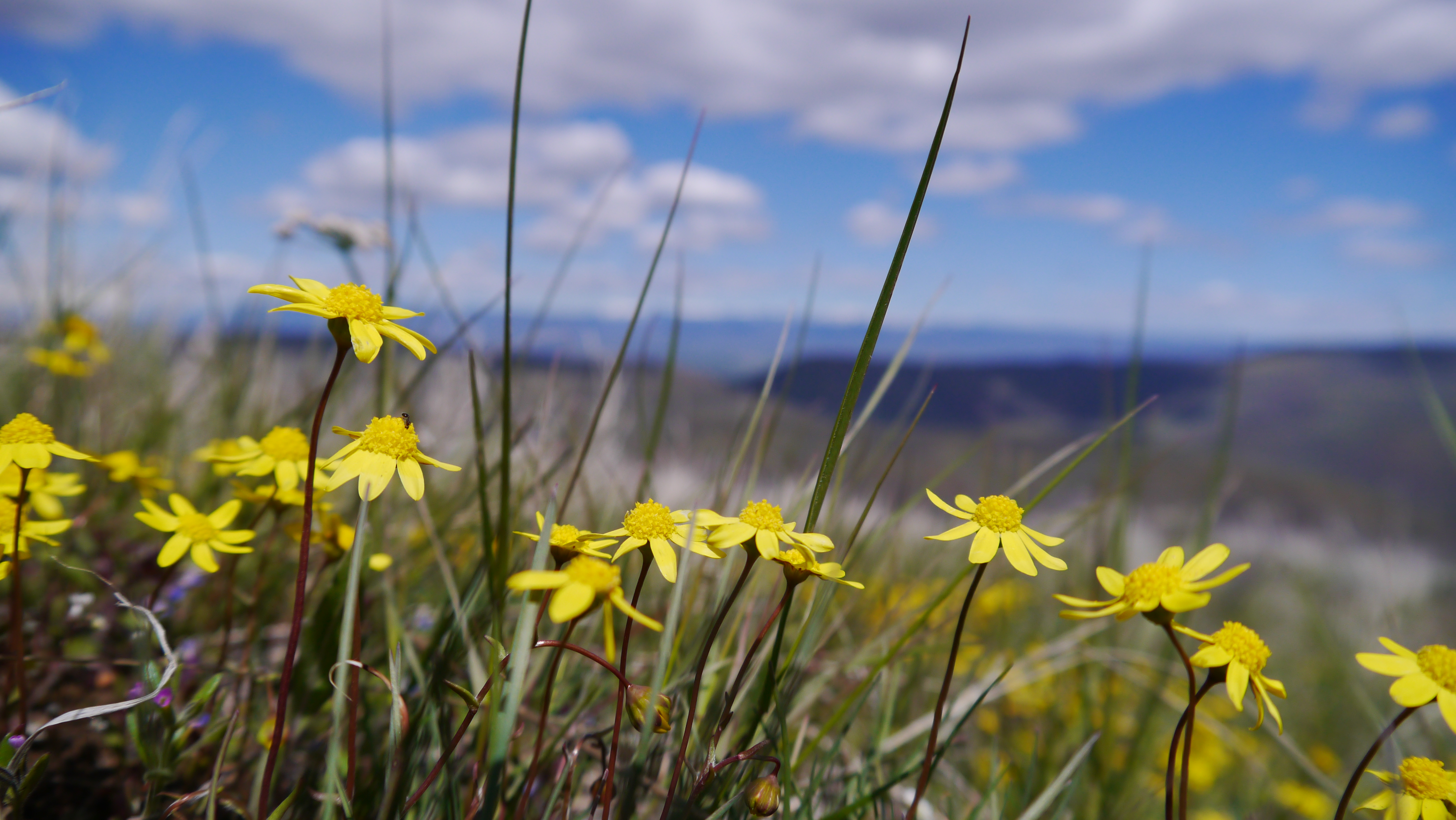
- Crocidium multicaule on Umtanum Ridge near Yakima River, Kittitas County Washington

Scientific classification
- Kingdom: Plantae
- Clade: Tracheophytes
- Clade: Angiosperms
- Clade: Eudicots
- Clade: Asterids
- Order: Asterales
- Family: Asteraceae
- Genus: Crocidium
- Species: C. multicaule

Binomial name
- Crocidium multicaule Hook.

= Crocidium multicaule =

Species of flowering plant

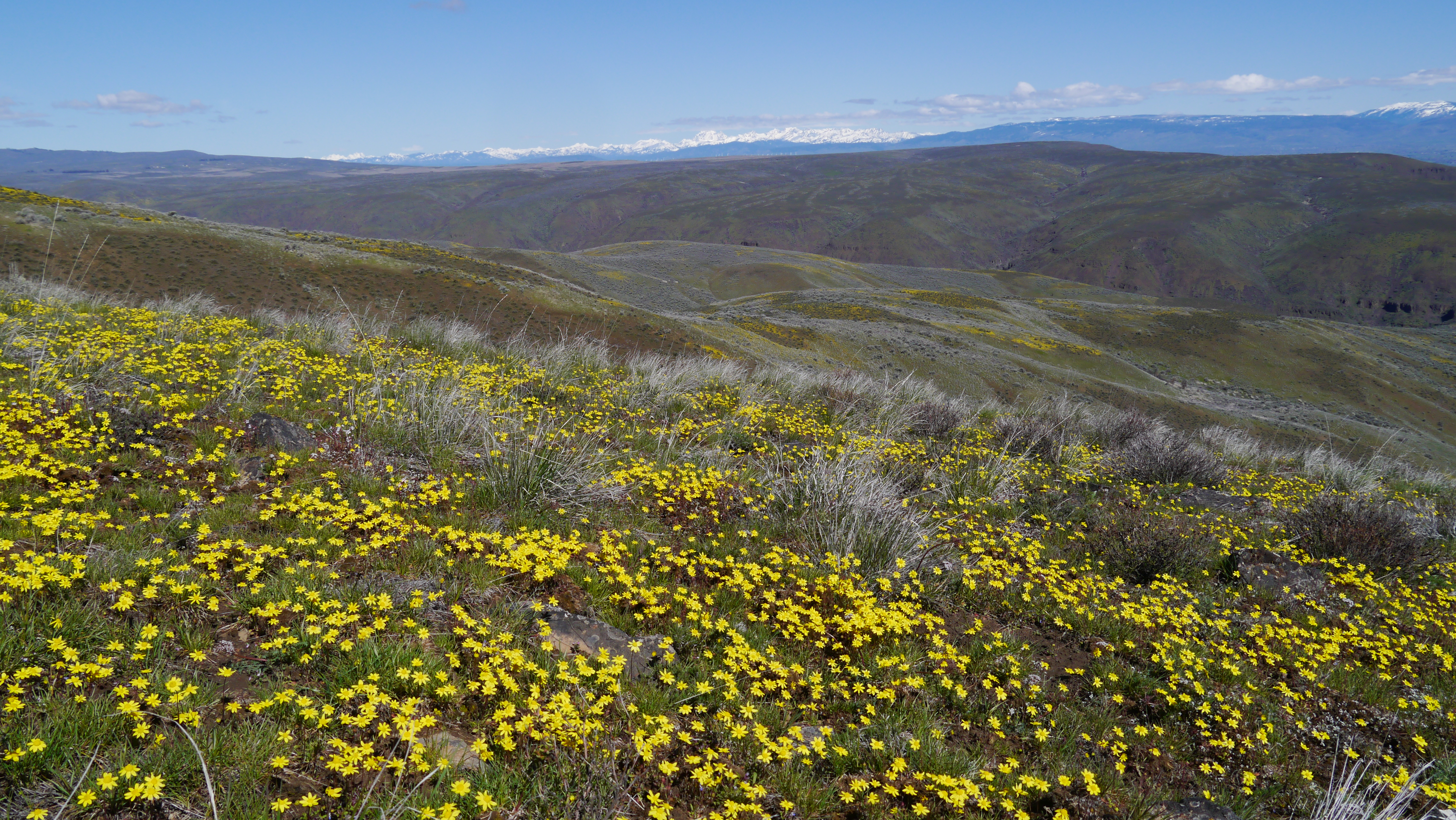
Crocidium multicaule on Umtanum Ridge near the Yakima River, Kittitas County Washington

Crocidium multicaule is a species of flowering plant in the daisy family known by the common name gold stars or spring gold.

== Description ==
Crocidium multicaule is a small annual, typically not exceeding 30 centimetres (12 in) in height when in flower. It grows from a low small patch of somewhat fleshy leaves at the ground and erects several tall thin stems, usually with reduced leaves on the lower part of the stem, and topped by a single flower head. The flower head is made up of five to 13 (usually 8) lemon yellow ray florets, each up to a centimeter long. The center of the head is filled with tiny disc florets, in a similar shade of bright yellow. The fruits are fuzzy brown achenes only one or two millimeters long which turn gluey when wet.

== Range and habitat ==
Crocidium multicaule is native to western North America from British Columbia to California, where it can be found in varied habitats from grassland to woodland, mostly in dry open habitat.

== Gallery ==
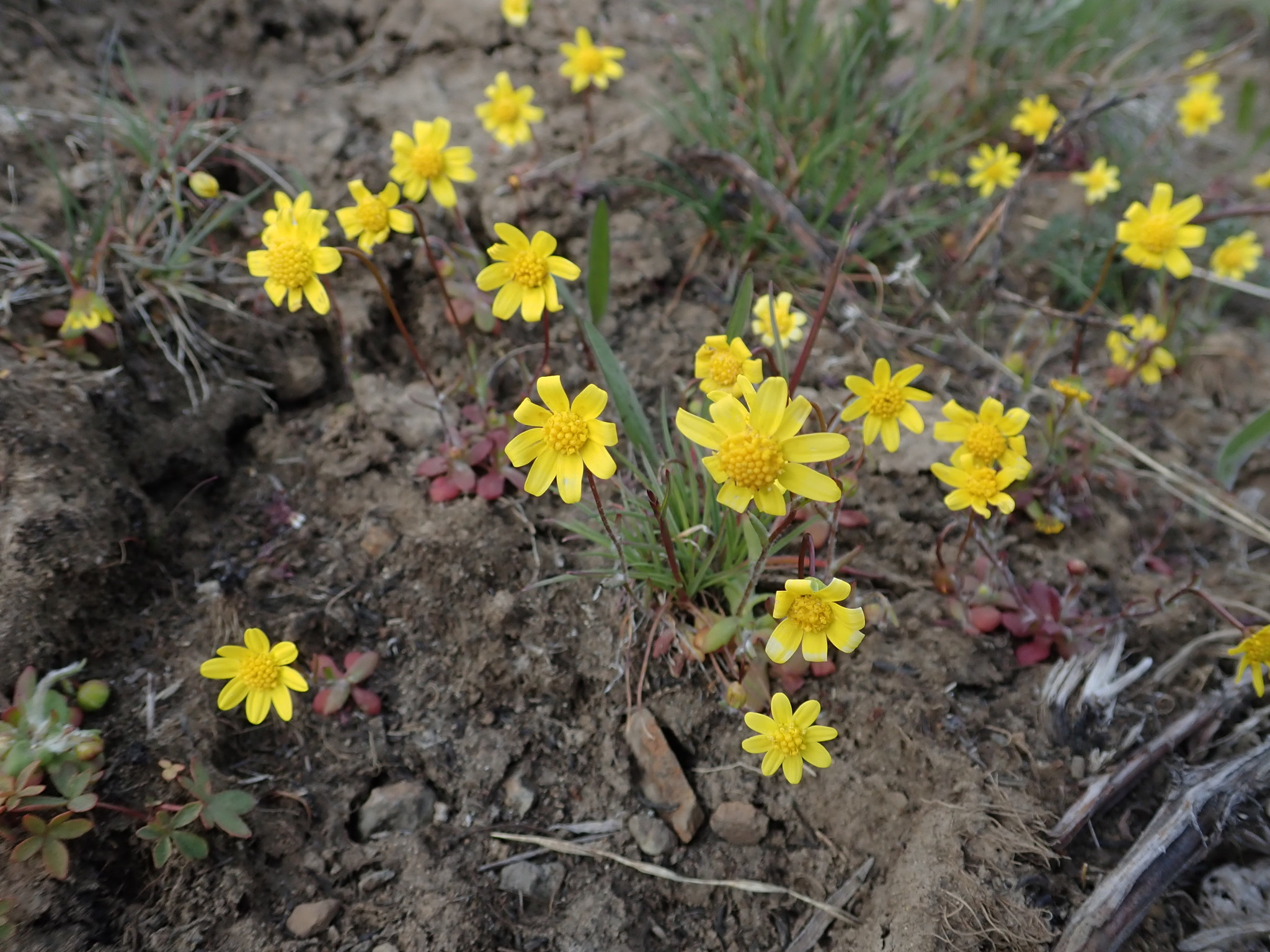
Flowering near Ellensburg, WA

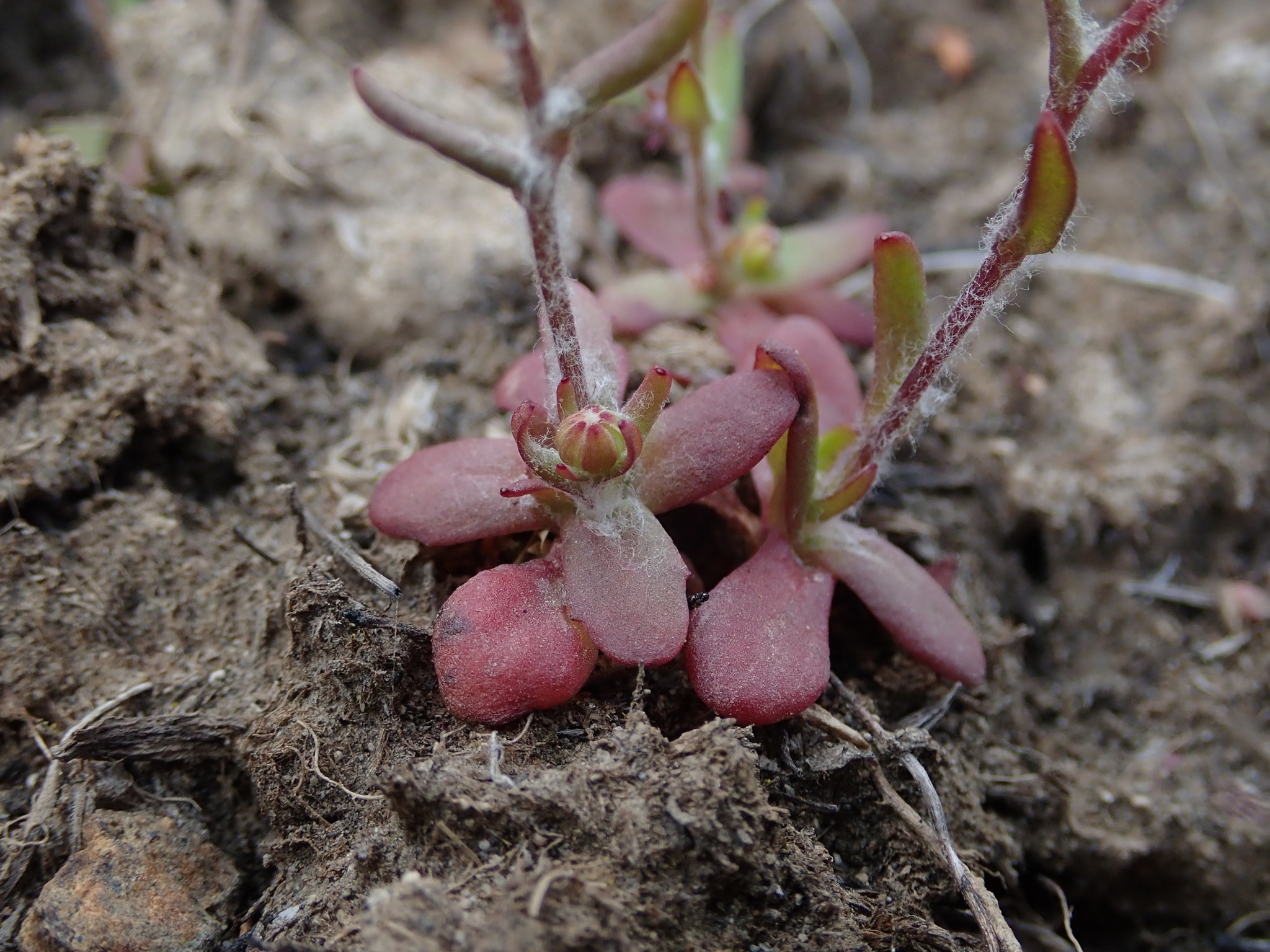
Foliage near Ellensburg, WA
