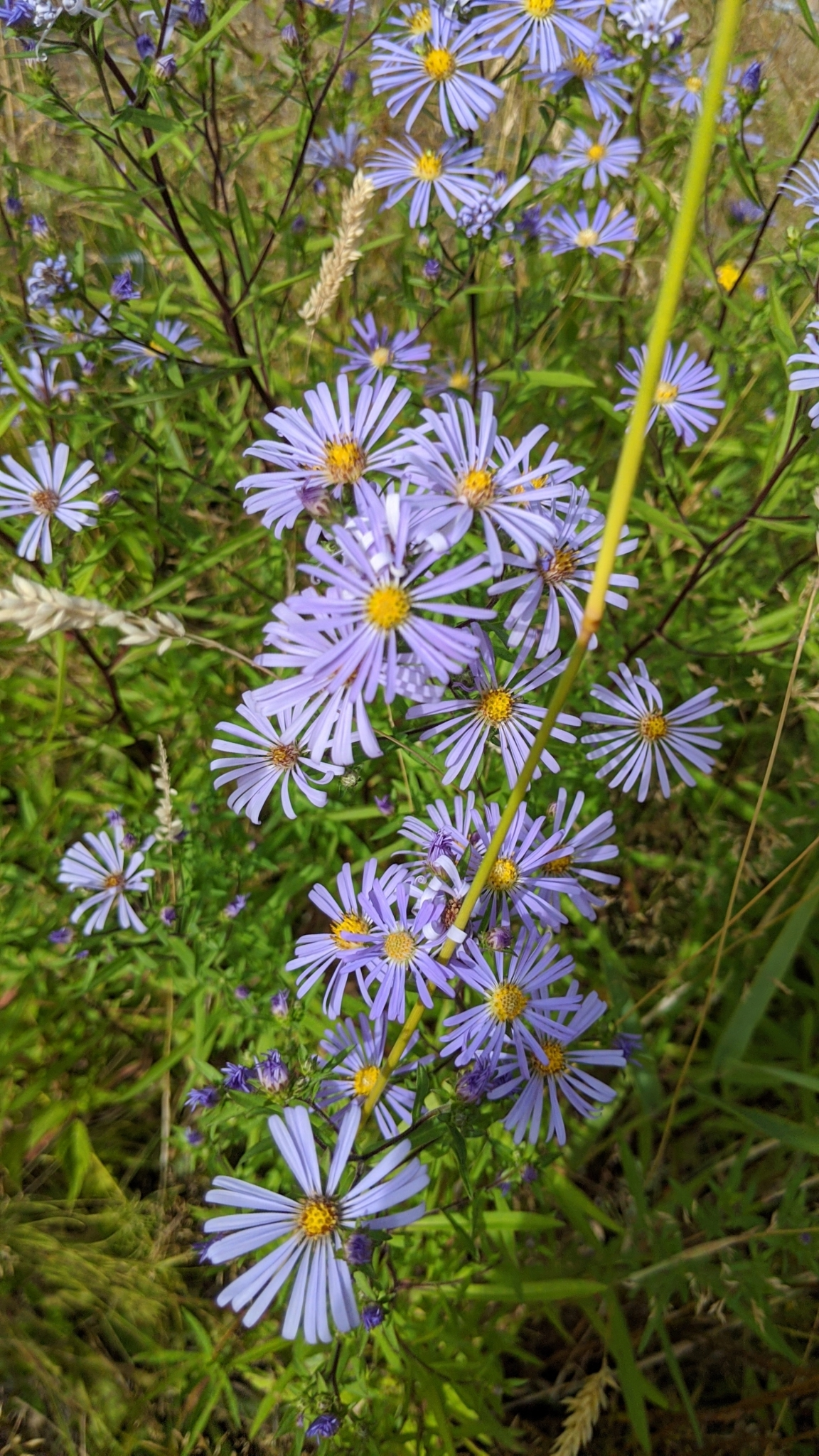

Conservation status
- Secure (NatureServe)

Scientific classification
- Kingdom: Plantae
- Clade: Tracheophytes
- Clade: Angiosperms
- Clade: Eudicots
- Clade: Asterids
- Order: Asterales
- Family: Asteraceae
- Tribe: Astereae
- Subtribe: Symphyotrichinae
- Genus: Symphyotrichum
- Subgenus: Symphyotrichum subg. Symphyotrichum
- Section: Symphyotrichum sect. Occidentales
- Species: S. subspicatum

Binomial name
- Symphyotrichum subspicatum (Nees) G.L.Nesom
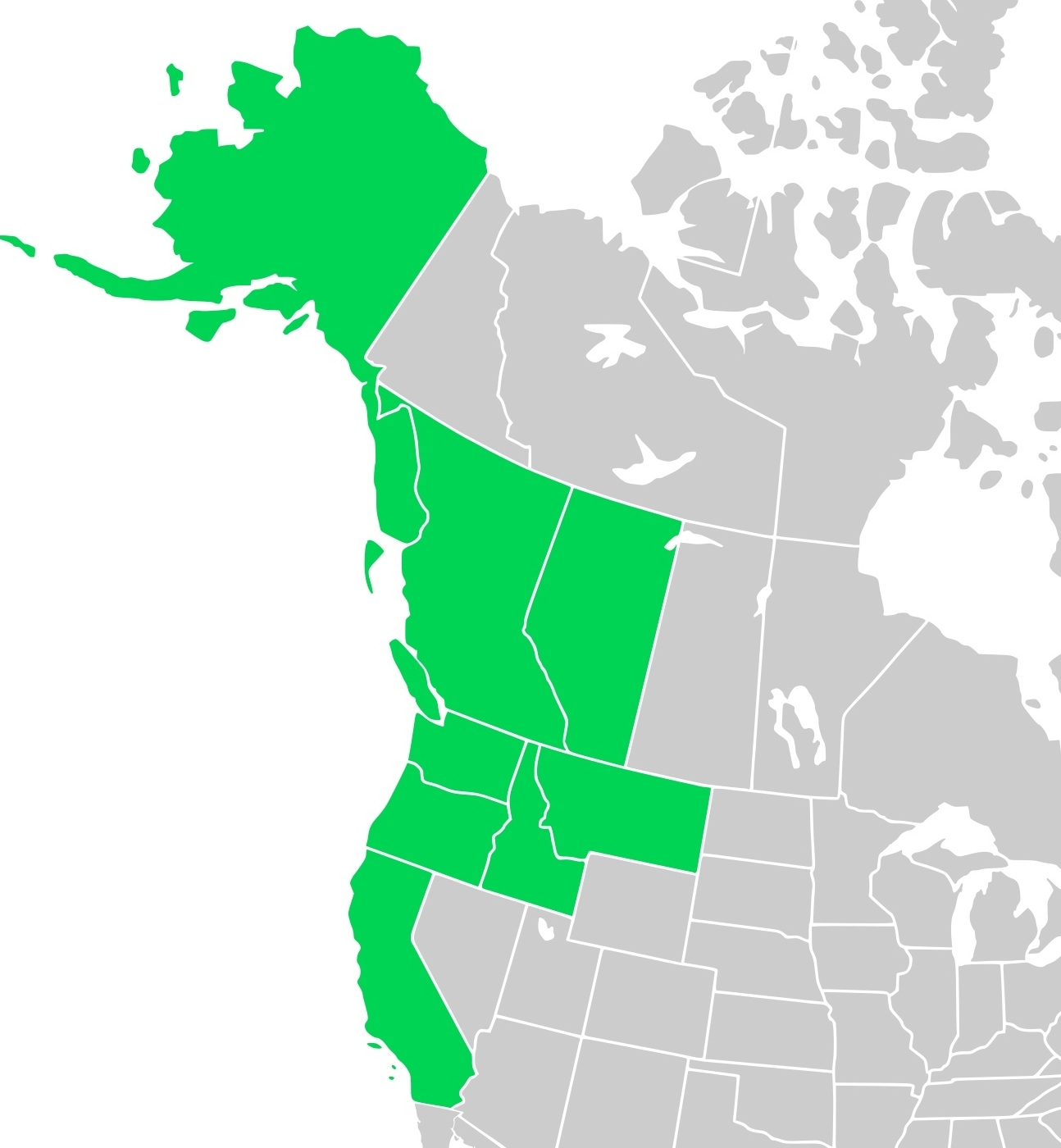
- Native distribution

Synonyms
- Basionym: Aster subspicatus Nees; Alphabetical list: Aster butleri Rydb.; Aster ciliolatus var. maccallae (Rydb.) A.G.Jones; Aster douglasii Lindl.; Aster grayi Suksd.; Aster maccallae Rydb.; Aster oreganus Torr. & A.Gray; Aster subspicatus var. grayi (Suksd.) Cronquist; Symphyotrichum ciliolatum var. maccallae (Rydb.) G.L.Nesom; Symphyotrichum subspicatum var. grayi (Suksd.) G.L.Nesom; Tripolium oregonum Nutt.

= Symphyotrichum subspicatum =

Species of flowering plant

Symphyotrichum subspicatum (formerly Aster subspicatus) is a species of flowering plant in the family Asteraceae native to western North America. Commonly known as Douglas' aster, it is a perennial, herbaceous plant that may reach 40 to 120 centimeters (1 to 4 feet) tall. Its flowers have violet ray florets and yellow then reddish disk florets.
