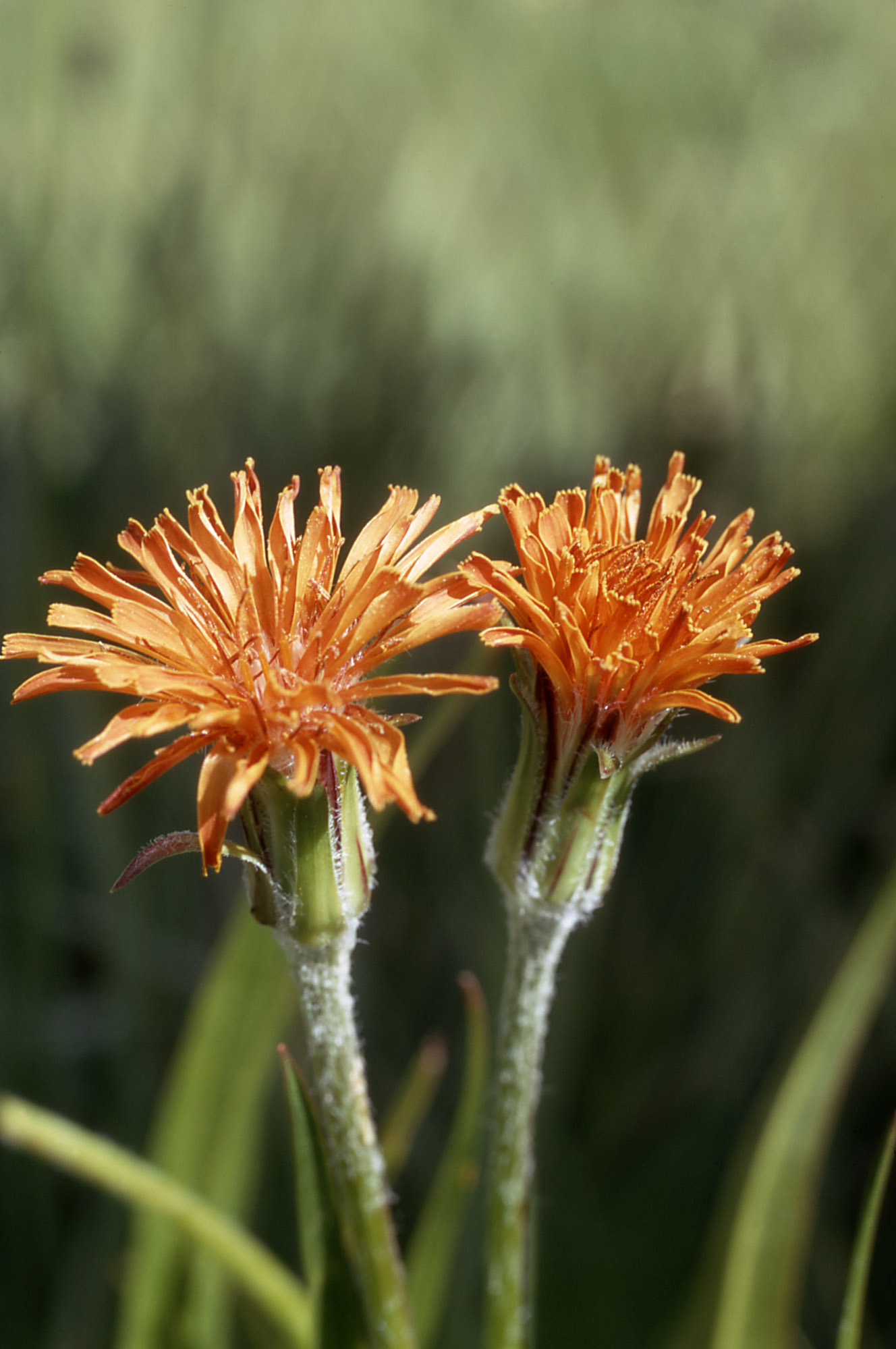
- Agoseris aurantiaca var. aurantiaca

Conservation status
- Secure (NatureServe)

Scientific classification
- Kingdom: Plantae
- Clade: Tracheophytes
- Clade: Angiosperms
- Clade: Eudicots
- Clade: Asterids
- Order: Asterales
- Family: Asteraceae
- Genus: Agoseris
- Species: A. aurantiaca

Binomial name
- Agoseris aurantiaca (Hook.) Greene

Synonyms
- Synonymy: Agoseris angustissima Greene; Agoseris arachnoidea Rydb.; Agoseris arizonica (Greene) Greene; Agoseris attenuata Rydb.; Agoseris carnea Rydb.; Agoseris confinis Greene; Agoseris frondifera Osterh.; Agoseris gaspensis Fernald; Agoseris gracilens (A.Gray) Kuntze; Agoseris gracilens (A.Gray) Greene; Agoseris gracilenta Greene; Agoseris graminifolia Greene; Agoseris greenei (A.Gray) Rydb.; Agoseris howellii Greene; Agoseris humilis Rydb. 1905 not (Benth.) Kuntze 1891; Agoseris lackschewitzii Douglass M.Hend. & R.K.Moseley; Agoseris longirostris Greene; Agoseris nana Rydb; Agoseris naskapensis J.Rousseau & Raymond; Agoseris prionophylla Greene; Agoseris purpurea (A.Gray) Greene; Agoseris roseata Rydb.; Agoseris subalpina G.N.Jones; Agoseris vulcanica Greene; Microrhynchus aurantiacus Fisch. & C.A.Mey.; Microrhynchus purpureus A.Gray; Microrhynchus troximoides Torr. & A.Gray; Stylopappus pumilus D.Dietr.; Troximon arachnoideum (Rydb.) A.Nelson; Troximon arizonicum Greene; Troximon aurantiacum Hook.; Troximon gracilens A.Gray; Troximon purpureum (A.Gray) Greene

= Agoseris aurantiaca =

Species of flowering plant

Agoseris aurantiaca is a species of plant in the family Asteraceae, commonly called orange agoseris, pink false dandelion or mountain dandelion. It is widespread in western North America.

== Description ==
Agoseris aurantiaca is a perennial herb or subshrub growing to 60 centimeters (24 inches) in height. It produces a basal rosette of leaves, which are 5–35 cm (2–14 in) long and entire or with irregular tooth-like lobes. There is no stem, but it does produce several stem-like peduncles. Between June and August, each peduncle bears a single flower head 2.5 cm (1 in) in width, surrounded by glabrous to hairy phyllaries. The head is ligulate, containing several ray florets but no disc florets. The florets are most commonly orange but are occasionally yellow, pink, red, or purple. The binominal name "Aurantiaca" means "orange-red". The flower head matures into a ball-like head of beaked achenes, each with a terminal pappus of numerous, white bristles.

It is the only orange-flowered species in the genus, the others typically being yellow.

Varieties

- Agoseris aurantiaca var. aurantiaca – most of species range
- Agoseris aurantiaca var. purpurea (A.Gray) Cronquist – southern Rocky Mountains

== Distribution and habitat ==
The species is widespread and common in western North America from Alaska and the Northwest Territories in Canada, southward to California, Arizona, and New Mexico, and eastward as far as the Rocky Mountains and the Black Hills. There are also isolated populations in the Chic-Choc Mountains on the Gaspé Peninsula and in the Otish Mountains of central Quebec.

It is primarily a species of mountainous regions and may be found in wet to dry habitats.

== Uses ==
A cold infusion of this plant is used by the Ramah Navajo for protection against witches.
