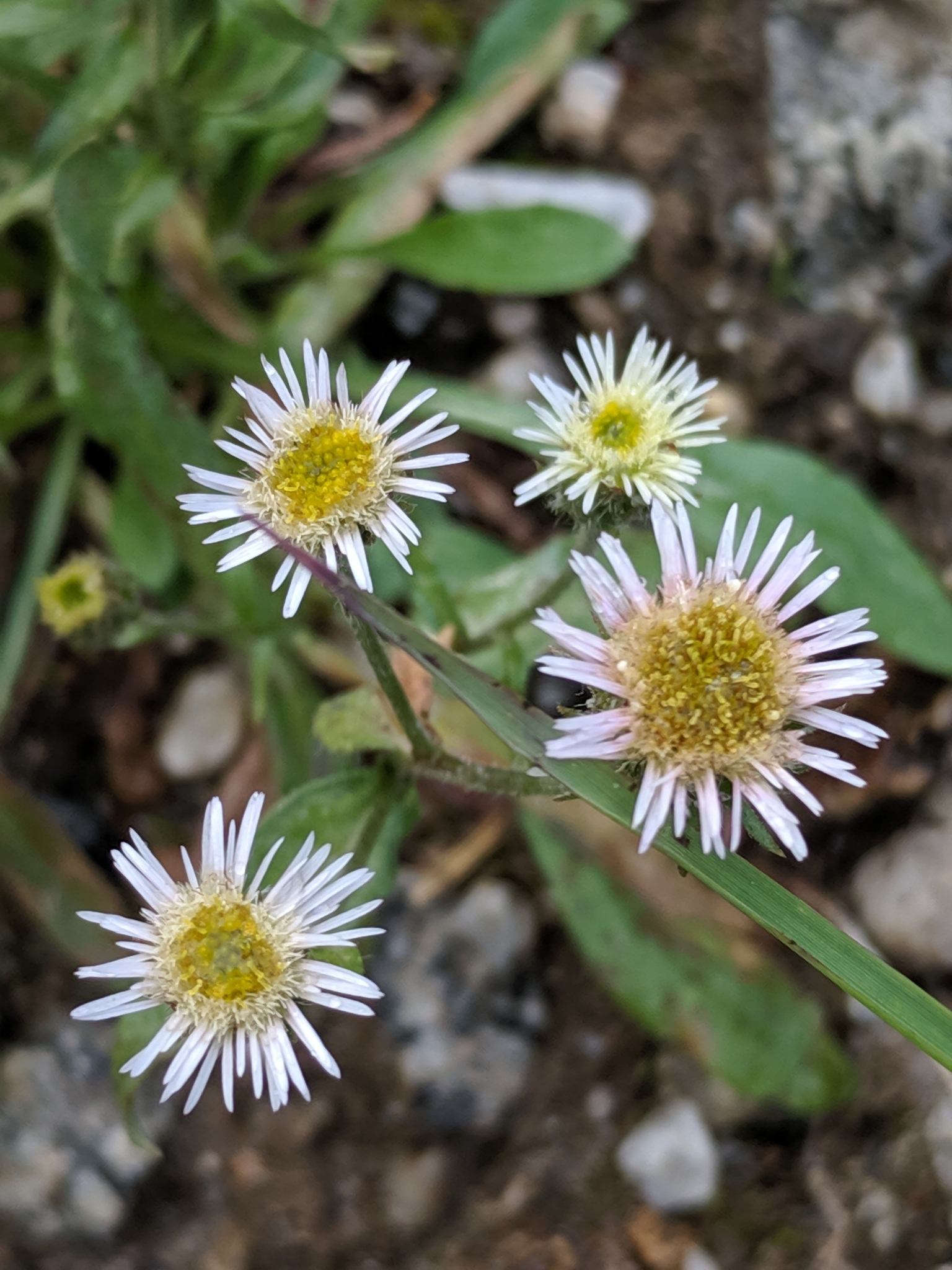

Conservation status
- Secure (NatureServe)

Scientific classification
- Kingdom: Plantae
- Clade: Tracheophytes
- Clade: Angiosperms
- Clade: Eudicots
- Clade: Asterids
- Order: Asterales
- Family: Asteraceae
- Genus: Erigeron
- Species: E. nivalis

Binomial name
- Erigeron nivalis Nutt.

Synonyms
- Synonymy: Erigeron nivale Nutt.; Erigeron acris subsp. debilis (A.Gray) Piper; Erigeron acris var. debilis A.Gray; Erigeron angulosus subsp. debilis (A.Gray) Piper; Erigeron debilis (A.Gray) Rydb.; Erigeron elatus var. bakeri Greene; Erigeron jucundus Greene; Erigeron scotteri B.Boivin; Trimorpha acris var. debilis (A.Gray) G.L.Nesom; Trimorpha scotteri (B.Boivin) G.L.Nesom

= Erigeron nivalis =

Species of flowering plant

Erigeron nivalis is a North American species of flowering plant in the family Asteraceae, called the northern daisy. It is widespread across much of western North America from Alaska east to Northwest Territories and south as far as California and New Mexico.

Erigeron nivalis is a biennial or perennial herb up to 35 centimeters (14 inches) tall. The plant generally produces 1-8 flower heads per stem, each head with up to 70 white or pink ray florets surrounding numerous yellow disc florets. The species grows in rocky sites and meadows in open woods and subalpine areas.
