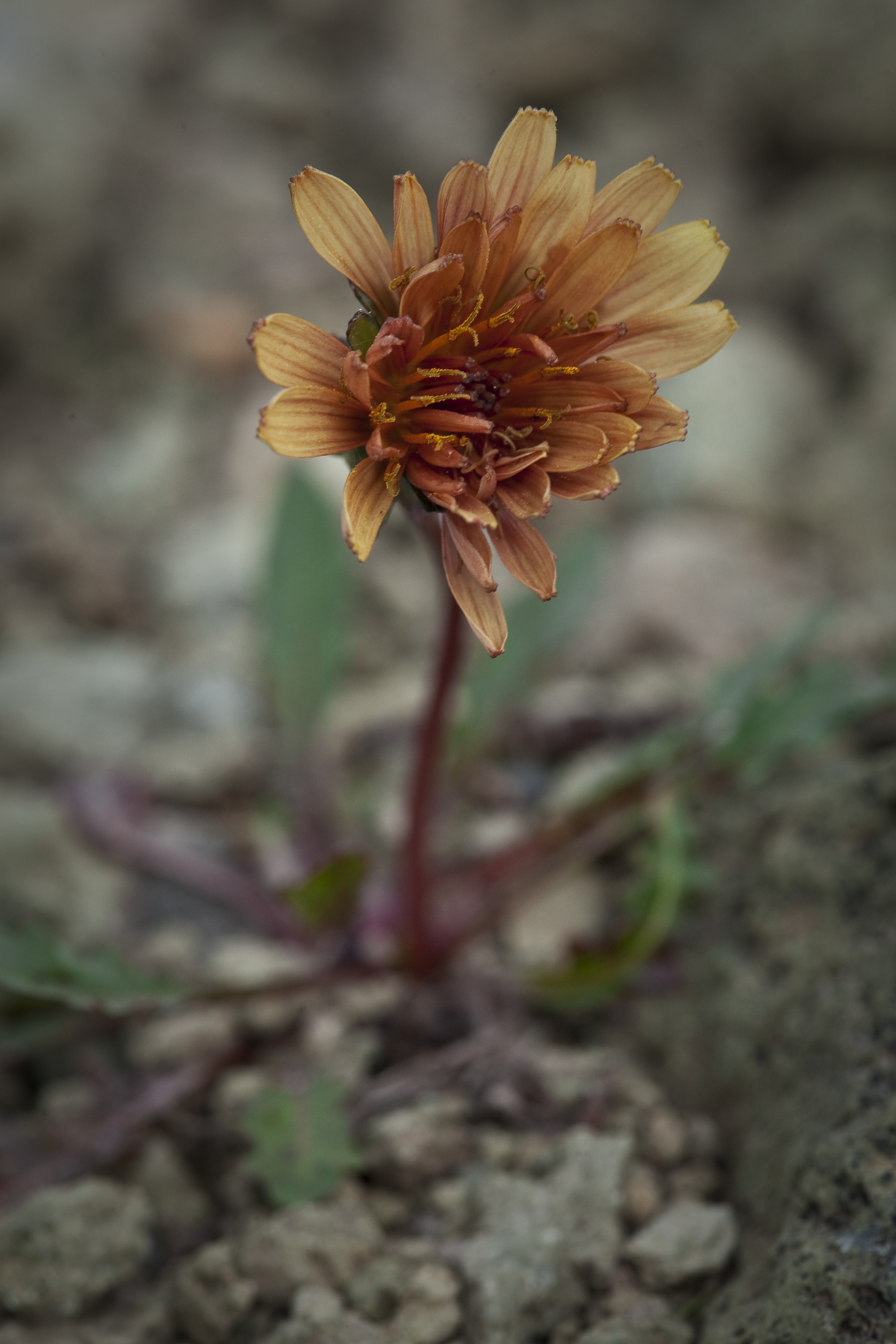

Scientific classification
- Kingdom: Plantae
- Clade: Tracheophytes
- Clade: Angiosperms
- Clade: Eudicots
- Clade: Asterids
- Order: Asterales
- Family: Asteraceae
- Genus: Taraxacum
- Species: T. carneocoloratum

Binomial name
- Taraxacum carneocoloratum A.Nelson 1945

= Taraxacum carneocoloratum =

Species of flowering plant

Taraxacum carneocoloratum, also known as the pink dandelion or fleshy dandelion, is a perennial species of dandelion. The species is endemic to Yukon and Alaska, occurring only in unglaciated areas of western Yukon, specifically North Fork Pass in the Ogilvie Mountains and Ivvavik National Park. The species is characterized by the absence of horns or tubercles on the tips of the involucral bracts, a typically small height of less than 9 cm, pink to flesh-colored petals, and a yellowish pappus. It blooms between June and August. The species was first described in 1945.
