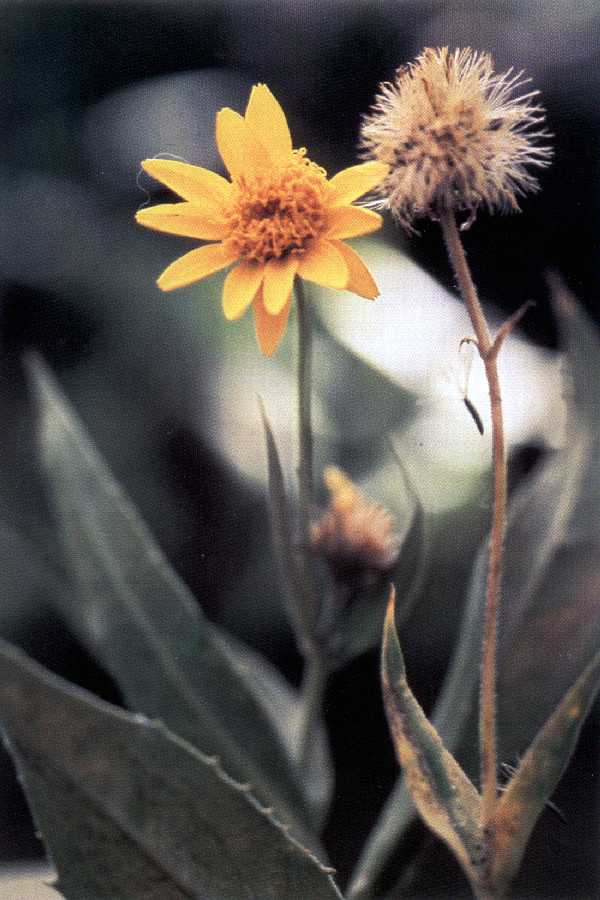
- Arnica lanceolata subsp. prima California

Scientific classification
- Kingdom: Plantae
- Clade: Tracheophytes
- Clade: Angiosperms
- Clade: Eudicots
- Clade: Asterids
- Order: Asterales
- Family: Asteraceae
- Genus: Arnica
- Species: A. lanceolata

Binomial name
- Arnica lanceolata Nutt.

Synonyms
- Arnica mollis var. petiolaris Fernald; Arnica petiolaris (Fernald) Rydb.; Arnica amplexicaulis Nutt., syn of subsp. prima; Arnica amplexifolia Rydb., syn of subsp. prima

= Arnica lanceolata =

Species of flowering plant

Arnica lanceolata is a North American species of flowering plant in the family Asteraceae, known by the common name clasping arnica or lanceleaf arnica. It has a disjunct (discontinuous) distribution in western North America and northeastern North America.

Arnica lanceolata is a perennial herb usually growing from a small rhizome and producing one or more hairy, glandular stems. The stems are lined with 5 to 10 pairs of oval-shaped, toothed leaves up to 12 centimeters long. The inflorescence is a cluster of several daisy-like flower heads with a center of brownish disc florets and a fringe of yellow ray florets 1 to 2 centimeters long. The fruit is a cylindrical achene covered in hairs and with a light brown pappus at one end. It grows in moist areas, along stream banks, and montane to alpine meadows.

Subspecies

- Arnica lanceolata subsp. lanceolata - Quebec, New Brunswick, Maine, New Hampshire, Vermont, New York
- Arnica lanceolata subsp. prima (Maguire) Strother & S.J.Wolf - Alaska, Yukon, Northwest Territories, Alberta, British Columbia, Washington, Oregon, California, Idaho, Montana, Utah, Wyoming, Nevada
