= Erigeron hyperboreus =

Scientific classification
- Kingdom: Plantae
- Clade: Tracheophytes
- Clade: Angiosperms
- Clade: Eudicots
- Clade: Asterids
- Order: Asterales
- Family: Asteraceae
- Genus: Erigeron
- Species: E. hyperboreus

Binomial name
- Erigeron hyperboreus Greene

Synonyms
- Erigeron alaskanus Cronquist

Species of flowering plant

Erigeron hyperboreus is a rare Arctic species of flowering plant in the family Asteraceae known by the common name tundra fleabane. It has been found only in arctic tundra in Alaska, Yukon, and Northwest Territories.

== Description ==
Erigeron hyperboreus is a small perennial her rarely more than 15 centimeters (6 inches) tall, spreading by means of underground rhizomes. Each plant generally produces only one flower head, with 30-60 white or blue ray florets surrounding yellow disc florets.
