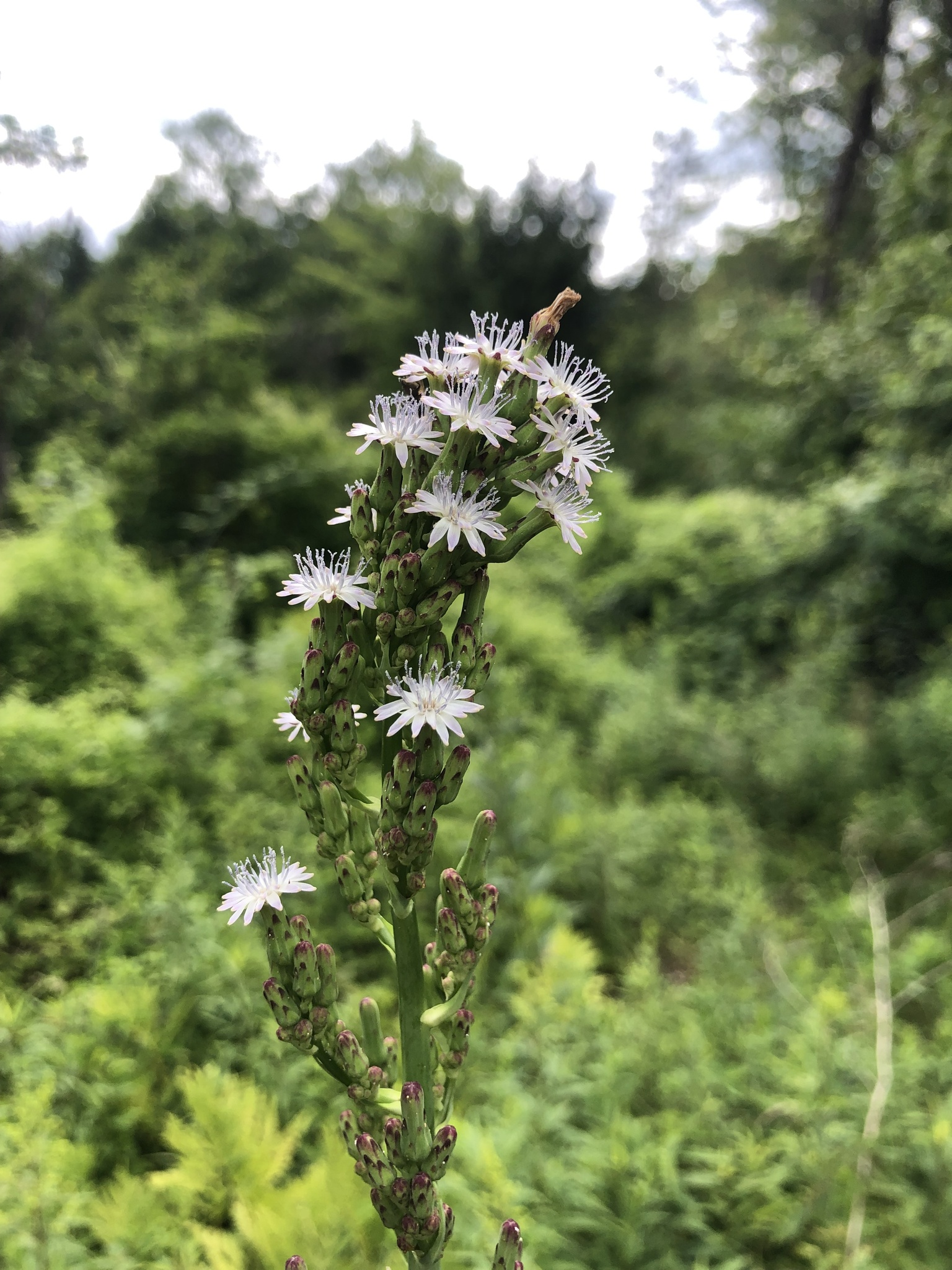
- Lactuca biennis flowers blooming

Conservation status
- Secure (NatureServe)

Scientific classification
- Kingdom: Plantae
- Clade: Tracheophytes
- Clade: Angiosperms
- Clade: Eudicots
- Clade: Asterids
- Order: Asterales
- Family: Asteraceae
- Genus: Lactuca
- Species: L. biennis

Binomial name
- Lactuca biennis (Moench) Fernald 1940

Synonyms
- List: Agathyrsus floridanus D.Don (1828); Cicerbita spicata Beauverd (1910); Eunoxis amabilis Raf. (1838); Lactuca spicata Hitchc. (1891); Lactuca terrae-novae Fernald (1927); Mulgedium spicatum Small (1913); Sonchus biennis Moench (1794); Sonchus spicatus Lam. (1792)

= Lactuca biennis =

Tall blue lettuce

Species of lettuce

Lactuca biennis is a North American species of wild lettuce known by the common names tall blue lettuce and blue wood lettuce. It is widespread across much of the United States and Canada from Alaska and Yukon south as far as California, New Mexico, and Georgia.

Lactuca biennis is a biennial herb in the dandelion tribe within the daisy family growing from a taproot to heights anywhere from one half to four meters (20 inches to over 13 feet). There are deeply lobed, toothed leaves all along the stem. The top of the stem bears a multibranched inflorescence with many flower heads. Each head is just over a centimeter (0.4 inches) wide and has many whitish to light blue ray florets but no disc florets. The fruit is a mottled achene about half a centimeter (0.2 inches) long with a brownish pappus.

Lactuca biennis was described botanically in 1794, with the name Sonchus biennis, then transferred to Lactuca in 1940.
