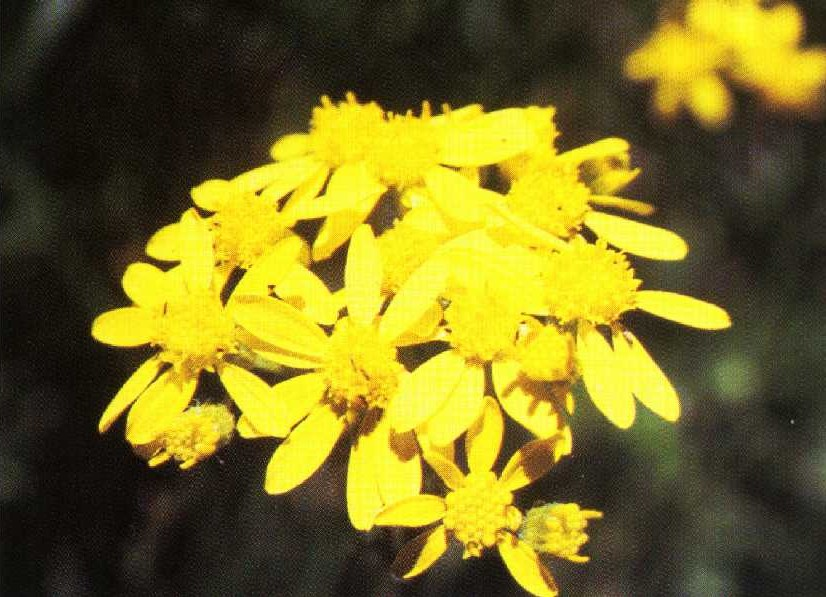

Conservation status
- Secure (NatureServe)

Scientific classification
- Kingdom: Plantae
- Clade: Tracheophytes
- Clade: Angiosperms
- Clade: Eudicots
- Clade: Asterids
- Order: Asterales
- Family: Asteraceae
- Genus: Senecio
- Species: S. hydrophilus

Binomial name
- Senecio hydrophilus Nutt.

= Senecio hydrophilus =

Species of flowering plant

Senecio hydrophilus is a species of flowering plant in the aster family known by the common names water ragwort and alkali-marsh ragwort. It is native to western North America from British Columbia to California to Colorado, where it grows in swampy places such as marshes. It can grow in standing water, including alkaline and salty water. It is a biennial or perennial herb producing a single upright stem or a cluster of a few stems which may exceed one meter in maximum height, at times approaching two meters. The stem is hollow, waxy in texture, and often pale green in color, and it emerges from a small caudex. The thick leaves are lance-shaped to oval with smooth or toothed edges, the blades up to 20 centimeters long and borne on petioles. Smaller leaves occur higher up the stem. The inflorescence is one or more large, spreading clusters of many flower heads. They contain many yellowish disc florets at the center and sometimes have small yellow ray florets as well.
