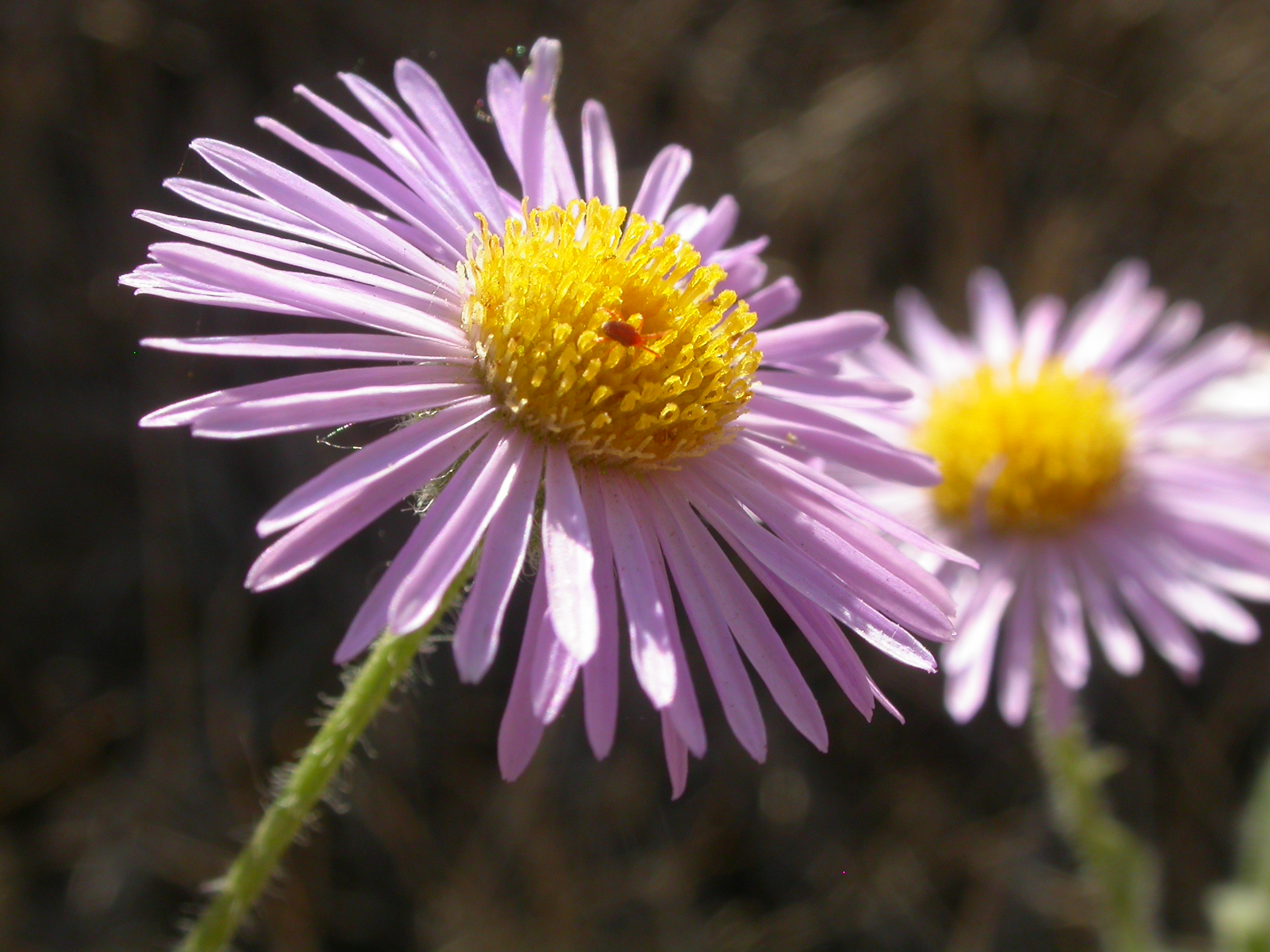

Conservation status
- Secure (NatureServe)

Scientific classification
- Kingdom: Plantae
- Clade: Tracheophytes
- Clade: Angiosperms
- Clade: Eudicots
- Clade: Asterids
- Order: Asterales
- Family: Asteraceae
- Genus: Erigeron
- Species: E. pumilus

Binomial name
- Erigeron pumilus Nutt.

Synonyms
- Synonymy: Erigeron pumilum Nutt.; Tessenia pumila (Nutt.) Lunell; Erigeron hirsutus Pursh 1813 not Lour. 1790; Erigeron pumilus f. diabolicus Cronquist; Erigeron sulcatus Nees 1841 not Meyen 1834; Fragmosa pumila (Nutt.) Raf.; Erigeron hispidissimus (Hook.) Piper, syn of var. intermedius; Erigeron pumilus var. gracilior Cronquist, syn of var. intermedius; Erigeron pumilus subsp. intermedius Cronquist, syn of var. intermedius; Erigeron strigosus var. hispidissimus Hook., syn of var. intermedius

= Erigeron pumilus =

Species of flowering plant

Erigeron pumilus, the shaggy fleabane, or vernal daisy, is a hairy North American species of perennial plants in the family Asteraceae. It is widespread across much of western Canada and the western United States, from British Columbia east to Saskatchewan and south as far as Oklahoma and the San Bernardino Mountains of California. There have been reports of the plant growing in Yukon Territory, but these were based on misidentified specimens.

Erigeron pumilus is a perennial herb up to 50 cm (20 inches) tall with a thick taproot. Leaves and stems are both covered with many stiff hairs. Flower heads usually come in groups of 1-5 heads, but occasionally in large arrays of as many as 50. Each head has 50–100 white or pink (rarely pale blue) ray florets surrounding many yellow disc florets. The species grows mostly on dry slopes and plains, often among sagebrush or in prairies.

"Pumilus" means "dwarf", referring to the small size of this hairy little plant.

Subspecies

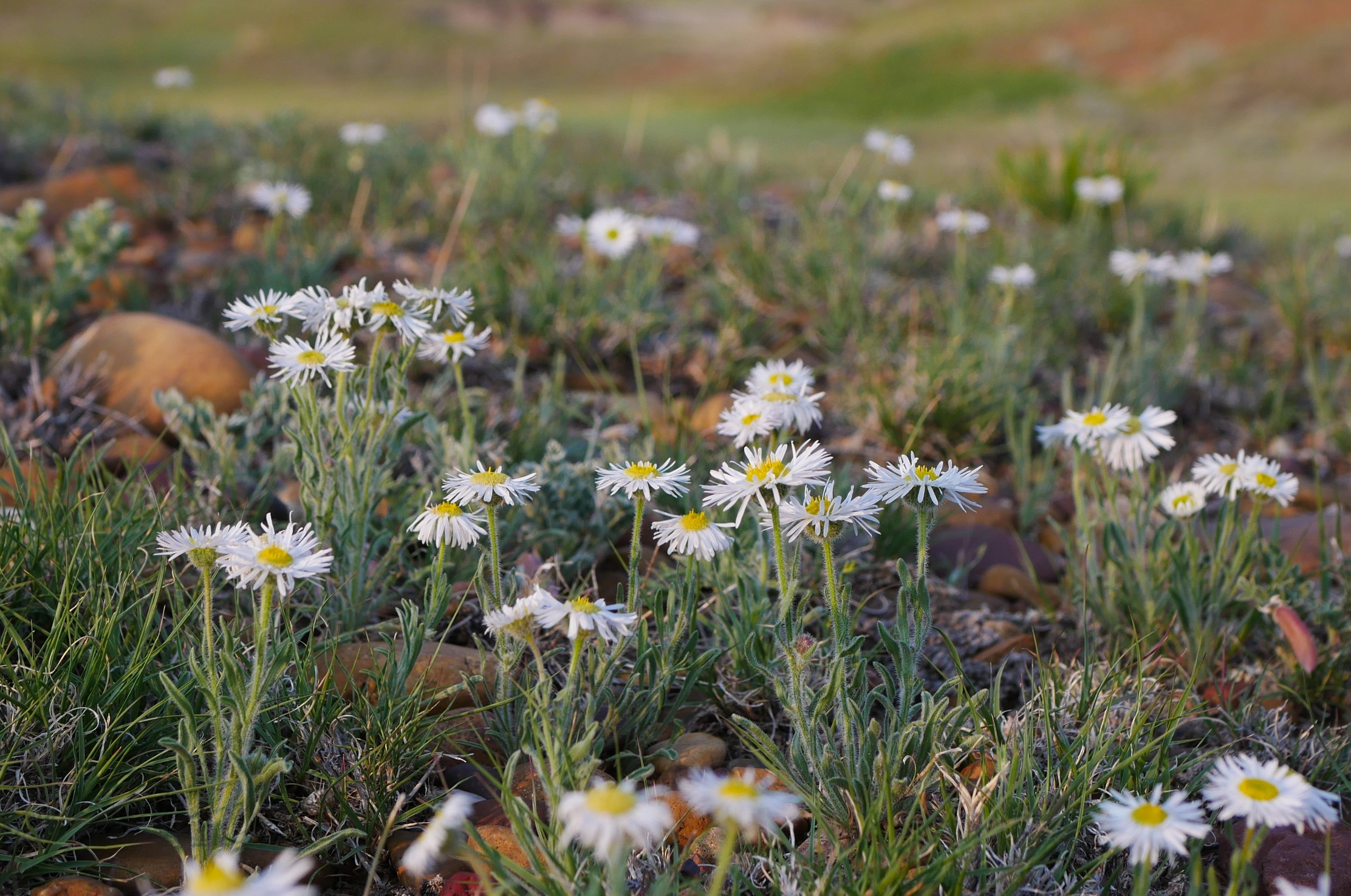
Erigeron pumilus ssp. pumilus in Roosevelt County, NE Montana

- Rays usually pink: Erigeron pumilus var. intermedius (Cronquist) Cronquist - Found in British Columbia, California, Idaho, Montana, Nevada, Oregon, Utah, Washington, Wyoming
- Rays usually white: Erigeron pumilus var. pumilus - Found in Alberta, Saskatchewan, Colorado, Kansas, Montana, Nebraska, the Dakotas, Washington, Wyoming
