= Erigeron lackschewitzii =

Scientific classification
- Kingdom: Plantae
- Clade: Tracheophytes
- Clade: Angiosperms
- Clade: Eudicots
- Clade: Asterids
- Order: Asterales
- Family: Asteraceae
- Genus: Erigeron
- Species: E. lackschewitzii

Binomial name
- Erigeron lackschewitzii G.L.Nesom & W.A.Weber

Species of flowering plant

Erigeron lackschewitzii is a rare species of flowering plant in the family Asteraceae known by the common name Lackschewitz's fleabane. It is native to the Rocky Mountains in the Canadian province of Alberta and the US state of Montana.

Erigeron lackschewitzii is a small perennial herb rarely more than 8 centimeters (0.8 inches) tall, producing a woody taproot. The leaves are mostly crowded around the base of the stem. The plant generally produces only one flower head per stem, each head with up to 68 purple or lavender ray florets each measuring 8-11 millimeters (0.3-0.4 inches) long. These surround numerous yellow disc florets in the center.

The species is named for plant collector Klaus Heinrich Lackschewitz.
