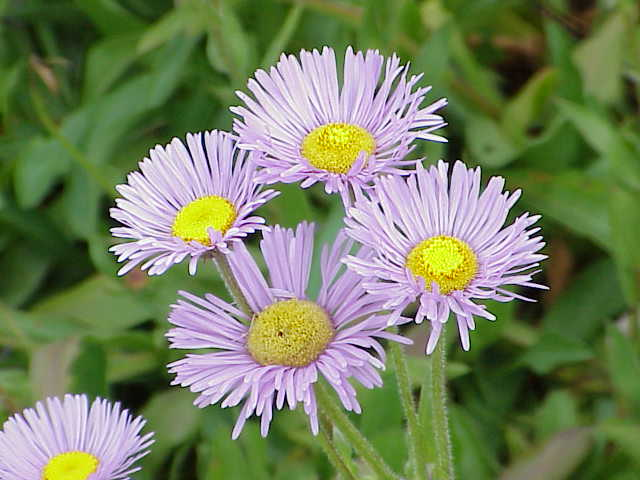

Conservation status
- Secure (NatureServe)

Scientific classification
- Kingdom: Plantae
- Clade: Tracheophytes
- Clade: Angiosperms
- Clade: Eudicots
- Clade: Asterids
- Order: Asterales
- Family: Asteraceae
- Genus: Erigeron
- Species: E. glabellus

Binomial name
- Erigeron glabellus Nutt.

Synonyms
- Synonymy: Erigeron anicularum Greene; Erigeron asper Nutt.; Erigeron asperum Nutt.; Erigeron oblanceolatus Rydb.; Erigeron subcostatus Lunell; Erigeron tardus Lunell; Fragmosa aspera (Nutt.) Raf. ex B.D.Jacks.; Fragmosa glabella (Nutt.) Raf. ex B.D.Jacks.; Erigeron anodontus Lunell, syn of var. pubescens; Erigeron oligodontus Lunell, syn of var. pubescens; Erigeron glabellum Nutt.; Tessenia glabella (Nutt.) Lunell

= Erigeron glabellus =

North American species of flowering daisy

Erigeron glabellus is a North American species of flowering plants in the family Asteraceae, called the streamside fleabane.

Erigeron glabellus is widespread across much of the colder parts of western North America. In Canada, it has been found in Yukon, Northwest Territories, British Columbia, all three Prairie Provinces, and Ontario. In the United States, it grows in Alaska, the northern part of the contiguous United States from Washington to Wisconsin, and in the Rocky Mountains as far south as Arizona and New Mexico.

Erigeron glabellus is distinguished from related species by its extremely narrow ray florets, sometimes reduced to thread-like strands. The plant is a perennial herb up to 70 centimeters (28 inches) in height. It sometimes produces only one flower head per stem, sometimes a group of up to 10. Each head has as many as 175 white, pink, or blue ray florets surrounding numerous yellow disc florets.

Varieties

- Erigeron glabellus var. glabellus - Alberta, Manitoba Saskatchewan; Colorado, Idaho, Montana, New Mexico, Arizona, North Dakota, South Dakota, Utah, Wyoming
- Erigeron glabellus var. pubescens Hooker - Alberta, British Columbia, Manitoba, Northwest Territories, Ontario, Saskatchewan, Yukon; Alaska, Colorado, Idaho, Minnesota, Montana, North Dakota, South Dakota, Wisconsin, Wyoming
