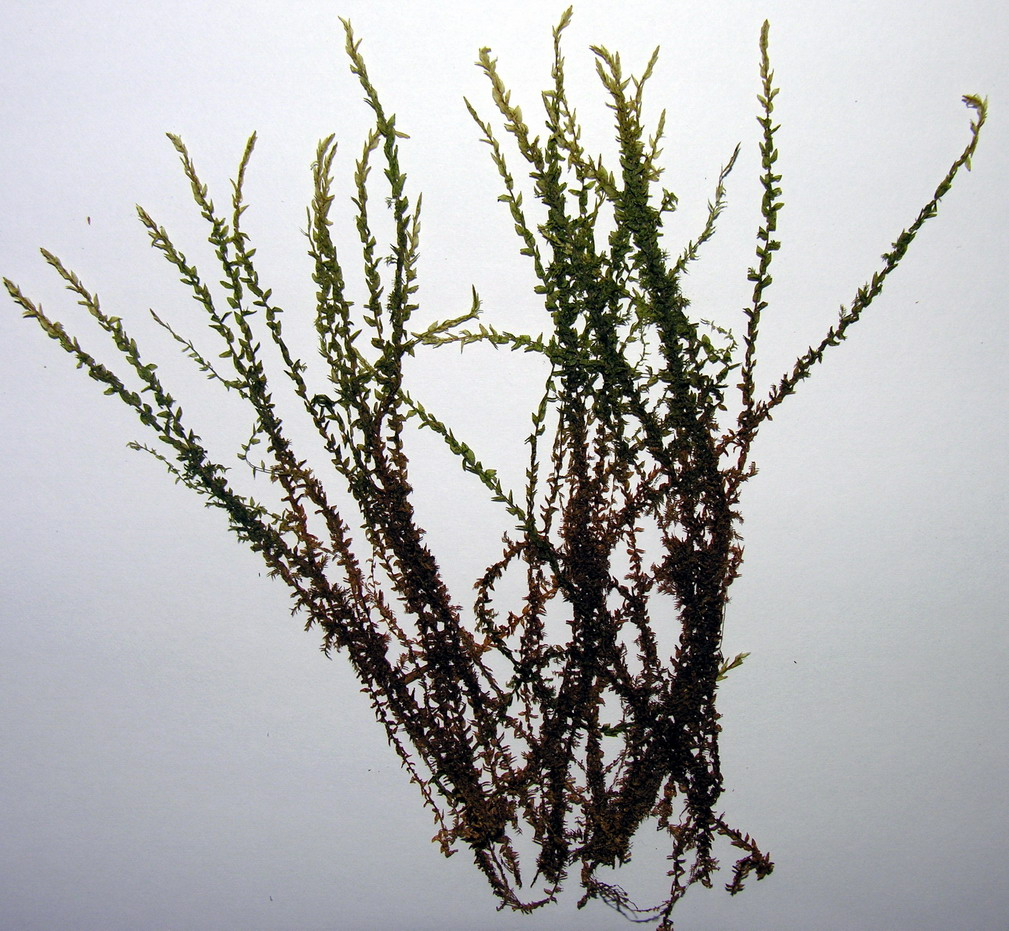

Scientific classification
- Kingdom: Plantae
- Division: Bryophyta
- Class: Bryopsida
- Subclass: Bryidae
- Order: Hypnales
- Family: Calliergonaceae
- Genus: Calliergon
- Species: C. cordifolium

Binomial name
- Calliergon cordifolium (Hedw.) Kindb.

= Calliergon cordifolium =

Species of moss

Calliergon cordifolium is a species of moss in the Calliergonaceae family, commonly known as the calliergon moss (though this name refers to the genus Calliergon generally) or heart-leaved spearmoss. The species is abundant in the right habitat, and grows in marshes and wet woodland, especially woodland of alder (Alnus) or willow (Salix), as well as around streams, ditches and pools. The species grows in tufts among other moss species. Calliergon cordifolium requires a wet environment to grow, and often grows completely submerged in water. It typically prefers lowland, but has been recorded as high as 910 metres (1,000 yd) above sea level in Inverness, Scotland. The species has a circumpolar Boreo-temperate distribution. It is found throughout Europe (including north, into the Arctic Circle - Svalbard, the Faeroe Islands, Iceland and Greenland - and east into the Caucasus). It has been recorded in north and central Asia, as well as Turkey and Japan, throughout North America and in New Zealand.

Calliergon cordifolium is a medium-sized to large moss with erect, green shoots. The shoots can reach up to 15 centimetres (5.9 in), with egg-shaped leaves from 2 to 2.5 millimetres (0.079 to 0.098 in) wide. The leaves extend outwards, away from the stem. Towards the base, the leaves take on a heart shape, while, at the tip, they are rounded. The spore-bearing capsules are rarely seen, and are encountered only in spring or summer. The spores measure 10 to 16 micrometres across. Calliergon cordifolium can be mistaken for similar species, including Calliergon giganteum, Calliergonella cuspidata, Straminergon stramineum and Pseudocalliergon trifarium.
