= Calliergon richardsonii =

Scientific classification
- Kingdom: Plantae
- Division: Bryophyta
- Class: Bryopsida
- Subclass: Bryidae
- Order: Hypnales
- Family: Calliergonaceae
- Genus: Calliergon
- Species: C. richardsonii

Binomial name
- Calliergon richardsonii Kindberg, 1897

Species of moss

Calliergon richardsonii, Richardson's calliergon moss, is a species of moss belonging to the family Amblystegiaceae.

It has almost cosmopolitan distribution.
