= Amblystegium fluviatile =

Scientific classification
- Kingdom: Plantae
- Division: Bryophyta
- Class: Bryopsida
- Subclass: Bryidae
- Order: Hypnales
- Family: Amblystegiaceae
- Genus: Amblystegium
- Species: A. fluviatile

Binomial name
- Amblystegium fluviatile (Hedw.) Schimp.

Species of moss

Amblystegium fluviatile is a species of moss belonging to the family Amblystegiaceae.

It is native to Europe and Northern America.
