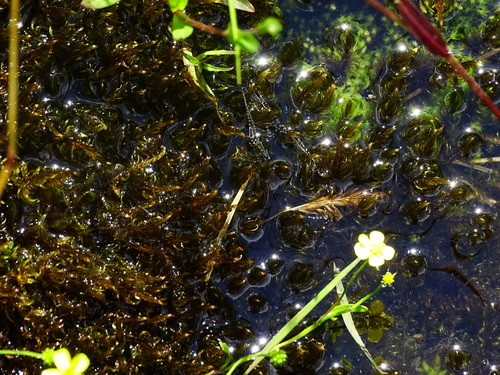
- Sarmentypnum exannulatum in Salzburg, Austria.

Scientific classification
- Kingdom: Plantae
- Division: Bryophyta
- Class: Bryopsida
- Subclass: Bryidae
- Order: Hypnales
- Family: Calliergonaceae
- Genus: Sarmentypnum
- Species: S. exannulatum

Binomial name
- Sarmentypnum exannulatum (Schimp.) Hedenäs

Synonyms
- Drepanocladus exannulatus; Warnstorfia exannulata

= Sarmentypnum exannulatum =

Species of moss

Sarmentypnum exannulatum, also known as ringless hook-moss, is a species of medium-sized wetland moss belonging to the family Amblystegiaceae. It was first described by Wilhelm Philipp Schimper in collaboration with his brother Wilhelm Philippe Schimper in 1854.

== Description ==
Sarmentypnum exannulatum is characterized by its medium-sized stature, ranging from green to yellowish, and occasionally exhibiting a reddish secondary pigment. The stems of the plant have apices with branches and shoots. The epidermal cells of the stems typically widen, forming a partial hyalodermis. The axillary hairs have 1-4 distal cells, which are hyaline when young.

The stem leaves of S. exannulatum are ovate or ovate-triangular in shape, gradually narrowing to the apex. They are often falcate but may also be straight. The leaves are concave and not decurrent at the base. The margins of the leaves are distinctly denticulate either proximally, distally, or both. The apex of the leaves is acuminate. The costa terminates at approximately 3/5 to nearly the entire length of the leaf. The alar region extends from the margins to the costa or nearly so. The shoots of S. exannulatum can reach a length of 20–30 cm, with leaves measuring 2.5–4 mm in length.

== Distribution ==
Sarmentypnum exannulatum can be found in North America, South America, Eurasia, Africa, Pacific Islands, and Australia. It can be observed in intermediately mineral-rich fens, around springs, late snow beds, and even submerged in lakes. This species is known to occur in a range of elevations, from low to high, spanning from sea level up to 4200 meters.
