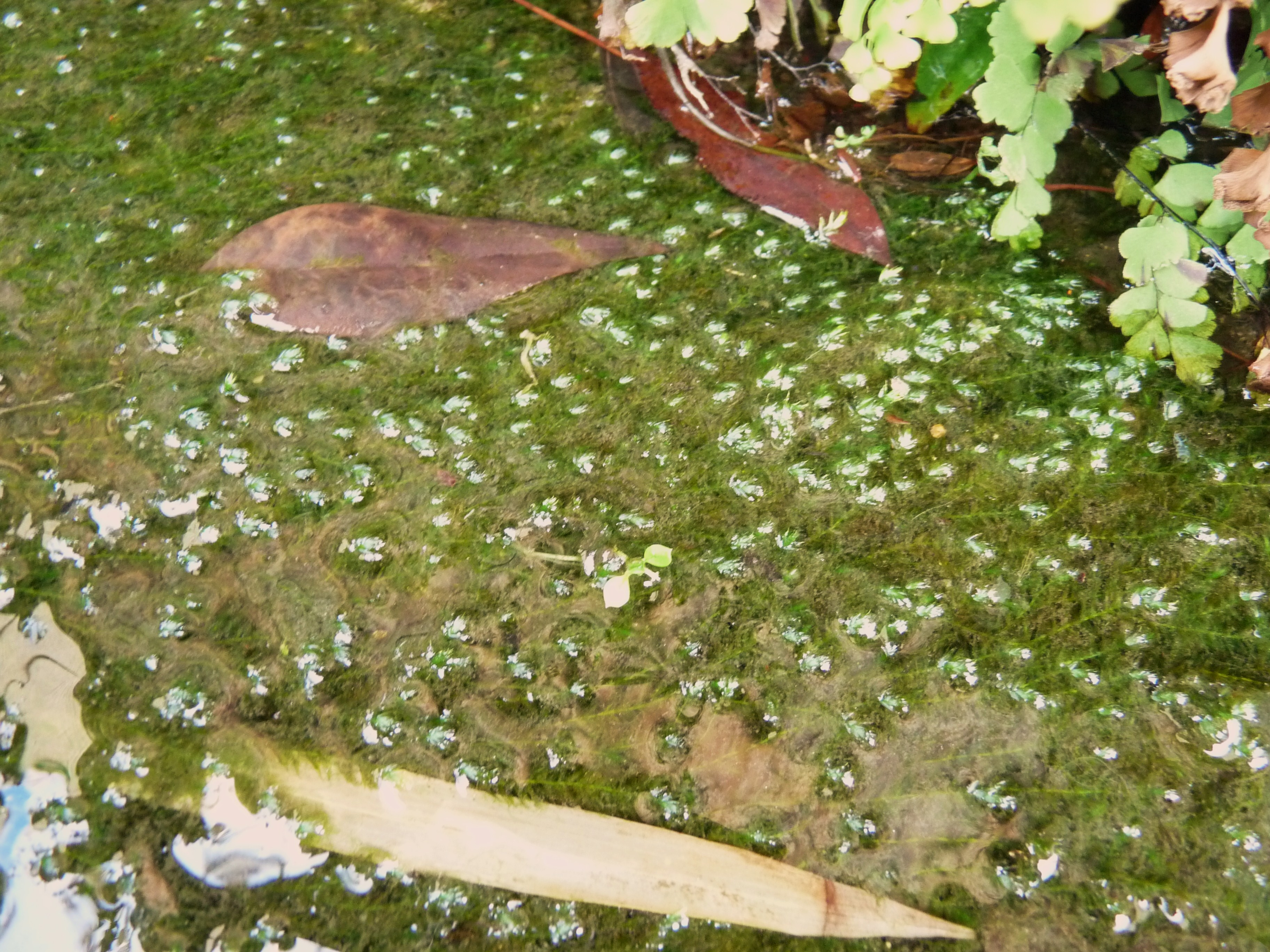

Scientific classification
- Kingdom: Plantae
- Clade: Embryophytes
- Division: Bryophyta
- Class: Bryopsida
- Subclass: Bryidae
- Order: Hypnales
- Family: Amblystegiaceae
- Genus: Leptodictyum
- Species: L. riparium

Binomial name
- Leptodictyum riparium (Hedw.) Warnst.

Synonyms
- Amblystegium riparium

= Leptodictyum riparium =

Species of moss

Leptodictyum riparium, commonly known as Kneiff's feathermoss, streamside leptodictyum moss,, stringy moss,, or knapwort, is a species of moss of cosmopolitan distribution. The only places it is not found are the Pacific Islands and Australia. It is commonly found growing in the lakes and rivers of Minnesota and is also present in Mexico, Guatemala, the Bahamas, Cuba, Jamaica, Haiti, the Dominican Republic, Venezuela, Peru and Brazil.

This moss has several different forms and can grow up to 30 cm. Its ovate leaves, which are in two rows, are often pointed at their apex. Leptodictyum riparium has been found in an acidic mining lake and can live at a pH down to 1.6 in volcanic craters. It was once found with Eleocharis acicularis at a Canadian mining lake. It is known to contain high levels of phosphate. It has been reported that L. riparium tolerates a wide range of nutrient conditions and its population increases as ammonia increases.

Leptodictyum riparium is known to be able to use artificial light to grow in places which are otherwise devoid of natural light, such as Crystal Cave in Wisconsin.

It is an easy to grow moss that is also used in aquariums. In the aquarium trade it is one of at least two species traded under the common name "Stringy Moss", another being Drepanocladus aduncus.
