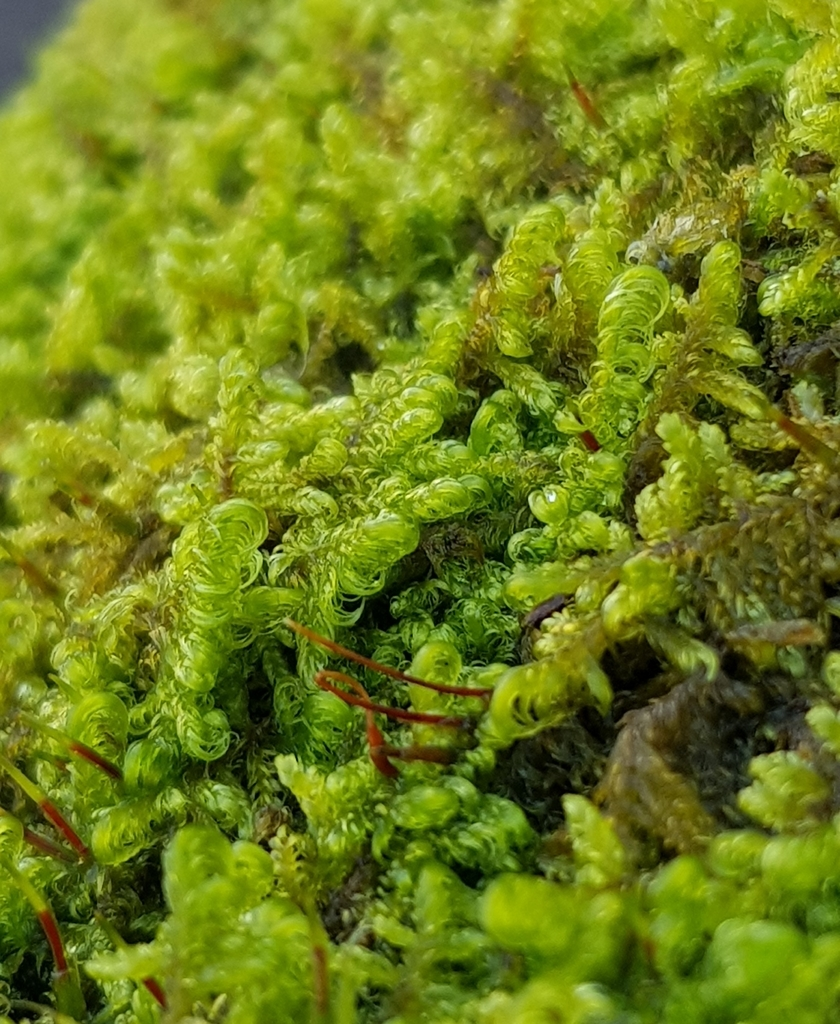

Scientific classification
- Kingdom: Plantae
- Division: Bryophyta
- Class: Bryopsida
- Subclass: Bryidae
- Order: Hypnales
- Family: Amblystegiaceae
- Genus: Sanionia; Loeske

= Sanionia =

Genus of mosses

Sanionia is a genus of mosses belonging to the family Scorpidiaceae.

The genus has cosmopolitan distribution, and was circumscribed by Leopold Loeske in Verh. Bot. Vereins. Prov. Brandenburg vol.49 on page 63 in 1907.

The genus is named after Karl Gustav Sanio (1832–1891).

== Species ==
- Sanionia georgicouncinata Ochyra, 1998
- Sanionia nivalis Hedenäs
- Sanionia orthothecioides (Lindb.) Loeske
- Sanionia symmetrica (Renauld & Cardot) Wheldon
- Sanionia uncinata Loeske, 1907
