= Carl Friedrich Warnstorf =

German bryologist (1837–1921)

- Born: 2 December 1837; Sommerfeld, Kingdom of Prussia
- Died: 28 February 1921 (aged 83); Berlin-Friedenau, Germany
- Scientific career
- Fields: Bryology
- Author abbrev. (botany): Warnst.

Carl Friedrich Warnstorf (2 December 1837 – 28 February 1921) was a German educator and bryologist specializing in Sphagnum studies.

He received his education at the teaching seminar in Neuzelle (1855–1858), afterwards worked as a school teacher in Arnswalde (1859 to 1867), and Neuruppin (1867 to 1899). During this time he published three bryophyte exsiccatae and from 1896 to 1910 with Max Fleischer the forth series named Bryotheca Europaea Meridionalis. Following retirement from teaching he settled in Berlin. In 1917, he was awarded with the title of professor. During World War II his herbarium of 30,000 items was destroyed in the midst of the bombing of Berlin (1943).

The genus Warnstorfia was named in his honor by bryologist Leopold Loeske (1865–1935).

== Published works ==
He was editor of the section on Sphagnales-Sphagnaceae in Adolf Engler's Das Pflanzenreich. The following are some of Warnstorf's main works:

- Die Europäischen Torfmoose, Berlin. 152 S. (1881) - European sphagnum.
- Zur Bryo-Geographie des Russischen Reiches (1913-14) - Bryo-geography of the Russian Reich.
- Bryophyta (Sphagnales-Bryales-Hepaticae) — In: Adolf Pascher's "Die Süsswasser-Flora Deutschlands, Österreichs und der Schweiz". 14: 222 S. (with Wilhelm Mönkemeyer and Victor Félix Schiffner), 1914 - Bryophyta (Sphagnales-Bryales-Hepaticae).
- Pottia-Studien als Vorarbeiten zu einer Monographie des Genus "Pottia Ehrh." sens. str. — Hedwigia 58: 35–152. (1916) - Studies of the genus Pottia.
