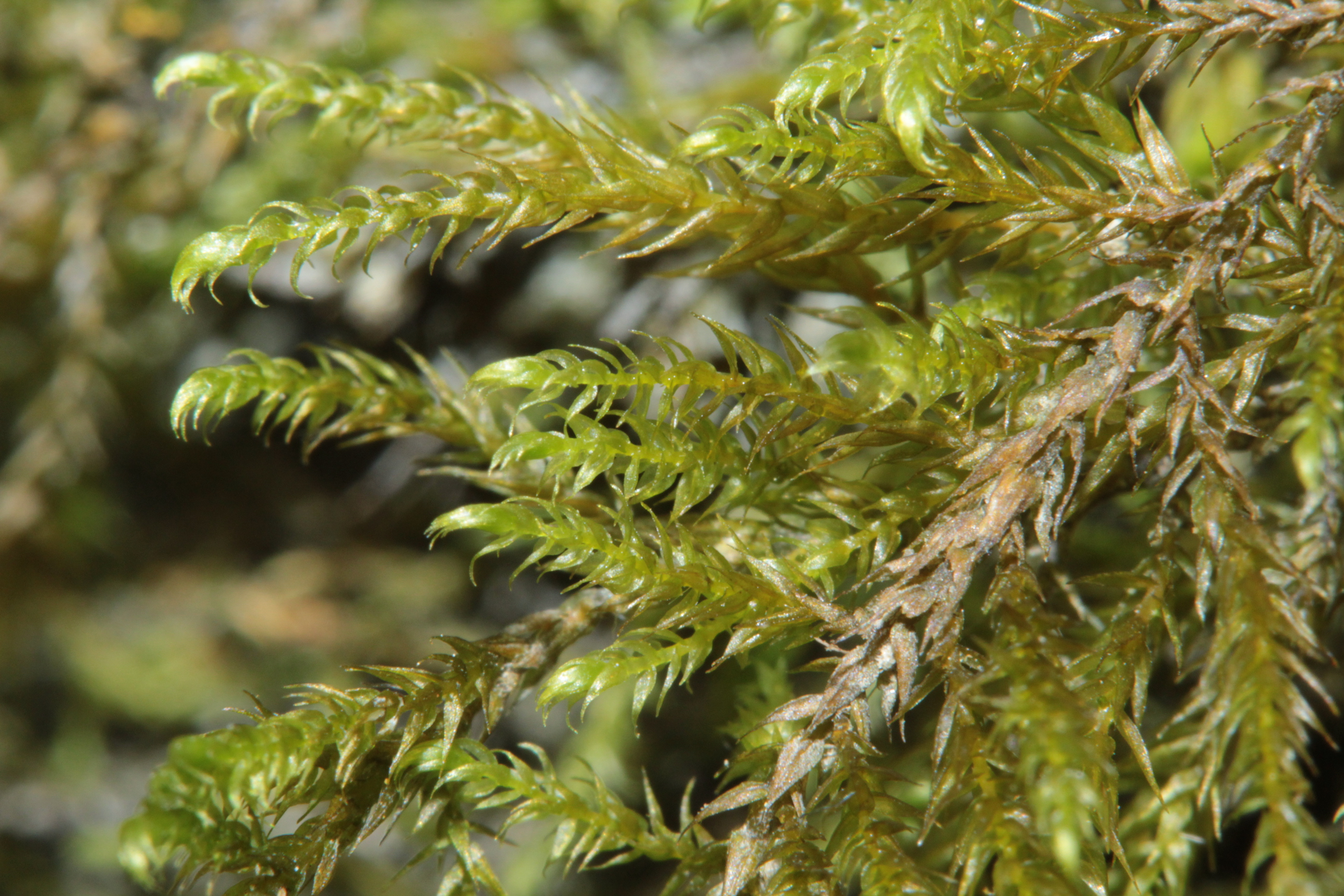

Scientific classification
- Kingdom: Plantae
- Division: Bryophyta
- Class: Bryopsida
- Subclass: Bryidae
- Order: Hypnales
- Family: Amblystegiaceae
- Genus: Hygroamblystegium
- Species: H. tenax

Binomial name
- Hygroamblystegium tenax Jennings, 1913

= Hygroamblystegium tenax =

Species of moss

Hygroamblystegium tenax is a species of moss belonging to the family Amblystegiaceae.

It has cosmopolitan distribution.
