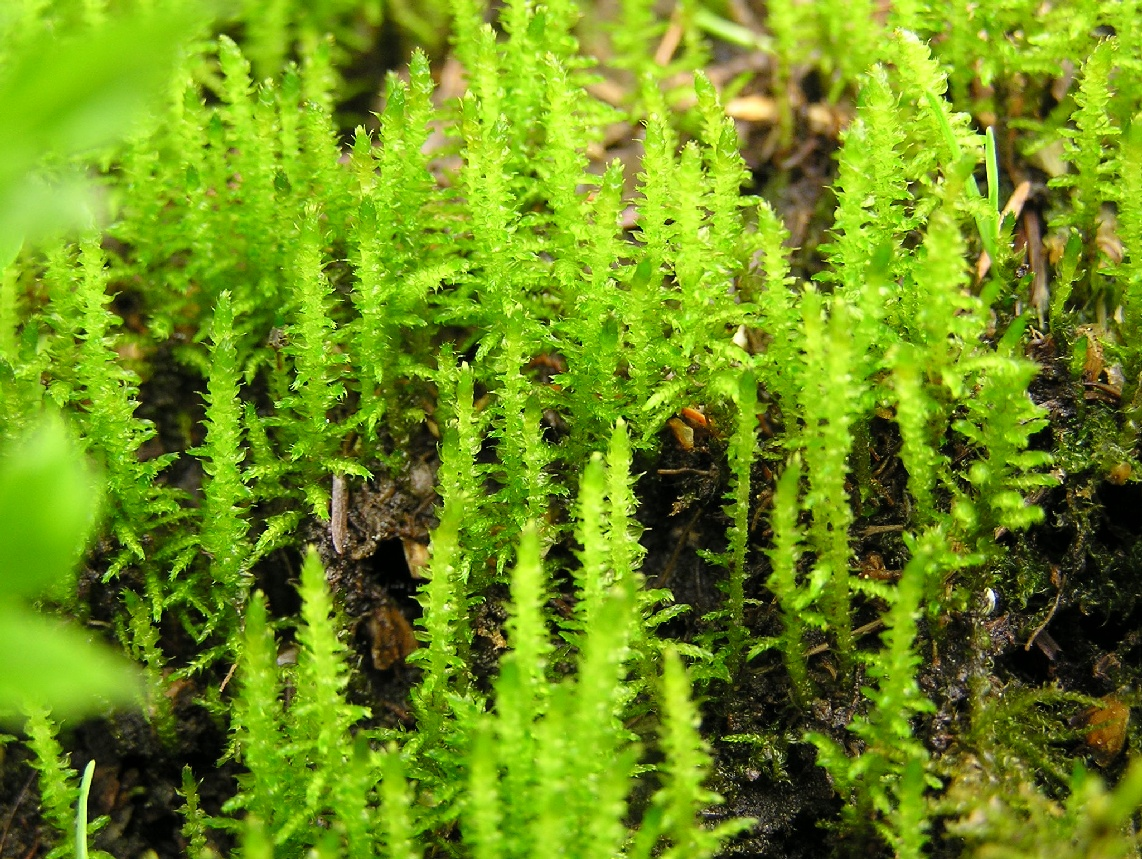
- Palustriella commutata in the Styrian-Lower Austrian Limestone Alps

Scientific classification
- Kingdom: Plantae
- Division: Bryophyta
- Class: Bryopsida
- Subclass: Bryidae
- Order: Hypnales
- Family: Amblystegiaceae
- Genus: Palustriella
- Species: P. commutata

Binomial name
- Palustriella commutata (Hedw.) Ochyra

Synonyms
- Cratoneuron commutatum Cratoneuron falcatum Hypnum commutatum Hypnum falcatum

= Palustriella commutata =

Species of moss

Palustriella commutata, commonly known as curled hookmoss, is a plant that also goes by the binomial names Cratoneuron commutatum, Cratoneuron falcatum, Hypnum commutatum, and Hypnum falcatum.

== Bibliography ==
- Hong Qian; Karel Klinka (1998). Plants of British Columbia: Scientific and Common Names of Vascular Plants, Bryophytes, and Lichens. University of British Columbia Press. ISBN 0774806524.
