= Gradsteinia torrenticola =

Conservation status
- Vulnerable (IUCN 2.3)

Scientific classification
- Kingdom: Plantae
- Division: Bryophyta
- Class: Bryopsida
- Subclass: Bryidae
- Order: Hypnales
- Family: Amblystegiaceae
- Genus: Gradsteinia
- Species: G. torrenticola

Binomial name
- Gradsteinia torrenticola Ochyra, C.Schmidt & Bültmann

Species of moss

Gradsteinia torrenticola is a species of moss in the family Amblystegiaceae. It is endemic to Spain. Its natural habitat is rivers.
