= Amblystegium tenax =

Scientific classification
- Kingdom: Plantae
- Division: Bryophyta
- Class: Bryopsida
- Subclass: Bryidae
- Order: Hypnales
- Family: Amblystegiaceae
- Genus: Amblystegium
- Species: A. tenax

Binomial name
- Amblystegium tenax (Hedw.) C.E.O.Jensen

Species of moss

Amblystegium tenax is a species of moss belonging to the family Amblystegiaceae.

It is native to Europe and Northern America.
