= Limbella fryei =

Conservation status
- Critically Endangered (IUCN 2.3)

Scientific classification
- Kingdom: Plantae
- Clade: Embryophytes
- Division: Bryophyta
- Class: Bryopsida
- Subclass: Bryidae
- Order: Hypnales
- Family: Amblystegiaceae
- Genus: Limbella
- Species: L. fryei

Binomial name
- Limbella fryei (R.S. Williams) Ochyra

Species of moss

Limbella fryei, or Frye's limbella moss, is a species of moss in the family Amblystegiaceae. It is endemic to the United States. It is believed to occur in Oregon. As the species is threatened by habitat loss while only occurring in a very restricted area (less than 10 km^{2}), it has been classified as critically endangered by the IUCN.
