= Arctic moss =

Arctic moss is a common name for several plants and may refer to:

- Calliergon giganteum, an aquatic moss
- Cladonia, a genus of lichens
