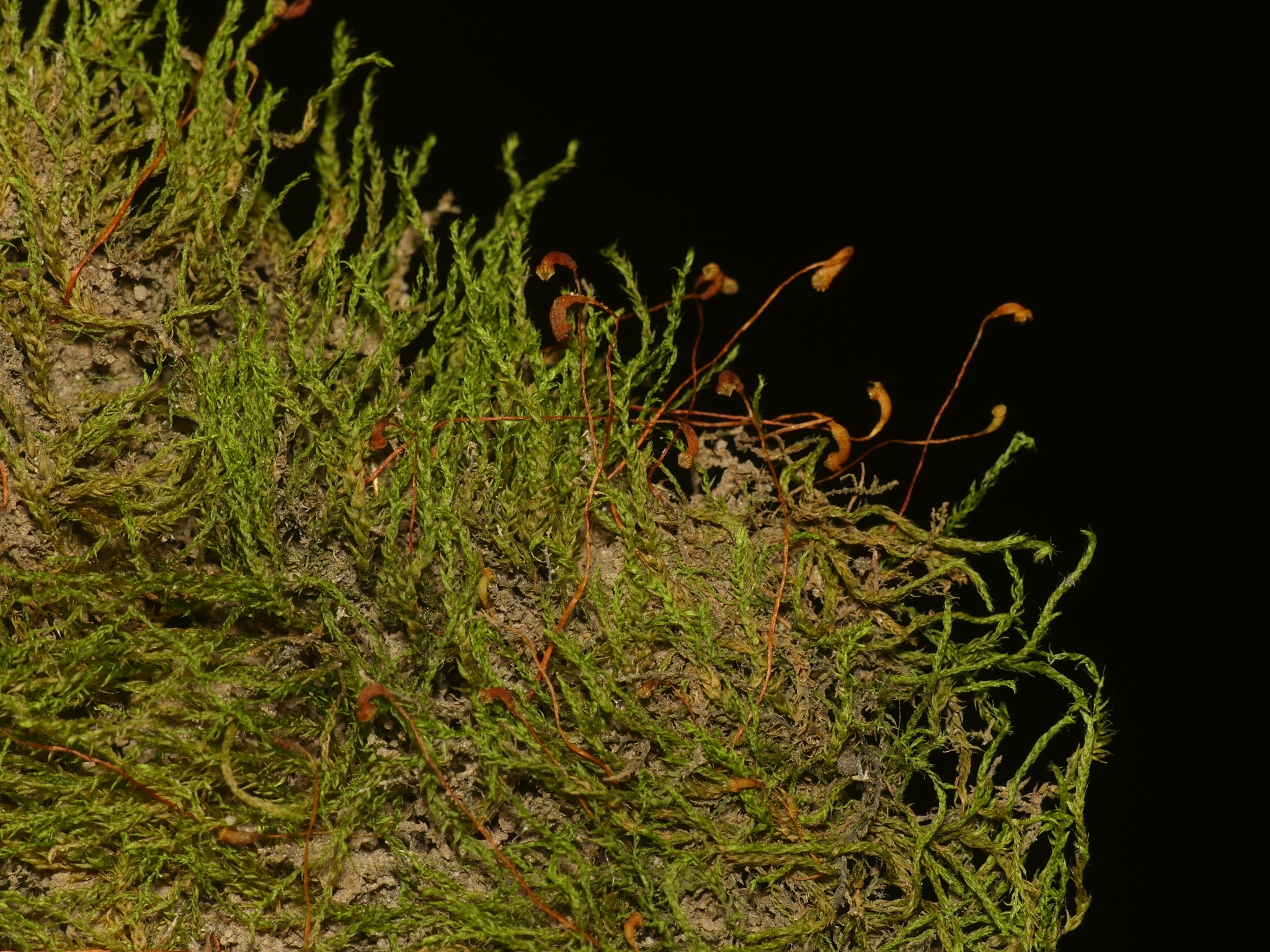

Conservation status
- Least Concern (IUCN 3.1)

Scientific classification
- Kingdom: Plantae
- Division: Bryophyta
- Class: Bryopsida
- Subclass: Bryidae
- Order: Hypnales
- Family: Amblystegiaceae
- Genus: Hygroamblystegium
- Species: H. varium

Binomial name
- Hygroamblystegium varium (Hedw.) Mönk.

Synonyms
- Amblystegium oligorrhizon Schimp.; Amblystegium pulchellum Müll.Hal.; Amblystegium radicale var. oligorrhizon (Schimp.) Lorentz; Amblystegium serpens f. noterophilum (Sull. & Lesq. ex Sull.) Austin; Amblystegium sparsifolium (Hampe) A.Jaeger; Amblystegium varium (Hedw.) Lindb.; Amblystegium varium var. arsenei Thér.; Amblystegium varium var. oligorrhizon (Schimp.) Lindb.; Amblystegium varium var. parvulum (Austin) Grout; Amblystegium varium var. varium; Hygroamblystegium varium (Hedw.) Lindb.; Hypnum debile Brid.; Hypnum diffusum Brid.; Hypnum madeirense Mitt.; Hypnum noterophilum Sull. & Lesq. ex Sull.; Hypnum pachypoma Schwägr.; Hypnum sparsifolium Hampe; Hypnum varium Hedw.) P.Beauv.; Leskea varia Hedw.; Stereodon varium (Hedw.) Mitt.

= Hygroamblystegium varium =

Species of moss

Hygroamblystegium varium is a species of moss in the Amblystegiaceae family. It has a cosmopolitan distribution.

Hygroamblystegium varium is known to be able to use artificial light to grow in places which are otherwise devoid of natural light, such as Niagara Cave.
