= Sciaromiopsis sinensis =

Conservation status
- Endangered (IUCN 2.3)

Scientific classification
- Kingdom: Plantae
- Division: Bryophyta
- Class: Bryopsida
- Subclass: Bryidae
- Order: Hypnales
- Family: Amblystegiaceae
- Genus: Sciaromiopsis
- Species: S. sinensis

Binomial name
- Sciaromiopsis sinensis (Broth.) Broth.

Species of moss

Sciaromiopsis sinensis is a species of moss in the family Amblystegiaceae. It is endemic to China, where it is known from only three locations.

This is an aquatic moss that only grows in clear rivers and streams. It has not been seen since the first specimens were collected 100 years ago, and its known habitat is now polluted and heavy with silt, so it is possible that it has become extinct.

This moss forms glossy brown mats with branching stems up to 12 centimeters long.
