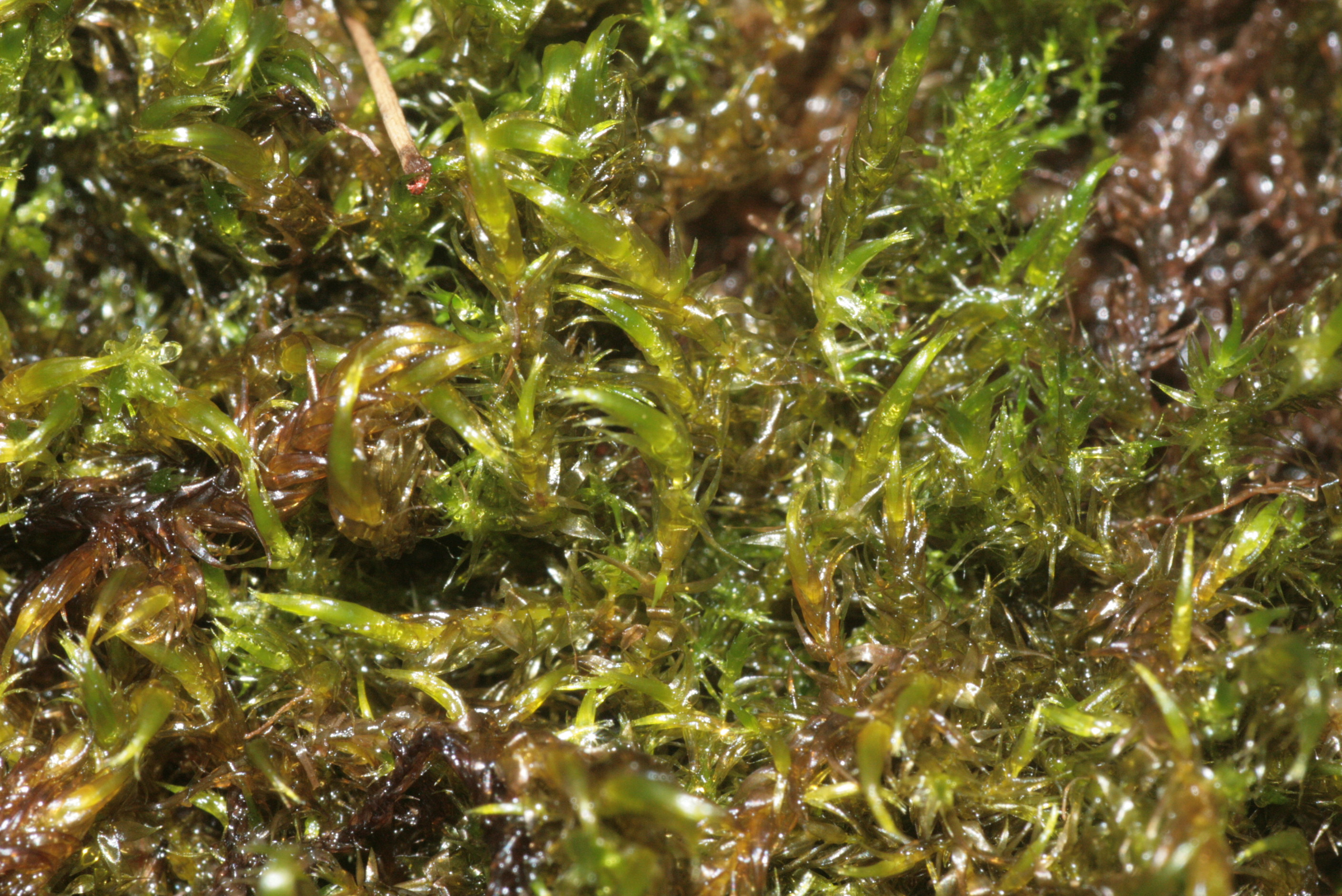
- Warnstorfia fluitans

Scientific classification
- Kingdom: Plantae
- Division: Bryophyta
- Class: Bryopsida
- Subclass: Bryidae
- Order: Hypnales
- Family: Amblystegiaceae
- Genus: Warnstorfia
- Species: W. fluitans

Binomial name
- Warnstorfia fluitans (Hedwig) Loeske

= Warnstorfia fluitans =

Species of plant

Warnstorfia fluitans, the floating hook-moss or water hook-moss, is a species of moss found in acidic habitats across all continents except Antarctica.

== Description ==
Warnstorfia fluitans is a medium-sized moss ranging in color from green to yellowish to brownish and can be rarely red when the species occurs in exposed habitats. The cells of its stem epidermis are not widened, and its pseudoparaphyllia are ovate-triangular to lanceolate in shape. It has axillary hairs with a distal portion of one to four cells, the hairs being hyaline when young. Its stem leaves are narrowly ovate to triangularly ovate, with denticulate margins. Their apices are acuminate, and the costa range from 50 to 80% of the leaf length. Its alar regions are narrowly transversely triangular and roughly reach the costa. The moss is sexually autoicous.

Warnstorfia fluitans is distinguished from Warnstorfia pseudostraminea, the other autoicous species in its genus, by its more broadly triangular alar groups and more straight to slightly falcate stem leaves with hooked apices. However, these morphological features are inconsistent in W. pseudostraminea, and rarely certain occurrences of W. fluitans have the same characteristics.

Warnstorfia fluitans is excellent at phytofiltration of arsenic from water.

== Distribution and habitat ==
Warnstorfia fluitans commonly occurs in minerally poor or acidic habitats, though it can occasionally occur in nutrient rich areas. It is often found in fens, bogs, depressions in rocks, on moist rocky surfaces, and other similar watery areas ranging in elevation from 0–3,500 m (0–11,483 ft). It can grow among Sphagnum cuspidatum.

The moss can be found throughout Canada and the northern United States, variously in South America, Australia, and Eurasia, in southern and eastern Africa, and on islands in the Atlantic, Pacific, and Indian oceans.

Warnstorfia fluitans is known to be able to use artificial light to grow in places which are otherwise devoid of natural light, such as Crystal Cave in Wisconsin.

== Response to herbicide application ==
In a study of the effect of the herbicide Asulam on moss growth, Warnstorfia fluitans was shown to be tolerant to Asulam exposure.
