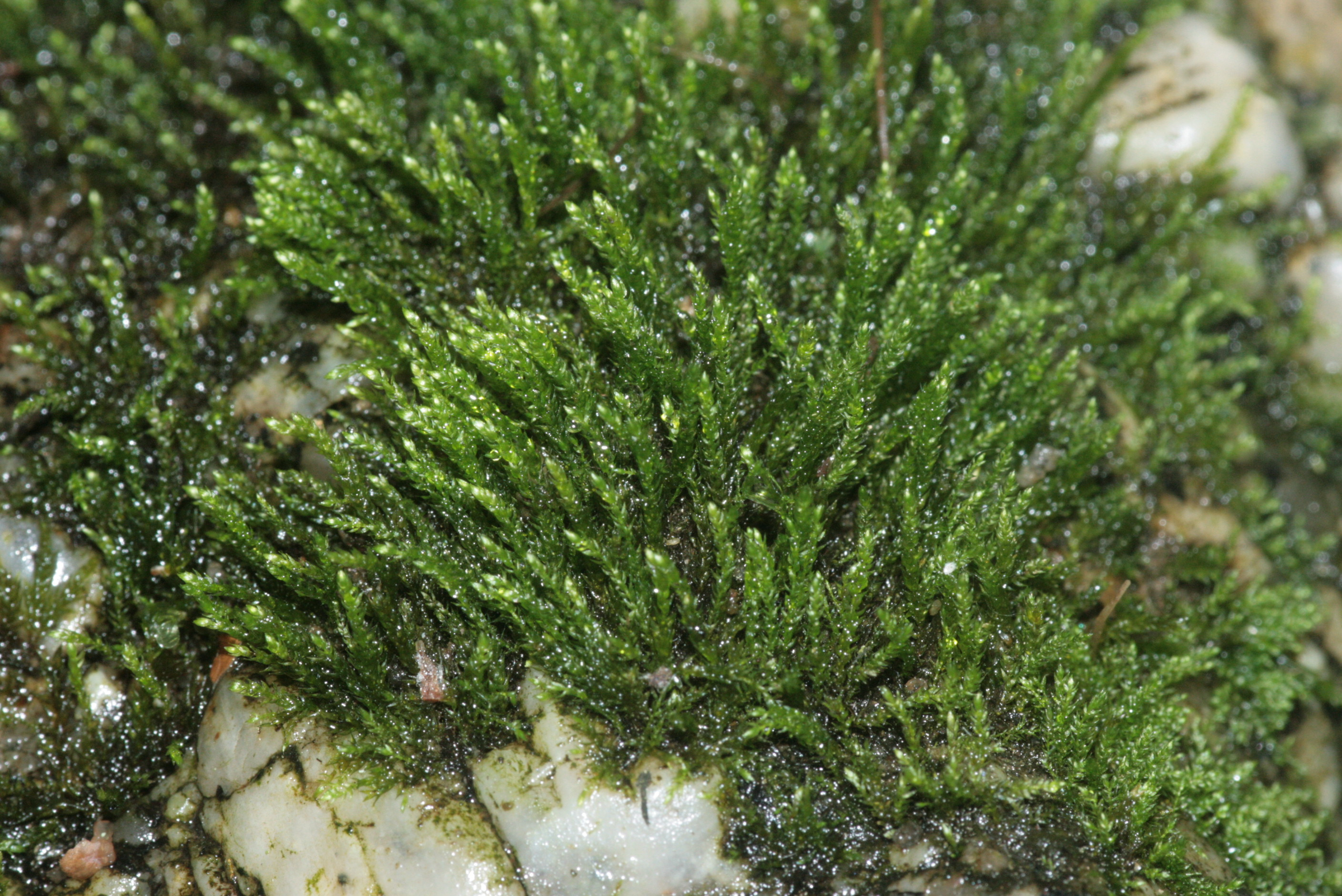
- Hygroamblystegium fluviatile

Scientific classification
- Kingdom: Plantae
- Division: Bryophyta
- Class: Bryopsida
- Subclass: Bryidae
- Order: Hypnales
- Family: Amblystegiaceae
- Genus: Hygroamblystegium; Loeske

= Hygroamblystegium =

Genus of mosses

Hygroamblystegium is a genus of mosses belonging to the family Amblystegiaceae.

The genus was first described by Loeske.

The genus has cosmopolitan distribution.

Species:

- Hygroamblystegium humile
- Hygroamblystegium tenax
- Hygroamblystegium varium
