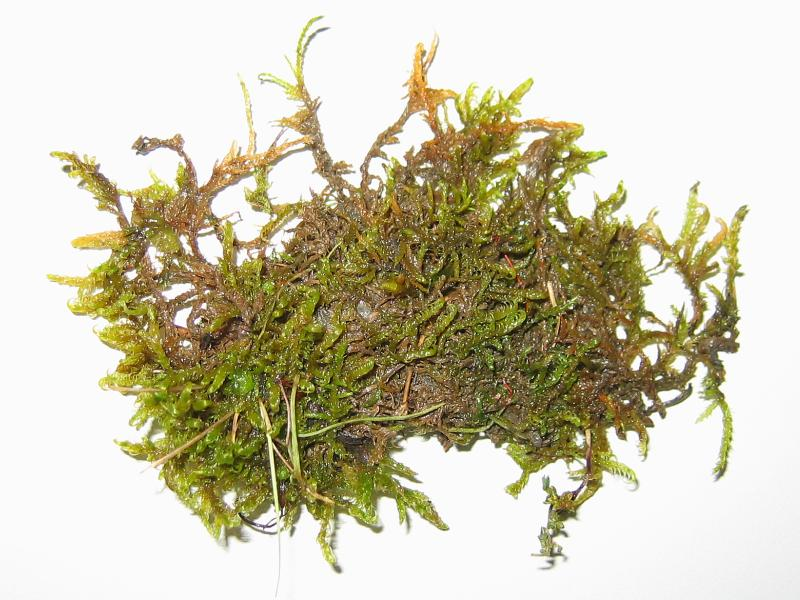

Scientific classification
- Kingdom: Plantae
- Division: Bryophyta
- Class: Bryopsida
- Subclass: Bryidae
- Order: Hypnales
- Family: Amblystegiaceae
- Genus: Pseudocalliergon
- Species: P. lycopodioides

Binomial name
- Pseudocalliergon lycopodioides (Brid.) Hedenäs

= Drepanocladus lycopodioides =

Species of moss

Pseudocalliergon lycopodioides is a species of moss belonging to the family Amblystegiaceae.

Synonym:

- Drepanocladus lycopodioides (Brid.) Warnst.
