= Pseudoamblystegium =

Scientific classification
- Kingdom: Plantae
- Division: Bryophyta
- Class: Bryopsida
- Subclass: Bryidae
- Order: Hypnales
- Family: Amblystegiaceae
- Genus: Pseudoamblystegium; Vanderp. & Hedenäs

Genus of mosses

Pseudoamblystegium is a genus of mosses belonging to the family Amblystegiaceae.

Species:

- Pseudoamblystegium subtile (Hedw.) Vanderp. & Hedenäs
