= Sciaromiopsis =

Scientific classification
- Kingdom: Plantae
- Division: Bryophyta
- Class: Bryopsida
- Subclass: Bryidae
- Order: Hypnales
- Family: Amblystegiaceae
- Genus: Sciaromiopsis; Broth.

Genus of mosses

Sciaromiopsis is a genus of mosses in the family Amblystegiaceae.

Species include:

- Sciaromiopsis brevifolia
- Sciaromiopsis nipponensis
- Sciaromiopsis sinensis (Broth.) Broth.
