= Loeskypnum =

Scientific classification
- Kingdom: Plantae
- Division: Bryophyta
- Class: Bryopsida
- Subclass: Bryidae
- Order: Hypnales
- Family: Calliergonaceae
- Genus: Loeskypnum; H.K.G.Paul

Genus of mosses

Loeskypnum is a genus of mosses belonging to the family Amblystegiaceae.

The species of this genus are found in Eurasia and Northern America.

The genus name of Loeskypnum is in honour of Leopold Loeske (1865–1935), who was a German watchmaker and amateur bryologist.

The genus was circumscribed by Hermann Karl Gustav Paul in Bryol. Z. vol.1 on page 155 in 1918.

Species:

- Loeskypnum badium Paul, 1916
- Loeskypnum wickesiae (Grout) Tuom.
- Loeskypnum wickesii Tuomikoski, 1973
