= Gradsteinia =

Scientific classification
- Kingdom: Plantae
- Division: Bryophyta
- Class: Bryopsida
- Subclass: Bryidae
- Order: Hypnales
- Family: Amblystegiaceae
- Genus: Gradsteinia; Ochyra

Genus of mosses

Gradsteinia is a genus of moss in family Amblystegiaceae.

The genus name of Gradsteinia is in honour of Stephan Robbert Gradstein (b.1943) a Dutch botanist (Bryology) and Professor of Botany at the University of Göttingen.

The genus was circumscribed by Ryszard Ochyra in Trop. Bryol. vol.3 on page 19 in 1990.

It contains the following species (but this list may be incomplete), Gradsteinia torrenticola, Ochyra, C.Schmidt & Bültmann
