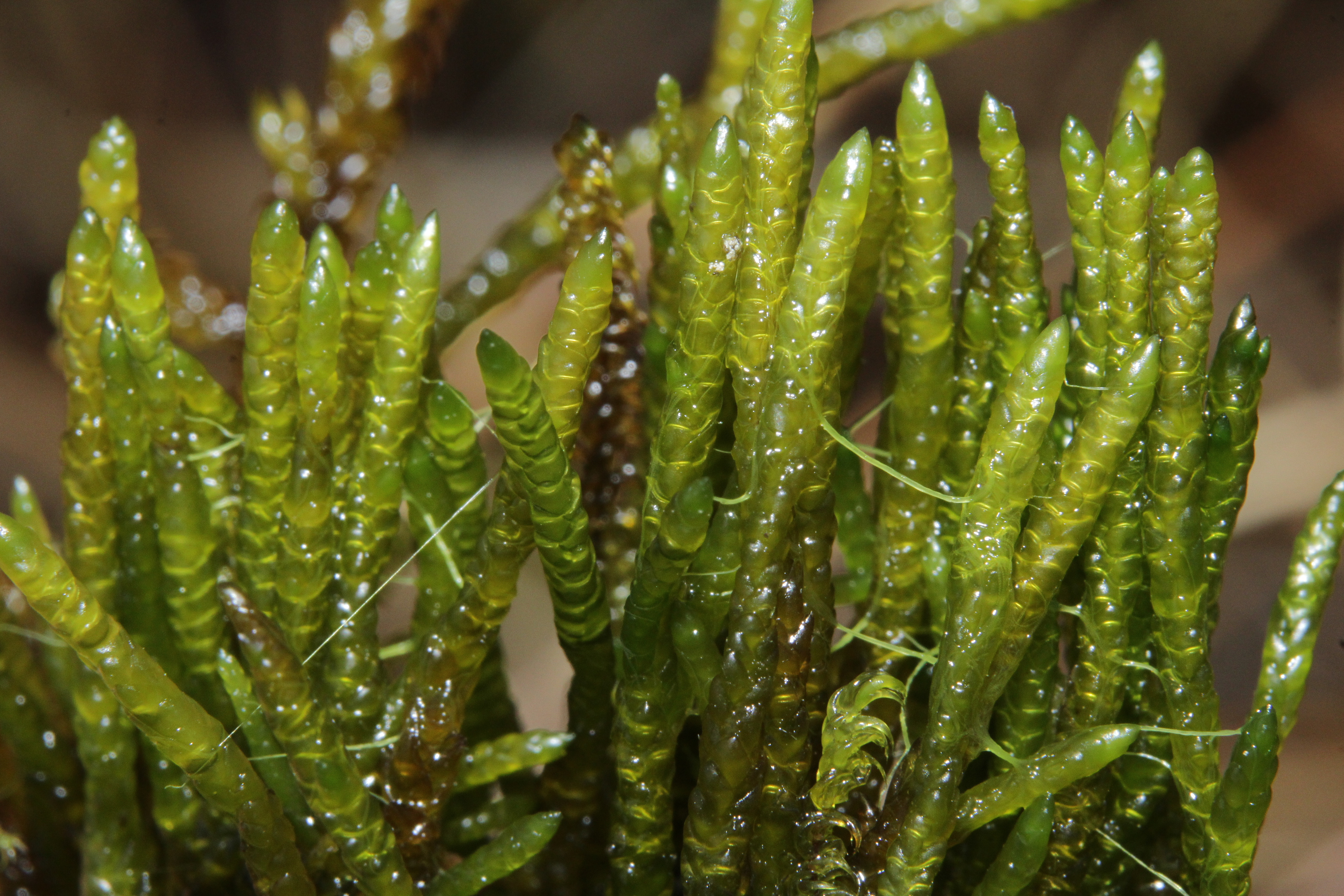

Scientific classification
- Kingdom: Plantae
- Division: Bryophyta
- Class: Bryopsida
- Subclass: Bryidae
- Order: Hypnales
- Family: Amblystegiaceae
- Genus: Pseudocalliergon (Limpr.) Loeske

= Pseudocalliergon =

Genus of mosses

Pseudocalliergon is a genus of mosses belonging to the family Amblystegiaceae.

The genus was first described by Karl Gustav Limpricht.

The genus has cosmopolitan distribution.

Species:

- Pseudocalliergon lycopodioides Hedenäs, 1990
