= Platydictya =

Scientific classification
- Kingdom: Plantae
- Division: Bryophyta
- Class: Bryopsida
- Subclass: Bryidae
- Order: Hypnales
- Family: Plagiotheciaceae
- Genus: Platydictya; Berk.

Genus of mosses

Platydictya is a genus of mosses belonging to the family Amblystegiaceae.

The species of this genus are found in Eurasia, Northern America, Antarctica.

Species:

- Platydictya acuminata (Lindb. & Arnell) Ignatov
- Platydictya baicalensis (Ignatov & Ochyra) Hedenäs & N.Pedersen
