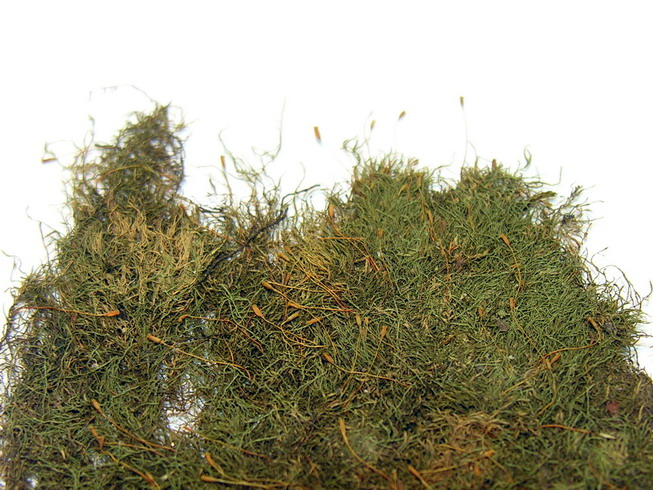

Scientific classification
- Kingdom: Plantae
- Division: Bryophyta
- Class: Bryopsida
- Subclass: Bryidae
- Order: Hypnales
- Family: Amblystegiaceae
- Genus: Amblystegium
- Species: A. serpens

Binomial name
- Amblystegium serpens Schimp.

= Amblystegium serpens =

Species of moss

Amblystegium serpens, also known as the creeping feathermoss or nano moss, is a species of moss. It is a common species in Britain.

The species is pleurocarpous in form, with ovate to lanceolate leaves which end in a fine acute point. It forms creeping mats on decaying tree stumps, hedgebanks and other shaded sites.

It can live under water, and is used as a plant in some home aquariums.
