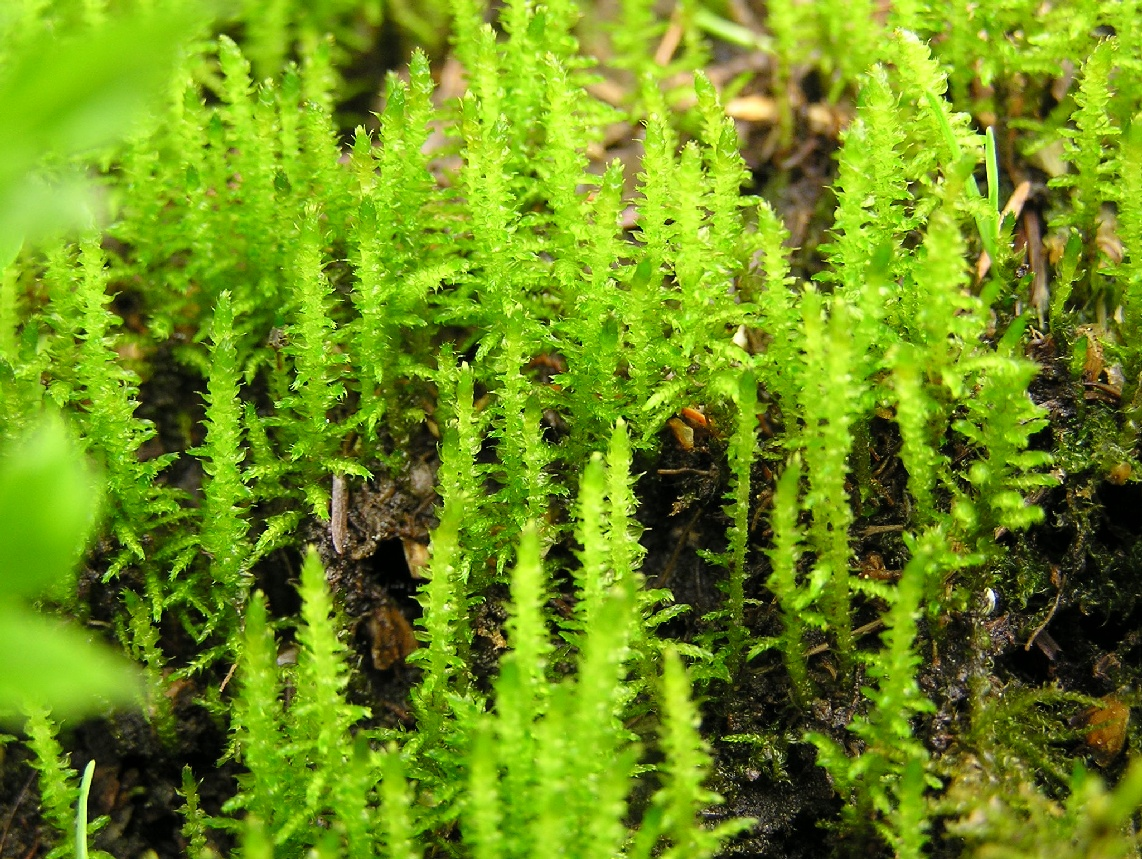

Scientific classification
- Kingdom: Plantae
- Division: Bryophyta
- Class: Bryopsida
- Subclass: Bryidae
- Order: Hypnales
- Family: Amblystegiaceae
- Genus: Palustriella; Ochyra

= Palustriella =

Genus of mosses

Palustriella is a genus of mosses belonging to the family Amblystegiaceae.

The species of this genus are found in Eurasia and Northern America.

Species:

- Palustriella commutata Ochyra, 1989
- Palustriella decipiens Ochyra, 1989
