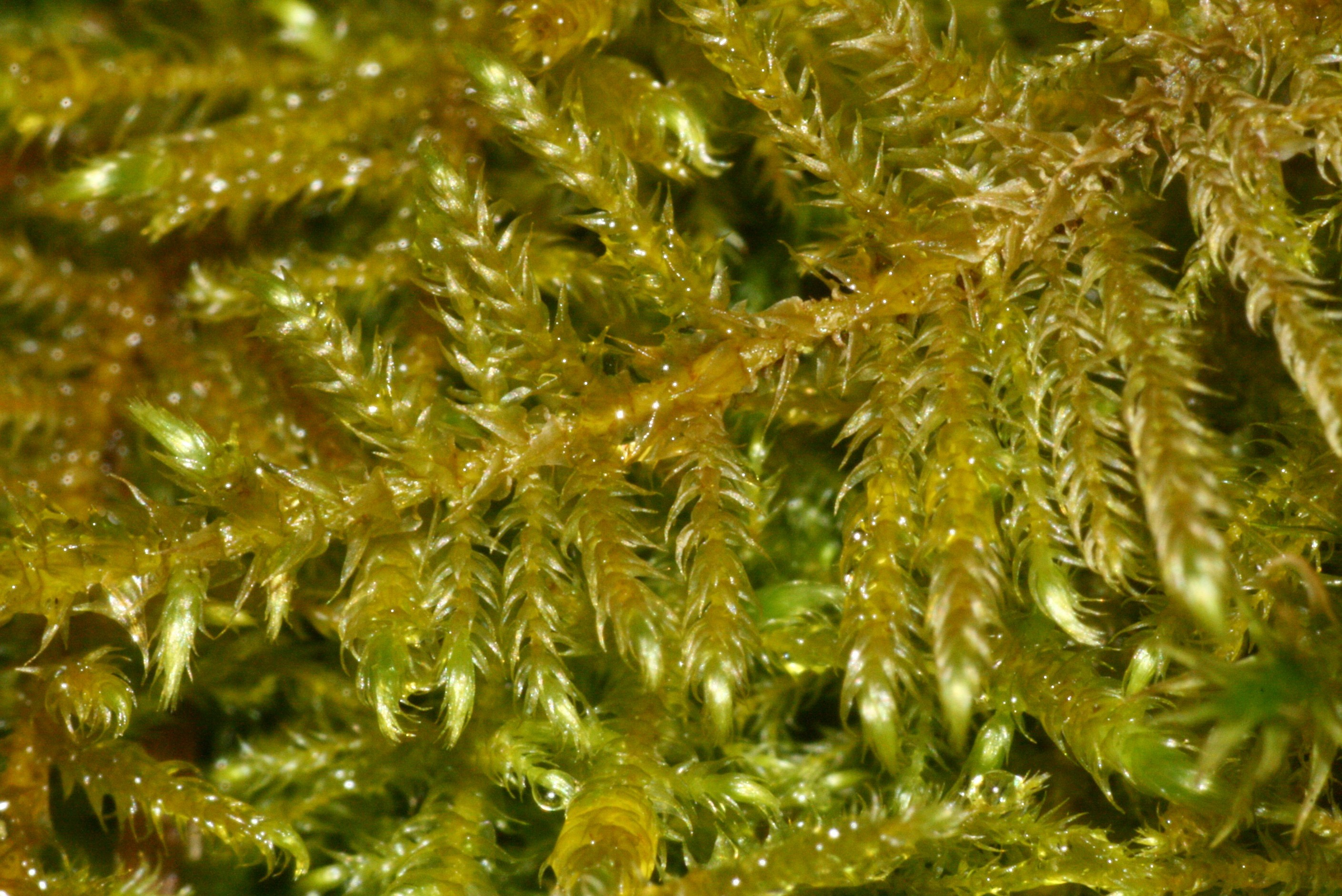
- Cratoneuron filicinum

Scientific classification
- Kingdom: Plantae
- Division: Bryophyta
- Class: Bryopsida
- Subclass: Bryidae
- Order: Hypnales
- Family: Amblystegiaceae
- Genus: Cratoneuron (Sull.) Spruce

Synonyms
- Cratoneurum I.Hagen, 1910

= Cratoneuron =

Genus of mosses

Cratoneuron is a genus of mosses belonging to the family Amblystegiaceae. The genus has a cosmopolitan distribution.

== Species ==
The following species are recognised in the genus Cratoneuron:

- Cratoneuron commutatovirescens Amann, 1918
- Cratoneuron curvicaule (Jur.) G.Roth
- Cratoneuron drepanocladioides Broth.
- Cratoneuron filicinum (Fiorini-Mazzanti) Latzel, 1931
- Cratoneuron filicinum Spruce, 1867
- Cratoneuron formianum (Fiorini-Mazzanti) G.Roth, 1899
- Cratoneuron formosanum Brotherus, 1928
- Cratoneuron kerguelense (Mitt.) Broth.
- Cratoneuron latifolium (S.Okamura) Broth.
- Cratoneuron longicostatum Bai Xue-liang, 1997
- Cratoneuron mendozense Herzog
- Cratoneuron oedogonium Müll.Hal.
- Cratoneuron punae C.Müller, 1897
- Cratoneuron subcurvicaule Potier de la Varde, 1955
- Cratoneuron sulcatoirrigatum Meylan, 1931
- Cratoneuron tenerrimum Kanda, 1975
- Cratoneuron williamsii Grout
