= Pseudocampylium =

Scientific classification
- Kingdom: Plantae
- Division: Bryophyta
- Class: Bryopsida
- Subclass: Bryidae
- Order: Hypnales
- Family: Amblystegiaceae
- Genus: Pseudocampylium; Vanderp. & Hedenäs

Genus of mosses

Pseudocampylium is a genus of mosses belonging to the family Amblystegiaceae.

The species of this genus are found in Europe and Northern America.

Species:

- Pseudocampylium radicale (P.Beauv.) Vanderp. & Hedenäs
