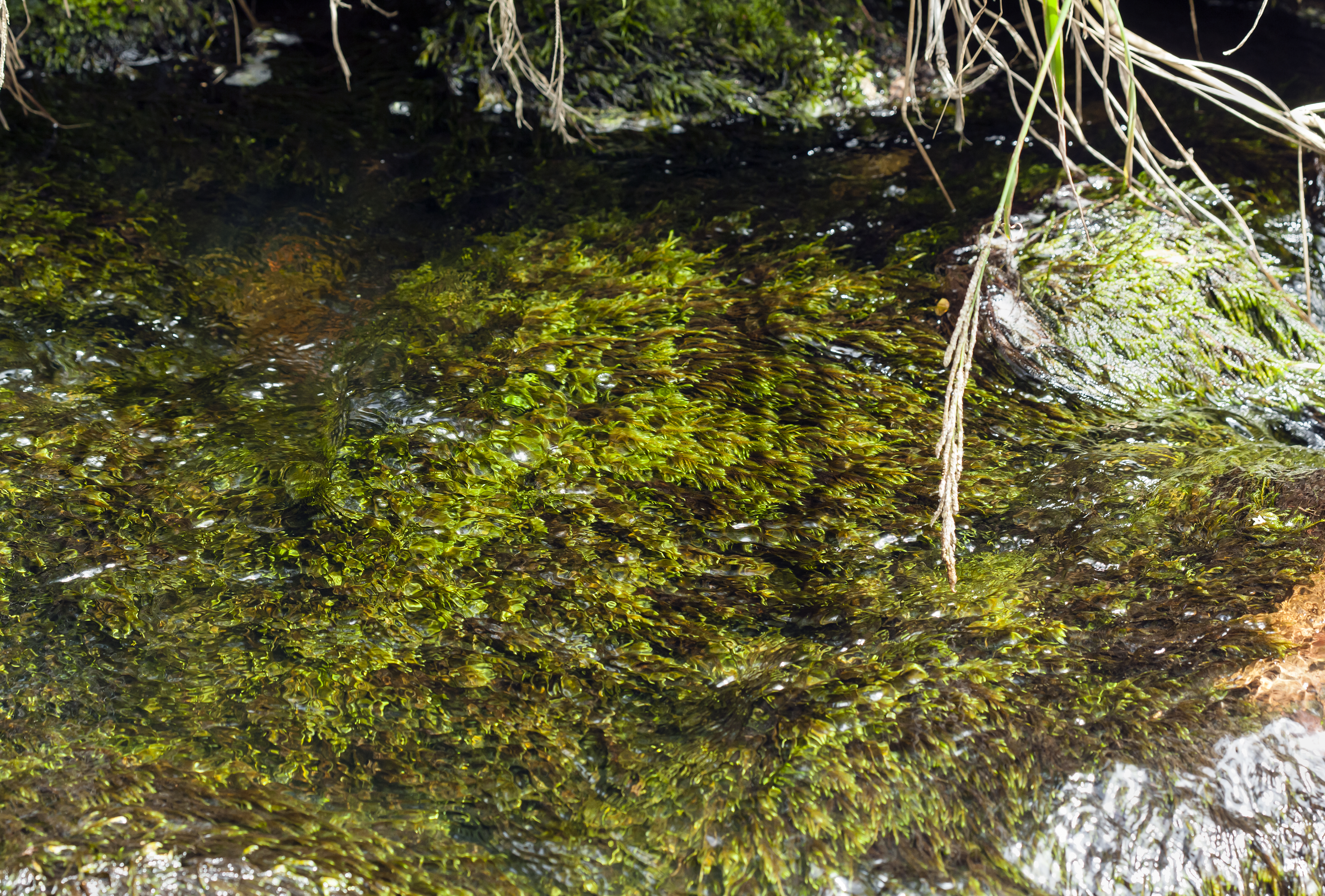
- Limbella tricostata

Scientific classification
- Kingdom: Plantae
- Clade: Embryophytes
- Division: Bryophyta
- Class: Bryopsida
- Subclass: Bryidae
- Order: Hypnales
- Family: Amblystegiaceae
- Genus: Limbella (Müll. Hal.) Müll. Hal.

= Limbella =

Genus of mosses

Limbella is a genus of mosses in the family Amblystegiaceae. It contains the following species (but this list may be incomplete):

- Limbella fryei, (R.S. Williams) Ochyra
- Limbella tricostata, (Sull.) Müll. Hal. ex E.B. Bartram
- Limbella bartlettii
- Limbella conspissata
- Limbella limbata
