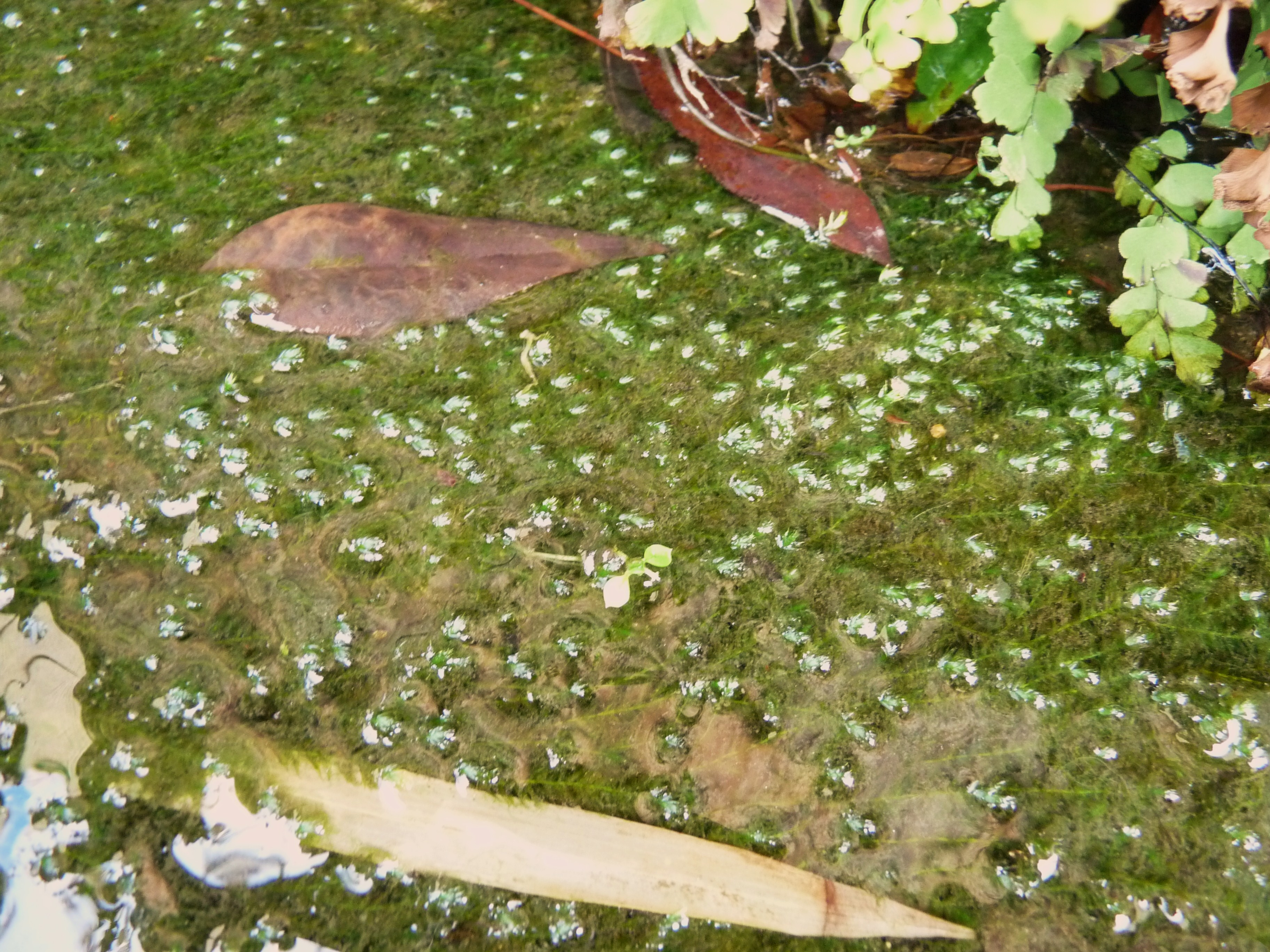
- Leptodictyum riparium

Scientific classification
- Kingdom: Plantae
- Division: Bryophyta
- Class: Bryopsida
- Subclass: Bryidae
- Order: Hypnales
- Family: Amblystegiaceae
- Genus: Leptodictyum (Schimp.) Warnst.

= Leptodictyum =

Genus of mosses

Leptodictyum is a genus of mosses belonging to the family Amblystegiaceae.

The genus has cosmopolitan distribution.

Species:

- Leptodictyum bandaiense (Broth. & Paris ex Takaki) Kanda
- Leptodictyum riparium
