= Karl Gustav Sanio =

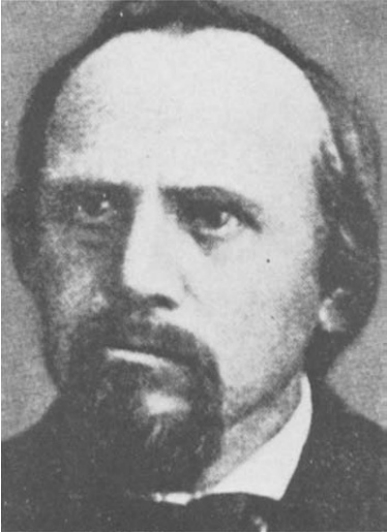

Karl Gustav Sanio (5 December 1832 – 3 February 1891) was a Prussian botanist and served as a professor of botany at the University of Königsberg. He observed patterns in the growth of plant vasculature and wrote several articles on the organization of wood and cambium. He examined patterns in the size distribution of the xylem vessels in five statements known as Sanio's laws was also among the first to describe the formation of compression wood by conifers.

== Life ==
Sanio was born in Lyck in a wealthy family and became interested in nature in the vast family estate. He studied botany under Ernst Meyer at the University of Königsberg and then moved to study medicine. He published his first note at the age of 24 on the spores of Equisetum. Unhappy with medical studies, he moved back to study botany at Berlin under Alexander Braun and Nathanael Pringsheim. He received a doctorate in 1858 and then taught botany after moving back to Königsberg. He suffered from a stroke on January 28, 1891 and was unconscious until his death on February 3.

== Sanio's laws ==
In 1872 he published a series of observations on a pattern in the size of xylem tracheids, increasing in size from the top of a tree to a certain height after which they decrease again to the base of the tree. He expressed these as five patterns that go by the name of Sanio's laws. Sanio's Laws are chiefly considered to hold in coniferous woods:

1. Tracheids increase in size from inside to outside of the wood (as seen in annual rings) in stem and branches. Thus they increase with age to a peak and then stay constant.
2. The constant size varies in the stem, increasing upwards but diminishing after a certain height.
3. The constant size in branches is smaller than in stems leading to them
4. In gnarled branches, the size of tracheids in outer rings can be smaller.
5. In growth rings of the roots the width of the tracheid increases and decreases before rising again to the constant size

Sanio was also the first to note the formation of wood of high density under special circumstances.

The bryophyte genus Sanionia was named after him.

The standard author abbreviation Sanio is used to indicate this person as the author when citing a botanical name.
