= Serpoleskea =

Scientific classification
- Kingdom: Plantae
- Division: Bryophyta
- Class: Bryopsida
- Subclass: Bryidae
- Order: Hypnales
- Family: Amblystegiaceae
- Genus: Serpoleskea (Limpr. ex Hampe) Loeske

Genus of mosses

Serpoleskea is a genus of mosses belonging to the family Amblystegiaceae.

Species:

- Serpoleskea confervoides (Brid.) Loeske
- Serpoleskea sprucei (Bruch) Loeske
