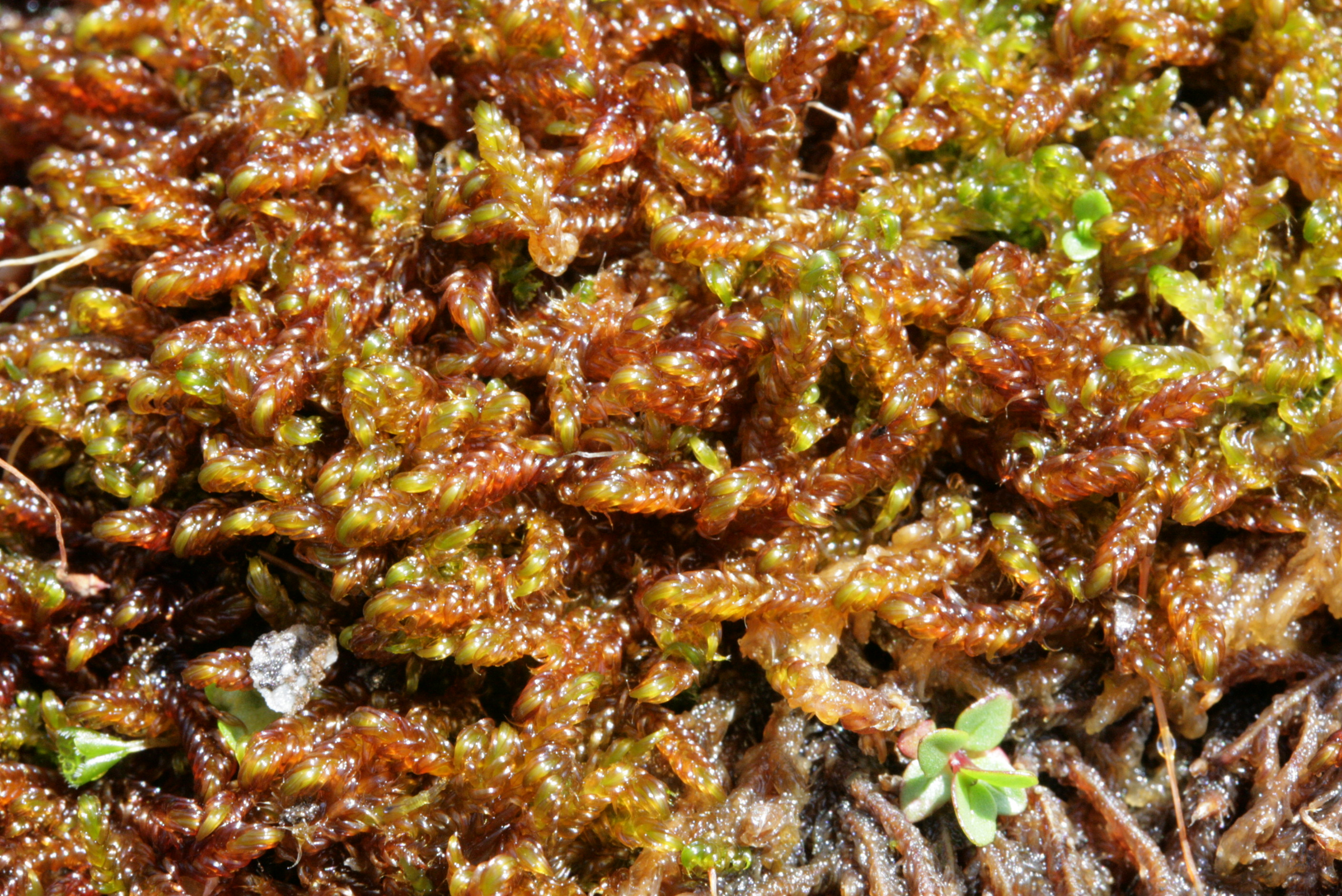
- Scorpidium revolvens

Scientific classification
- Kingdom: Plantae
- Division: Bryophyta
- Class: Bryopsida
- Subclass: Bryidae
- Order: Hypnales
- Family: Amblystegiaceae
- Genus: Scorpidium (Schimp.) Limpr.

= Scorpidium =

Genus of mosses

Scorpidium is a genus of mosses belonging to the family Amblystegiaceae.

The genus has an almost cosmopolitan distribution.

== Species ==
The following species are recognised in the genus:

- Scorpidium cossonii (Schimp.) Hedenäs
- Scorpidium revolvens Rubers
- Scorpidium scorpioides (Hedw.) Limpr.
