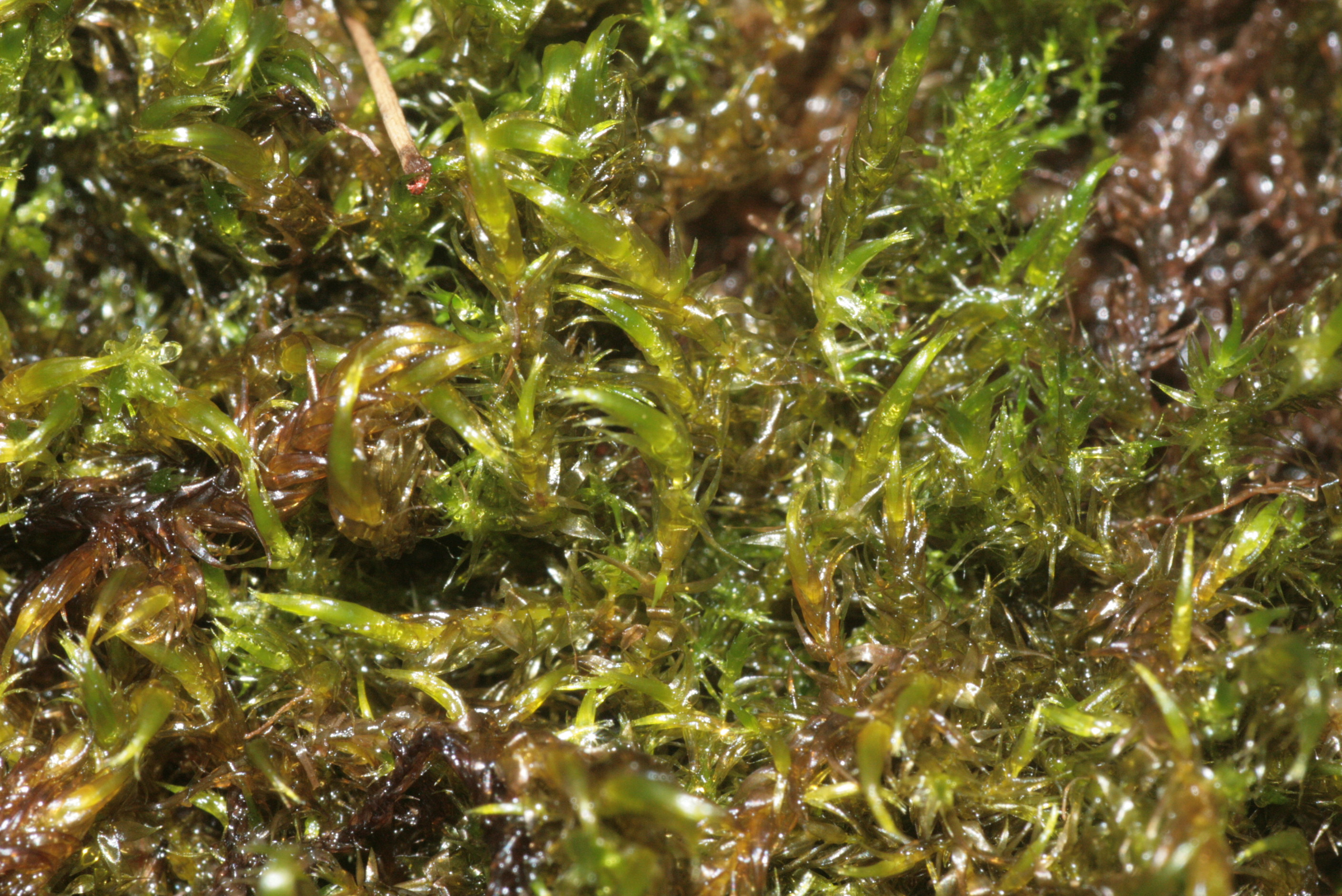
- Warnstorfia fluitans

Scientific classification
- Kingdom: Plantae
- Division: Bryophyta
- Class: Bryopsida
- Subclass: Bryidae
- Order: Hypnales
- Family: Amblystegiaceae
- Genus: Warnstorfia; Loeske 1907

Species
- Warnstorfia exannulata Loeske, 1907; Warnstorfia fluitans Loeske, 1907; Warnstorfia fontinaliopsis (Müll.Hal.) Ochyra; Warnstorfia kurilensis (Smirnova) Schljakov; Warnstorfia laculosa (Müll.Hal.) Ochyra & Matteri; Warnstorfia luipichensis Hedenäs, 1993; Warnstorfia orthophylla (Milde) Loeske; Warnstorfia procera Tuomikoski, 1973; Warnstorfia pseudorufescens (Warnst.) Loeske; Warnstorfia pseudosarmentosa Tuomikoski & T.Koponen, 1979; Warnstorfia pseudostraminea Tuomikoski & T.Koponen, 1979; Warnstorfia rotae (De Not.) Wheld.; Warnstorfia sarmentosa Hedenäs, 1993; Warnstorfia serrata (Lindb.) Wheld.; Warnstorfia stenophylla (Schimp.) Wheld.; Warnstorfia trichophylla Tuomikoski & T.Koponen, 1979; Warnstorfia tundrae Loeske, 1907

= Warnstorfia =

Genus of mosses

Warnstorfia is a genus of mosses. They are known as fattigkrokmossor in Swedish and sikkelmos p.p. in Dutch. It was named in honor of Carl Friedrich Warnstorf.
