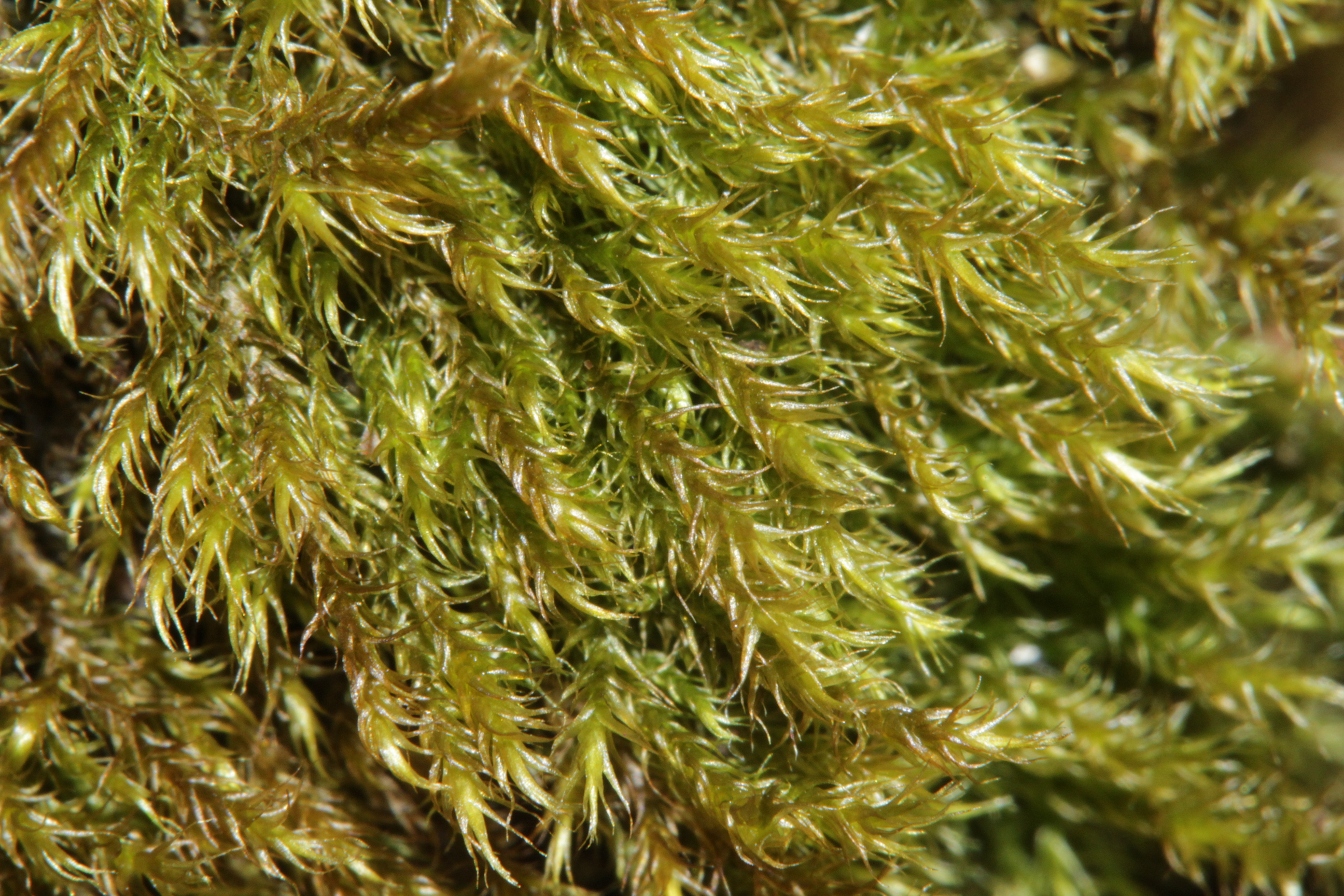
- Campyliadelphus chrysophyllus

Scientific classification
- Kingdom: Plantae
- Division: Bryophyta
- Class: Bryopsida
- Subclass: Bryidae
- Order: Hypnales
- Family: Amblystegiaceae
- Genus: Campyliadelphus (Kindb.) R.S.Chopra

= Campyliadelphus =

Genus of mosses

Campyliadelphus is a genus of mosses belonging to the family Amblystegiaceae.

The genus was first described by Nils Conrad Kindberg.

The genus has cosmopolitan distribution.

Species:

- Campyliadelphus chrysophyllus
- Campyliadelphus elodes
