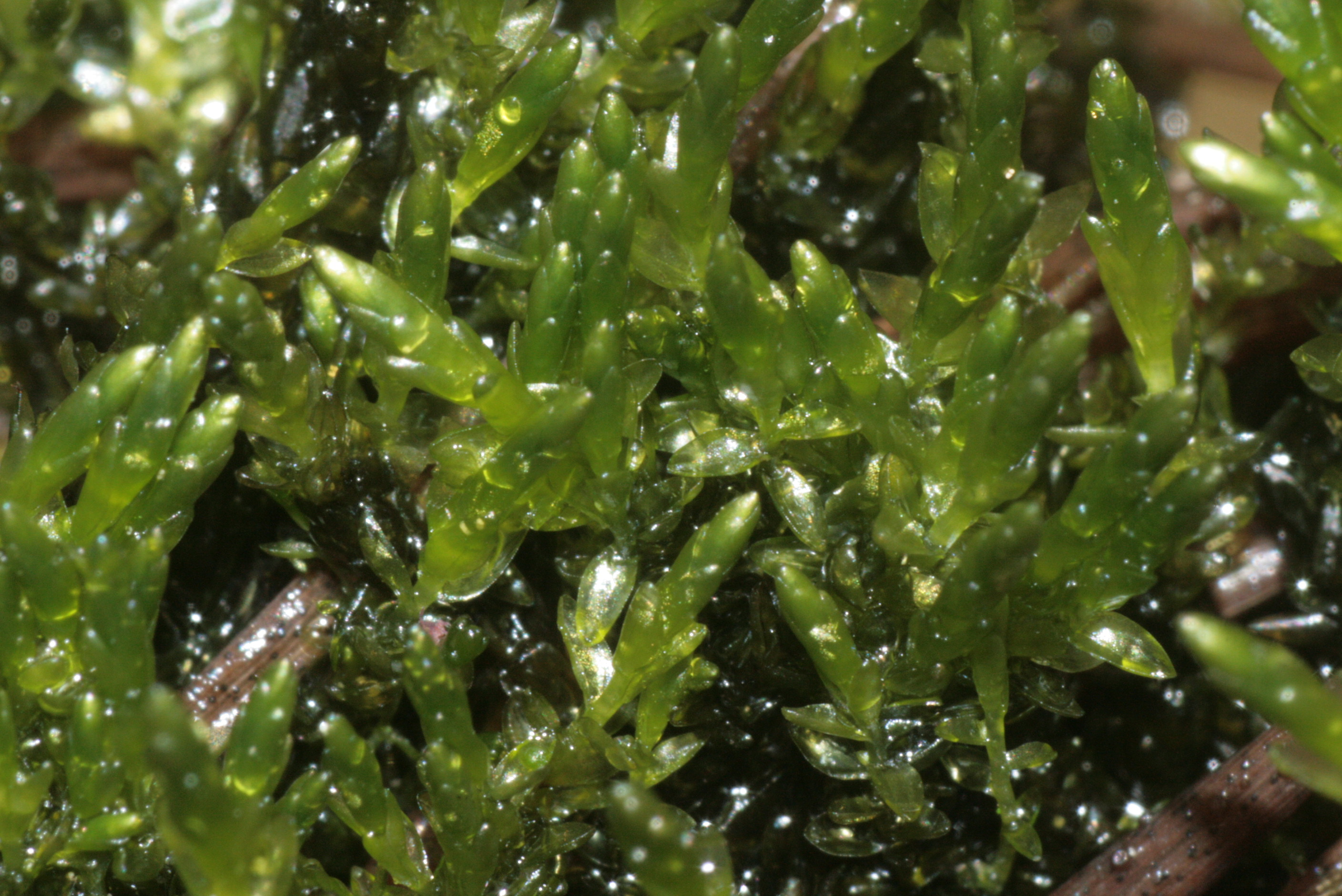
- Straminergon stramineum

Scientific classification
- Kingdom: Plantae
- Division: Bryophyta
- Class: Bryopsida
- Subclass: Bryidae
- Order: Hypnales
- Family: Calliergonaceae
- Genus: Straminergon; Hedenäs

= Straminergon =

Genus of mosses

Straminergon is a genus of mosses belonging to the family Amblystegiaceae.

The genus has almost cosmopolitan distribution.

Species:

- Straminergon stramineum Hedenäs, 1993
