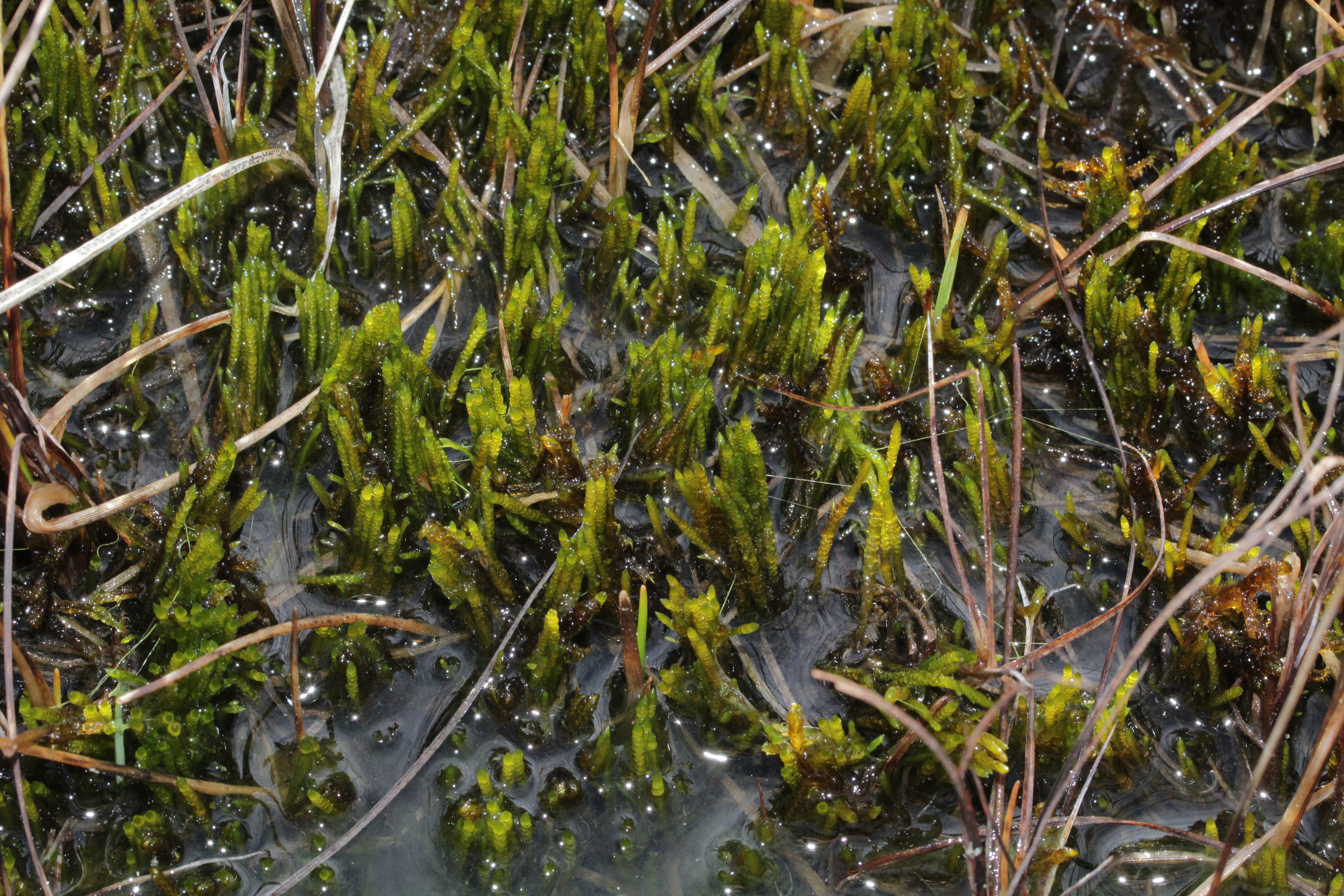

Scientific classification
- Kingdom: Plantae
- Division: Bryophyta
- Class: Bryopsida
- Subclass: Bryidae
- Order: Hypnales
- Family: Amblystegiaceae
- Genus: Drepanocladus
- Species: D. trifarius

Binomial name
- Drepanocladus trifarius (F.Weber & D.Mohr) Broth.

Synonyms
- List: Acrocladium trifarium (F.Weber & D.Mohr) P.W.Richards & E.C.Wallace; Amblystegium trifarium (F.Weber & D.Mohr) De Not.; Calliergon trifarium (F.Weber & D.Mohr) Kindb.; Calliergon trifarium f. giganteum (Warnst.) Podp.; Calliergon trifarium f. patens (Mönk.) Podp.; Calliergon trifarium subsp. apiculatum Kindb.; Calliergon trifarium var. giganteum Warnst.; Calliergon trifarium var. patens Mönk.; Drepanocladus trifarius (F.Weber & D.Mohr) Paris; Hypnum sarmentosum var. trifarium (F.Weber & D.Mohr) Sommerf.; Hypnum stramineum var. trifarium (F.Weber & D.Mohr) Dalla Torre; Hypnum trifarium F.Weber & D.Mohr; Pseudocalliergon trifarium (F.Weber & D.Mohr) Loeske; Scorpidium trifarium (F.Weber & D.Mohr) H.K.G.Paul; Stereodon trifarius (F.Weber & D.Mohr) Brid.

= Drepanocladus trifarius =

Species of moss

Drepanocladus trifarius, the three-ranked spear-moss, is a species of moss belonging to the family Amblystegiaceae.

It has almost cosmopolitan distribution.
