= Sarmentypnum =

Scientific classification
- Kingdom: Plantae
- Division: Bryophyta
- Class: Bryopsida
- Subclass: Bryidae
- Order: Hypnales
- Family: Calliergonaceae
- Genus: Sarmentypnum; Tuom. & T.J.Kop.

Genus of mosses

Sarmentypnum is a genus of mosses belonging to the family Calliergonaceae.

The genus has cosmopolitan distribution.

Species:

- Sarmentypnum exannulatum (Schimp.) Hedenäs
- Sarmentypnum luipichense (R.S.Williams) Hedenäs
