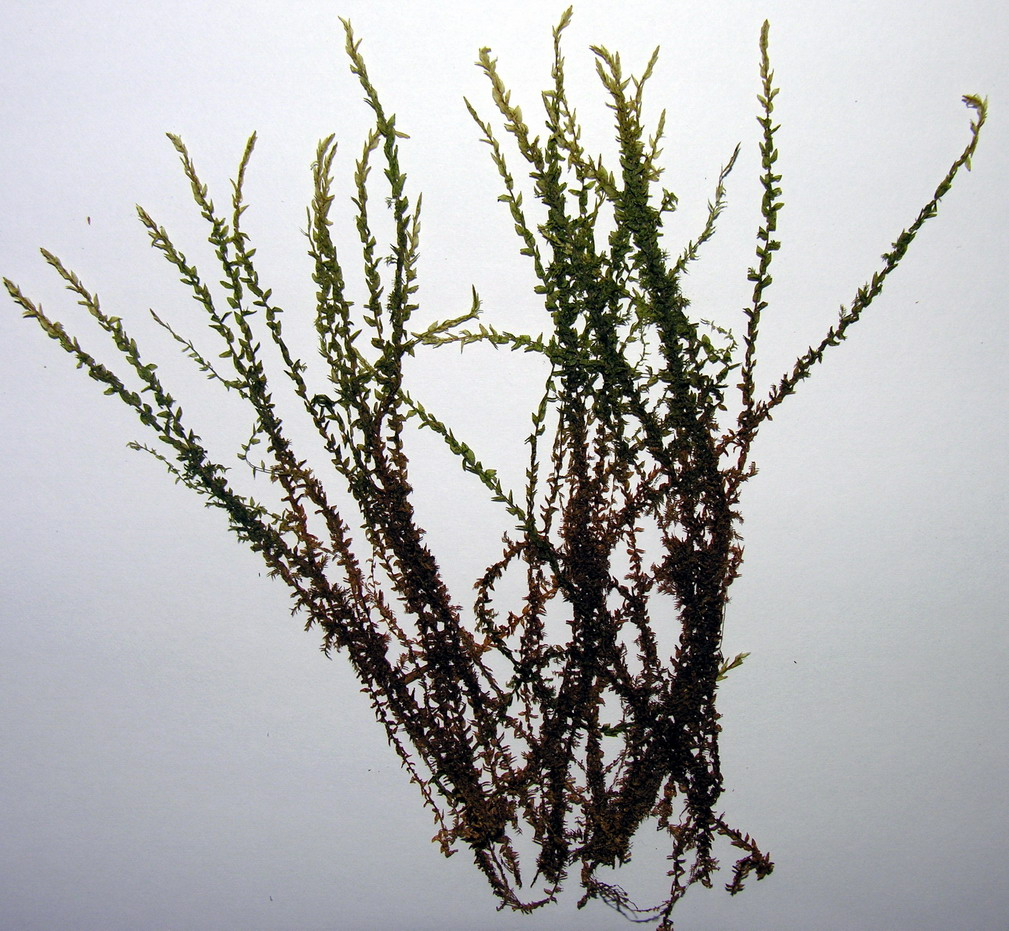

Scientific classification
- Kingdom: Plantae
- Division: Bryophyta
- Class: Bryopsida
- Subclass: Bryidae
- Order: Hypnales
- Family: Calliergonaceae
- Genus: Calliergon (Sull.) Kindb.

= Calliergon =

Genus of mosses

Calliergon is a genus of moss in the order Hypnales. The species in the genus are commonly referred to as calliergon mosses.

== Species ==
The following species are recognised in the genus Calliergon:

- Calliergon acuminatum Dixon
- †Calliergon aftonianum Steere
- Calliergon cordifolium (Hedw.) Kindb.
- †Calliergon diluvianum (Schimp.) Dixon
- Calliergon giganteum (Schimp.) Kindb.
- †Calliergon hanseniae Steere
- †Calliergon kayanum Steere
- Calliergon megalophyllum Mikut.
- Calliergon orbicularicordatum (Renauld & Cardot) Broth.
- Calliergon richardsonii (Mitt.) Kindb. ex G. Roth
