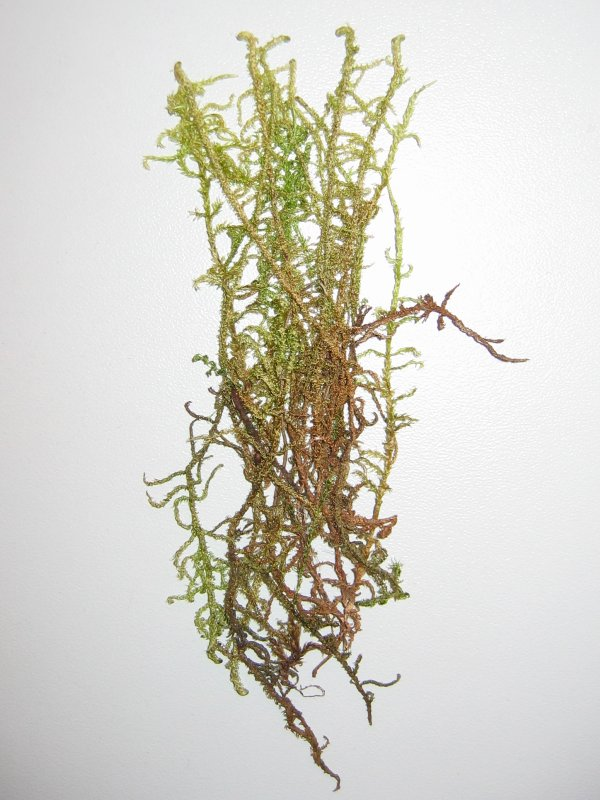
- Drepanocladus vernicosus

Scientific classification
- Kingdom: Plantae
- Division: Bryophyta
- Class: Bryopsida
- Subclass: Bryidae
- Order: Hypnales
- Family: Amblystegiaceae
- Genus: Drepanocladus (C.Müller Hal.) G.Roth, 1899

Synonyms
- Drepano-Hypnum Hampe; Richardsiopsis Ochyra

= Drepanocladus =

Genus of mosses

Drepanocladus is a genus of mosses belonging to the family Amblystegiaceae. It has a cosmopolitan distribution

== Species ==
The following species are recognised in the genus Drepanocladus:

- Drepanocladus aduncus (Hedw.) Warnst.
- Drepanocladus andinus (Mitt.) Broth. ex Paris
- Drepanocladus angustifolius (Hedenäs) Hedenäs & Rosborg
- Drepanocladus apiculatus Steere
- Drepanocladus arcticus (R.S. Williams) Hedenäs
- Drepanocladus arnellii (Sanio) G.Roth
- Drepanocladus asturicus (Renauld) Wheldon
- Drepanocladus austroaduncus (Müll. Hal.) Broth. ex Paris
- Drepanocladus austrofluitans (Müll. Hal.) Broth. ex Paris
- Drepanocladus brachiatus (Mitt.) Dixon
- Drepanocladus brevifolius (Lindb.) Warnst.
- Drepanocladus brevinervis (Broth.) Broth. ex Paris
- Drepanocladus brotheri (Sanio) G.Roth
- Drepanocladus capillifolius (Warnst.) Warnst.
- Drepanocladus contiguus (Nees) Loeske
- Drepanocladus falcifolius (Renauld) Mikut.
- Drepanocladus flageyi (Renauld) Wheld.
- Drepanocladus fontinaloides (Hampe) Broth. ex Paris
- Drepanocladus fuegianus (Mitt.) Broth. ex Paris
- Drepanocladus furcatus G.Roth & Bock
- Drepanocladus gigas (Warnst.) Mikut.
- Drepanocladus haeringianus (Ettingsh.) Broth.
- Drepanocladus hallii Brotherus & Dixon
- Drepanocladus hamifolius (Schimp.) G. Roth
- Drepanocladus hercynicus (Warnst.) G.Roth
- Drepanocladus hollosianus (Schilb.) Györffy
- Drepanocladus hyperboreus (Bryhn) Grout
- Drepanocladus jacuticus Ignatov & Ignatova
- Drepanocladus jamesii-macounii (Kindb.) Grout
- Drepanocladus kurilensis Smirnova
- Drepanocladus latinervis Warnstorf
- Drepanocladus longifolius (Wilson ex Mitt.) Broth. ex Paris
- Drepanocladus lycopodioides (Brid.) Warnst.
- Drepanocladus minnesotensis R.S.Williams
- Drepanocladus perplicatus (Dusén) G. Roth
- Drepanocladus polygamus (Schimp.) Hedenäs
- Drepanocladus secundifolius (Müll. Hal.) Dixon
- Drepanocladus sendtneri (Schimp. ex H. Müll.) Warnst.
- Drepanocladus sinensiuncinatus Müll. Hal.
- Drepanocladus sordidus (Müll. Hal.) Hedenäs
- Drepanocladus sparsus Müll. Hal.
- Drepanocladus stagnatus Zarnowiec
- Drepanocladus subjulaceus (Schimp.) Roiv.
- Drepanocladus subpiliger (Renauld) Vict.
- Drepanocladus symmetricus (Renauld & Cardot) Cardot
- Drepanocladus trifarius (F. Weber & D. Mohr) Broth.
- Drepanocladus turgescens (T. Jensen) Broth.
