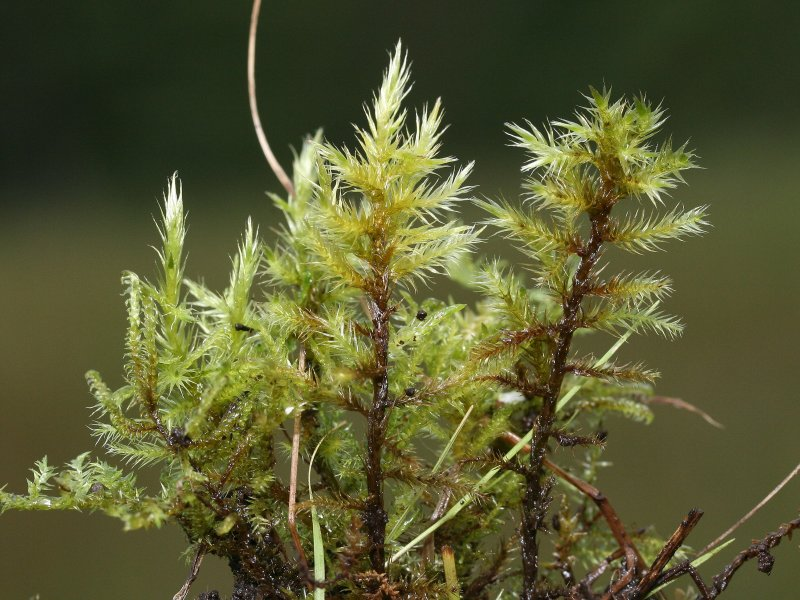
- Tomenthypnum nitens

Scientific classification
- Kingdom: Plantae
- Division: Bryophyta
- Class: Bryopsida
- Subclass: Bryidae
- Order: Hypnales
- Family: Brachytheciaceae
- Genus: Tomentypnum; Loeske

Synonyms
- Tomenthypnum Loeske

= Tomentypnum =

Genus of mosses

Tomentypnum is a genus of mosses belonging to the family Brachytheciaceae.

The species of this genus are found in Northern Hemisphere.

== Species ==
The following species are recognised:

- Tomentypnum falcifolium Tuomikoski, 1967
- Tomentypnum involutum (Limpr.) Hedenäs & Ignatov
- Tomentypnum nitens (Hedw.) Loeske
- Tomentypnum vittii Hedenäs & Ignatov
