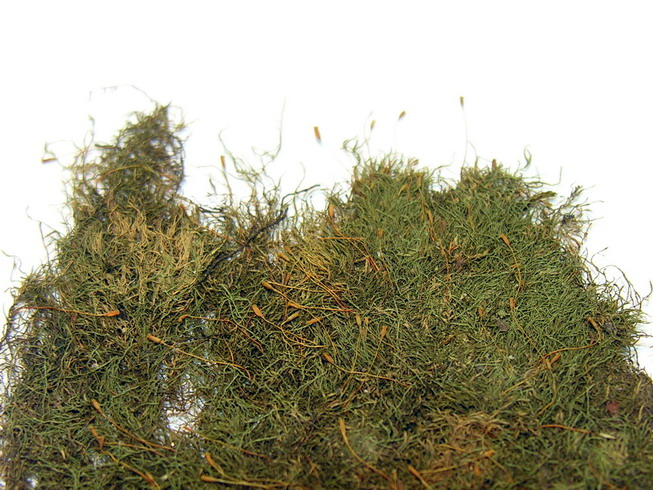
- Amblystegium serpens

Scientific classification
- Kingdom: Plantae
- Division: Bryophyta
- Class: Bryopsida
- Subclass: Bryidae
- Order: Hypnales
- Family: Amblystegiaceae
- Genus: Amblystegium; Schimp.

= Amblystegium =

Genus of mosses

Amblystegium is a genus of moss belonging to the family Amblystegiaceae. The genus was described in 1853 by Wilhelm Philippe Schimper. The genus has cosmopolitan distribution.

Species:

- Amblyaspis belus
- Amblyaspis prorsa
- Amblyaspis roboris
- Amblyaspis scelionoides
- Amblystegium serpens
- Amblystegium tenax
- Amblyaspis tritici
