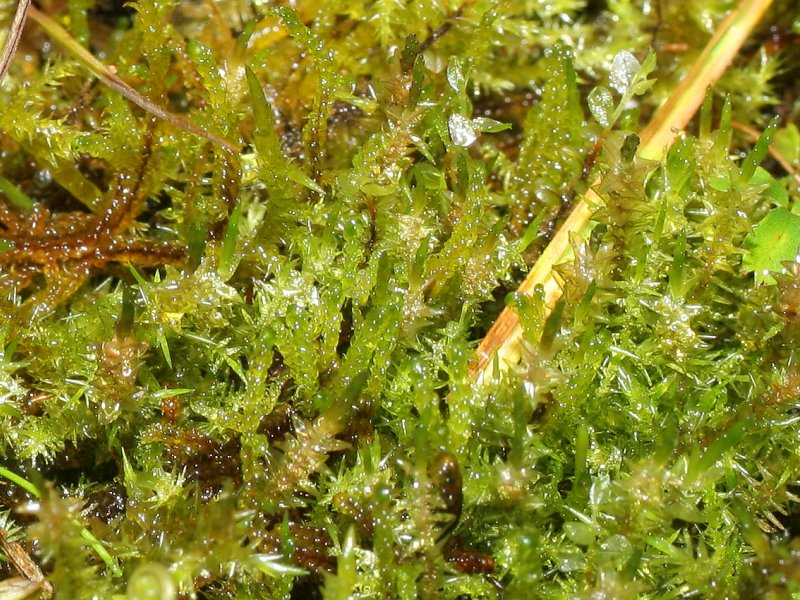

Scientific classification
- Kingdom: Plantae
- Division: Bryophyta
- Class: Bryopsida
- Subclass: Bryidae
- Order: Hypnales
- Family: Calliergonaceae
- Genus: Calliergon
- Species: C. giganteum

Binomial name
- Calliergon giganteum (Schimp.) Kindb.

= Calliergon giganteum =

Species of moss

Calliergon giganteum, the giant spearmoss, giant calliergon moss, or arctic moss, is an aquatic plant found on lake beds in tundra regions. It has no wood stems or flowers, and has small rootlets instead of roots.

Calliergon giganteum survives in the cold climate by storing nutrients to be used in the formation of new leaves in the spring. It can survive with less available nitrogen than any other known plant. It is one of about 2000 plant species on the tundra, most of which are mosses and lichens. The plant is eaten by migrating animals such as birds. The ground cover of Calliergon giganteum in the arctic has a warming effect which other plants benefit from.

"Calliergon giganteum" grows to be about 8 cm tall. The leaves live for "at least four years", possibly the longest living of any moss.

Calliergon giganteum prefers hydric environments, growing best in wet and humid conditions. For photosynthesis, the optimum water content is 1500-1700% of the moss's dry weight.
