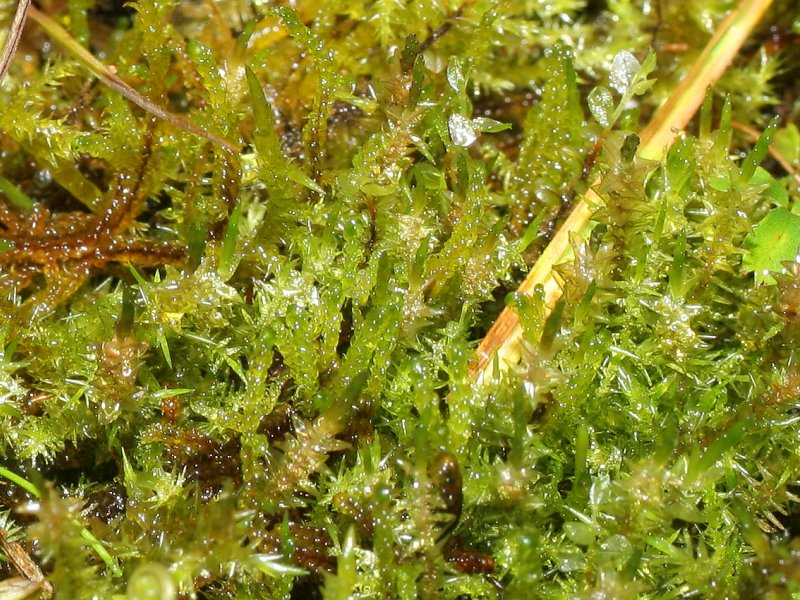
- Calliergon giganteum

Scientific classification
- Kingdom: Plantae
- Division: Bryophyta
- Class: Bryopsida
- Subclass: Bryidae
- Order: Hypnales
- Family: Calliergonaceae

= Calliergonaceae =

Family of mosses

Calliergonaceae is a family of mosses belonging to the order Hypnales.

The family includes the following genera:

- Calliergon (Sull.) Kindb.
- Loeskypnum H.K.G.
- Sarmentypnum Tuom. & T.J.Kop.
- Straminergon Hedenäs
- Warnstorfia Loeske
