= Leopold Loeske =

German watchmaker and bryologist (1865–1935)

Leopold Loeske (24 October 1865, Hohensalza – 29 March 1935, Bad Harzburg) was a German watchmaker and amateur bryologist.

A skilled watchmaker, he was self-taught as a bryologist, collecting moss specimens in Germany, Switzerland and the French Alps during his career. Following World War I, he spent eight years working as a correspondent for a commercial institution due to financial struggles. He joined the British Bryological Society in 1934.

He died at Bad Harzburg while on a collection excursion in the Harz Mountains.

The moss genera Loeskeobryum (M.Fleisch. ex Broth. 1925) and Loeskypnum (H.K.G.Paul, 1916) are both named in his honor.

== Published works ==
He was the author of 70 published works, including a highly regarded monograph on European Grimmiaceae, "Monographie der europäischen Grimmiaceen" (1930). Other books by Loeske include:

- Moosflora des Harzes, 1903 - Mosses of the Harz.
- Studien zur vergleichenden morphologie und phylogonetischen systematik der laubmoose. 1910 - Studies involving comparative morphology and phylogenetic systematics of mosses.
- Die Laubmoose Europas. I, Grimmiaceae, 1913 - Mosses of Europe, Grimmiaceae.
- Die Laubmoose Europas. II, Funariaceae, 1914 - Mosses of Europe, Funariaceae.

Loeske was editor of the bryological journal, Bryologische Zeitschrift.

== See also ==
- Grimmia
