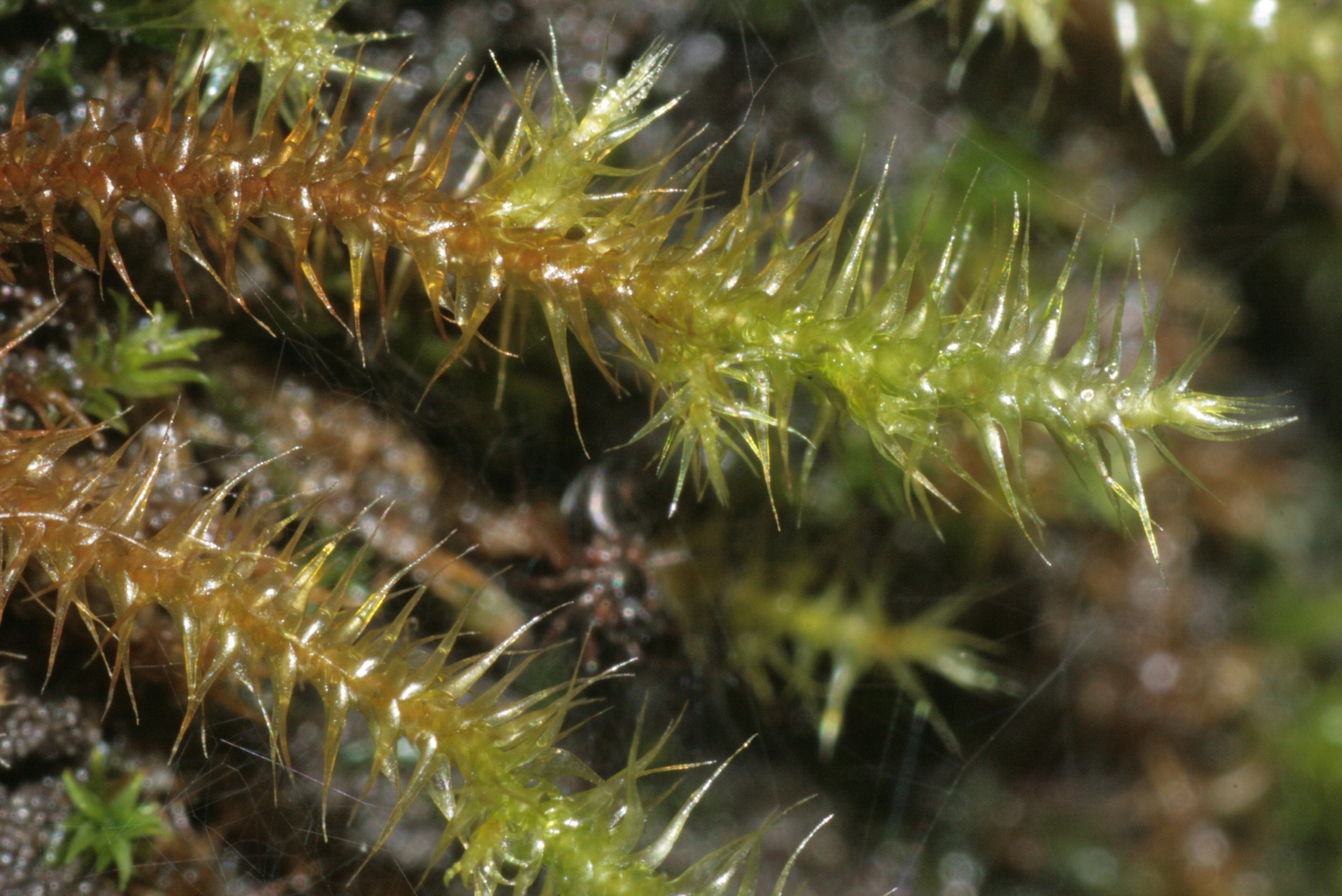
- Campylium stellatum

Scientific classification
- Kingdom: Plantae
- Clade: Embryophytes
- Division: Bryophyta
- Class: Bryopsida
- Subclass: Bryidae
- Order: Hypnales
- Family: Amblystegiaceae; Kindb.

Subfamilies
- Drepanocladoideae Kanda; Hygrohypnoideae Kanda; Sciaromiopsidoideae Ochyra; Cratoneuroideae Vanderp., Hedenäs, C.J. Cox & A.J. Shaw; Anacamptodontinae Vanderp., Hedenäs, C.J. Cox & A.J. Shaw; Amblystegioideae Broth.; Drepanocladinae Vanderp., Hedenäs, C.J. Cox & A.J. Shaw; Amblystegieae Vanderp., Hedenäs, C.J. Cox & A.J. Shaw; Amblystegiinae Vanderp., Hedenäs, C.J. Cox & A.J. Shaw

Synonyms
- Cratoneuraceae Mönk.; Donrichardsiaceae Ochyra; Hypnobartlettiaceae Ochyra; Vittiaceae Ochyra

= Amblystegiaceae =

Family of mosses

Amblystegiaceae is a family of mosses. It includes 20 to 30 genera with a total of up to 150 species. They occur nearly worldwide, growing in tropical, temperate, and subpolar regions.

These mosses are small to large in size and are yellow, green, or brown in color. Some are aquatic and some terrestrial. Most occur in wet habitat types. Many occur in substrates with a basic pH, but some grow in neutral to acidic substrates.

== Genera ==
Genera include:

- Amblystegium Schimp.1853 (e.g. Amblystegium serpens)
- Anacamptodon Brid.1818
- Arvernella Hugonnot & Hedenäs2015
- Bryostreimannia Ochyra1991
- Campylium (Sull.) Spruce1867
- Calliergon (Sull.) Kindb.1894
- Campylidium (Kindb.) Ochyra2003
- Campylium (Sull.) Mitt.1869
- Campylophyllopsis W.R. Buck2009
- Campylophyllum (Schimp.) M. Fleisch.1914
- Conardia H. Rob.1976
- Cratoneuron (Sull.) Spruce1867
- Cratoneuropsis (Broth.) M. Fleisch.1923
- Drepanium (Schimp.) Spruce1867
- Drepanocladus (Müll. Hal.) G. Roth1899
- Gradsteinia Ochyra1990
- Hygroamblystegium Loeske1903
- Hygrohypnum Lindb.1872 [1873]
- Jankuceraea Ignatov & Ignatova2022
- Kandaea Jan Kučera & Hedenäs2020
- Koponenia Ochyra1985
- Larrainia W.R. Buck2015
- Leptodictyum (Schimp.) Warnst.1906
- Limbella (Müll. Hal.) Renauld & Cardot1899
- Microamblystegium Fedosov, Ignatova & Jan Kučera2021
- Microhypnum Jan Kučera & Ignatov2019
- Palustriella Ochyra1989
- Pictus C.C. Towns.1983
- Platyhypnum Loeske1911
- †Protoochyraea Ignatov1990
- Pseudoamblystegium Vanderp. & Hedenäs2009
- Pseudocampylium Vanderp. & Hedenäs2009
- Sasaokaea Broth.1929
- †Sciaromiadelphus Abramova & I.I. Abramov1967
- Serpoleskea (Hampe ex Limpr.) Loeske1905
- Tomentypnum Loeske1911
- Vittia Ochyra1987

=== Formerly included ===
- Acrocladium Mitt.1869 – now in Acrocladiaceae
- Apterygium Kindb.1885 – synonym of Platydictya
- Callialaria Ochyra1989 – synonym of Cratoneuron
- Calliergidium Grout1929 – synonym of Drepanocladus
- Campyliadelphus (Kindb.) R.S. Chopra1975 – synonym of Campylium
- Donrichardsia H.A. Crum & L.E. Anderson1979 – now in Brachytheciaceae
- Hamatocaulis Hedenäs1989 – now in Scorpidiaceae
- Hygrohypnella Ignatov & Ignatova2004 – now in Scorpidiaceae
- †Hypnites Ettingsh.1855 – now in Tricostaceae
- Hypnobartlettia Ochyra1985 – synonym of Cratoneuropsis
- Limprichtia Loeske1907 – synonym of Scorpidium
- Loeskypnum H.K.G. Paul1918 – now in Calliergonaceae
- †Neocalliergon R.S. Williams1930 – now in Tricostaceae
- Ochyraea Váňa1986 – synonym of Platyhypnum
- Orthotheciella (Müll. Hal.) Ochyra1998 – synonym of Cratoneuropsis
- Platydictya Berk.1863 – now in Plagiotheciaceae
- Platylomella A.L. Andrews1950 – now in Leskeaceae
- Pseudocalliergon (Limpr.) Loeske1907 – synonym of Drepanocladus
- Pseudohygrohypnum Kanda1976 [1977] – now in Pylaisiaceae
- Richardsiopsis Ochyra1986 – synonym of Drepanocladus
- Sanionia Loeske1907 – now in Scorpidiaceae
- Sarmentypnum Tuom. & T.J. Kop.1979 – now in Calliergonaceae
- Sciaromiella Ochyra1986 – synonym of Vittia
- Sciaromiopsis Broth.1924 – synonym of Brachythecium
- Scorpidium (Schimp.) Limpr.1899 – now in Scorpidiaceae
- Sinocalliergon Sakurai1949 – synonym of Hydrogonium
- Straminergon Hedenäs1993 – now in Calliergonaceae
- Warnstorfia Loeske1907 – now in Calliergonaceae
