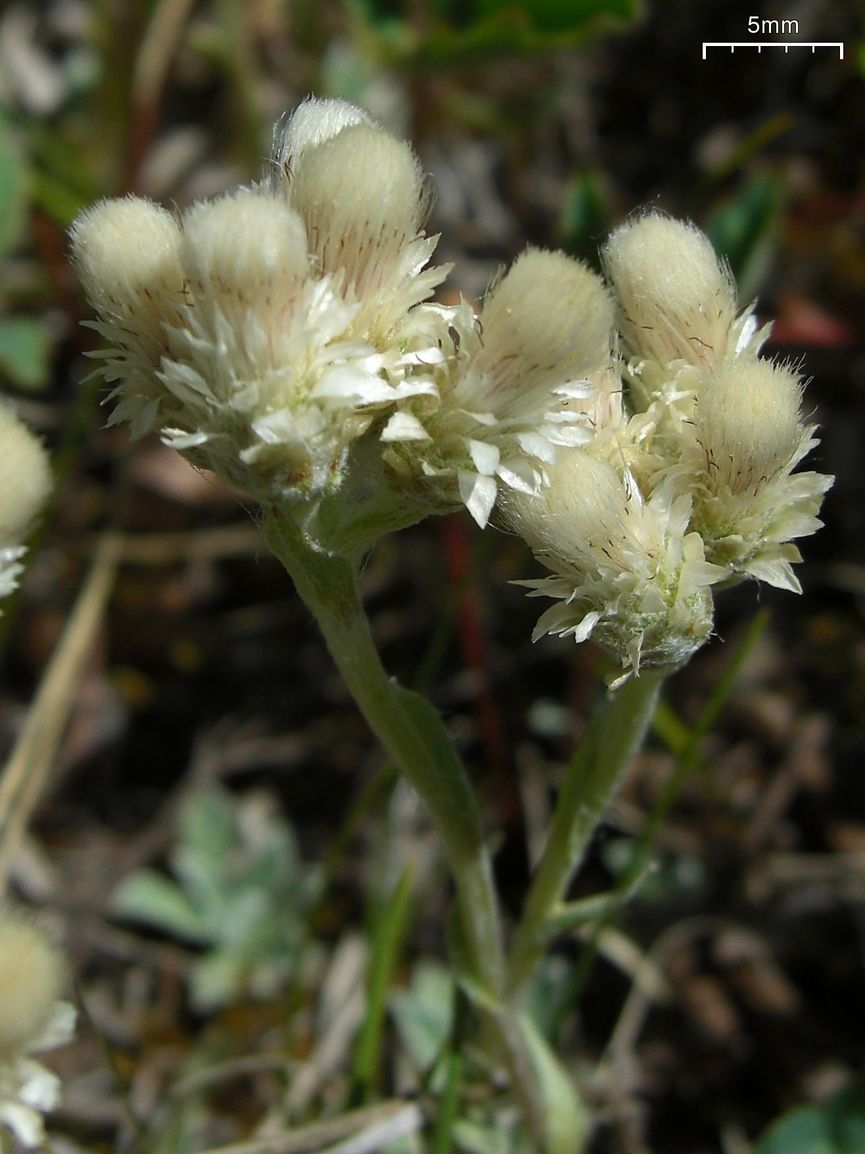

Conservation status
- Secure (NatureServe)

Scientific classification
- Kingdom: Plantae
- Clade: Tracheophytes
- Clade: Angiosperms
- Clade: Eudicots
- Clade: Asterids
- Order: Asterales
- Family: Asteraceae
- Genus: Antennaria
- Species: A. parvifolia

Binomial name
- Antennaria parvifolia Nutt.

Synonyms
- Synonymy: Antennaria aprica Greene; Antennaria aureola Lunell; Antennaria holmii Greene; Antennaria latisquamea Greene 1905 not Piper 1901; Antennaria minuscula B.Boivin; Antennaria obtusata Greene; Antennaria pumila Greene; Antennaria recurva Greene; Antennaria rhodantha Suksd.

= Antennaria parvifolia =

Species of flowering plant

Antennaria parvifolia is a species of flowering plant in the family Asteraceae, known by the common names small-leaf pussytoes and Nuttall's pussytoes (not to be confused with littleleaf pussytoes). It is native to western and central North America.

== Description ==
Antennaria parvifolia generally grows a few centimeters high but it may reach 15 cm (6 inches). The grayish, woolly-haired leaves are up to 3.5 cm (1 1/2 in) long, the upper ones shorter and narrower than the basal. The inflorescence contains 2 to 7 flower heads, each about 1.5 cm (1/2 in) across and blooming from July and September. The plant may be gynoecious, containing only female flowers, or dioecious, with some female plants and some male in a given population. Dioecious plants are most common in Colorado and New Mexico, and can reproduce sexually, though male plants are much less common than female. Plants in most other areas are mostly gynoecious, reproducing asexually via apomixis. The plant forms mats by spreading stolons and sprouting new stems. The flower heads are lined with an outer layer of phyllaries which are translucent except at the base, where they vary from white, red, green, and brown. The fruit is an achene with a pappus that helps it disperse on the wind.

Features that distinguish the species from other members of Antennaria include the clustered basal leaves and the near absence of dark bases on the backs of the flower bracts.

== Distribution and habitat ==
The species is native to western and central North America and widespread in Canada, the United States, and northern Mexico—from British Columbia east to Ontario and south to California, Chihuahua, and Nuevo León. It has not been observed in California since 1987.

It can be found in open and dry areas such as plains and openings in forests.

== Ecology ==
In Colorado, the species is an indicator of overgrazing and increases in frequency on heavily grazed land. It grows in disturbed habitat and a wide variety of ecosystems and soil types.

== Cultivation ==
Some forms of the small-leaf pussytoes are considered excellent groundcovers, particularly by gardeners of the American great plains. They prefer to grow in the open in more northerly areas like North Dakota and at higher elevations, but prefer partial shade in more southerly locations such as Texas or lower altitudes. They are valued for their handsome foliage, their spring flowers, and for their lack of an aggressive nature in even the most ideal of garden conditions. They require a well drained soil, but may struggle in hot areas in sandy soils. They are cold hardy to USDA zones 4 (as cold as −34 °C).
