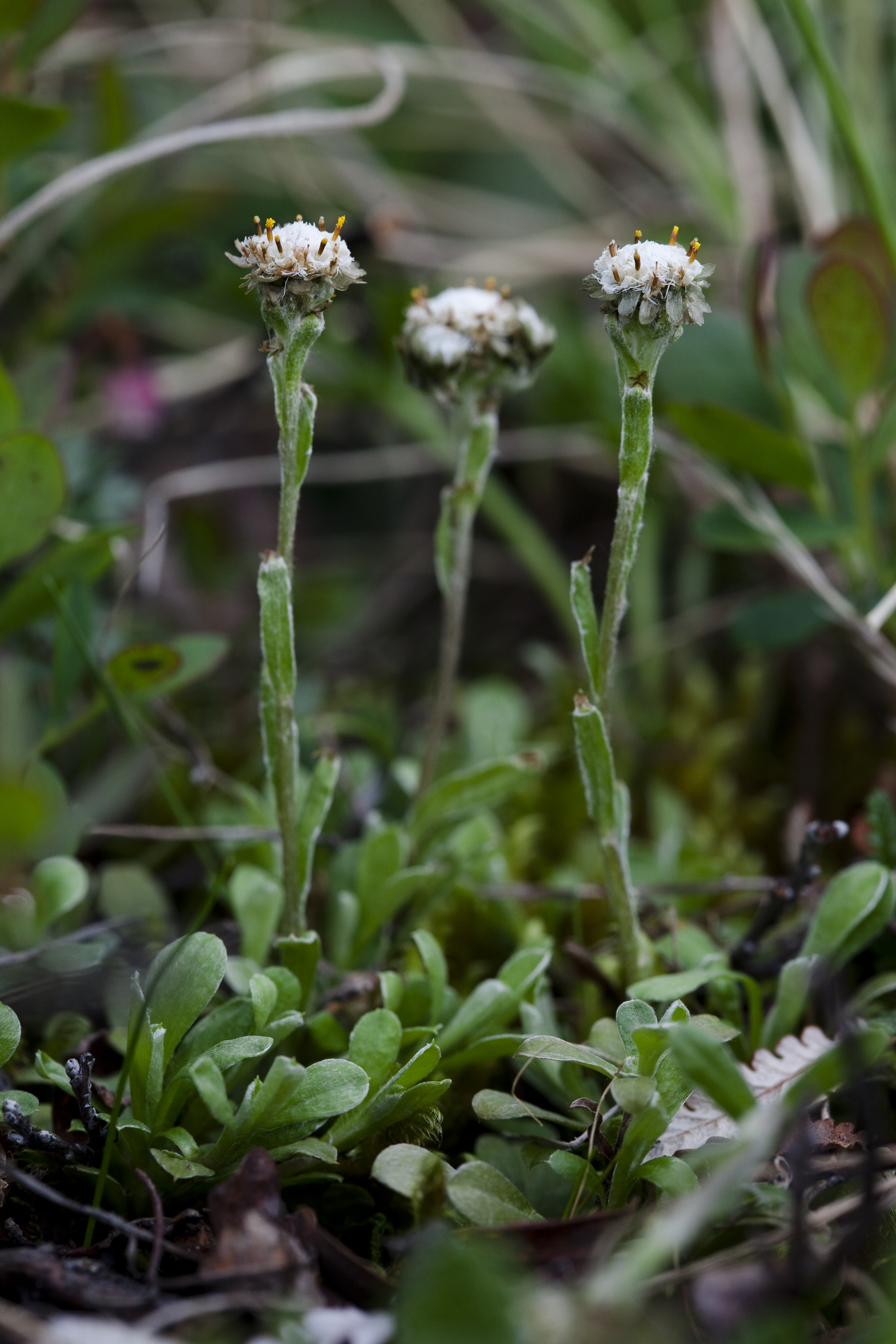

Conservation status
- Secure (NatureServe)

Scientific classification
- Kingdom: Plantae
- Clade: Tracheophytes
- Clade: Angiosperms
- Clade: Eudicots
- Clade: Asterids
- Order: Asterales
- Family: Asteraceae
- Genus: Antennaria
- Species: A. monocephala

Binomial name
- Antennaria monocephala DC. 1838 not (Torr. & A. Gray) Greene 1897

Synonyms
- Synonymy: Antennaria exilis Greene; Antennaria nitens Greene; Antennaria philonipha A.E.Porsild; Antennaria shumaginensis A.E.Porsild; Antennaria angustata Greene, syn of subsp. angustata; Antennaria komarovii Juz. ex Kom., syn of subsp. angustata; Antennaria megacephala Fernald ex Raup, syn of subsp. angustata

= Antennaria monocephala =

Species of flowering plant

Antennaria monocephala, the pygmy pussytoes, is a flowering plant in the family Asteraceae. It is native to arctic and alpine regions of North America (Greenland, Labrador, Quebec, the three Canadian Arctic Territories, Alaska, British Columbia, Alberta, and Wyoming) as well as the Chukotka (Chukchi) Peninsula of Russia.

Antennaria monocephala is a small herb rarely more than 15 cm (6 inches) tall. Male and female flowers are borne on separate plants; some populations are known in which all the individuals are female.

Subspecies

- Antennaria monocephala subsp. angustata (Greene) Hultén
- Antennaria monocephala subsp. monocephala
