= Antennaria friesiana =

Species of flowering plant

== Description ==
Antennaria friesiana
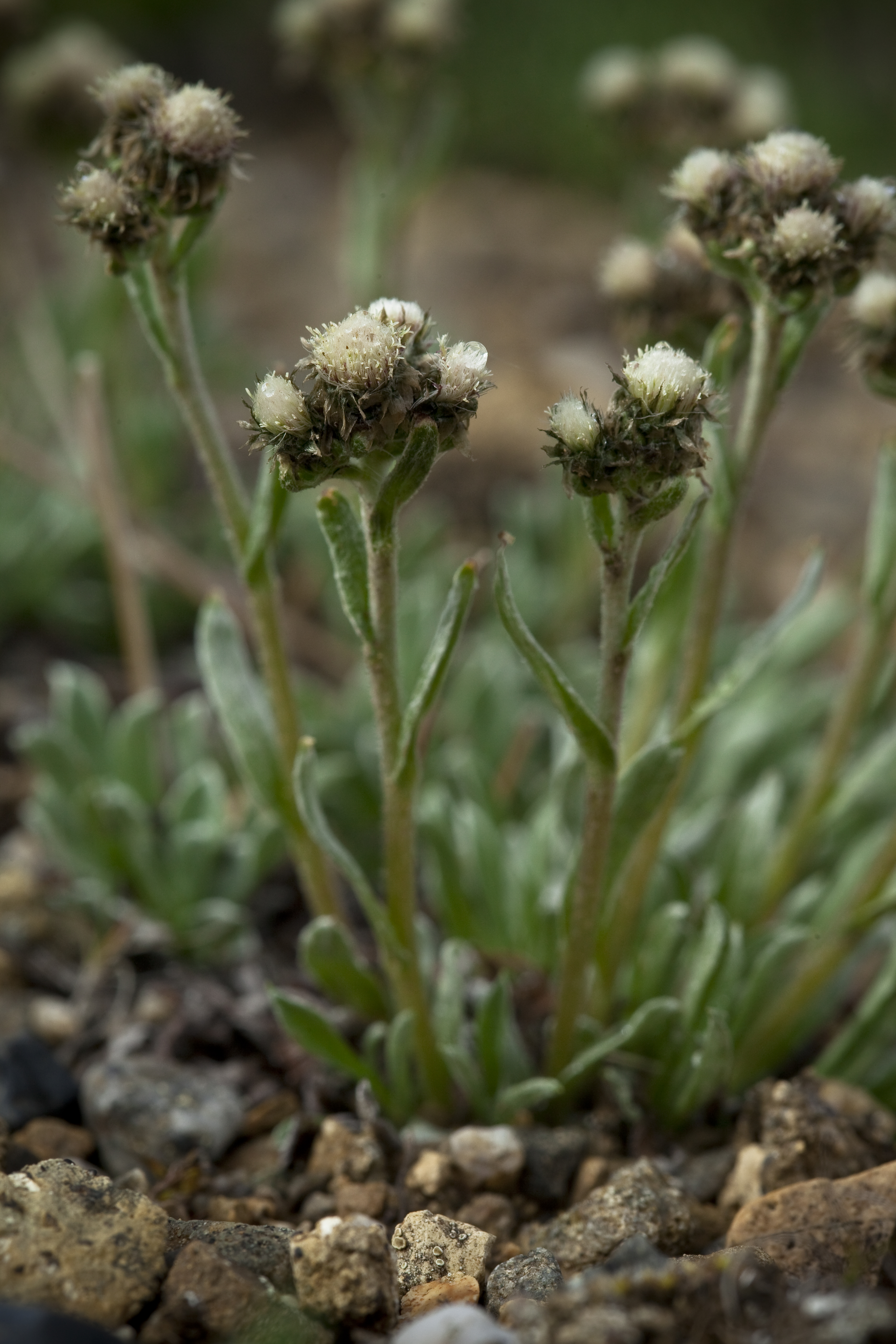
- Antennaria friesiana in Denali National Park and Preserve, USA in 2012

Scientific classification
- Kingdom: Plantae
- Clade: Tracheophytes
- Clade: Angiosperms
- Clade: Eudicots
- Clade: Asterids
- Order: Asterales
- Family: Asteraceae
- Genus: Antennaria
- Species: A. friesiana

Binomial name
- Antennaria friesiana (Trautv.) E.Ekman

Synonyms
- Antennaria alpina var. friesiana Trautv.; Antennaria angustifolia Ekman 1927 not Rydb. 1899; Antennaria ekmaniana A.E.Porsild; Antennaria alaskana Malte, syn of subsp. alaskana; Antennaria beringensis (V.V.Petrovsky) Barkalov, syn of subsp. beringensis; Antennaria neoalaskana A.E.Porsild, syn of subsp. neoalaskana

Antennaria friesiana, commonly called Fries' pussytoes, is an arctic and subarctic species of plants in the family Asteraceae. It has a circumboreal distribution, naturally occurring across the northern regions of Asia and North America, including Russia, Alaska, Northwest Territories, Yukon, Nunavut, Quebec, Labrador, and Greenland.

== Leaves ==
Typical leaf dimensions range from 1.25 to 3 inches long (3.2–7.6 cm) and about ⅓ inches wide (0.8 cm). The species produces rosettes of basal leaves that grow at ground level, sometimes with a few smaller leaves appearing along flowering stems. Their leaves are thin, linear to spatulate (spoon-shaped), and lack teeth on the edges. They also have rounded tips that generally curl slightly inward. The leaves taper into short, winged stalks and are herbaceous rather than succulent. Basal leaves generally persist for one season before undergoing senescence, where they shrivel and disintegrate.

Leaf surfaces are densely covered in dense white hairs (trichomes) that create a soft, velvety texture and silvery-gray appearance. Most species in this genus display 3-5 prominent veins, especially visible on the underside. The lower leaf surface appears bright silvery-white due to dense hairs, also known as trichomes, while the upper surface is gray-green with thinner hair coverage. Trichomes help reduce water loss and reflect excess sunlight in the dry, open habitats where this species grows.

== Flowers ==
The flowers are soft, fuzzy, and white with no noticeable fragrance. The rounded, felt-like flower heads resemble the appearance of a cat’s paw, giving rise to the common name “Pussytoes”. Staminate flowers contain brown tubular anthers, while pistillate flowers are bright white and fluffy with numerous styles.

This plant generally flowers in mid-spring and the event lasts for two to three weeks. Each plant produces three to six flowerheads measuring approximately ¼ - ½ inch (0.64–1.27 cm) in length . The phyllaries (floral bracts) located at the base of each head are light green and hairy, while the central disk florets are bright white. Trichomes (small hairs) on the flowers also deter herbivory and reduce water loss.

== Roots ==
This species also exhibits a rhizomatous root system combining a main taproot with fibrous lateral roots and adventitious roots near the soil surface. Rhizomes allow plants to spread laterally, anchor into the soil, and colonize open ground quickly. These symbiotic associations help the plant survive in nutrient-poor environmental conditions.

Antennaria species form arbuscular mycorrhizal (AM) symbioses with fungi in the phylum, Glomeromycota, enhancing nutrient uptake, phosphorus access, water absorption, and stress tolerance.

== Reproduction ==
Antennaria friesiana exhibits a wide range of reproductive strategies across its range. Individual plants are typically dioecious, producing either male (staminate) or female (pistillate) flower heads, though some subspecies may be gynoecious, producing only female flowers. Many Arctic populations reproduce asexually, forming clonal colonies in which all plants may be entirely male or entirely female. Asexual reproduction occurs through rhizomes or stolons, which take root near the parent plant, with populations containing an average of 3.2 clones per population. This species also exhibits substantial ploidy variation, including diploids, autopolyploids, and segmental allopolyploids.

== Pollination ==
Pussytoes are pollinated by a variety of small insects including flies, bees, moths, and butterflies. These insects visit flower heads for pollen and nectar. The plant’s open, disk-shaped florets are accessible to a wide range of pollinators.

Wind pollination may also occur, particularly in dense colonies and exposed habitats. Cross-pollination is common, however, where pollinators are limited, vegetative reproduction allows colonies to persist.

== Ecology ==
Antennaria species form arbuscular mycorrhizal (AM) symbioses with fungi in the phylum, Glomeromycota, enhancing nutrient uptake, phosphorus access, water absorption, and stress tolerance.

The combination of rhizomatous growth and mycorrhizal symbioses enables the species to occupy rocky slopes, tundra soils, and disturbed sites in northern regions. These are not easy environments to survive, which presents the resilience that pussytoes require to sustain itself in the arctic.

Subspecies

Classification of this and related species is still a subject of discussion, but The Plant List maintained by Kew Botanic Gardens in London recognizes four subspecies:

- Antennaria friesiana subsp. alaskana (Malte) Hultén – Alaska, Yukon, Northwest Territories
- Antennaria friesiana subsp. beringensis V.V.Petrovsky – Russian Far East
- Antennaria friesiana subsp. friesiana – most of species range
- Antennaria friesiana subsp. neoalaskana (A.E.Porsild) R.J.Bayer & Stebbins – Brooks Range in Alaska; Richardson Mountains + MacKenzie Mountains in Canada
