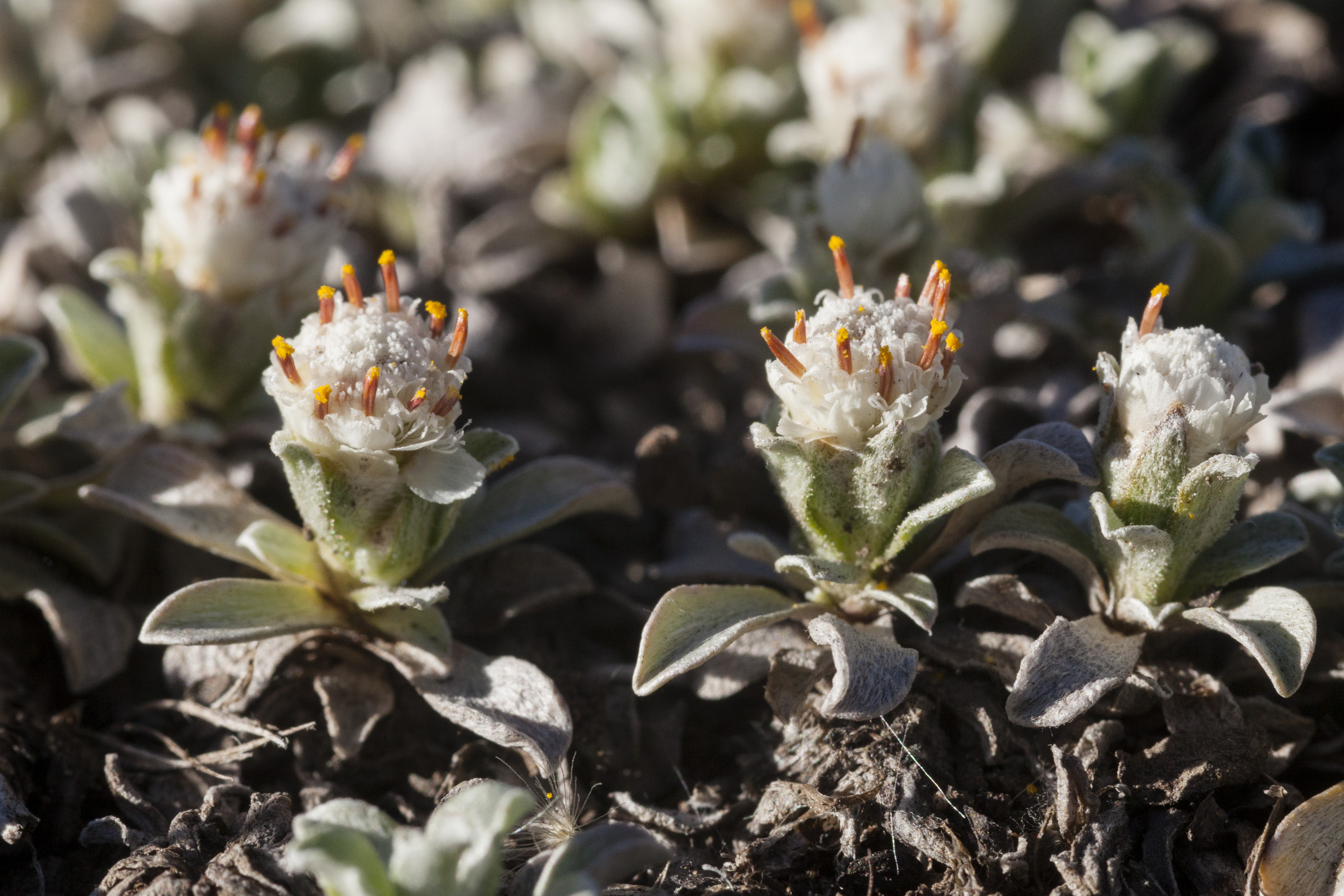

Conservation status
- Apparently Secure (NatureServe)

Scientific classification
- Kingdom: Plantae
- Clade: Tracheophytes
- Clade: Angiosperms
- Clade: Eudicots
- Clade: Asterids
- Order: Asterales
- Family: Asteraceae
- Genus: Antennaria
- Species: A. rosulata

Binomial name
- Antennaria rosulata Rydb.

Synonyms
- Antennaria bakeri Greene; Antennaria sierrae-blancae Rydb.

= Antennaria rosulata =

Species of flowering plant

Antennaria rosulata is a North American species of flowering plant in the family Asteraceae known by the common name Kaibab pussytoes or woolly pussytoes. It is native to the Southwestern United States, in the states of Arizona, New Mexico, Colorado, and Utah.

Antennaria rosulata is a very small plant rarely growing more than 1 inch (2.5 cm) from the ground, spreading by means of horizontal stems running along the surface of the ground. Flower heads are generally borne one at a time, with male and female flowers on separate plants. The foliage is covered with silvery-gray hairs. It generally grows at low altitudes in the mountains, very often with big sagebrush, Artemisia tridentata.
