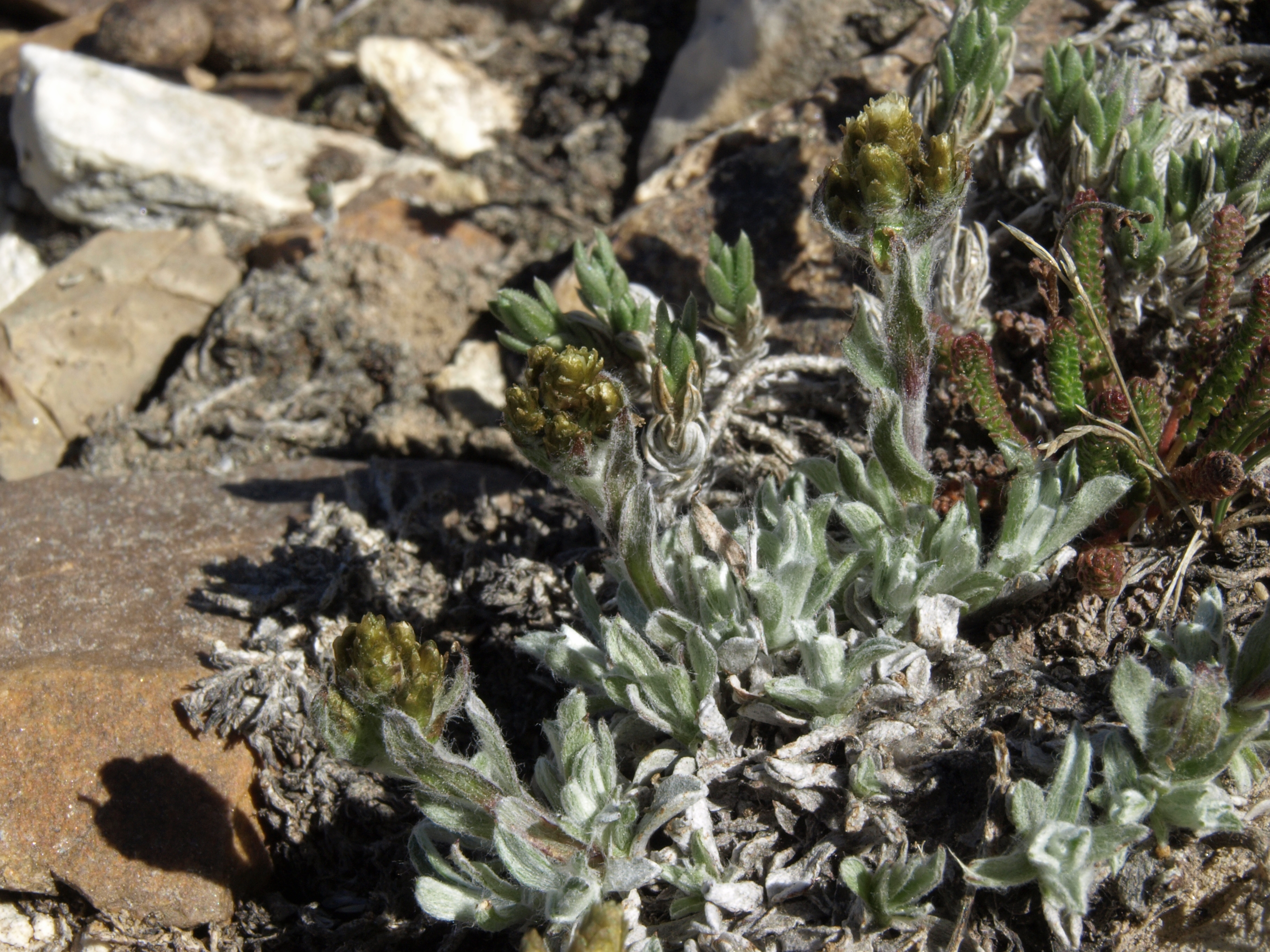

Conservation status
- Secure (NatureServe)

Scientific classification
- Kingdom: Plantae
- Clade: Tracheophytes
- Clade: Angiosperms
- Clade: Eudicots
- Clade: Asterids
- Order: Asterales
- Family: Asteraceae
- Genus: Antennaria
- Species: A. media

Binomial name
- Antennaria media Greene

Synonyms
- Antennaria austromontana E.E.Nelson; Antennaria candida Greene; Antennaria densa Greene; Antennaria gormanii H.St.John; Antennaria modesta Greene; Antennaria mucronata E.E.Nelson

= Antennaria media =

Species of flowering plant

Antennaria media is a North American species of flowering plants in the family Asteraceae known by the common name Rocky Mountain pussytoes. It is native to western Canada and the Western United States from Alaska and Yukon Territory to California to New Mexico. It grows in cold Arctic and alpine regions, either at high latitudes in the Arctic or at high elevations in the mountains (Rocky Mountains, Cascades, Sierra Nevada).

Antennaria media is a perennial herb forming a matted patch of stolons and woolly basal leaves with inflorescences no more than about 13 centimeters tall. The inflorescences contain several flower heads. The species is dioecious, with male and female flowers on different plants. The fruit is an achene up to about 6 millimeters long, most of which is the long, soft pappus.

== Subspecies ==
There are several subspecies; one subspecies is diploid and reproduces sexually and the others are polyploid and display apomixis.
