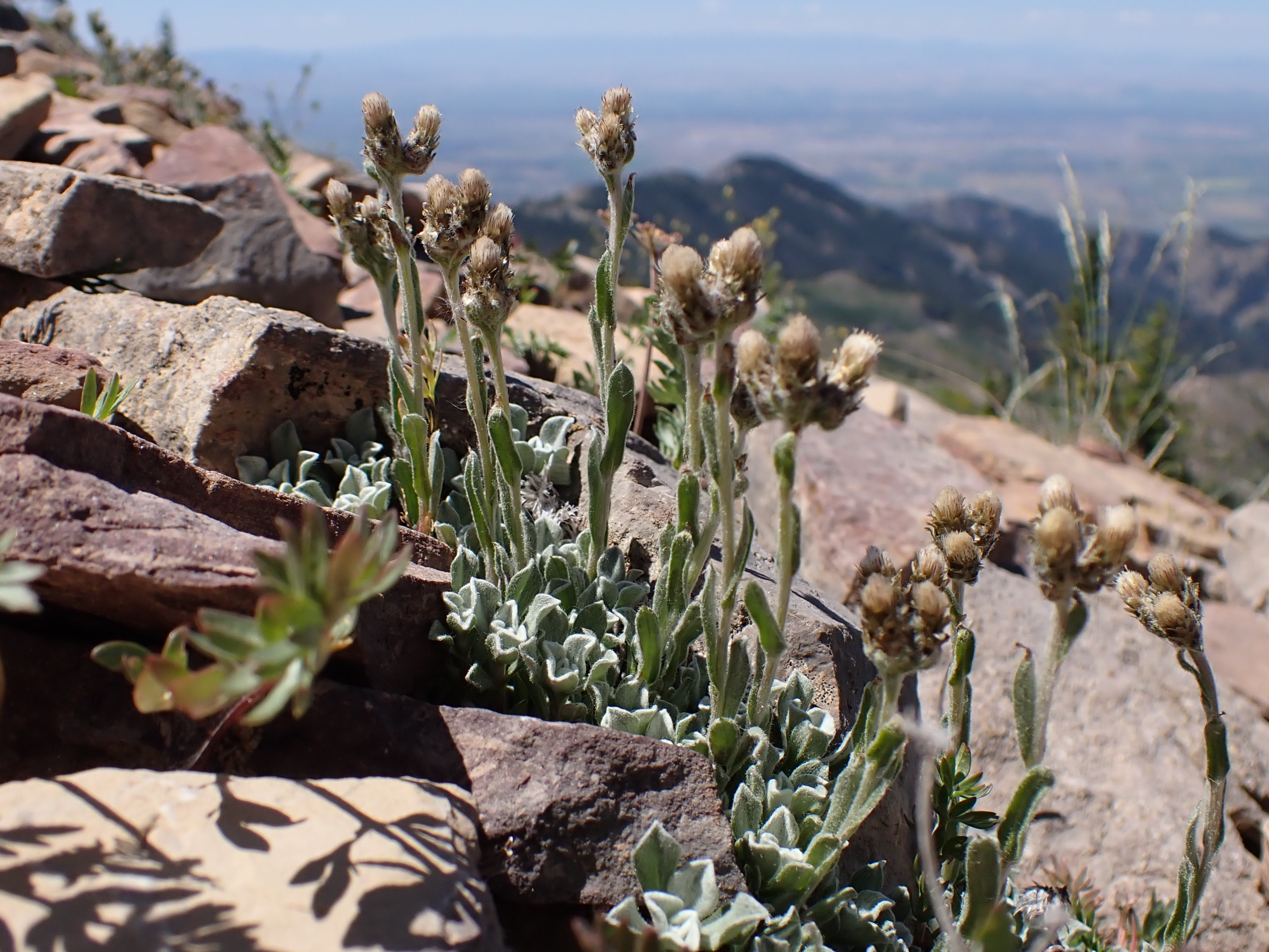

Scientific classification
- Kingdom: Plantae
- Clade: Tracheophytes
- Clade: Angiosperms
- Clade: Eudicots
- Clade: Asterids
- Order: Asterales
- Family: Asteraceae
- Genus: Antennaria
- Species: A. aromatica

Binomial name
- Antennaria aromatica Evert

= Antennaria aromatica =

Species of flowering plant

Antennaria aromatica, the scented pussytoes, is a North American species of plants in the family Asteraceae. It is native to the Rocky Mountains of Alberta, Montana, Idaho, and Wyoming. The crushed foliage has a strong scent resembling that of citronella.
