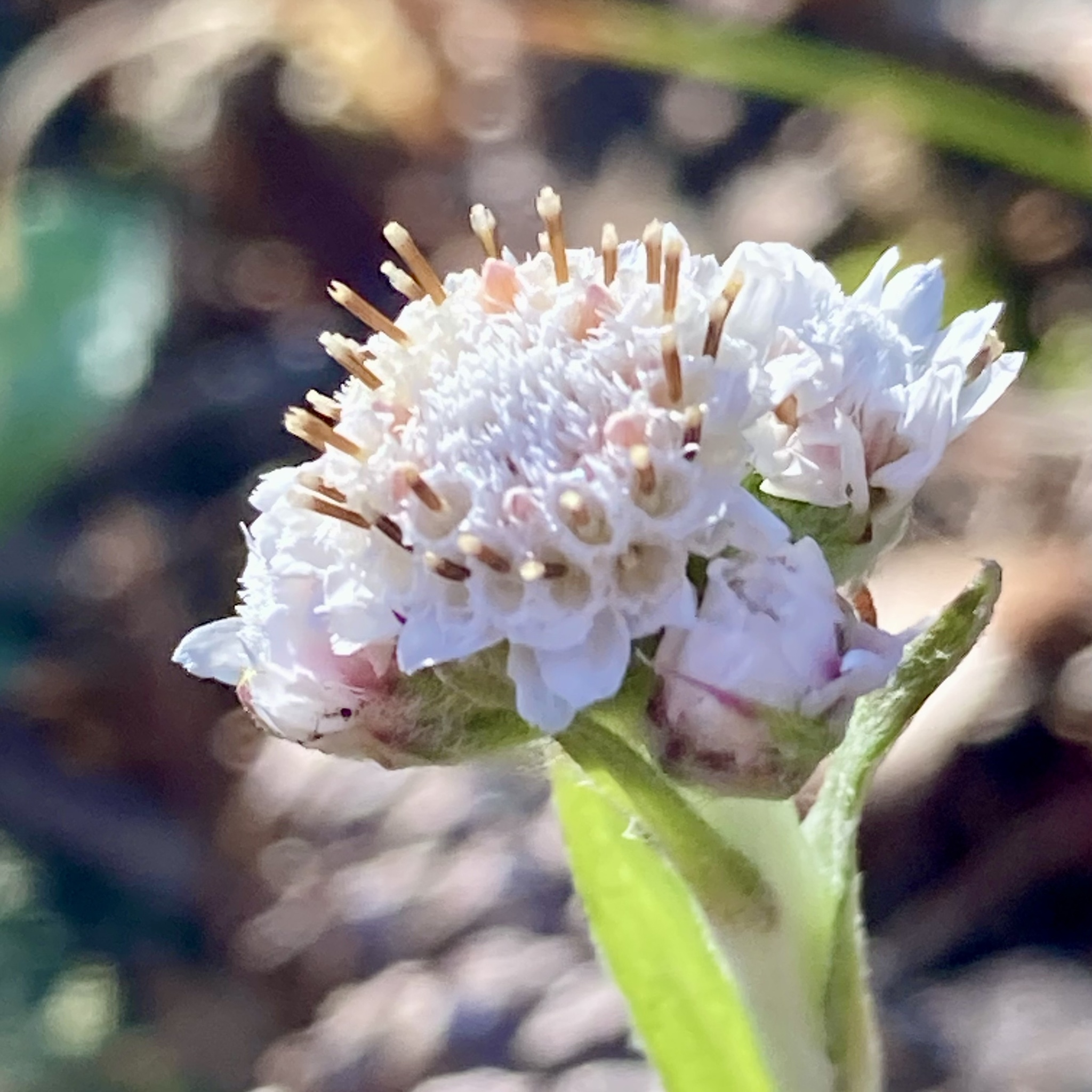

Scientific classification
- Kingdom: Plantae
- Clade: Tracheophytes
- Clade: Angiosperms
- Clade: Eudicots
- Clade: Asterids
- Order: Asterales
- Family: Asteraceae
- Genus: Antennaria
- Species: A. solitaria

Binomial name
- Antennaria solitaria Rydb.

Synonyms
- Antennaria monocephala (Torr. & A.Gray) Greene 1897, illegitimate homonym not DC. 1838 [Illegitimate]; Antennaria plantaginifolia var. monocephala Torr. & A.Gray 1843

= Antennaria solitaria =

Species of flowering plant

Antennaria solitaria is a North American species of flowering plant in the family Asteraceae known by the common name singlehead pussytoes. It is found in the southeastern and east-central part of the United States from Delaware and southern Pennsylvania west to southern Illinois and south as far as Georgia and Louisiana.

Antennaria solitaria sometimes grows up to 35 cm (14 inches) in height. Flower heads are borne singly rather than in arrays of several heads. Male and female flowers are on separate plants. The species tends to grow on slopes or streambanks in moist, rich forests.
