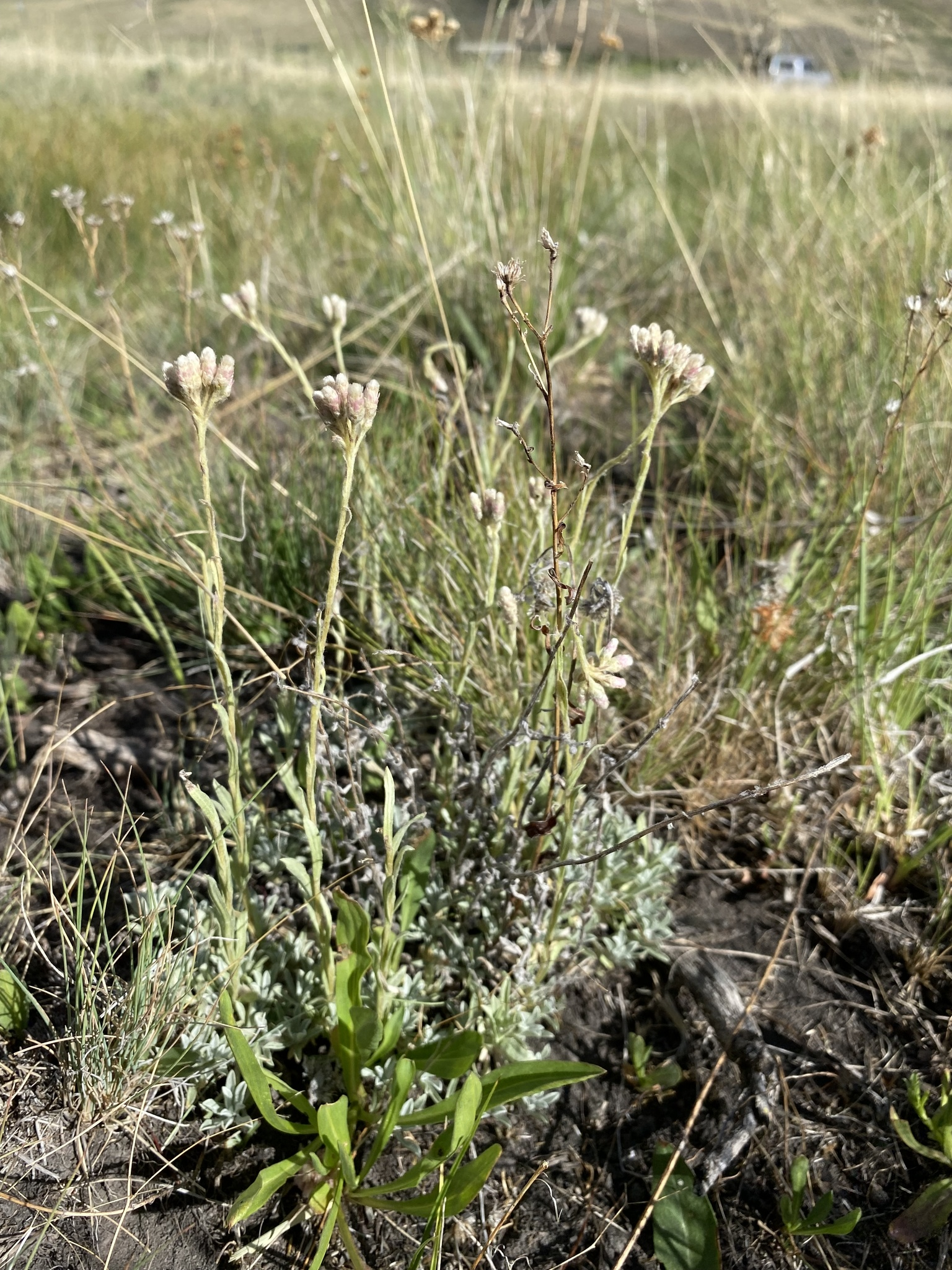

Conservation status
- Vulnerable (NatureServe)

Scientific classification
- Kingdom: Plantae
- Clade: Tracheophytes
- Clade: Angiosperms
- Clade: Eudicots
- Clade: Asterids
- Order: Asterales
- Family: Asteraceae
- Genus: Antennaria
- Species: A. arcuata

Binomial name
- Antennaria arcuata Cronquist

= Antennaria arcuata =

Species of flowering plant

Antennaria arcuata, the box pussytoes, is a North American species of plants in the family Asteraceae. It grows in the western part of the United States, in the States of Idaho (Blaine County), Wyoming (Fremont + Sublette Counties), and Nevada (Elko County).
