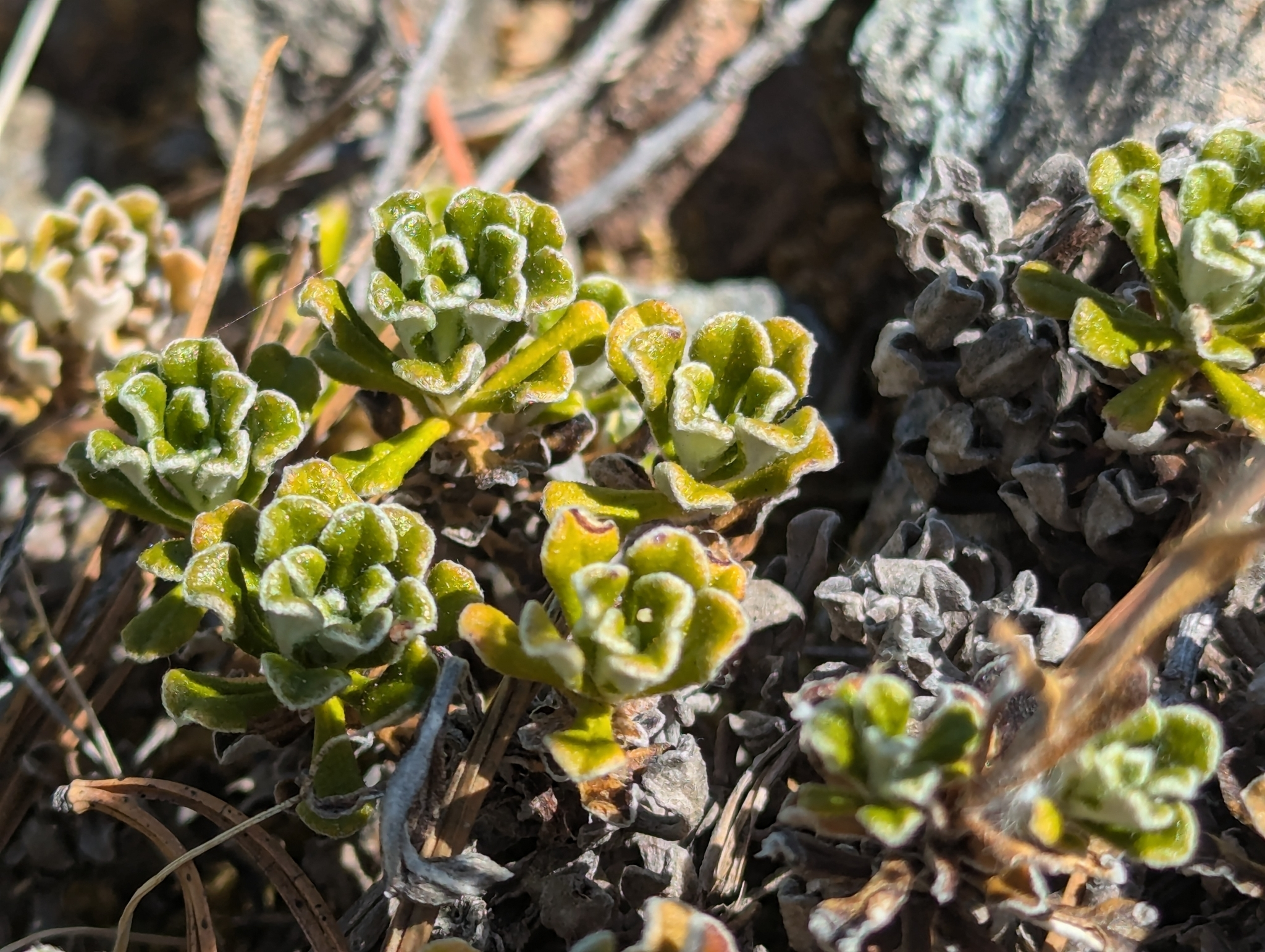

Scientific classification
- Kingdom: Plantae
- Clade: Tracheophytes
- Clade: Angiosperms
- Clade: Eudicots
- Clade: Asterids
- Order: Asterales
- Family: Asteraceae
- Genus: Antennaria
- Species: A. suffrutescens

Binomial name
- Antennaria suffrutescens Greene

= Antennaria suffrutescens =

Species of flowering plant

Antennaria suffrutescens is a species of flowering plant in the family Asteraceae known by the common names evergreen pussytoes and evergreen everlasting. It is native to southwestern Oregon (Curry + Josephine Counties) and far northeastern California (Humboldt + Del Norte Counties). It grows in coniferous forests in the mountains, sometimes on serpentine soils.

Antennaria suffrutescens is a perennial herb producing several erect stems up to about 12 centimeters tall from a woody base. The densely packed leaves at the base of the plant are spoon-shaped with notched tips, woolly on the undersides and about a centimeter long. They are evergreen, remaining on the plant through the seasons. The inflorescence atop each stem bears a single flower head lined with woolly white phyllaries with yellow-green bases. The species is dioecious, meaning that male and female flower heads are borne on separate plants. Female plants bearing slightly larger flower heads containing pistillate flowers, and male plants producing staminate flowers. The fruit is an achene up to a centimeter long, most of which is a long pappus attached to a small hard body.
