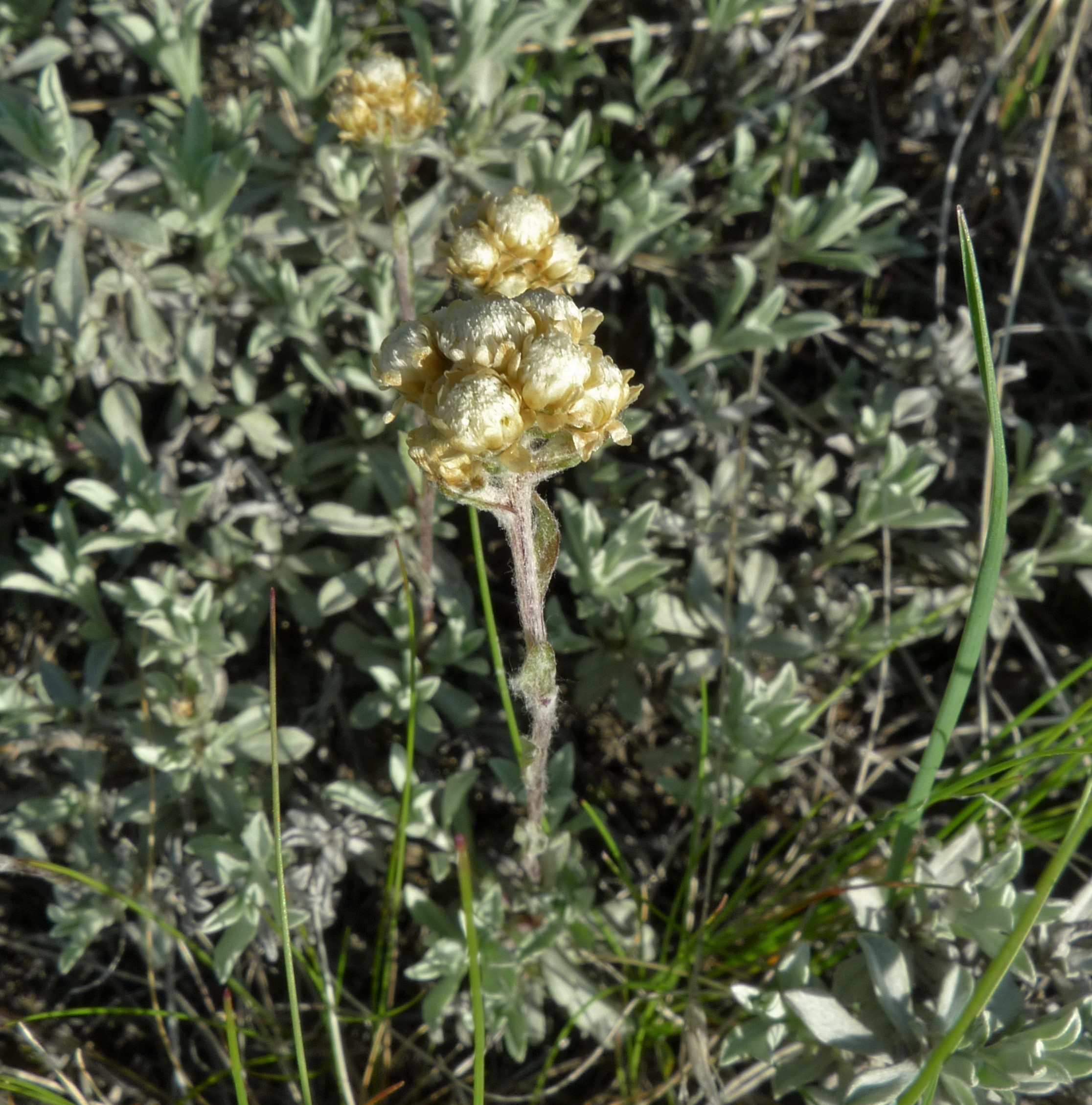
- Antennaria umbrinella on Badger Mountain, Douglas County Washington

Conservation status
- Secure (NatureServe)

Scientific classification
- Kingdom: Plantae
- Clade: Tracheophytes
- Clade: Angiosperms
- Clade: Eudicots
- Clade: Asterids
- Order: Asterales
- Family: Asteraceae
- Genus: Antennaria
- Species: A. umbrinella

Binomial name
- Antennaria umbrinella Rydb.

Synonyms
- Antennaria aizoides Greene; Antennaria flavescens Rydb.; Antennaria pulvinata var. albescens E.Nelson; Antennaria reflexa E.E.Nelson

= Antennaria umbrinella =

Species of flowering plant

Antennaria umbrinella is a North American species of flowering plants in the family Asteraceae known by the common names umber pussytoes and brown pussytoes. It is native to southwestern Canada (Saskatchewan, Alberta, British Columbia) and the western United States as far south as Colorado, Coconino County in Arizona, and Tulare County in California). It grows in a variety of habitats at a variety of elevations, from lowland sagebrush steppe to subalpine meadows.

Antennaria umbrinella is a perennial herb growing erect stems to a maximum height around 16 centimeters from a woody base with spreading stolons. The base is covered in woolly leaves each one to two centimeters long and lance-shaped to spoon-shaped. Each inflorescence holds several flower heads with fuzzy phyllaries which are whitish to brown in color. The plant is dioecious, with males and females producing different flower types in the heads. The fruit is an achene with a hard body 2 millimeters long and a long pappus of hairs up to 5 millimeters long.
