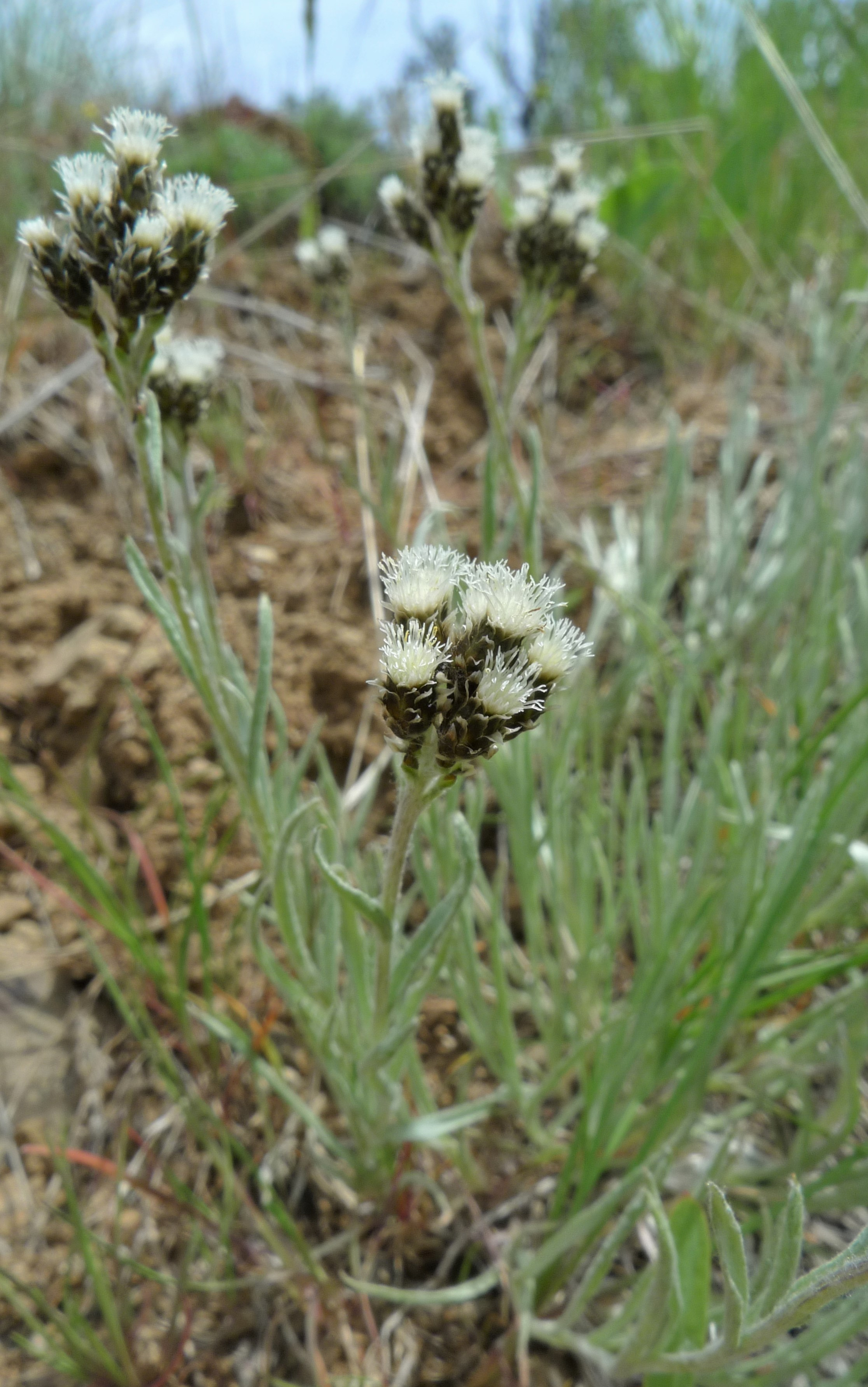
- Antennaria stenophylla in the Wenatchee Mountains, Chelan County Washington

Scientific classification
- Kingdom: Plantae
- Clade: Tracheophytes
- Clade: Angiosperms
- Clade: Eudicots
- Clade: Asterids
- Order: Asterales
- Family: Asteraceae
- Genus: Antennaria
- Species: A. stenophylla

Binomial name
- Antennaria stenophylla (A.Gray) A.Gray

Synonyms
- Antennaria alpina var. stenophylla A.Gray; Antennaria leucophaea Piper

= Antennaria stenophylla =

Species of flowering plant

Antennaria stenophylla is a North American species of flowering plants in the family Asteraceae known by the common name narrowleaf pussytoes. It is native to the Great Basin, Columbia Plateau, and Snake River Plain of the Western United States, in the States of Washington, Oregon, Idaho, Nevada, and Utah.

Antennaria stenophylla is a relatively small plant up to 15 cm (6 inches) tall. Male and female flower heads are on separate plants, with several heads clumped together on each stalk. The species usually grows on hillsides in sagebrush steppes, frequently dominated by sagebrush (Artemisia spp.).
