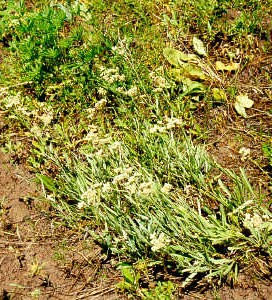

Conservation status
- Secure (NatureServe)

Scientific classification
- Kingdom: Plantae
- Clade: Tracheophytes
- Clade: Angiosperms
- Clade: Eudicots
- Clade: Asterids
- Order: Asterales
- Family: Asteraceae
- Genus: Antennaria
- Species: A. luzuloides

Binomial name
- Antennaria luzuloides Torr. & A.Gray

Synonyms
- Antennaria oblanceolata Rydb.; Antennaria argentea subsp. aberrans E.E.Nelson, syn of subsp. aberrans; Antennaria microcephala A.Gray, syn of subsp. aberrans; Antennaria pyramidata Greene, syn of subsp. aberrans

= Antennaria luzuloides =

Species of flowering plant

Antennaria luzuloides is a North American species of flowering plant in the family Asteraceae known by the common name rush pussytoes. The species is native to western Canada (Alberta, British Columbia) and the western United States (Oregon, Washington, northern California, Idaho, Montana, Nevada, Utah, Colorado, Wyoming, and a few isolated populations in South Dakota).

Antennaria luzuloides is a perennial herb growing greenish white or gray erect stems from a small woody caudex. It reaches a maximum height of about 25 centimeters. There is a basal patch of grayish woolly leaves each a few centimeters long and linear in shape to somewhat spoon-shaped. The inflorescence holds up to 30 rounded flower heads each less than a centimeter wide. The head is lined with narrow, pointed phyllaries. The species is dioecious, with male and female plants producing different flower types. The fruit is an achene up to about 6 millimeters in length including a long, soft pappus.

Subspecies

- Antennaria luzuloides subsp. luzuloides – most of species range
- Antennaria luzuloides subsp. aberrans (E.E.Nelson) R.J.Bayer & Stebbins – California, Nevada, Oregon
