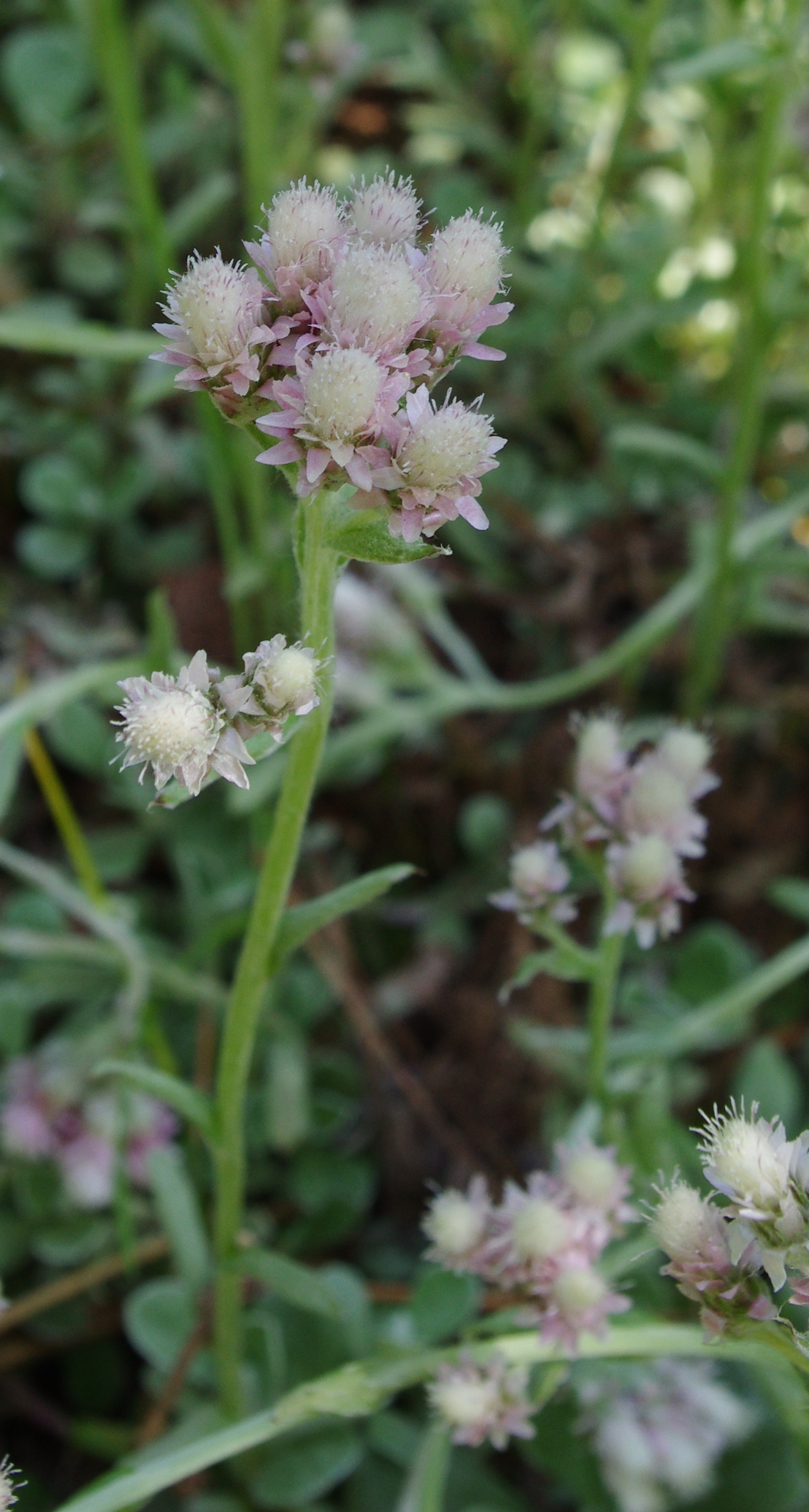

Conservation status
- Secure (NatureServe)

Scientific classification
- Kingdom: Plantae
- Clade: Tracheophytes
- Clade: Angiosperms
- Clade: Eudicots
- Clade: Asterids
- Order: Asterales
- Family: Asteraceae
- Genus: Antennaria
- Species: A. neglecta

Binomial name
- Antennaria neglecta Greene

Synonyms
- Synonymy: Antennaria angustiarum Lunell; Antennaria athabascensis 'Greene; Antennaria campestris Rydb.; Antennaria chelonica Lunell; Antennaria erosa Greene; Antennaria longifolia Greene; Antennaria lunellii Greene; Antennaria nebrascensis Greene; Antennaria parvula Greene; Antennaria wilsonii Greene

= Antennaria neglecta =

Species of flowering plant

Antennaria neglecta is a North American species of flowering plants in the family Asteraceae known by the common name field pussytoes. It is widespread across much of Canada (including Northwest Territories plus all provinces except Newfoundland and Labrador) as well as the northeastern and north-central United States.

Antennaria neglecta is an herb up to 25 cm (10 inches) tall with as many as 8 flowering heads per plant. Male and female flowers are borne on separate plants, some populations being composed entirely of female plants.
