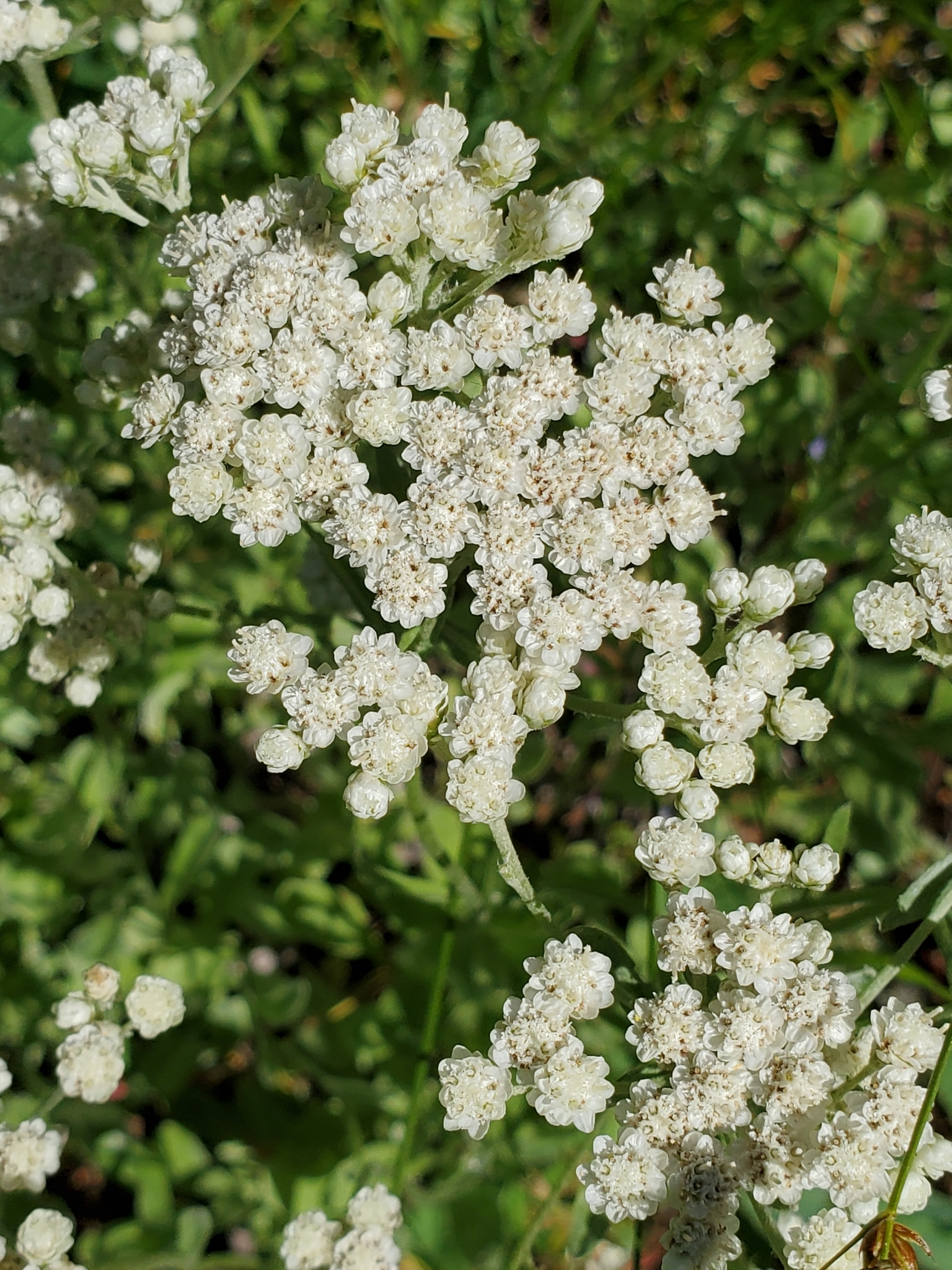

Conservation status
- Apparently Secure (NatureServe)

Scientific classification
- Kingdom: Plantae
- Clade: Tracheophytes
- Clade: Angiosperms
- Clade: Eudicots
- Clade: Asterids
- Order: Asterales
- Family: Asteraceae
- Genus: Antennaria
- Species: A. argentea

Binomial name
- Antennaria argentea Benth.

Synonyms
- Antennaria luzuloides var. argentea (Benth.) A.Gray

= Antennaria argentea =

Species of flowering plant

Antennaria argentea is a North American species of flowering plants in the family Asteraceae known by the common name silver pussytoes or silvery everlasting. It is native primarily to Oregon and to northern and central California with additional populations in Nevada, Idaho, Montana, and Washington.

Antennaria argentea grows in dry coniferous forests. This is a perennial herb forming a basal patch of woolly grayish oval-shaped leaves a few centimeters long and many slender erect stems up to 40 centimeters tall. It is dioecious, with male and female plants producing different types of flowers. Both flower types are clustered in many flower heads with whitish phyllaries. The female plants produce fruits which are achenes with a soft pappus a few millimeters long.
