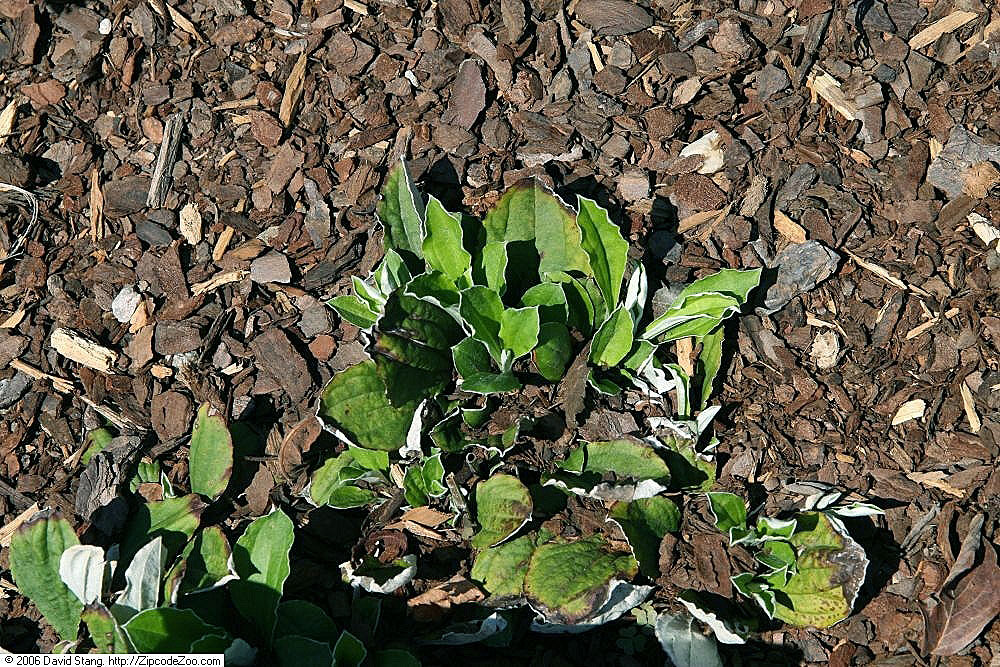

Conservation status
- Secure (NatureServe)

Scientific classification
- Kingdom: Plantae
- Clade: Tracheophytes
- Clade: Angiosperms
- Clade: Eudicots
- Clade: Asterids
- Order: Asterales
- Family: Asteraceae
- Genus: Antennaria
- Species: A. parlinii

Binomial name
- Antennaria parlinii Fernald

Subspecies
- A. parlinii subsp. parlinii; A. parlinii subsp. fallax

Synonyms
- Synonymy of subsp. parlinii: Antennaria arnoglossa Greene; Antennaria parlinii var. arnoglossa (Greene) Fernald; Antennaria plantaginifolia var. arnoglossa (Greene) Cronquist; Antennaria propinqua Greene; Synonymy of subsp. fallax: Antennaria fallax Greene; Antennaria parlinii var. fallax (Greene) B.L.Turner; Antennaria ambigens Fernald; Antennaria ampla Bush; Antennaria arkansana Greene; Antennaria arnoglossa var. ambigens Greene; Antennaria bifrons Greene; Antennaria brainerdii Fernald; Antennaria calophylla Greene; Antennaria elliptica Greene; Antennaria fallax var. calophylla Fernald; Antennaria farwellii Greene; Antennaria greenei Bush; Antennaria mesochora Greene; Antennaria munda Fernald; Antennaria occidentalis Greene; Antennaria parlinii var. ambigens Fernald; Antennaria parlinii var. farwellii (Greene) B.Boivin; Antennaria plantaginifolia var. ambigens (Greene) Cronquist; Antennaria umbellata Greene

= Antennaria parlinii =

Species of flowering plant

Antennaria parlinii, known as Parlin's pussytoes, is a herbaceous flowering plant in the family Asteraceae. Like other species in the genus, the plant is dioecious. It is widespread across eastern and central Canada and eastern and central United States, from Manitoba to Nova Scotia south as far as Texas and Georgia.

== Description ==
Antennaria parlinii is an herb up to 45 centimetres (18 in) tall. Male and female flowers are borne on separate plants (also known as dioecy); in some populations all the plants are female. White flowers bloom April to June, with 4 to 12 or more flowerheads on a cluster at the top of the stems. The common name refers to the resemblance of the flowers to the toes of a cat. The basal leaves are 2.5–9.5 centimetres (1–3.75 in) long and up to 4.4 centimetres (1.75 in) wide. A. parlinii is very similar to the species Antennaria plantaginifolia (plantain leaf pussytoes), although the flowers of A. parlinii are larger.

== Distribution and habitat ==
This species is found in Canada (Manitoba, Ontario, Quebec, New Brunswick, Nova Scotia) and the United States (entirety of the Central United States and Eastern United States except for Florida). It grows in dry, rocky areas in full sun to partial shade. It prefers acid soil.

== Conservation ==
As of December 2024, the conservation group NatureServe listed Antennaria parlinii as Secure (G5) worldwide. This status was last reviewed on 28 August 2023.

At the state and provincial level within Canada and the United States, the species is listed as Secure (S5) in Ontario, Indiana, Pennsylvania; Apparently Secure (S4) in Delaware, North Carolina, Vermont, Virginia, West Virginia; Vulnerable (S3) in Georgia; Imperiled (S2) in Nova Scotia; Critically Imperiled (S1) in New Brunswick and Possibly Extirpated (SH) in Manitoba. The species is not yet assessed in any other state or province across its range.

== Taxonomy ==
Antennaria parlinii was first formally named and described by Merritt Lyndon Fernald in 1897.

=== Etymology ===
The specific epithet, parlinii, was named after John Crawford Parlin who recognized the uniqueness of this species. In English, the species is commonly known as Parlin's pussytoes.

=== Subspecies ===
As of December 2024, Plants of the World Online recognizes two subspecies for this taxon:

- Antennaria parlinii subsp. parlinii autonym
- Antennaria parlinii subsp. fallax (Greene) R.J.Bayer & Stebbins

The two subspecies can be differentiated using the stems and basal leaves. A. p. subsp. fallax has glandless stems and basal leaves that are adaxially tomentose, while A. p. subsp. parlinii has stems with purple, glandular hairs and basal leaves that are adaxially glabrous.
