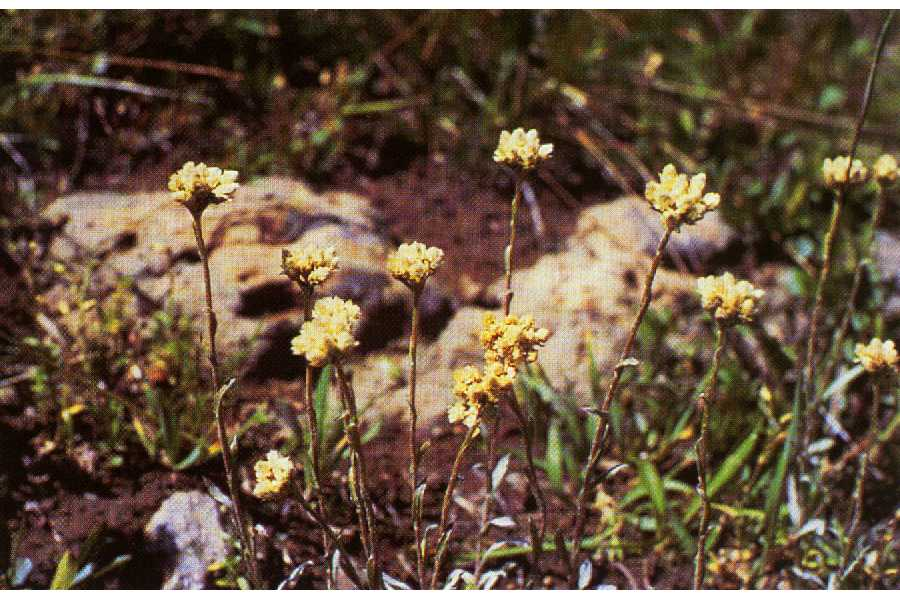

Conservation status
- Secure (NatureServe)

Scientific classification
- Kingdom: Plantae
- Clade: Tracheophytes
- Clade: Angiosperms
- Clade: Eudicots
- Clade: Asterids
- Order: Asterales
- Family: Asteraceae
- Genus: Antennaria
- Species: A. corymbosa

Binomial name
- Antennaria corymbosa E.E.Nelson

Synonyms
- Antennaria acuta Rydb.; Antennaria dioica var. corymbosa (E.E.Nelson) Jeps.; Antennaria hygrophila Greene ex Greene; Antennaria nardina Greene

= Antennaria corymbosa =

Species of flowering plant

Antennaria corymbosa is a North American species of flowering plants in the family Asteraceae known by the common names flat-top pussytoes or meadow pussytoes. It is native to western Canada (British Columbia, Alberta, Saskatchewan) and the Western United States south as far as Tulare County in California and Rio Arriba County in New Mexico. It grows in moist, cool areas such as mountain meadows and riverbanks. Most of the populations are found in the Rocky Mountains, the Cascades, and the Sierra Nevada.

Antennaria corymbosa is a small perennial herb growing from a basal patch of thin, gray, woolly, spoon-shaped leaves one or two centimeters long. It produces several erect stems no more than 15 centimeters tall, each holding an inflorescence of several flower heads. It is dioecious, with male and female plants producing different types of flower heads, which are generally similar in appearance. Each head has a surface of dark-dotted white phyllaries and contains tiny individual flowers. Female flowers yield fruits which are achenes no more than a millimeter long, not counting the soft pappus of 3 or 4 millimeters.
