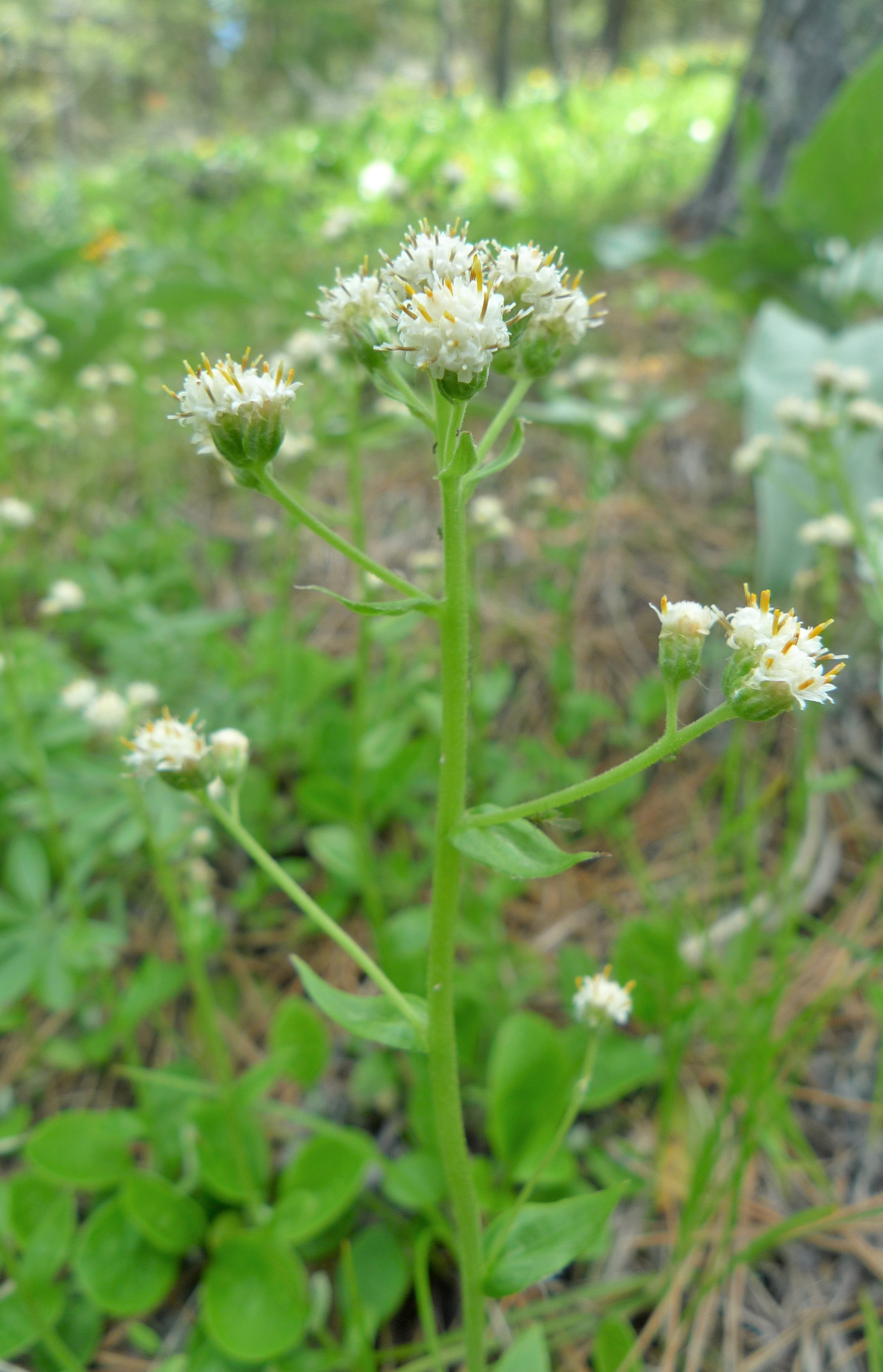
- Antennaria racemosa near Chumstick Mountain, Chelan County Washington

Scientific classification
- Kingdom: Plantae
- Clade: Tracheophytes
- Clade: Angiosperms
- Clade: Eudicots
- Clade: Asterids
- Order: Asterales
- Family: Asteraceae
- Genus: Antennaria
- Species: A. racemosa

Binomial name
- Antennaria racemosa Hook.

Synonyms
- Antennaria petasites Greene; Antennaria piperi Rydb.

= Antennaria racemosa =

Species of flowering plant

Antennaria racemosa is a species of flowering plant in the family Asteraceae known by the common name racemose pussytoes. It is native to western North America from British Columbia and Alberta south as far as northern California and Wyoming. It grows in mountain forests, generally in moist, partially shaded areas, and often colonizes bare patches of mineral-rich soil, including disturbed areas.

Antennaria racemosa is a glandular perennial herb which may be small, woolly, and matted to nearly hairless and erect to heights near 50 cm (20 inches). It forms basal patches of oval-shaped leaves 3 to 10 centimeters long, fuzzy on the undersides and shiny green above. The patches are connected with stolons covered in leaves. The erect stem bears an inflorescence which can be shaped like a raceme and is often dense, especially in higher elevations, containing several flower heads. The species is dioecious, with male and female plants producing different types of flowers in the heads. The fruit is an achene with a body only about a millimeter long attached to a soft pappus up to 7 millimeters long. The pappus catches the wind, which disperses the seed. The plant also reproduces vegetatively via its creeping stolons.
