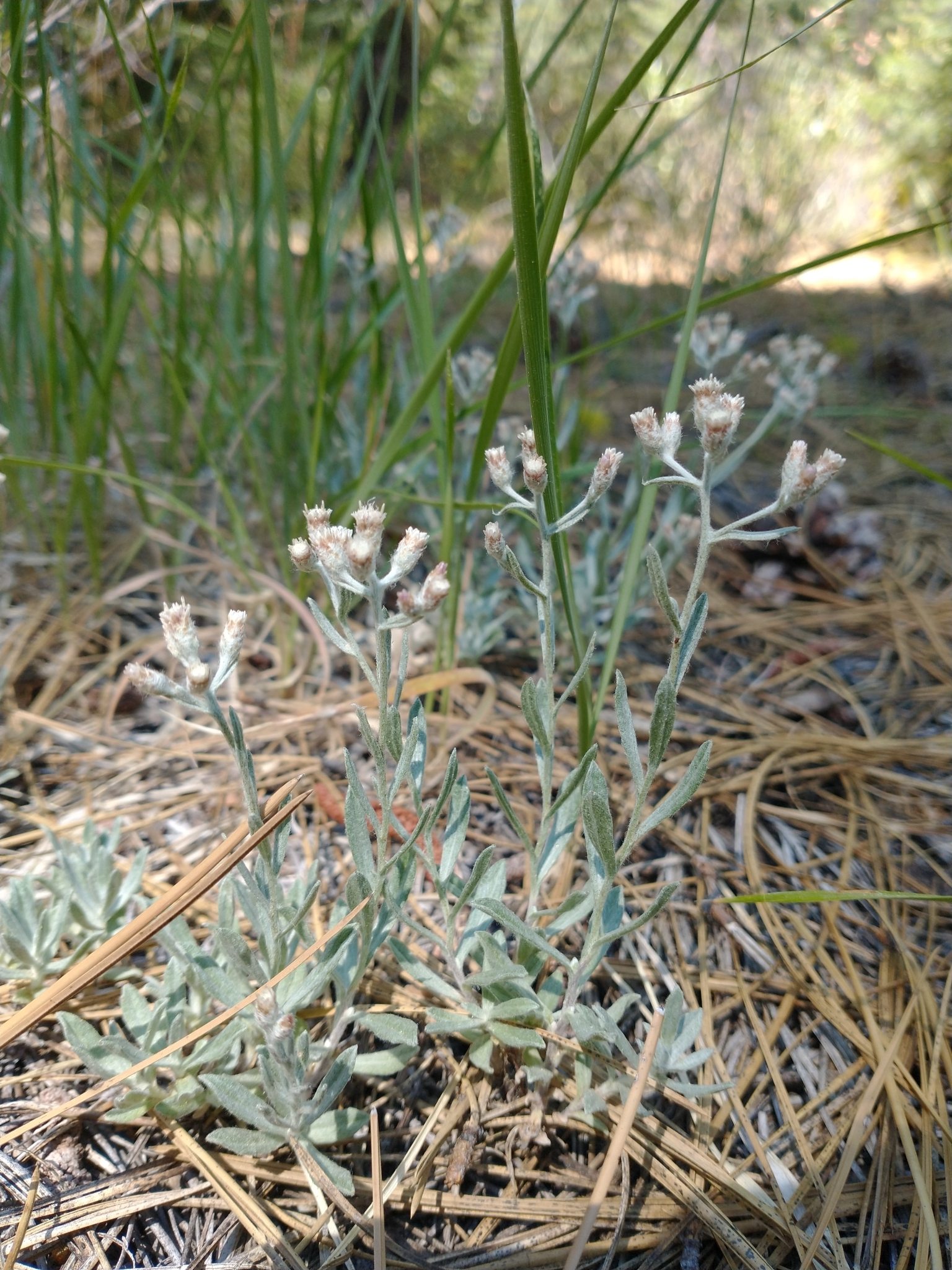

Conservation status
- Secure (NatureServe)

Scientific classification
- Kingdom: Plantae
- Clade: Tracheophytes
- Clade: Angiosperms
- Clade: Eudicots
- Clade: Asterids
- Order: Asterales
- Family: Asteraceae
- Genus: Antennaria
- Species: A. geyeri

Binomial name
- Antennaria geyeri A.Gray

Synonyms
- Gnaphalium alienum Hook. & Arn.

= Antennaria geyeri =

Species of flowering plant

Antennaria geyeri is a North American species of flowering plant in the family Asteraceae known by the common name pinewoods pussytoes or mountain pussytoes. It is native to the western United States where it grows in woodland and scrub very often on the forest floor under pine trees. It is found in Washington, Oregon, northern California, and northwestern Nevada.

Antennaria geyeri is a small perennial herb growing up to about 14 centimeters tall. It produces several erect stems from a branching, woody base, and there is no basal rosette of leaves. The leaves along the stem are lance-shaped, a few centimeters long, and coated in long woolly hairs. The inflorescence bears up to 25 flower heads with coats of woolly white fibers and pink-tipped phyllaries. The species is dioecious, with male plants bearing staminate flowers in their heads and female plants bearing pistillate. The fruit is a hairy achene up to a centimeter long including its long, soft pappus.

The species is named for German botanist Karl Andreas Geyer (1809-1853), who initially discovered the species near Spokane.
