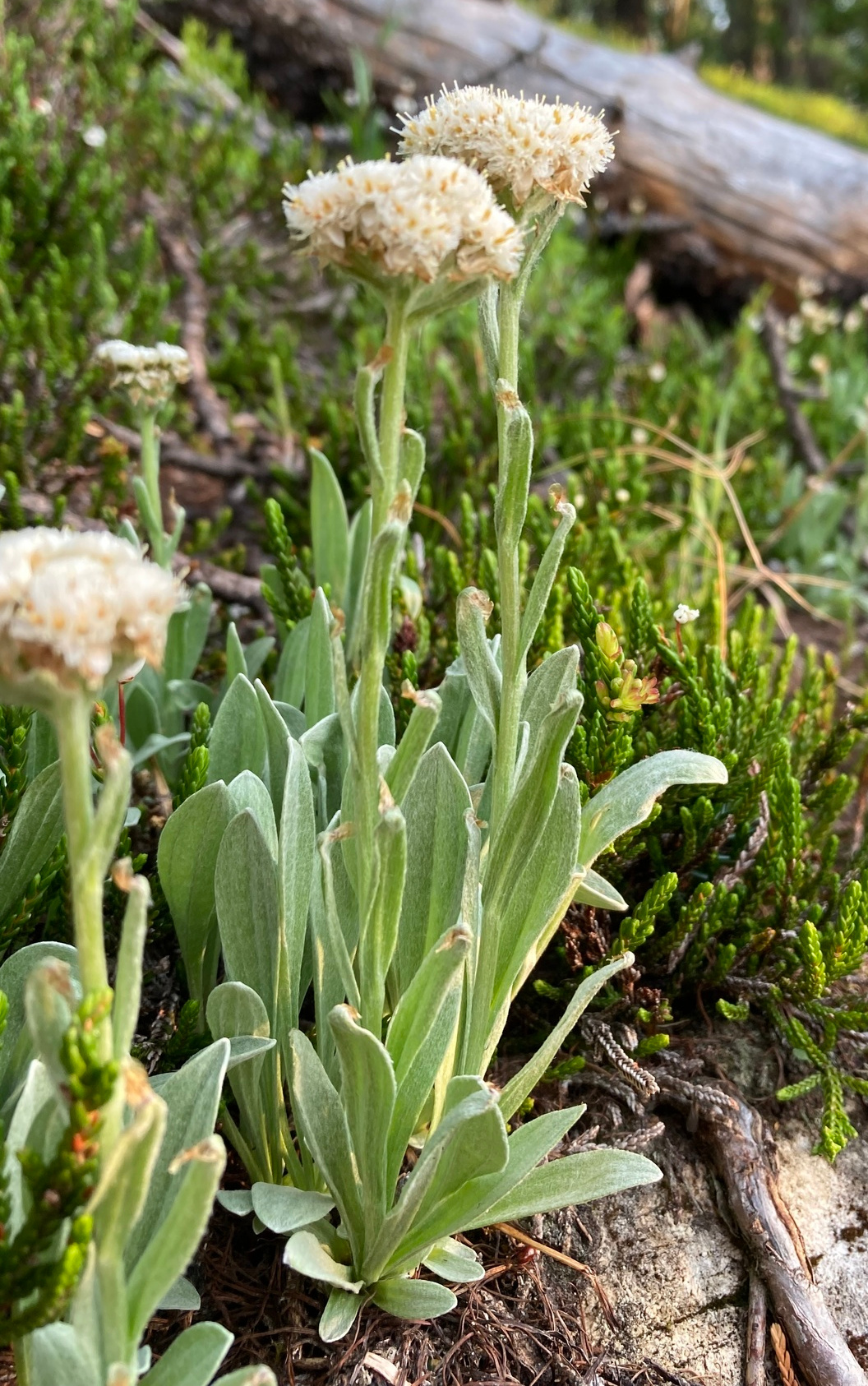

Conservation status
- Secure (NatureServe)

Scientific classification
- Kingdom: Plantae
- Clade: Tracheophytes
- Clade: Angiosperms
- Clade: Eudicots
- Clade: Asterids
- Order: Asterales
- Family: Asteraceae
- Genus: Antennaria
- Species: A. lanata

Binomial name
- Antennaria lanata (Hook.) Greene

Synonyms
- Antennaria carpatica var. lanata Hook.; Antennaria villifera Boriss.

= Antennaria lanata =

Species of flowering plant

Antennaria lanata is a North American species of flowering plant in the family Asteraceae, known by the common name woolly pussytoes. It is native to western Canada (Alberta, British Columbia) and the northwestern United States (Oregon, Washington, Idaho, Montana, Wyoming, Utah, and extreme northern California (Del Norte and Trinity Counties)).

Antennaria lanata is a small herb up to 20 cm (8 inches) tall. Leaves are covered with thick white hairs resembling wool. It is dioecious, meaning that male and female flowers are borne on separate plants. It grows in protected alpine and subalpine sites in mountainous areas.
