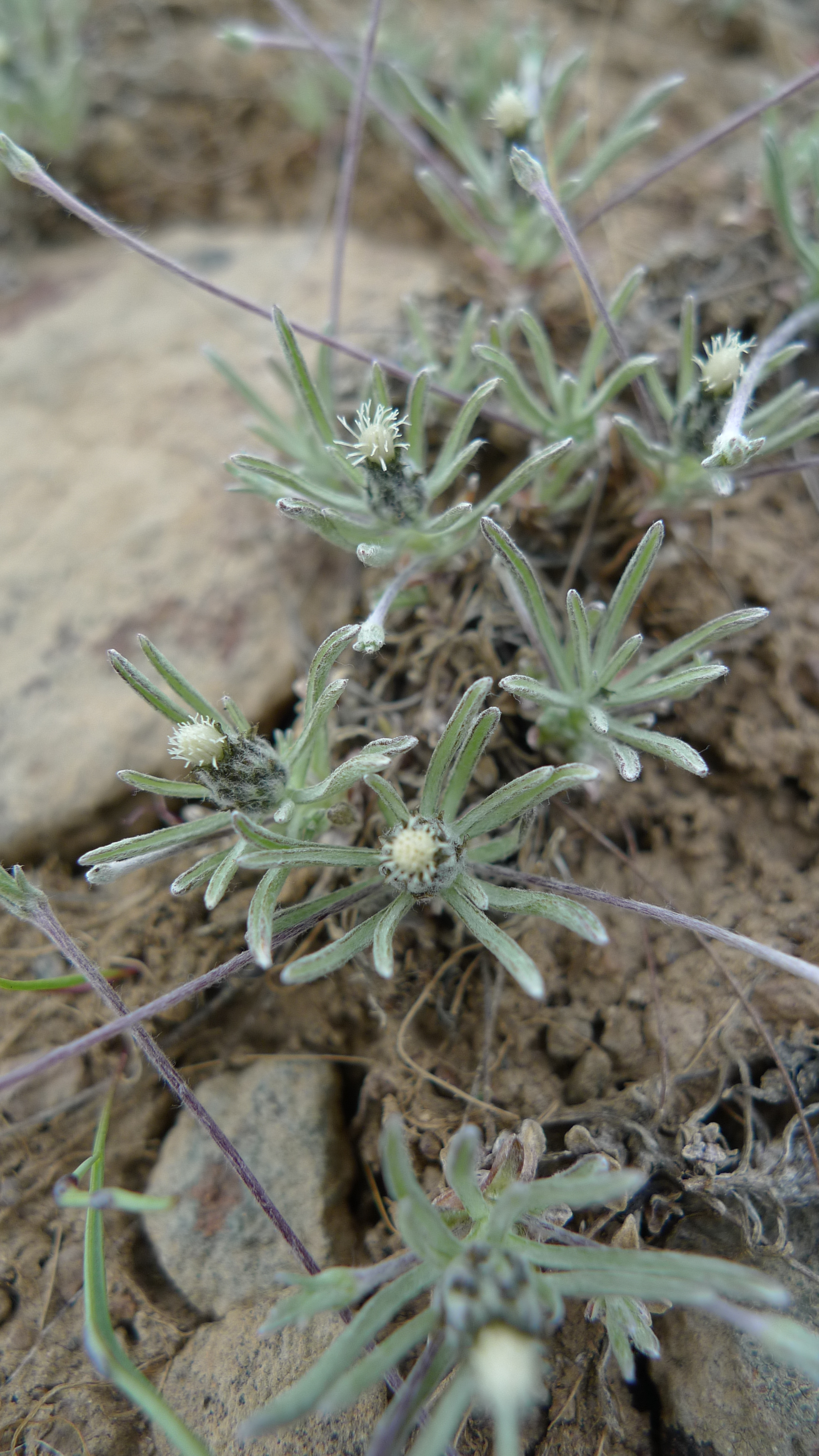
- Antennaria flagellaris on Badger Mountain, Douglas County Washington

Conservation status
- Secure (NatureServe)

Scientific classification
- Kingdom: Plantae
- Clade: Tracheophytes
- Clade: Angiosperms
- Clade: Eudicots
- Clade: Asterids
- Order: Asterales
- Family: Asteraceae
- Genus: Antennaria
- Species: A. flagellaris

Binomial name
- Antennaria flagellaris (A.Gray) A.Gray

Synonyms
- Antennaria dimorpha var. flagellaris A.Gray

= Antennaria flagellaris =

Species of flowering plant

Antennaria flagellaris is a North American species of flowering plant in the family Asteraceae known by the common names whip pussytoes and stoloniferous pussytoes. It is native primarily to the Great Basin and Columbia Plateau regions of Washington, Oregon, Idaho, and northern Nevada (Elko County), where it is a member of the sagebrush scrub plant community. Additional populations are found in northeastern California (Lassen + Modoc Counties), Wyoming (Park + Teton Counties), the Black Hills of South Dakota (Custer County), and the Canadian Province of British Columbia.

Antennaria flagellaris is a petite perennial herb forming a thin patch on the ground no more than 2 centimeters high. It grows from a slender caudex and spreads via thin, wiry, straight stolons. The woolly grayish leaves are one to two centimeters long and generally lance-shaped. The tiny inflorescence holds a single flower head less than a centimeter wide. The species is dioecious, with male plants producing only staminate flowers and female plants producing only pistillate flowers. The fruit is a bumpy achene up to a centimeter long including its long, soft pappus.
