= Antennaria densifolia =

Conservation status
- Apparently Secure (NatureServe)

Scientific classification
- Kingdom: Plantae
- Clade: Tracheophytes
- Clade: Angiosperms
- Clade: Eudicots
- Clade: Asterids
- Order: Asterales
- Family: Asteraceae
- Genus: Antennaria
- Species: A. densifolia

Binomial name
- Antennaria densifolia A.E.Porsild

Synonyms
- Antennaria ellyae A.E.Porsild

Species of flowering plant

Antennaria densifolia, the denseleaf pussytoes, is a North American species of plants in the family Asteraceae. It is native to western Canada (Northwest Territories, Yukon, British Columbia, Alberta) and the US states of Alaska and Montana. It grows in subalpine-alpine limestone talus.
