= Schinia verna =

Scientific classification
- Domain: Eukaryota
- Kingdom: Animalia
- Phylum: Arthropoda
- Class: Insecta
- Order: Lepidoptera
- Superfamily: Noctuoidea
- Family: Noctuidae
- Genus: Schinia
- Species: S. verna

Binomial name
- Schinia verna Hardwick, 1983

Species of moth

Schinia verna, or the Verna's flower moth, is a moth of the family Noctuidae. It is found in Alberta, Saskatchewan and Manitoba.

The wingspan is approximately 20 mm.

The larvae feed on Antennaria species.
