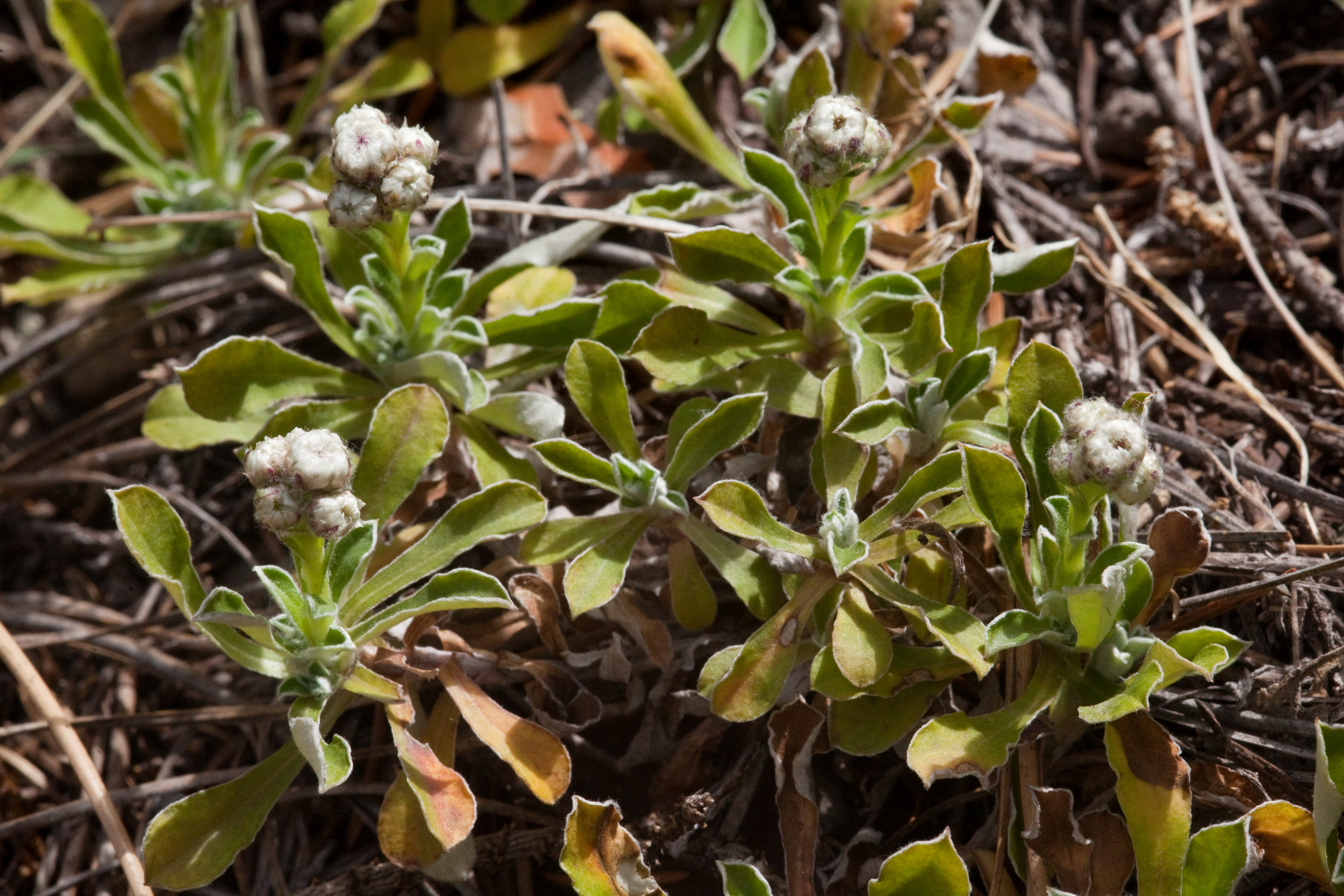

Conservation status
- Apparently Secure (NatureServe)

Scientific classification
- Kingdom: Plantae
- Clade: Tracheophytes
- Clade: Angiosperms
- Clade: Eudicots
- Clade: Asterids
- Order: Asterales
- Family: Asteraceae
- Genus: Antennaria
- Species: A. marginata

Binomial name
- Antennaria marginata Greene

Synonyms
- Antennaria fendleri Greene; Antennaria peramoena Greene

= Antennaria marginata =

Species of flowering plant

Antennaria marginata is a North American species of flowering plant in the family Asteraceae known by the common name whitemargin pussytoes. It is native to northern Mexico (Chihuahua, Coahuila) and the southwestern United States (Arizona, New Mexico, western Texas (Jeff Davis County), Colorado, Utah, southern Nevada (Clark County), and southern California (San Gregorio Mountain in San Bernardino County)).

Antennaria marginata is a small plant rarely more than 20 cm (8 inches) tall. The scientific epithet "marginata" and the "whitemargin" part of the common name refer to the fact that the leaves are hairless over most of the blade but with a ring of white wool-like hairs along the edge. The plants are dioecious, meaning that male and female flowers are borne on separate plants; some populations are known with no male plants.
