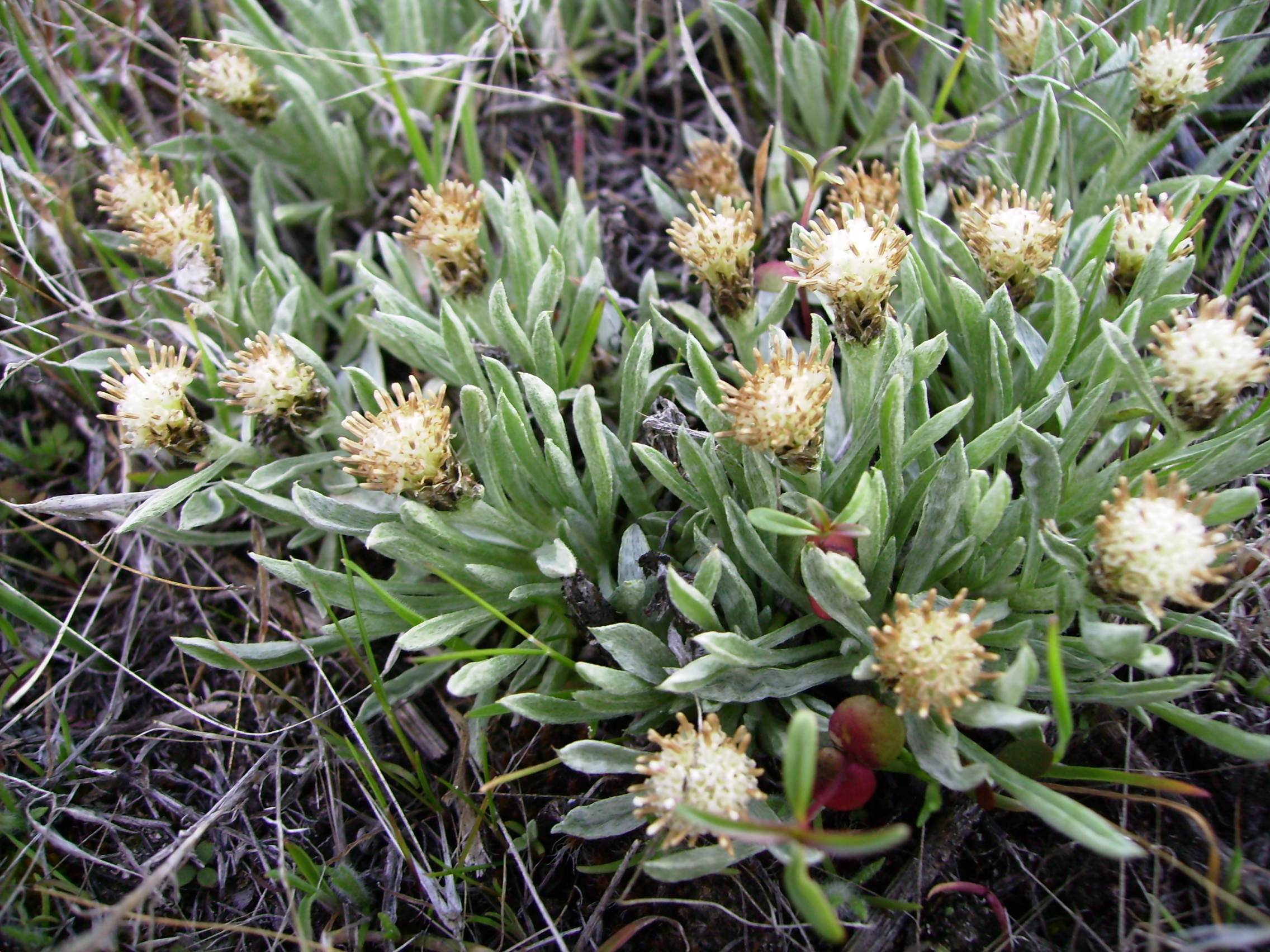
- Antennaria dimorpha near Monitor, Chelan County Washington

Conservation status
- Secure (NatureServe)

Scientific classification
- Kingdom: Plantae
- Clade: Tracheophytes
- Clade: Angiosperms
- Clade: Eudicots
- Clade: Asterids
- Order: Asterales
- Family: Asteraceae
- Genus: Antennaria
- Species: A. dimorpha

Binomial name
- Antennaria dimorpha (Nutt.) Torr. & A.Gray

Synonyms
- Antennaria dimorpha var. integra L.F.Hend.; Antennaria dimorpha var. macrocephala D.C.Eaton; Antennaria dimorpha var. nuttallii D.C.Eaton; Antennaria latisquama Piper; Antennaria macrocephala Rydb.; Gnaphalium dimorphum Nutt.

= Antennaria dimorpha =

Species of flowering plant

Antennaria dimorpha is a North American species of flowering plants in the family Asteraceae known by the common names low pussytoes or gray cushion pussytoes. It is native to western Canada (British Columbia, Alberta, Saskatchewan) and the western United States as far south as Riverside County in California and Rio Arriba County in New Mexico. It is generally found in dry areas. There are historical records of the species formerly occurring in northwestern Nebraska, but these populations appear now to be gone.

== Description ==
Antennaria dimorpha is a small mat-forming perennial herb growing in a flat patch from a thick, branching caudex. The spoon-shaped leaves are up to about a centimeter long and green but coated with long, gray hairs. The erect inflorescences are only a few centimeters tall and flowers often appear nestled among the foliage. Each stem holds a single flower head lined with dark brown and green patched phyllaries. It is dioecious, with male plants bearing heads of staminate flowers and female plants bearing heads of larger pistillate flowers. The fruit is an achene with a long, soft, barbed pappus. Older plants sometimes develop a dead spot in the center, with new growth forming a ring on the outside.

== Habitat ==
Antennaria dimorpha grows in dry, open places in scablands, sagebrush desert, and ponderosa pine forest openings, often on very rocky soils.

== Gallery ==
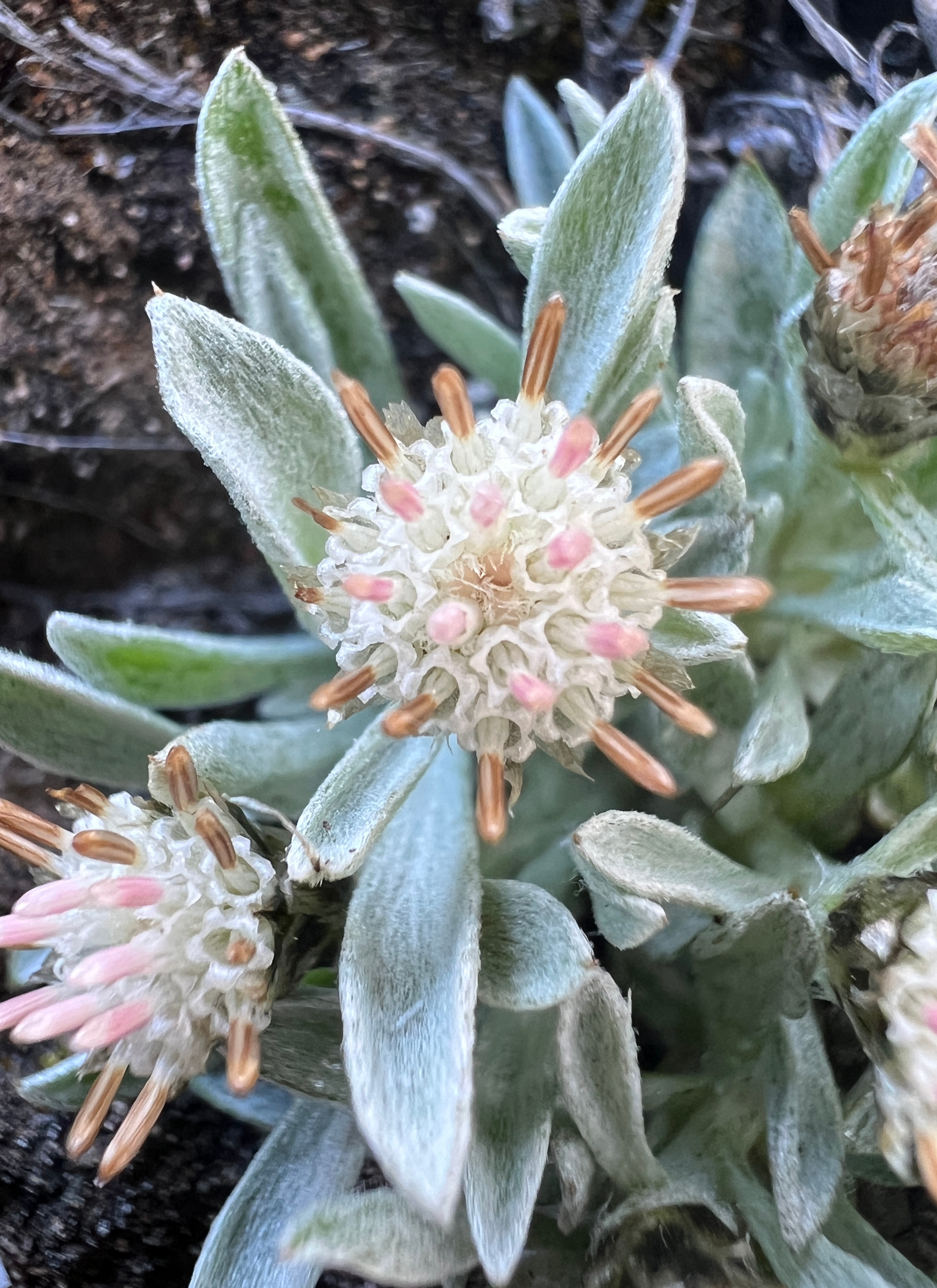
Flower
