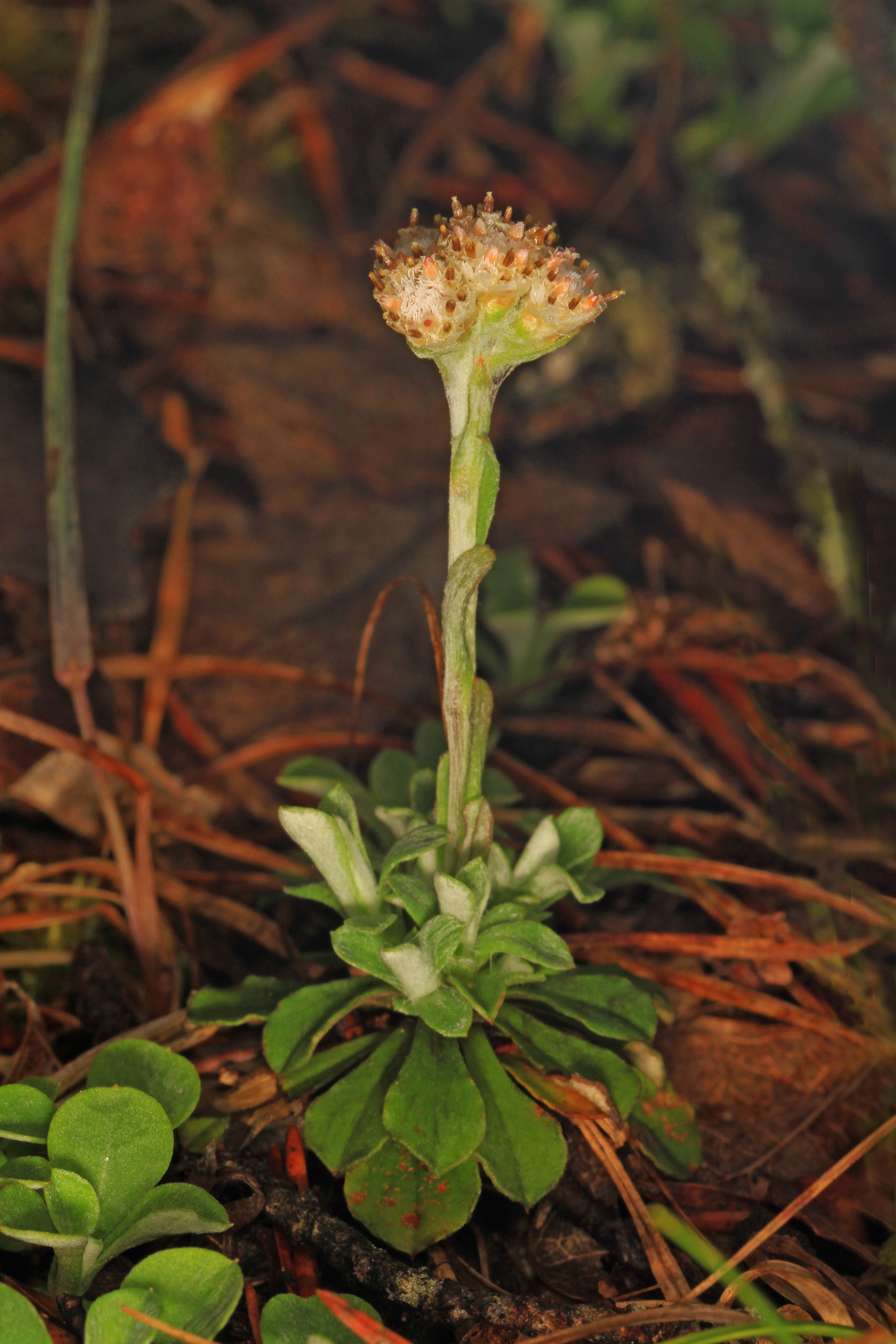

Scientific classification
- Kingdom: Plantae
- Clade: Embryophytes
- Clade: Tracheophytes
- Clade: Spermatophytes
- Clade: Angiosperms
- Clade: Eudicots
- Clade: Asterids
- Order: Asterales
- Family: Asteraceae
- Genus: Antennaria
- Species: A. virginica

Binomial name
- Antennaria virginica Stebbins

Synonyms
- Antennaria neglecta var. argillicola (Stebbins) Cronquist; Antennaria neodioica var. argillicola (Stebbins) Fernald; Antennaria virginica var. argillicola Stebbins

= Antennaria virginica =

Species of flowering plant

Antennaria virginica is a North American species of flowering plants in the family Asteraceae known by the common names shalebarren pussytoes. It grows on Devonian shale barrens in the eastern United States. It is found in central Appalachian Mountains of Pennsylvania, Maryland, West Virginia, and Virginia, with a few populations in eastern Ohio.

Antennaria virginica grows up to 25 cm (10 inches) tall, spreading by horizontal stems that run along the surface of the ground. Male and female flower heads are borne on separate plants. One plant can have several heads in a flat-topped array.
