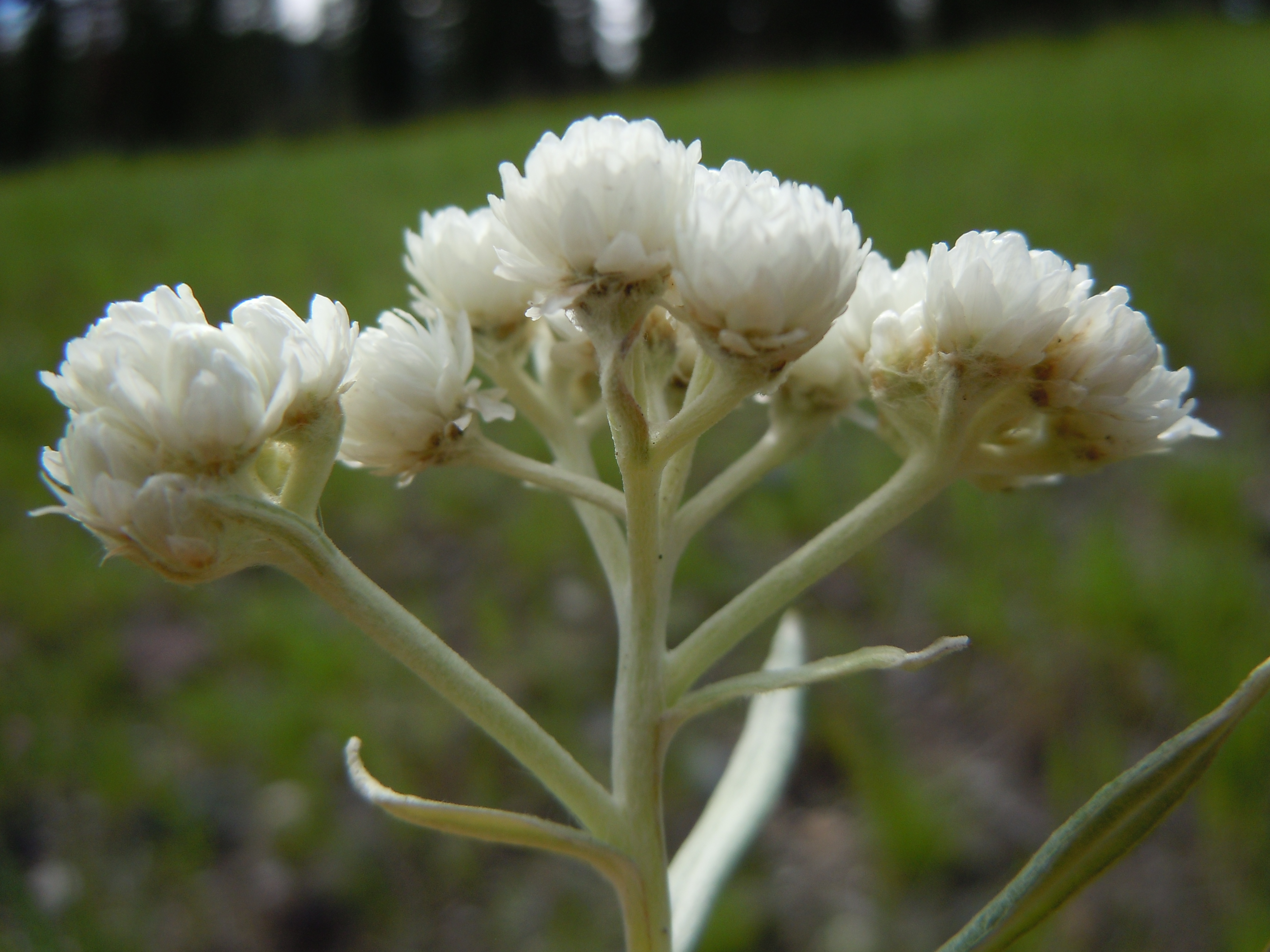

Conservation status
- Secure (NatureServe)

Scientific classification
- Kingdom: Plantae
- Clade: Tracheophytes
- Clade: Angiosperms
- Clade: Eudicots
- Clade: Asterids
- Order: Asterales
- Family: Asteraceae
- Genus: Antennaria
- Species: A. anaphaloides

Binomial name
- Antennaria anaphaloides Rydb.

= Antennaria anaphaloides =

Species of flowering plant

Antennaria anaphaloides, the pearly pussytoes, is a North American species of plants in the family Asteraceae. It is native to western Canada (British Columbia, Alberta, Saskatchewan) and the western United States (primarily the Rocky Mountains, with additional populations in the Great Basin and northeastern part of the Colorado Plateau).
