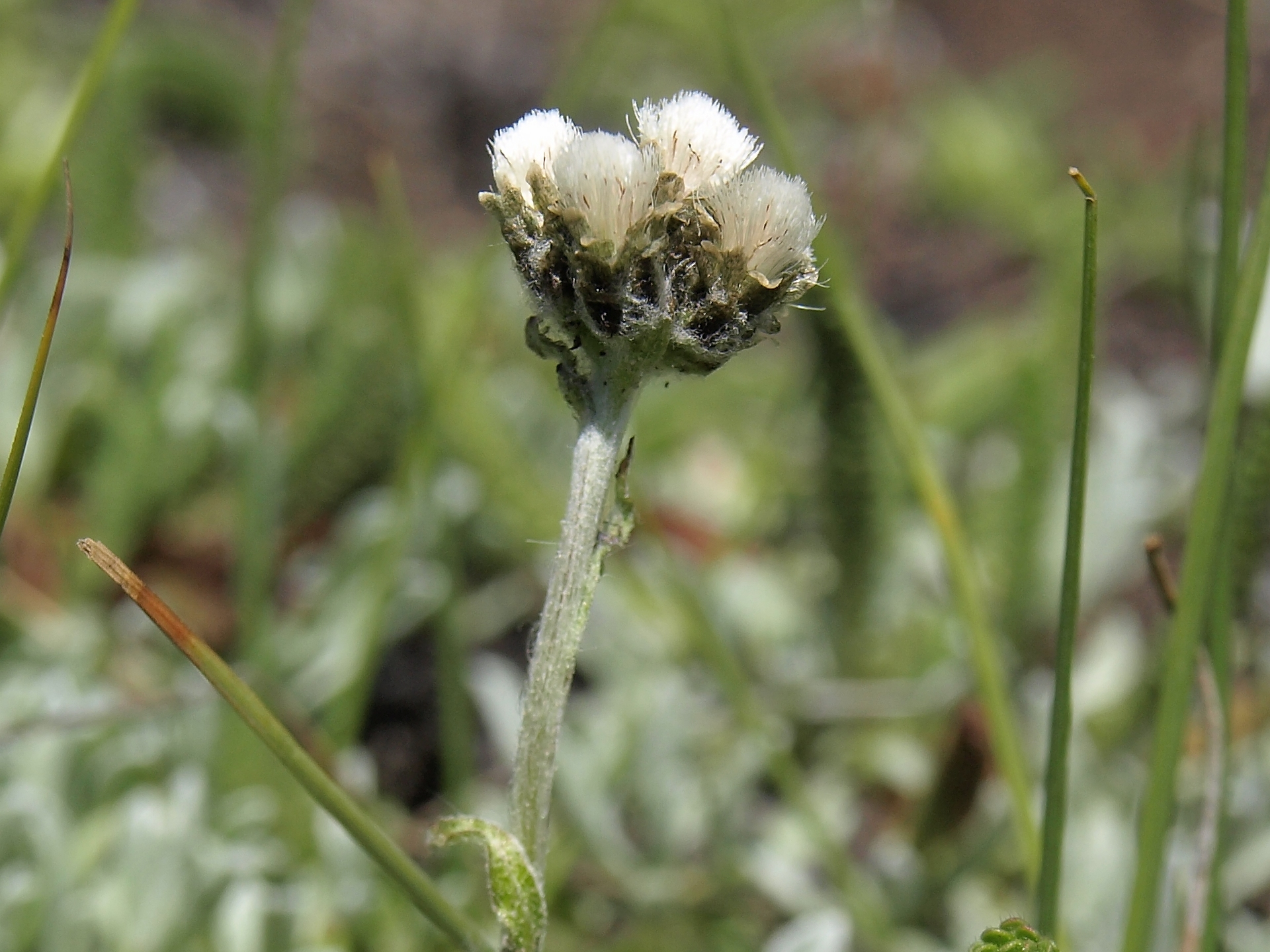

Conservation status
- Vulnerable (NatureServe)

Scientific classification
- Kingdom: Plantae
- Clade: Tracheophytes
- Clade: Angiosperms
- Clade: Eudicots
- Clade: Asterids
- Order: Asterales
- Family: Asteraceae
- Genus: Antennaria
- Species: A. pulchella

Binomial name
- Antennaria pulchella Greene

Synonyms
- Antennaria scabra Greene; Antennaria alpina var. scabra (Greene) Jeps.; Antennaria media subsp. ciliata E.E.Nelson; Antennaria media subsp. pulchella (Greene) Chmiel.

= Antennaria pulchella =

Species of flowering plant

Antennaria pulchella is a North American species of flowering plants in the family Asteraceae known by the common names Sierra pussytoes and beautiful pussytoes. It is native primarily to high elevations in the Sierra Nevada from Nevada County to Tulare County, where it is a plant of the alpine climate. Additional populations occur on Lassen Peak in Lassen County, and also in Washoe County, Nevada.

== Description ==
Antennaria pulchella is a small, mat-forming perennial herb growing a patch of woolly grayish leaves dotted with purplish glands. It spreads via a tangled network of stolons. The erect inflorescence reaches no more than about twelve centimetres (4.7 in) tall. The species is dioecious, with male and female plants producing flower heads of slightly different morphologies. The fruit is an achene up to half a centimeter long, most of which is a long, soft pappus.
