= Antennaria soliceps =

Conservation status
- Critically Imperiled (NatureServe)

Scientific classification
- Kingdom: Plantae
- Clade: Tracheophytes
- Clade: Angiosperms
- Clade: Eudicots
- Clade: Asterids
- Order: Asterales
- Family: Asteraceae
- Genus: Antennaria
- Species: A. soliceps

Binomial name
- Antennaria soliceps S.F.Blake

Species of flowering plant

Antennaria soliceps is a rare species of flowering plant in the family Asteraceae known by the common name Charleston Mountain pussytoes. It has been found only on Mount Charleston in Clark County in the southern part of the US state of Nevada.

Antennaria soliceps is a small plant rarely growing more than 2 inches (5.1 cm) from the ground, spreading by means of horizontal stems running along the surface of the ground. All known plants discovered to date are female, the species apparently relying exclusively on asexual reproduction. It grows on talus slopes near the tree line in the mountains, 3,000–3,400 meters (9,800–11,200 ft) above sea level.
