= Antennaria pulcherrima =

Conservation status
- Secure (NatureServe)

Scientific classification
- Kingdom: Plantae
- Clade: Tracheophytes
- Clade: Angiosperms
- Clade: Eudicots
- Clade: Asterids
- Order: Asterales
- Family: Asteraceae
- Genus: Antennaria
- Species: A. pulcherrima

Binomial name
- Antennaria pulcherrima (Hook.) Greene

Synonyms
- Antennaria carpatica var. pulcherrima Hook.; Antennaria pulcherrima var. angustisquama A.E.Porsild; Antennaria pulcherrima var. sordida B.Boivin; Antennaria carpatica var. humilis Hook., syn of subsp. eucosma; Antennaria eucosma Fernald & Wiegand., syn of subsp. eucosma

Species of flowering plant

Antennaria pulchella is a North American species of flowering plants in the family Asteraceae known by the common names showy pussytoes and handsome pussytoes. It is widespread across much of Canada including the three Arctic Territories, as well as in parts of the United States (Alaska, the northern Rocky Mountains and northern Cascades).

== Description ==
Antennaria pulcherrima is a herbaceous plant up to 65 cm tall. Male and female flowers are borne on separate plants. It tends to grow on alluvial soils deposited by streams, generally in alpine or subarctic environments.

Subspecies

- Antennaria pulcherrima subsp. eucosma (Fernald & Wiegand) R.J.Bayer – limestone barrens in Newfoundland and on Anticosti Island (part of Quebec)
- Antennaria pulcherrima subsp. pulcherrima – most of species range
