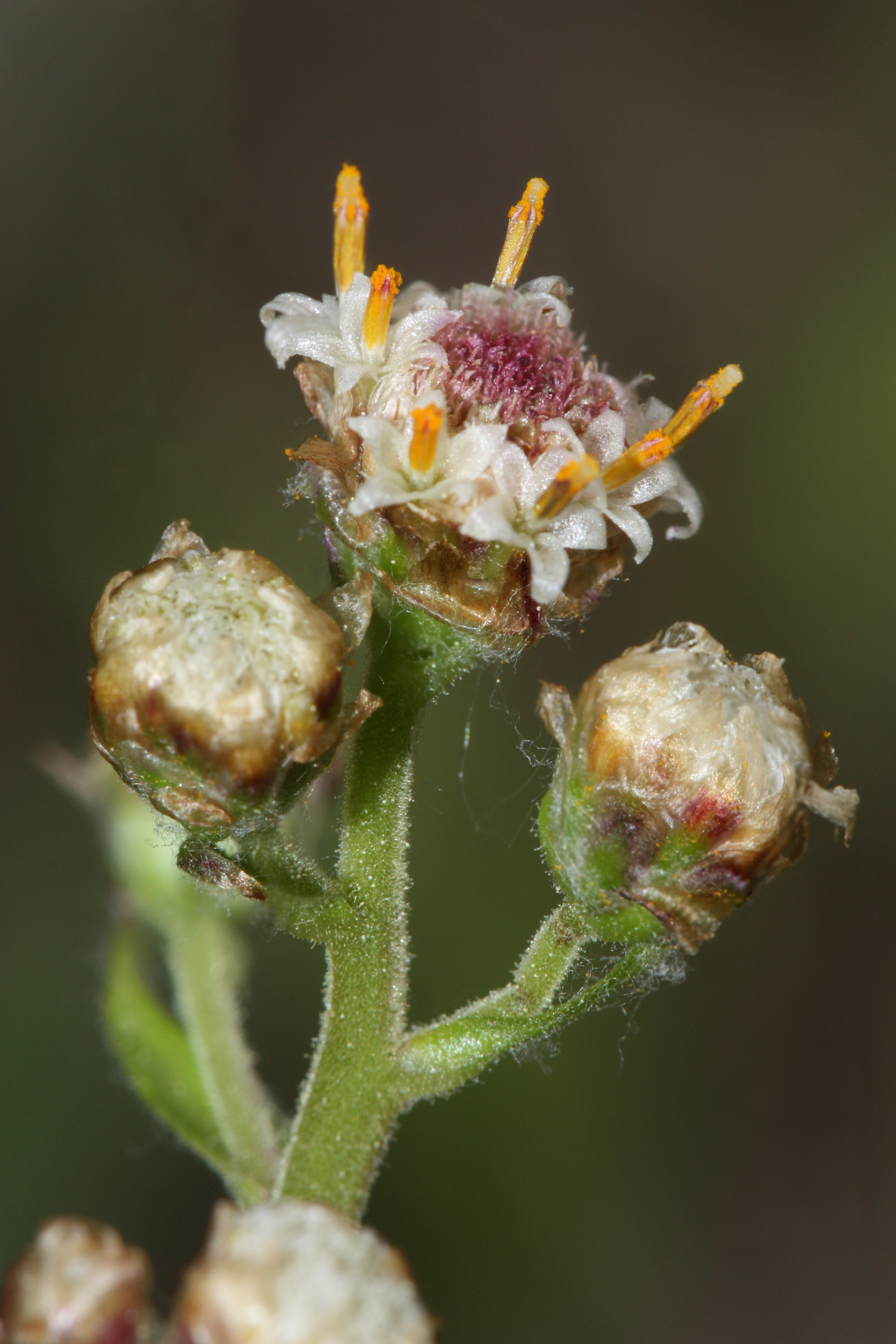
- Antennaria racemosa

Scientific classification
- Kingdom: Plantae
- Clade: Tracheophytes
- Clade: Angiosperms
- Clade: Eudicots
- Clade: Asterids
- Order: Asterales
- Family: Asteraceae
- Tribe: Gnaphalieae
- Genus: Antennaria; Gaertn.

Synonyms
- Disynanthus Raf.; Gnaphalium sect. Antennaria (Gaertn.) Miq.; Chamaezelum Link; Antennaria Link ex Fr.; Cyttarium Peterm.

= Antennaria =

Genus of flowering plants

Antennaria is a genus of dioecious perennial herbs in the family Asteraceae, native to temperate regions of the Northern Hemisphere, with a few species (A. chilensis, A. linearifolia, A. sleumeri) in temperate southern South America; the highest species diversity is in North America. Common names include catsfoot or cat's-foot, pussytoes and everlasting.

Different Antennaria species reach between 10 and 50 cm (3.9 and 19.7 in) in height. The leaves are basal and often stem leaves. The name Antennaria refers to the projecting stamens seen on the male flowers of some species, resembling insect antennae.

Antennaria species are used as food plants by the larvae of some Lepidoptera species including Vanessa virginiensis (American painted lady), Coleophora pappiferella (which feeds exclusively on A. dioica), Schinia verna (which feeds on several Antennaria species).

== Selected species ==
- Antennaria alpina (L.) Gaertn. – alpine catsfoot
- Antennaria anaphaloides Rydb. – pearly pussytoes
- Antennaria arcuata Cronq. – box pussytoes
- Antennaria argentea Benth. – silver pussytoes
- Antennaria aromatica Evert – scented pussytoes
- Antennaria boecheriana A.E.Porsild – Boecher's catsfoot
- Antennaria carpatica (Wahlenb.) Bluff & Fingerh. – Carpathian catsfoot
- Antennaria caucasica Boriss. – Caucasian catsfoot
- Antennaria chilensis Remy – Chilean catsfoot
- Antennaria corymbosa E. Nels. – flat-top pussytoes
- Antennaria densifolia Porsild – denseleaf pussytoes
- Antennaria dimorpha (Nutt.) Torr. & Gray – low pussytoes
- Antennaria dioica (L.) Gaertn. – mountain everlasting
- Antennaria eucosma Fern. & Wieg. – Newfoundland pussytoes
- Antennaria flagellaris (Gray) Gray – whip pussytoes
- Antennaria friesiana (Trautv.) Ekman – Fries' pussytoes
- Antennaria geyeri Gray – pinewoods pussytoes
- Antennaria howellii Greene (syn. A. canadensis) – Howell's pussytoes
- Antennaria lanata (Hook.) Greene – woolly pussytoes
- Antennaria luzuloides Torr. & Gray – rush pussytoes
- Antennaria marginata Greene – whitemargin pussytoes
- Antennaria media Greene – Rocky Mountain pussytoes
- Antennaria microphylla Rydb. – littleleaf pussytoes
- Antennaria monocephala DC. – pygmy pussytoes
- Antennaria neglecta Greene – field pussytoes
- Antennaria nordhageniana Rune & Rönning
- Antennaria parlinii Fern. – Parlin's pussytoes
- Antennaria parvifolia Nutt. – small-leaf pussytoes
- Antennaria plantaginifolia (L.) Richards. – plantainleaf pussytoes
- Antennaria porsildii E.Ekman
- Antennaria pulchella Greene – Sierra pussytoes
- Antennaria pulcherrima (Hook.) Greene – showy pussytoes
- Antennaria racemosa Hook. – raceme pussytoes
- Antennaria rosea Greene – rosy pussytoes
- Antennaria rosulata Rydb. – Kaibab pussytoes
- Antennaria soliceps Blake – Charleston Mountain pussytoes
- Antennaria solitaria Rydb. – singlehead pussytoes
- Antennaria stenophylla (A.Gray) A.Gray – narrowleaf pussytoes
- Antennaria suffrutescens Greene – evergreen everlasting
- Antennaria umbrinella Rydb. – umber pussytoes
- Antennaria villifera Boriss.
- Antennaria virginica Stebbins – shale barren pussytoes

=== Hybrids ===
- Antennaria × erigeroides Greene (pro sp.)
- Antennaria × foliacea Greene (pro sp.)
- Antennaria × macounii Greene (pro sp.)
- Antennaria × oblancifolia E.Nels. (pro sp.)

== Gallery ==
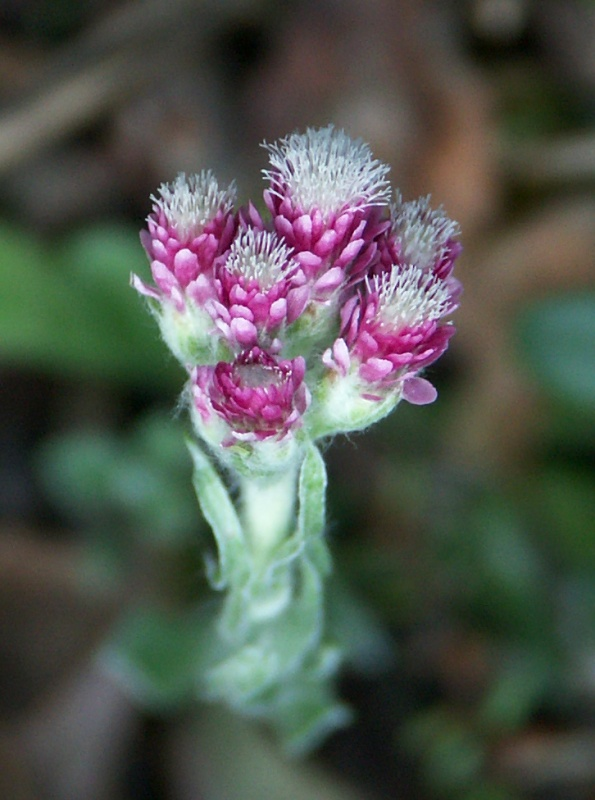
Antennaria dioica

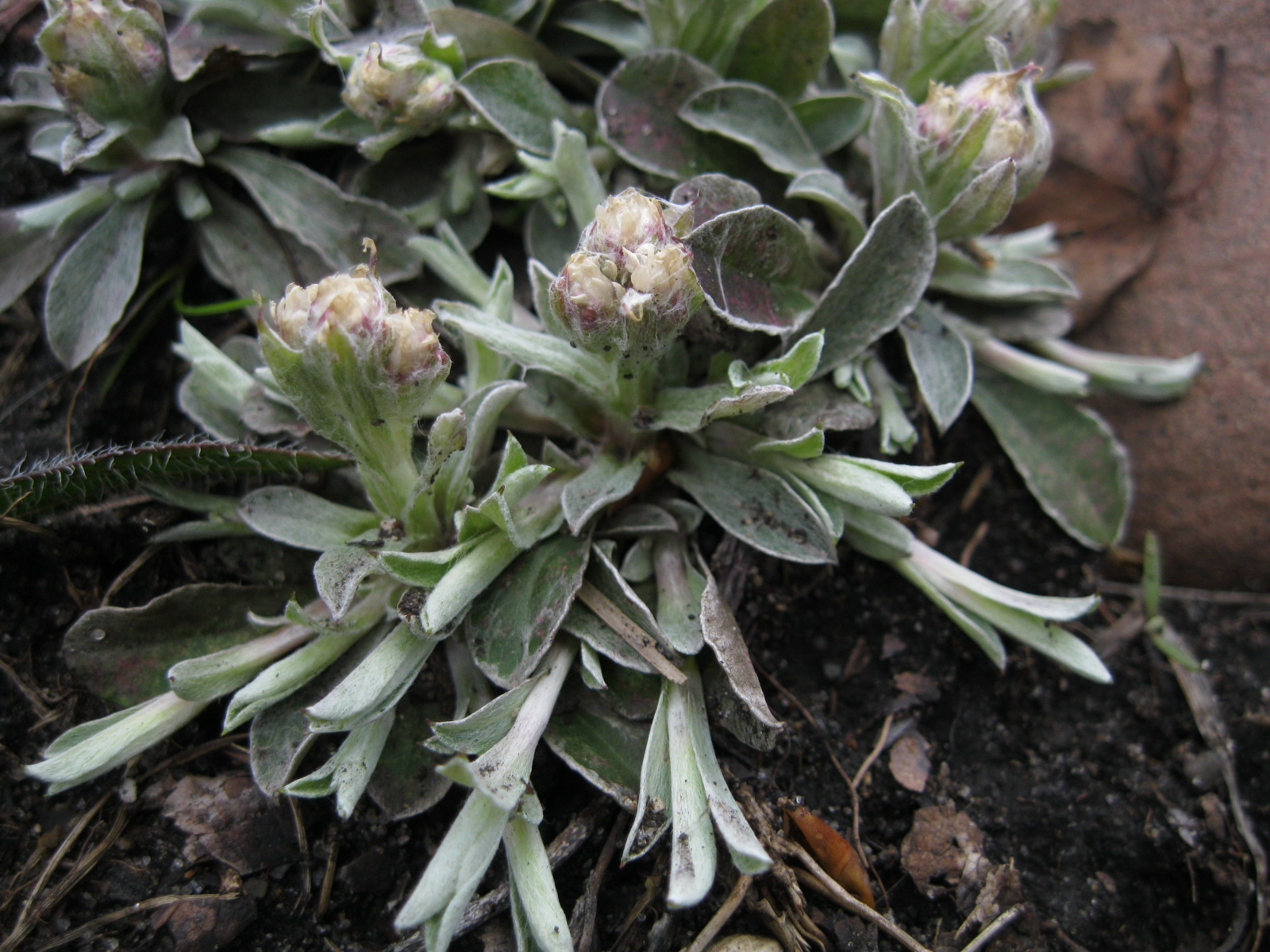
Field pussytoes (Antennaria neglecta) in spring, with flowerbuds and runners
