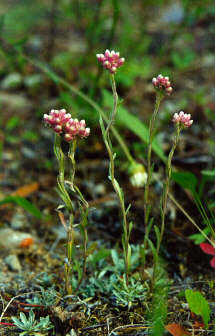

Conservation status
- Secure (NatureServe)

Scientific classification
- Kingdom: Plantae
- Clade: Tracheophytes
- Clade: Angiosperms
- Clade: Eudicots
- Clade: Asterids
- Order: Asterales
- Family: Asteraceae
- Genus: Antennaria
- Species: A. microphylla

Binomial name
- Antennaria microphylla Rydb. 1897 not Gand. 1887 (not validly published)

Synonyms
- Synonymy: Antennaria bracteosa Rydb.; Antennaria nitida Greene; Antennaria angustata Greene; Antennaria burwellensis Malte; Antennaria congesta Malte; Antennaria fernaldiana Polunin; Antennaria hudsonica Malte; Antennaria megacephala Fernald; Antennaria pygmaea Fernald; Antennaria solstitialis Lunell ex Lunell; Antennaria tansleyi Polunin; Antennaria tweedsmuirii Polunin

= Antennaria microphylla =

Species of flowering plant

Antennaria microphylla (littleleaf pussytoes, rosy pussytoes, pink pussytoes, small pussytoes, dwarf everlasting) is a stoloniferous perennial forb in the family Asteraceae. It is widespread across northern and western North America, from Alaska and the three Canadian Arctic territories east to Quebec and south to Minnesota, New Mexico, and California.

Antennaria microphylla can be found growing in plains, hills, dry meadow, and open wood habitats. It is a small herb with male and female flowers on separate plants. It grows from 1.2 to 12 inches (3.0 to 30.5 cm) with spoon shaped or oblong leaves; it blossoms from late May to July. The Columbian ground squirrel feeds on Litteleaf pussytoes.

== Cultivation ==
Littleleaf pussytoes is valued by gardeners for its charming, very fine foliage as a garden groundcover.
