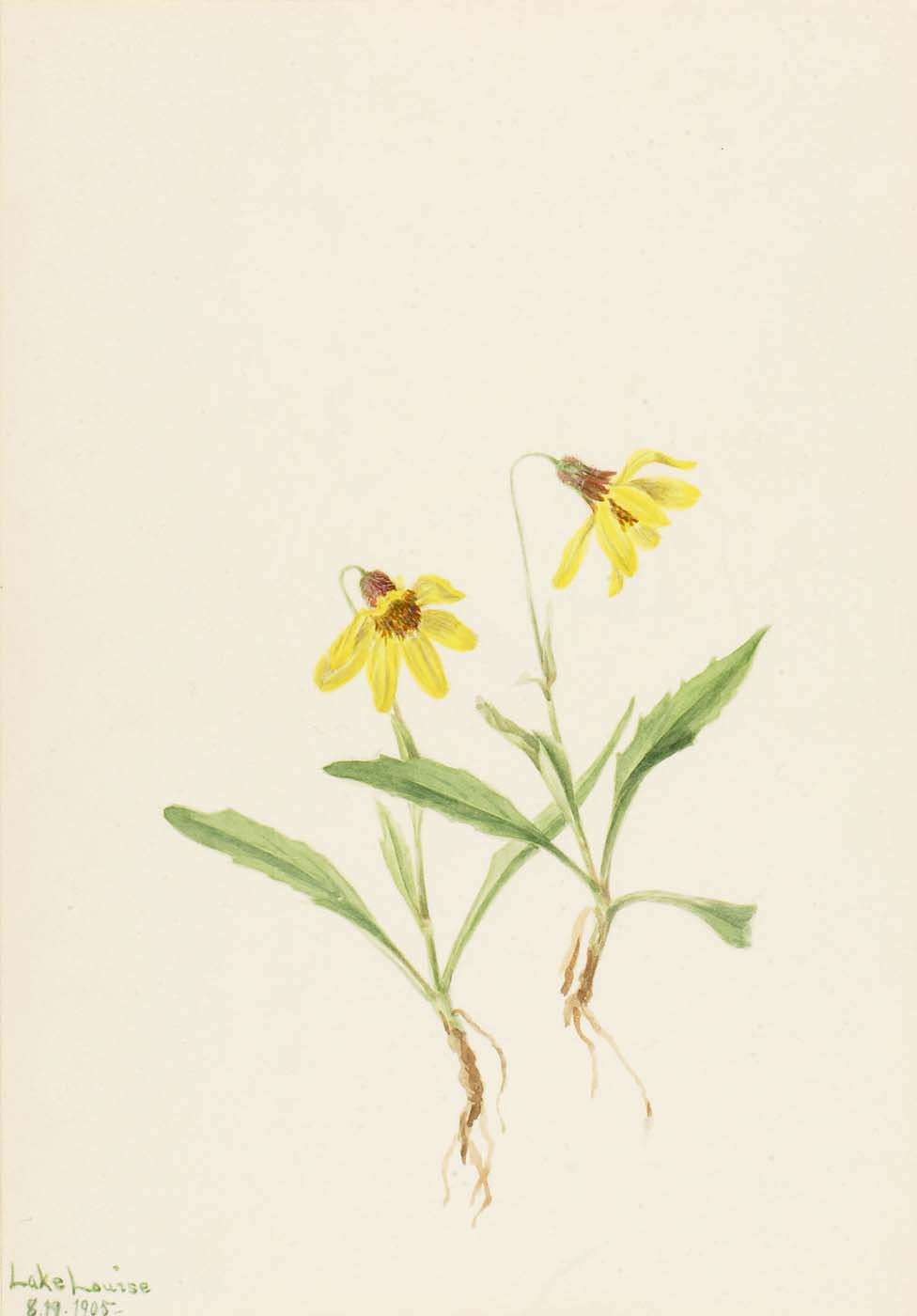
- Lake Louise arnica painted by Mary Vaux Walcott, 1905

Conservation status
- Vulnerable (NatureServe)

Scientific classification
- Kingdom: Plantae
- Clade: Tracheophytes
- Clade: Angiosperms
- Clade: Eudicots
- Clade: Asterids
- Order: Asterales
- Family: Asteraceae
- Genus: Arnica
- Species: A. louiseana

Binomial name
- Arnica louiseana Farr

Synonyms
- Arnica louiseana var. genuina; Arnica louiseana subsp. genuina

= Arnica louiseana =

Plant species in the sunflower family

Arnica louiseana is a Canadian species of flowering plant in the sunflower family, known by the common name Lake Louise arnica or snow arnica. It is native to the Canadian Rockies in Alberta and British Columbia, and named for Lake Louise in Banff National Park.

It is a small plant rarely more than 20 cm (8 in) tall. Flower heads are yellow, with both ray florets and disc florets. It grows at high elevations in alpine tundra and rocky outcrops.

== Description ==
Arnica louiseana ranges from 5 to 20 cm (2 to 8 in) when full grown with simple, unbranched above ground stems. It grows from rhizomes, creeping underground stems. Plants usually have pairs of cauline leaves, ones that attach to the stems rather than to the base of the plant, but are crowded towards the base of the stems particularly in short plants. Each stem will have one to three pairs of leaves that are elliptic, oblong, or ovate-lanceolate in shape. They measure 1.5 to 7.5 cm in length and just 0.5 to 2 cm wide. Usually the edges of the leaves are smooth, however they can be denticulate, very finely toothed, or slightly undulate, a wavy edge.

Usually plants will have just one flowering head, but on occasion they may have two or three. When blooming they nod, hang downward rather than facing upwards. Both the ray and disk flowers are light yellow in colour. Each flowering head will have seven to ten ray flowers, each producing a petal 12–14 mm long. When blooming the flowers are noticeably fragrant.

The seeds are brown cypselae, each 3–5 mm with a white pappus, the parachute for distributing the seed like a dandelion.

== Taxonomy ==
Arnica louiseana was scientifically described and named by the botanist Edith May Farr in 1906. It has two botanical synonyms both described by Bassett Maguire, a variety he named genuina in 1942 and in 1943 published as a subspecies. The species is classified as part of the genus Arnica, a part of the Asteraceae family.

=== Names ===
The species name was selected for the species by Farr because the specimens were found on Mt. Fairview near Lake Louise in Banff National Park. It is known by the common names of Lake Louise arnica or snow arnica. In French it is called arnica du lac Louise.

== Range and habitat ==
Arnica louiseana is endemic to Canada and only grows in British Columbia and Alberta. There its range extends across 20,000 to 200,000 km^{2} (7,700 to 77,200 sq mi). The total number of populations is estimated at 21 to 80. All documented occurrences in Alberta are found in the southwest of the province in the Rocky Mountains. Its habitat is between 1,800 and 2,100 m (5,900 and 6,900 ft) in elevation.

This species grows on exposed slopes in the alpine tundra and on calcareous rock slides.

=== Conservation ===
In 2021 the conservation organization NatureServe evaluated the species as vulnerable (G3) due to it being an endemic species that is not found in large numbers. No information was available about population changes for the species, but most populations are found in protected areas.
