= A. acaulis =

A. acaulis may refer to:

An abbreviation of a species name. In binomial nomenclature the name of a species is always the name of the genus to which the species belongs, followed by the species name (also called the species epithet). In A. acaulis the genus name has been abbreviated to A. and the species has been spelled out in full. In a document that uses this abbreviation it should always be clear from the context which genus name has been abbreviated.

Some of the most common uses of A. acaulis are:

- Abolboda acaulis, a flowering plant endemic to South America
- Aiphanes acaulis, a spiny palm
- Aletes acaulis, a plant endemic to North America
- Alsophila acaulis, a tree fern
- Anisocoma acaulis, a wildflower
- Arctotis acaulis, a flowering plant native to Africa
- Arnica acaulis, a sunflower
- Asphodelus acaulis, a garden plant
