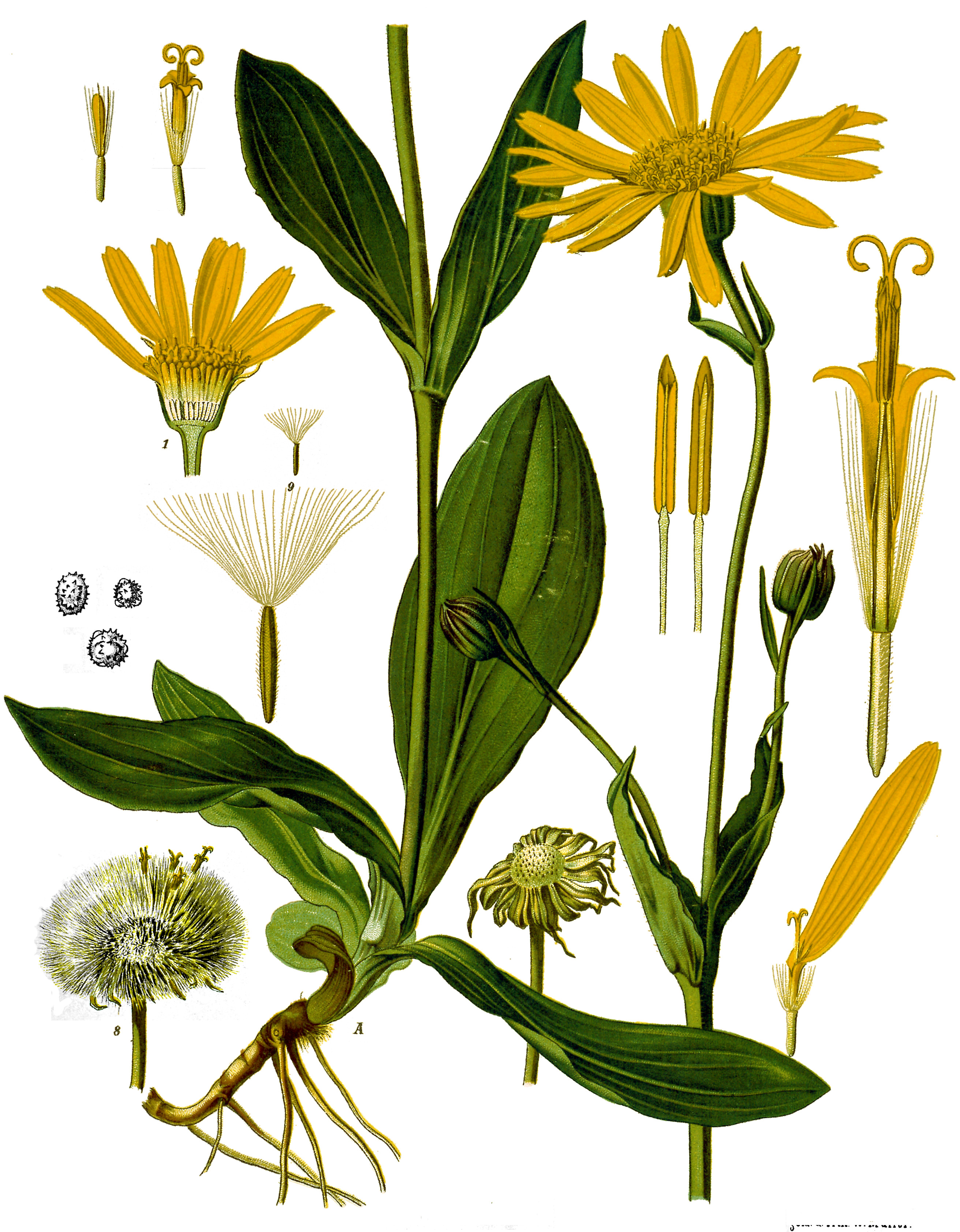
- Arnica montana

Scientific classification
- Kingdom: Plantae
- Clade: Embryophytes
- Clade: Tracheophytes
- Clade: Angiosperms
- Clade: Eudicots
- Clade: Asterids
- Order: Asterales
- Family: Asteraceae
- Subfamily: Asteroideae
- Tribe: Madieae
- Subtribe: Arnicinae; B.G.Baldwin
- Genus: Arnica; L. 1753 not Boehm. 1760

Synonyms
- Mallotopus Franch. & Sav.; Whitneya A.Gray; Gerbera Boehm.; Aliseta Raf.; Epiclinastrum Bojer ex DC.; Aphyllocaulon Lag.

= Arnica =

Genus of flowering plants

Arnica /ˈɑːrnɪkə/ is a genus of perennial, herbaceous plants in the sunflower family (Asteraceae). The genus name Arnica may be derived from the Greek arni, "lamb", in reference to the plants' soft, hairy leaves. Arnica is also known by the names mountain tobacco and, confusingly, leopard's bane and wolfsbane—two names that it shares with the entirely unrelated genus Aconitum.

This circumboreal and montane (subalpine) genus occurs mostly in the temperate regions of western North America, with a few species native to the Arctic regions of northern Eurasia and North America.

Arnica species are used as food plants by the larvae of some Lepidoptera species, including Bucculatrix arnicella.

Arnica was previously classified in the tribe Senecioneae because it has a flower or pappus of fine bristles.

Arnica is the basis of a homeopathic remedy promoted for aiding bruise recovery.

== Characteristics ==
Arnica plants have a deep-rooted, erect stem that is usually unbranched. Their downy opposite leaves are borne towards the apex of the stem. The ovoid, leathery basal leaves are arranged in a rosette.

They show large yellow or orange flowers, 6–8 cm (2–3 in) wide with 10–15 cm (4–6 in) long ray florets and numerous disc florets. The phyllaries (a bract under the flowerhead) has long spreading hairs. Each phyllary is associated with a ray floret. Species of Arnica, with an involucre (a circle of bracts surrounding the flower head) arranged in two rows, have only their outer phyllaries associated with ray florets. The flowers have a slight aromatic smell.

The seedlike fruit has a pappus of plumose, white or pale tan bristles. The entire plant has a strong and distinct pine-sage odor when the leaves of mature plants are rubbed or bruised.

== Arnica montana ==
The species Arnica montana, native to Europe, has long been used in folk medicine, but there is no clinical evidence for its homeopathic use as an effective therapy.

=== Toxicity ===
Arnica montana contains the toxin helenalin, which can be poisonous if large amounts of the plant are eaten, and contact with the plant can also cause skin irritation. Medical preparations can cause skin irritation if applied topically, and adverse effects include headache and drowsiness if ingested. High doses can have severe adverse effects including death.

== Species ==
Accepted species:

- Arnica acaulis—Common leopardbane—eastern US from Alabama to New Jersey
- Arnica angustifolia—Narrowleaf arnica—Canada (from British Columbia to Quebec), US (Montana, Idaho, Wyoming, Colorado); Russia, Scandinavia
- Arnica cernua—Serpentine arnica—California, Oregon
- Arnica chamissonis—Chamisso arnica—US west of Rockies including Alaska; Canada (British Columbia to Quebec plus Yukon + Northwest Territories)
- Arnica cordifolia—Heart-leaf leopardbane, heartleaf arnica—US West of Rockies plus Alaska + Michigan; Canada (from British Columbia to Quebec plus Yukon + Northwest Territories)
- Arnica dealbata—California
- Arnica discoidea—Rayless arnica—California, Oregon, Nevada, Washington
- Arnica fulgens—Foothill arnica, orange arnica, shining leopardbane—USA (west of Rockies plus Michigan); Canada (from British Columbia to Manitoba)
- Arnica gracilis—Smallhead arnica (A. latifolia x A. cordifolia)—US (Montana, Idaho, Wyoming, Colorado, Oregon, Washington); British Columbia, Alberta, Northwest Territories
- Arnica griscomii—Russia, Canada, Alaska
- Arnica intermedia—eastern Russia (Yakutskiya, Khabarovsk, Magadan)
- Arnica lanceolata—Arnica, lanceleaf arnica—US West of Rockies plus Alaska, Maine New Hampshire, Vermont, New York; Canada (British Columbia, Quebec, New Brunswick)
- Arnica latifolia—Broadleaf arnica—western US, western Canada
- Arnica lessingii—Nodding arnica—Kamchatka, Alaska, Yukon, Northwest Territories, British Columbia
- Arnica lonchophylla—Longleaf arnica—most of Canada; Alaska, Montana, Minnesota, South Dakota
- Arnica longifolia—Longleaf arnica, spearleaf arnica—US west of Rockies, British Columbia, Alberta
- Arnica louiseana—Lake Louise arnica—British Columbia, Alberta
- Arnica mallotopus—Honshu Island in Japan
- Arnica mollis—Hairy arnica, wooly arnica——US West of Rockies plus Alaska, New Hampshire + Vermont; Canada (from British Columbia to Quebec plus Yukon + Northwest Territories)
- Arnica montana—Mountain arnica—most of Europe plus Greenland; naturalized in India
- Arnica nevadensis—Nevada arnica—California, Oregon, Nevada, Washington
- Arnica ovata—British Columbia Alberta, Yukon, US West of Rockies
- Arnica parryi—Nodding arnica, Parry's arnica—British Columbia, Alberta, Yukon, US West of Rockies
- Arnica porsildiorum—Kamchatka, Yukon, Northwest Territories
- Arnica rydbergii—Rydberg arnica, Rydberg's arnica, subalpine arnica—British Columbia, Alberta, northwestern USA
- Arnica sachalinensis—Hokkaido, Sakhalin, Kurils, Irkutsk
- Arnica sororia—Twin arnica—British Columbia, Alberta, Saskatchewan, US West of Rockies
- Arnica spathulata—Klamath arnica—California, Oregon
- Arnica unalaschcensis—Alaska arnica—Hokkaido, Honshu, Kamchatka, Sakhalin, Kuril, Alaska
- Arnica venosa—Shasta County arnica—California
- Arnica viscosa—Mt. Shasta arnica—California, Oregon
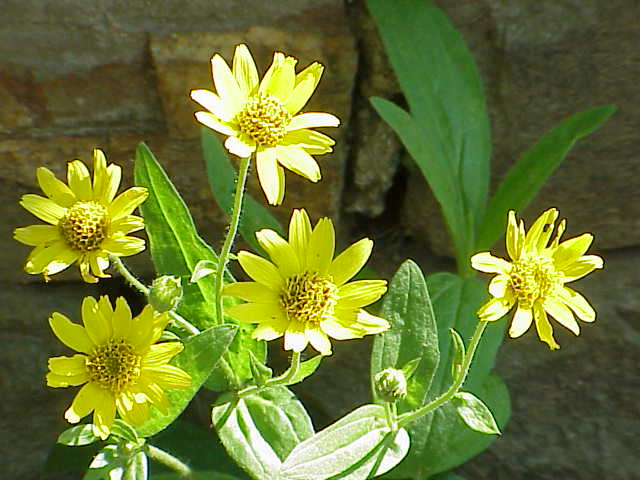
Arnica chamissonis

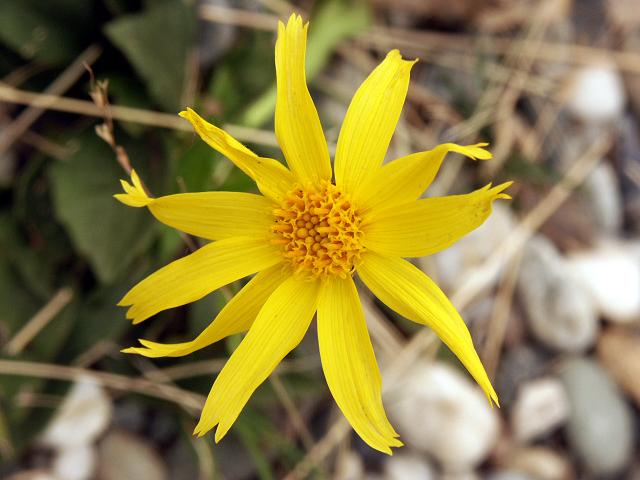
Arnica griscomii in the Alaskan Interior

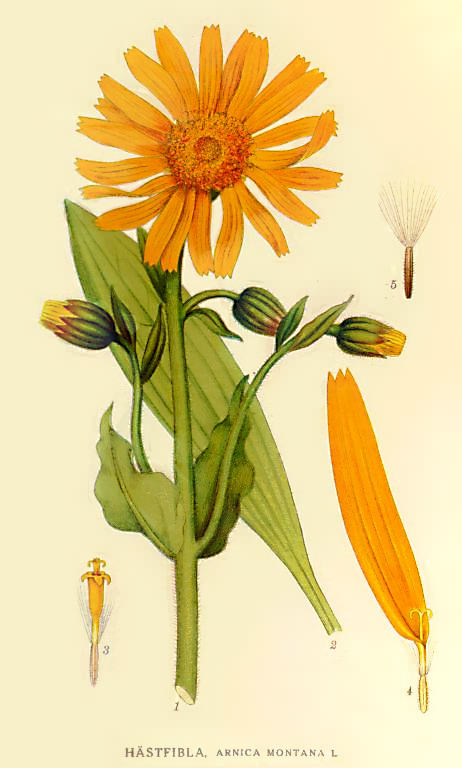
Mountain arnica (Arnica montana)

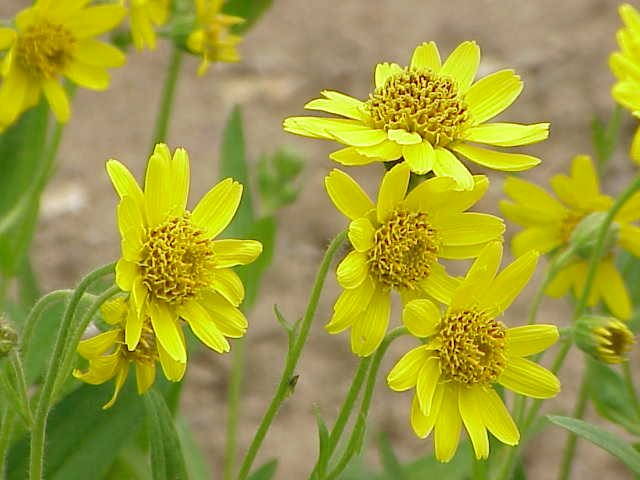
Longleaf arnica (Arnica longifolia)
