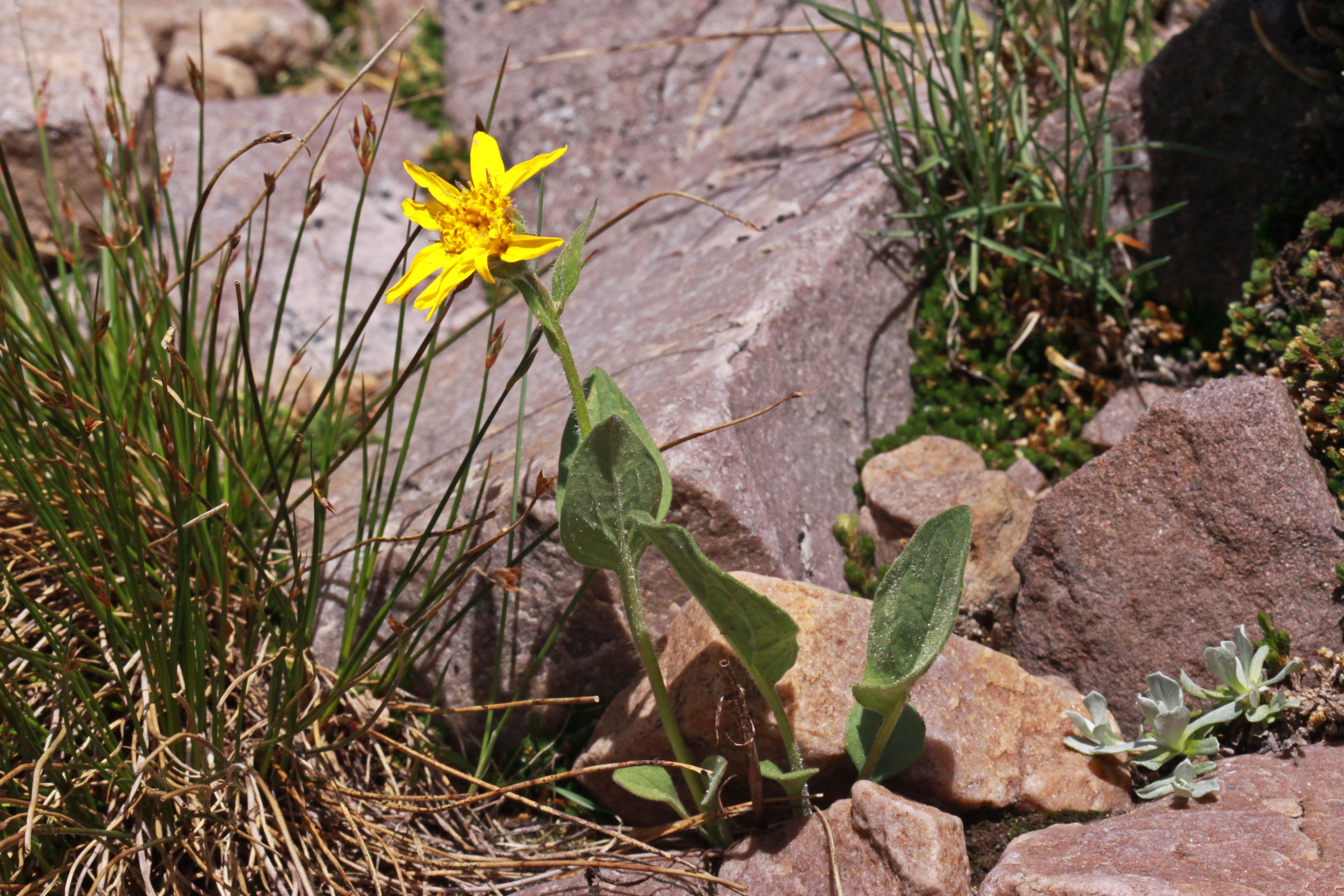

Conservation status
- Secure (NatureServe)

Scientific classification
- Kingdom: Plantae
- Clade: Tracheophytes
- Clade: Angiosperms
- Clade: Eudicots
- Clade: Asterids
- Order: Asterales
- Family: Asteraceae
- Genus: Arnica
- Species: A. rydbergii

Binomial name
- Arnica rydbergii Greene

Synonyms
- Arnica aurantiaca Greene; Arnica caespitosa A.Nelson; Arnica cascadensis H.St.John; Arnica lasiosperma Greene; Arnica sulcata Rydb.; Arnica tenuis Rydb.

= Arnica rydbergii =

Species of flowering plant

Arnica rydbergii is a North American species of flowering plant in the family Asteraceae, known by the common name Rydberg's arnica or subalpine arnica or subalpine leopardbane. It is native to western Canada (Alberta, British Columbia), and the western United States (Alaska, Washington, Oregon, Utah, Idaho, Montana, Utah, Wyoming, Colorado, South Dakota).

Arnica rydbergii is an herb up to 35 cm (14 inches) tall. Flower heads are yellow, with both ray florets and disc florets. It grows in alpine meadows and rocky slopes at high altitudes in mountainous areas.

The species is named for Swedish-American botanist Per Axel Rydberg, 1860–1931.
