= Arnica gracilis =

Scientific classification
- Kingdom: Plantae
- Clade: Tracheophytes
- Clade: Angiosperms
- Clade: Eudicots
- Clade: Asterids
- Order: Asterales
- Family: Asteraceae
- Genus: Arnica
- Species: A. gracilis

Binomial name
- Arnica gracilis Rydb.

Synonyms
- Arnica arcana A.Nelson; Arnica betonicifolia var. gracilis (Rydb.) M.E.Jones; Arnica columbiana A.Nelson; Arnica jonesii Rydb.; Arnica lactucina Greene; Arnica latifolia var. gracilis (Rydb.) Cronquist; Arnica multiflora Greene

Species of flowering plant

Arnica gracilis is a North American species of flowering plant in the family Asteraceae, known by the common name smallhead arnica. It is native to western Canada (Alberta, British Columbia) and the northwestern United States (Washington, Oregon, Idaho, Montana, Wyoming, north-central Colorado (Jackson County), and northern Utah (Cache, Summit, + Daggett Counties).

Arnica gracilis is an herb up to 30 cm (12 inches) tall. Flower heads are yellow, with both ray florets and disc florets.
