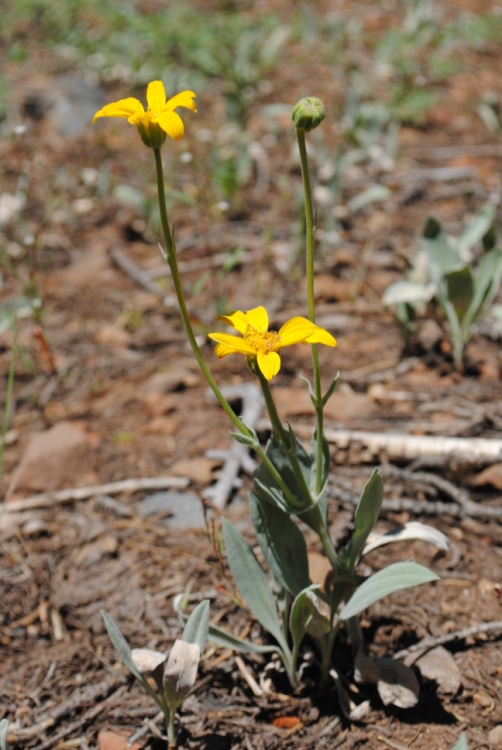
- Arnica dealbata in Lassen National Forest (Plumas County, California)

Conservation status
- Imperiled (NatureServe)

Scientific classification
- Kingdom: Plantae
- Clade: Tracheophytes
- Clade: Angiosperms
- Clade: Eudicots
- Clade: Asterids
- Order: Asterales
- Family: Asteraceae
- Genus: Arnica
- Species: A. dealbata

Binomial name
- Arnica dealbata (A.Gray) B.G.Baldw.

Synonyms
- Whitneya dealbata A.Gray

= Arnica dealbata =

Species of flowering plant

Arnica dealbata is a species of Californian plants in the tarweed tribe within the aster family

The species is known by the common name mock leopardbane.

== Distribution and habitat ==
It is endemic to California, where it is known from the Sierra Nevada and the southernmost slopes of the Cascade Range. It occurs in forest and meadow habitat in the mountains and foothills.

This plant is uncommon throughout its limited distribution and is listed as a sensitive species of Yosemite National Park, where it occurs in two locations.

== Description ==
It is a hairy, glandular, rhizomatous perennial herb producing an erect stem up to about 35 centimeters tall. The leaves have lance-shaped or pointed oval blades up to 10 centimeters long which are borne on petioles. They are arranged in opposite pairs, mostly near the base of the stem. The blades are coated densely in short curly hairs, some glandular. The inflorescence is a solitary flower head or cluster of a few heads. The head contains up to 12 yellow ray florets up to 2.5 centimeters long with many yellow disc florets at the center.
