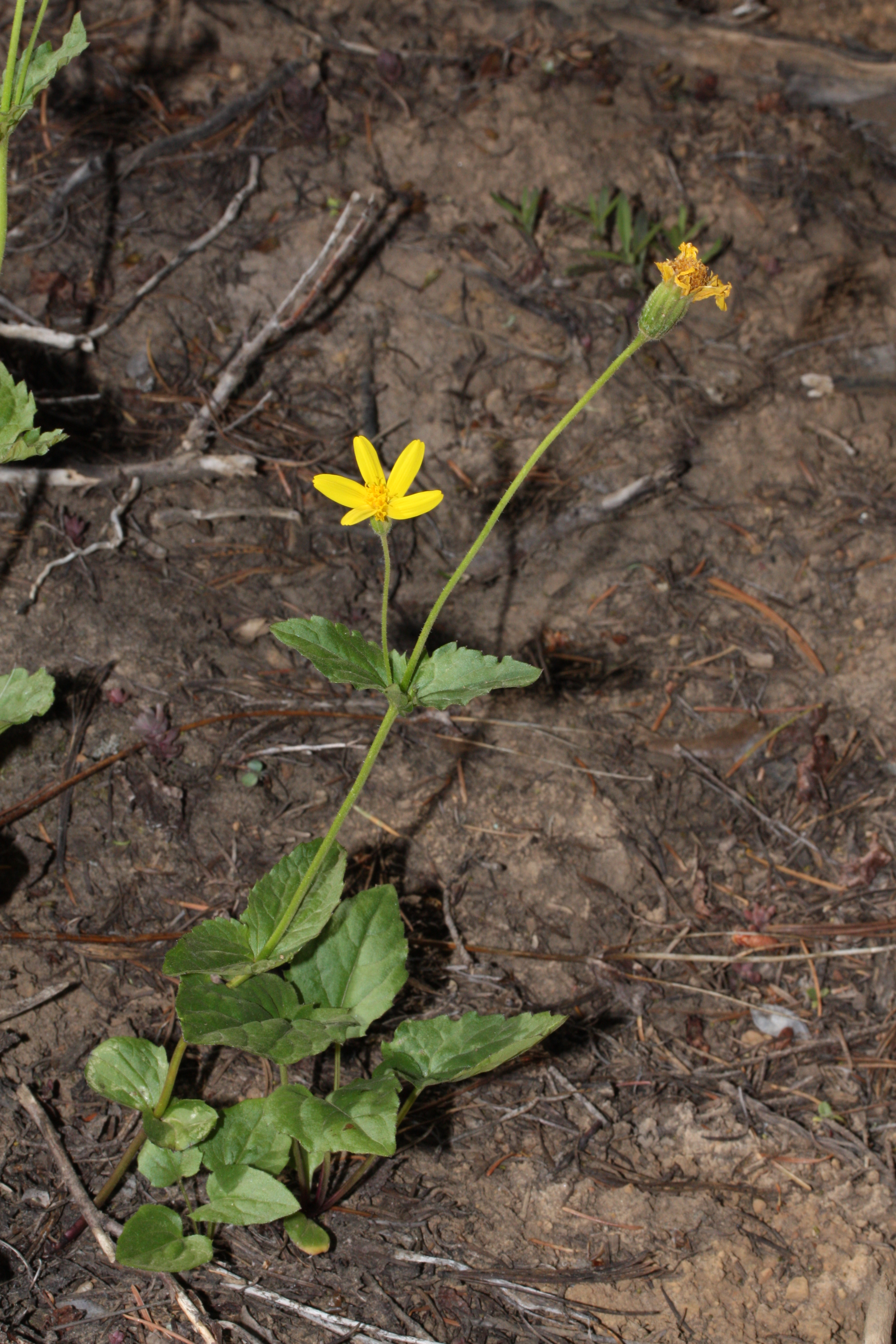
- Wenatchee National Forest, Washington

Conservation status
- Secure (NatureServe)

Scientific classification
- Kingdom: Plantae
- Clade: Tracheophytes
- Clade: Angiosperms
- Clade: Eudicots
- Clade: Asterids
- Order: Asterales
- Family: Asteraceae
- Genus: Arnica
- Species: A. latifolia

Binomial name
- Arnica latifolia Bong.

Synonyms
- Synonymy: Arnica aphanactis Piper; Arnica aprica Greene; Arnica betonicifolia Greene; Arnica eriopoda Gand.; Arnica flodmanii Rydb.; Arnica glabrata Rydb.; Arnica grandifolia Greene; Arnica granulifera Rydb.; Arnica intermedia Howell ex Rydb.; Arnica laevigata Greene; Arnica leptocaulis Rydb.; Arnica membranacea Rydb.; Arnica menziesii Hook.; Arnica oligolepis Rydb.; Arnica paucibracteata Rydb.; Arnica platyphylla A.Nelson; Arnica puberula Rydb.; Arnica teucriifolia Greene; Arnica ventorum Greene

= Arnica latifolia =

Species of flowering plant

Arnica latifolia is a species of arnica in the sunflower family, known by the common names broadleaf arnica, broad leaved arnica, mountain arnica, and daffodil leopardbane. It is native to western North America from Alaska east to Northwest Territories and south to Mono County, California, and Taos County, New Mexico. It grows in mountain habitat such as forest and meadows.

Arnica latifolia is a perennial herb growing from a long rhizome and producing a hairy, mostly naked stem 10 to 50 centimeters tall. It has a cluster of leaves around its base and usually a few pairs along the lower part of the stem. The leaves are lance-shaped to broad and nearly heart-shaped, and are usually toothed.

The inflorescence contains one or more daisy-like flower heads lined in glandular phyllaries. Each has a center of yellow disc florets and several yellow ray florets up to 3 centimeters long. The fruit is an achene with a white pappus.

The plant was first described in 1832 by German-Russian botanist Gustav Heinrich von Bongard, based on material collected near Sitka, now in Alaska (then called Russian America).

The species could be confused with the similar Arnica cordifolia, from which it can be distinguished by the leaves.
