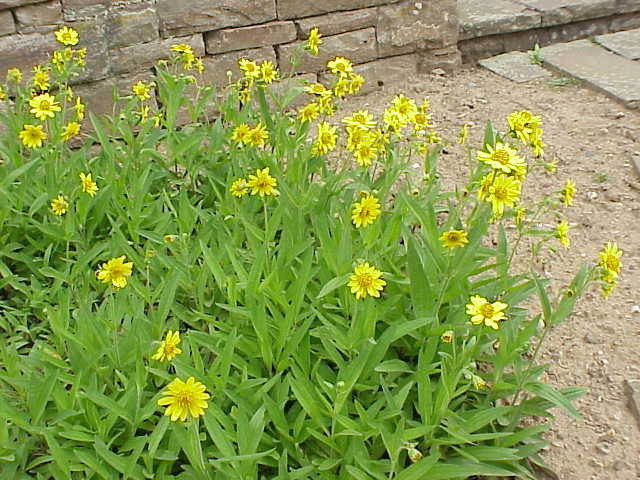

Conservation status
- Secure (NatureServe)

Scientific classification
- Kingdom: Plantae
- Clade: Tracheophytes
- Clade: Angiosperms
- Clade: Eudicots
- Clade: Asterids
- Order: Asterales
- Family: Asteraceae
- Genus: Arnica
- Species: A. longifolia

Binomial name
- Arnica longifolia D.C.Eaton

Synonyms
- Arnica caudata Rydb.; Arnica myriadenia Piper; Arnica polycephala A.Nelson

= Arnica longifolia =

Species of flowering plant

Arnica longifolia is a North American species of arnica in the sunflower family, known by the common names seep-spring arnica, longleaf arnica and spearleaf arnica. This flowering perennial is native to the forests of western Canada (British Columbia + Alberta) and the western United States (Rocky Mountains, Cascades, Coast Ranges, Sierra Nevada and other mountains of California, Oregon, Washington, Idaho, Nevada, Utah, Wyoming, Colorado, and Montana).

== Description ==
Arnica longifolia is a rhizomatous plant forming large bunching patches of groundcover in moist, cool areas. The foliage is rough, mint-green, and sometimes sticky with glandular secretions. The stems are erect and bear daisylike flower heads with a diameter of 2 cm, with deep yellow ray florets and yellow to reddish or orange disc florets. The fruit is a reddish achene with a small pappus.
