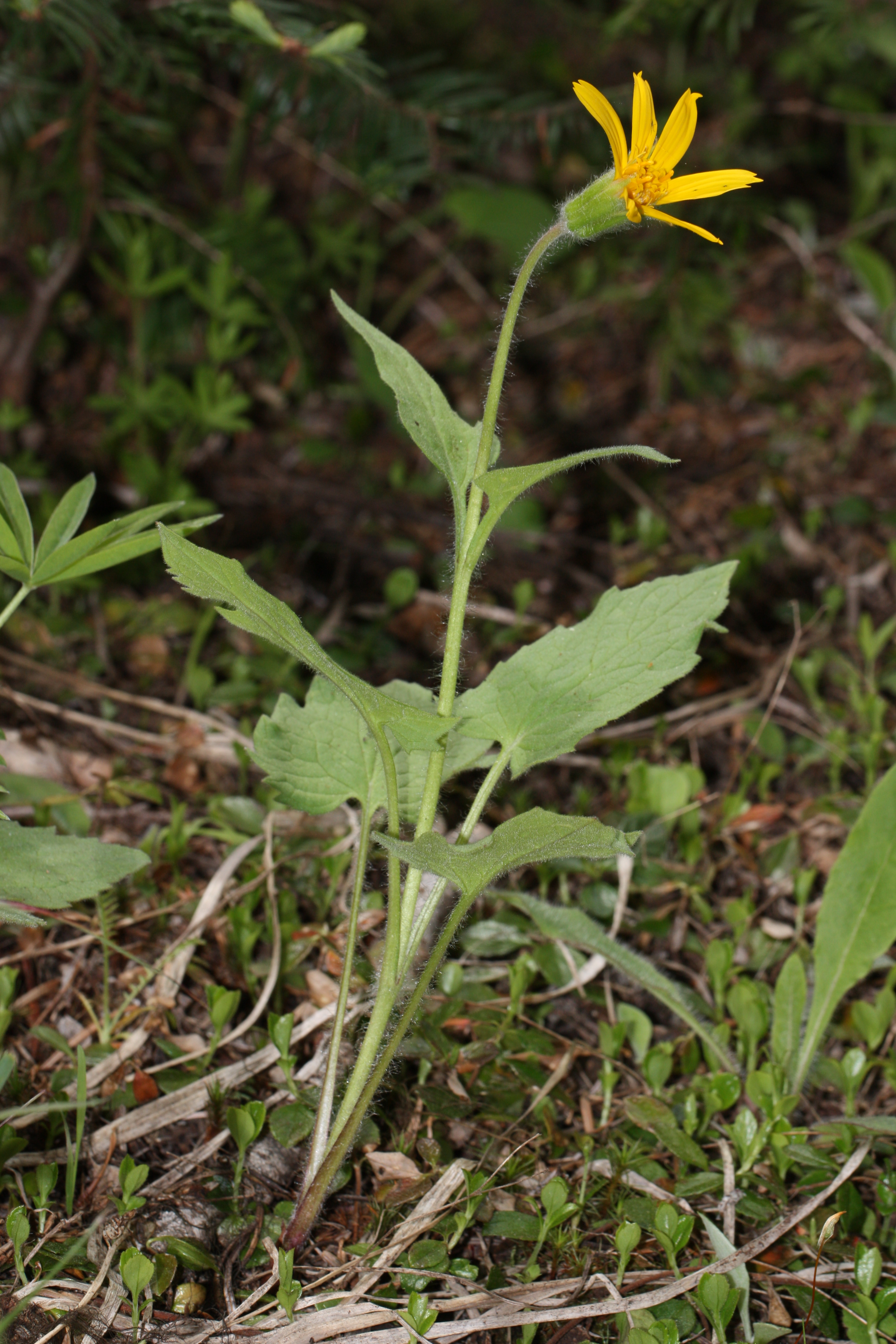
- Wenatchee Mountains, Washington

Conservation status
- Secure (NatureServe)

Scientific classification
- Kingdom: Plantae
- Clade: Tracheophytes
- Clade: Angiosperms
- Clade: Eudicots
- Clade: Asterids
- Order: Asterales
- Family: Asteraceae
- Genus: Arnica
- Species: A. cordifolia

Binomial name
- Arnica cordifolia Hook.

Synonyms
- Synonymy: Arnica abortiva Greene; Arnica andersonii Piper; Arnica austinae Rydb.; Arnica chionophila Greene; Arnica evermannii Greene; Arnica hardinae H.St.John; Arnica humilis Rydb.; Arnica macrophylla Nutt.; Arnica microphylla Walp.; Arnica paniculata A.Nelson; Arnica parviflora Greene 1901 not A.Gray 1868; Arnica pumila Rydb.; Arnica subcordata Greene; Arnica whitneyi Fernald

= Arnica cordifolia =

Species of flowering plant

Arnica cordifolia is a species of arnica in the sunflower family, known by the common name heartleaf arnica. It is native to western North America.

== Description ==
This is a rhizomatous perennial herb producing one or more erect stems reaching a maximum height of about 60 centimetres (2 feet). It has two to four pairs of leaves on the stem, each on a long petiole. The leaves are heart-shaped to arrowhead-shaped and finely toothed along the edges. The inflorescence bears one or more daisylike flower heads 5–9 cm (2–3 1/2 inches) in width, lined with white-haired phyllaries and sometimes studded with resin glands. The center of each head contains golden yellow disc florets and a fringe of 10–15 bright golden ray florets approaching 3 cm (1 1/4 in) in maximum length. The flowers usually bloom from April to June, but sometimes do so as late as September.

The fruit is a hairy achene up to 1 cm (1/2 in) long, not counting its off-white pappus. Seeds are dispersed on the wind. An individual plant can live 12 years, surviving periodic wildfire by resprouting from its long, slender rhizome afterward.

The species could be confused with the similar Arnica latifolia, from which it can be distinguished by the leaves. The leaves of A. cordifolia are larger and heart-shaped.

=== Names ===
Arnica cordifolia is frequently called heartleaf arnica, but is also sometimes called leopard's bane.

== Distribution and habitat ==
It is native to western North America from Alaska to California to New Mexico, as far east as Ontario and Michigan. It is a plant of many habitat types, including coniferous forests, and moist mountain meadows from sea level to altitudes of above 3,700 metres (12,000 ft), but most commonly between 1,200–3,400 m (4,000–11,000 ft).

== Uses ==
The dried leaves can be made into a poultice or tincture to treat strains and bruises.
