= Arnica porsildiorum =

Scientific classification
- Kingdom: Plantae
- Clade: Tracheophytes
- Clade: Angiosperms
- Clade: Eudicots
- Clade: Asterids
- Order: Asterales
- Family: Asteraceae
- Genus: Arnica
- Species: A. porsildiorum

Binomial name
- Arnica porsildiorum B.Boivin

Species of flowering plant

Arnica porsildiorum is an Arctic species of flowering plant in the family Asteraceae. It is native to Russia, Alaska, Northwest Territories and Yukon Territory.
