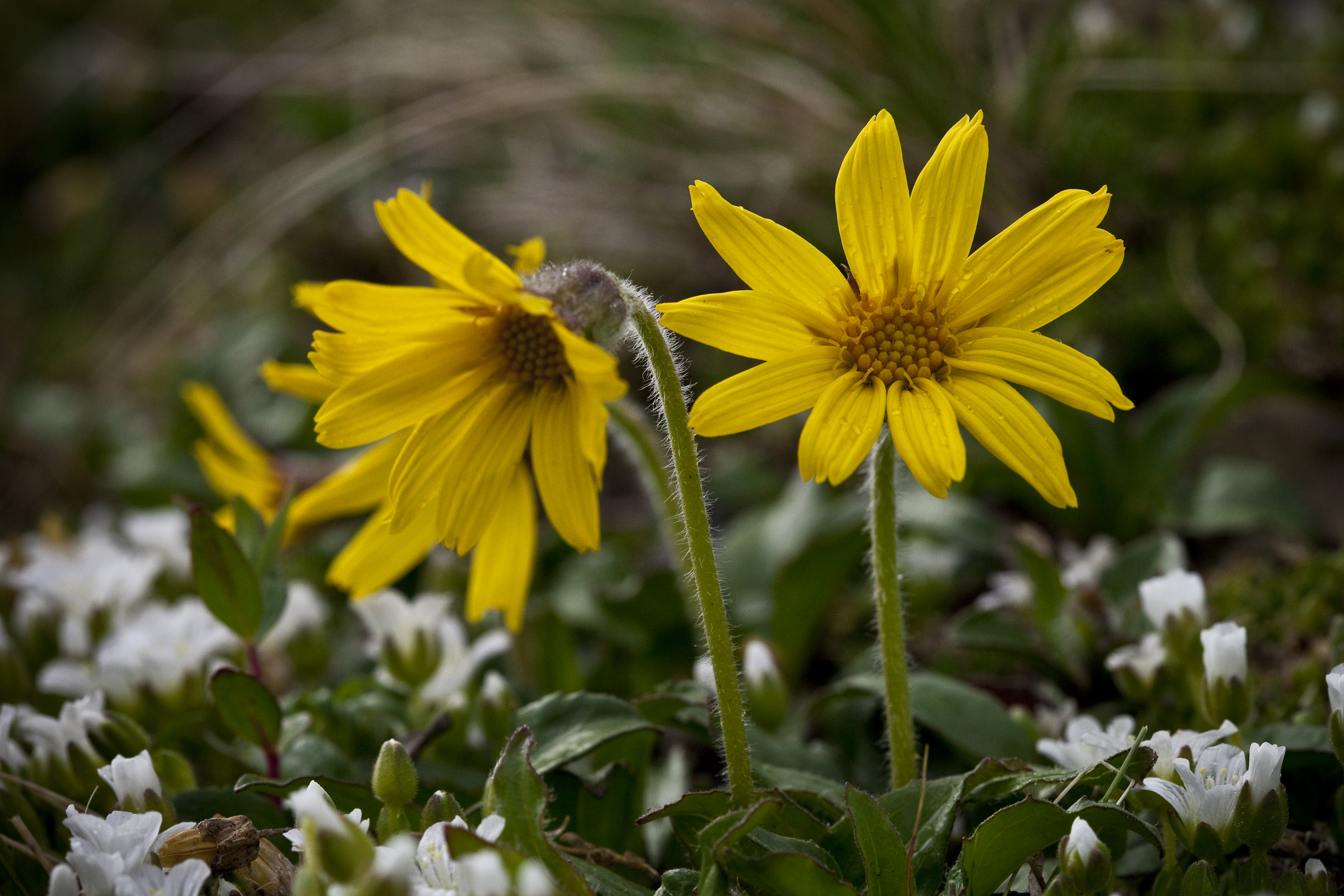

Scientific classification
- Kingdom: Plantae
- Clade: Tracheophytes
- Clade: Angiosperms
- Clade: Eudicots
- Clade: Asterids
- Order: Asterales
- Family: Asteraceae
- Genus: Arnica
- Species: A. lessingii

Binomial name
- Arnica lessingii (Torr. & A. Gray) Greene

Synonyms
- Arnica angustifolia var. lessingii Torr. & A.Gray; Arnica lessingii subsp. lessingii; Arnica lessingii subsp. norbergii Hultén & Maguire; Arnica stricta var. lessingii Torr. & A.Gray

= Arnica lessingii =

Species of flowering plant

Arnica lessingii is a Russian and North American species of arnica in the sunflower family. The common name is nodding arnica. It is found on both sides of the Bering Strait, being native to Alaska, Yukon, British Columbia, Northwest Territories, and the Kamchatka Peninsula of the Pacific Coast of Russia.
