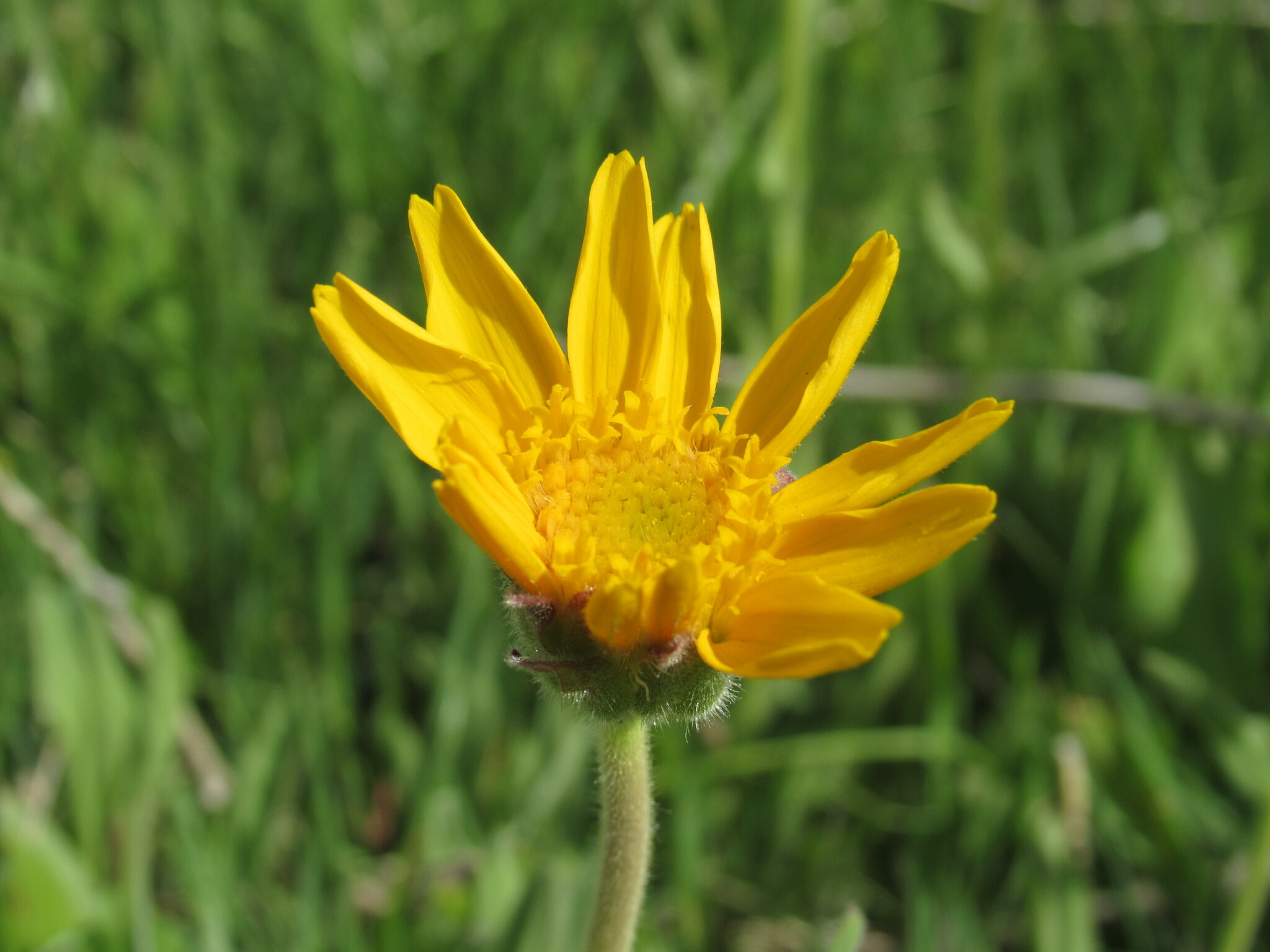

Conservation status
- Secure (NatureServe)

Scientific classification
- Kingdom: Plantae
- Clade: Tracheophytes
- Clade: Angiosperms
- Clade: Eudicots
- Clade: Asterids
- Order: Asterales
- Family: Asteraceae
- Genus: Arnica
- Species: A. fulgens

Binomial name
- Arnica fulgens Pursh

Synonyms
- Arnica monocephala Rydb.; Arnica pedunculata Rydb.; Arnica trinervata Rydb.

= Arnica fulgens =

Species of flowering plant

Arnica fulgens is a species of arnica known by the common names foothill arnica and hillside arnica. It is native to western North America, from British Columbia east to Saskatchewan and south as far as Inyo County, California, and McKinley County, New Mexico. It grows in open, grassy areas.

Arnica fulgens is a perennial herb growing from a short, tough rhizome and producing one or more hairy, glandular, mostly naked stems to heights between 10 and 60 centimeters. The leaves are mainly located around the base of the plant. They are broadly lance-shaped to oval-shaped and have tufts of woolly fibers in their axils. They are up to 12 centimeters long, and there may be a few much shorter ones further up the stem.

The inflorescence holds usually one, but sometimes 2 or 3, daisylike flower heads lined in hairy phyllaries. Each head has a center of glandular golden disc florets lined with golden ray florets which are 1 to 3 centimeters long. The fruit is an achene with a hairy body half a centimeter long and a light-colored pappus. Flowers bloom May to July. Arnica fulgens avoid heat and drought by dying back to the rootstalk and re-sprouting the next spring.

== Cultivation ==
Hillside arnica is valued by wildflower gardeners for its large yellow flowers on tall stalks. The plant author Claude Barr described the flowers as, "Elegantly finished..." They prefer to grow in rich loam soils.
