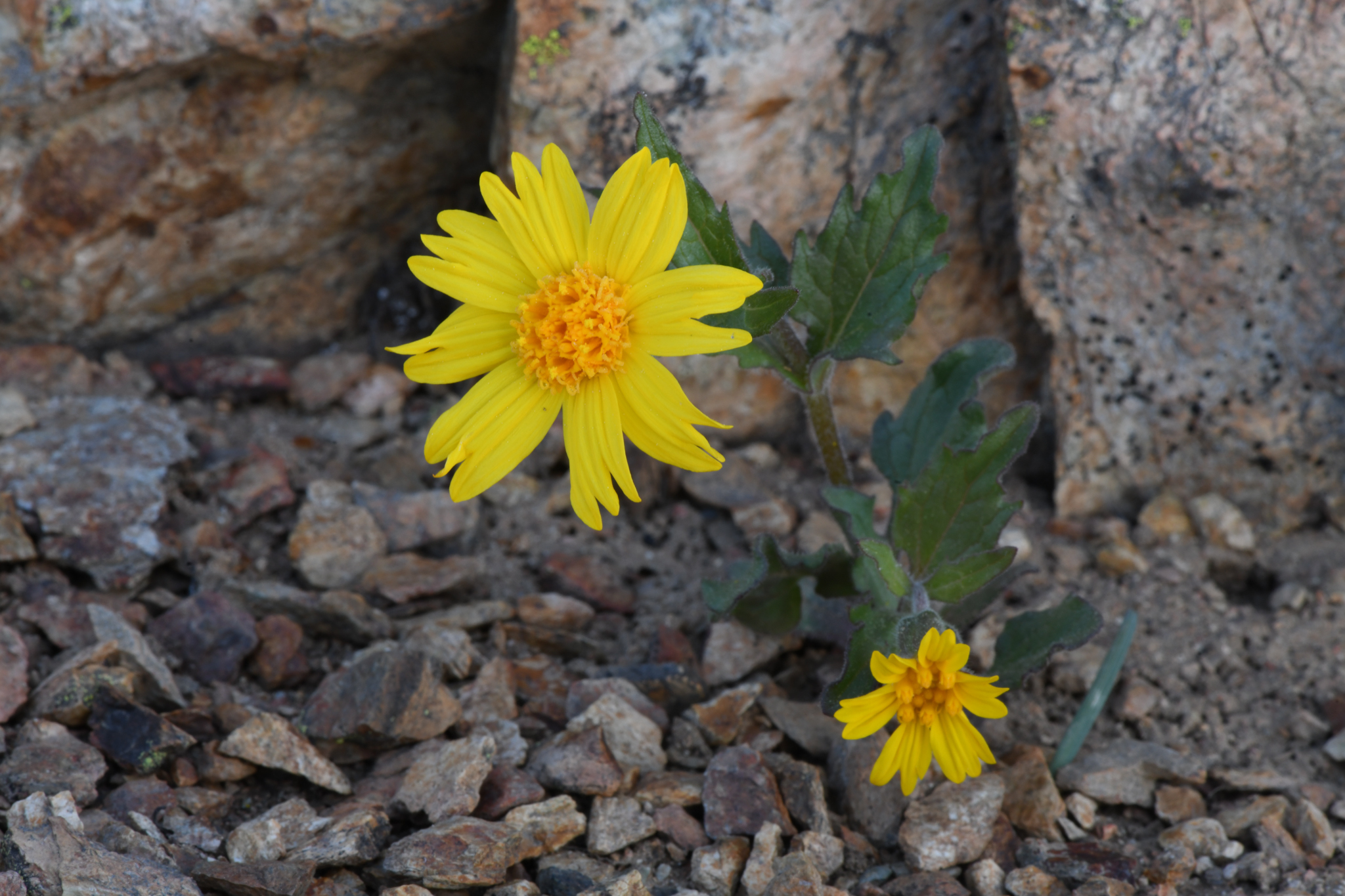

Scientific classification
- Kingdom: Plantae
- Clade: Tracheophytes
- Clade: Angiosperms
- Clade: Eudicots
- Clade: Asterids
- Order: Asterales
- Family: Asteraceae
- Genus: Arnica
- Species: A. cernua

Binomial name
- Arnica cernua Howell

Synonyms
- Arnica chandleri Rydb.

= Arnica cernua =

Species of flowering plant

Arnica cernua is a species of arnica known by the common name serpentine arnica. It is native to the Klamath Mountains of northern California and southern Oregon, where it is a member of the serpentine soils flora.

This is a perennial herb growing one or more green to purplish stems up to about 30 centimeters tall. There are 3 or 4 pairs of leaves on long petioles. The blade is oval to spade-shaped and may be several centimeters long. The inflorescence contains one or more hairy, glandular, daisylike flower heads, each with a center of yellowish disc florets and a fringe of yellow ray florets which approach 3 centimeters in maximum length.

The fruit is a cylindrical achene about 7 millimeters long which is covered in stiff hairs and has a white pappus at one end.
