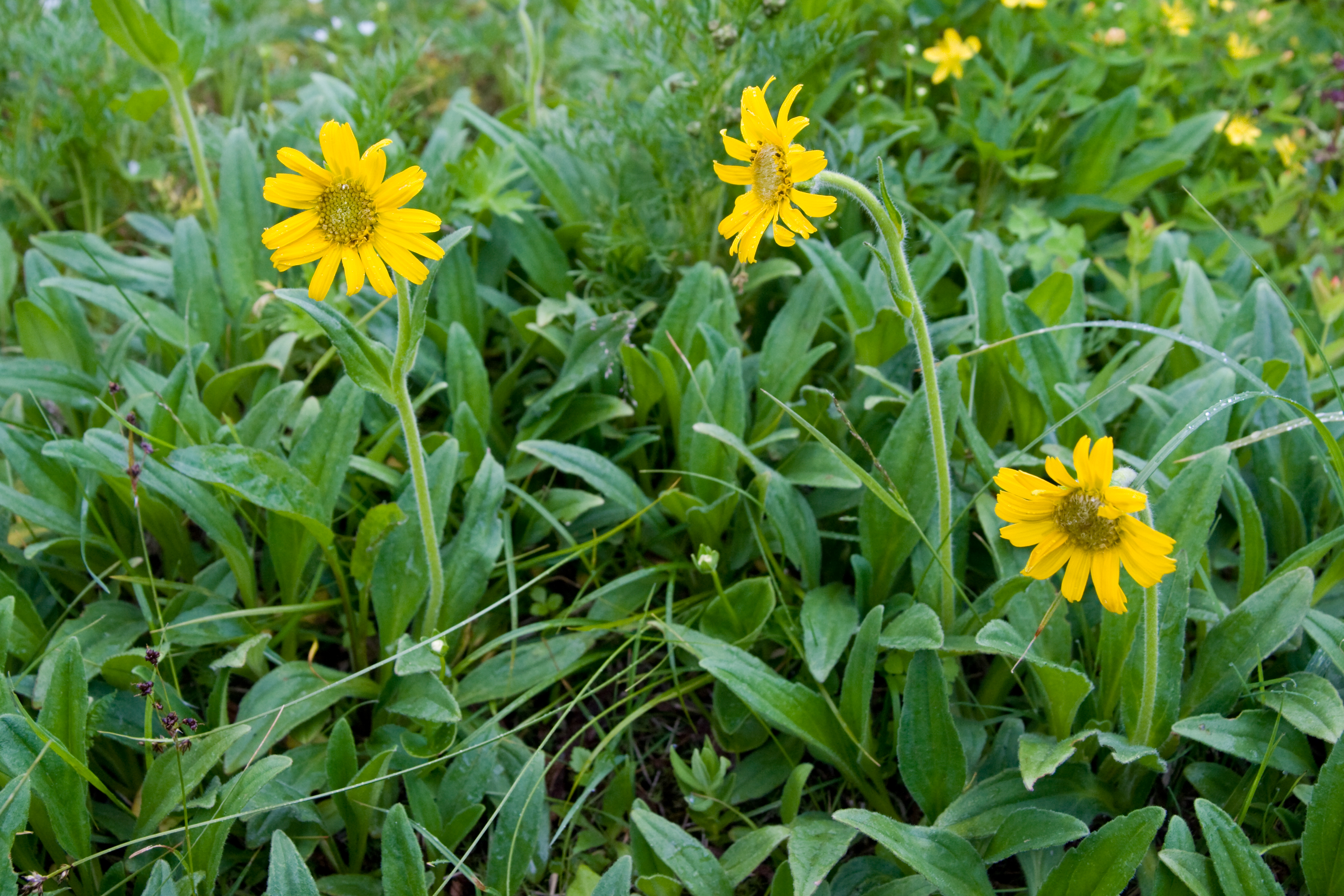
- Arnica unalascensis var. tschonoskyi

Scientific classification
- Kingdom: Plantae
- Clade: Tracheophytes
- Clade: Angiosperms
- Clade: Eudicots
- Clade: Asterids
- Order: Asterales
- Family: Asteraceae
- Genus: Arnica
- Species: A. unalaschcensis

Binomial name
- Arnica unalaschcensis Less.

Synonyms
- Arnica obtusifolia Less.; Arnica tschonoskyi Iljin, syn of var. tschonoskyi

= Arnica unalaschcensis =

Species of flowering plant

Arnica unalaschcensis, commonly known as Alaskan arnica, is a species of flowering plant in the family Asteraceae. It is found on both sides of the Bering Strait, being native to Alaska, the Pacific coast of Russia, and northern Japan. Its habitats include coastal tundra and alpine slopes.

Varieties

- Arnica unalaschcensis var. unalaschcensis
- Arnica unalaschcensis var. tschonoskyi (Iljin) Kitam. & H.Hara
