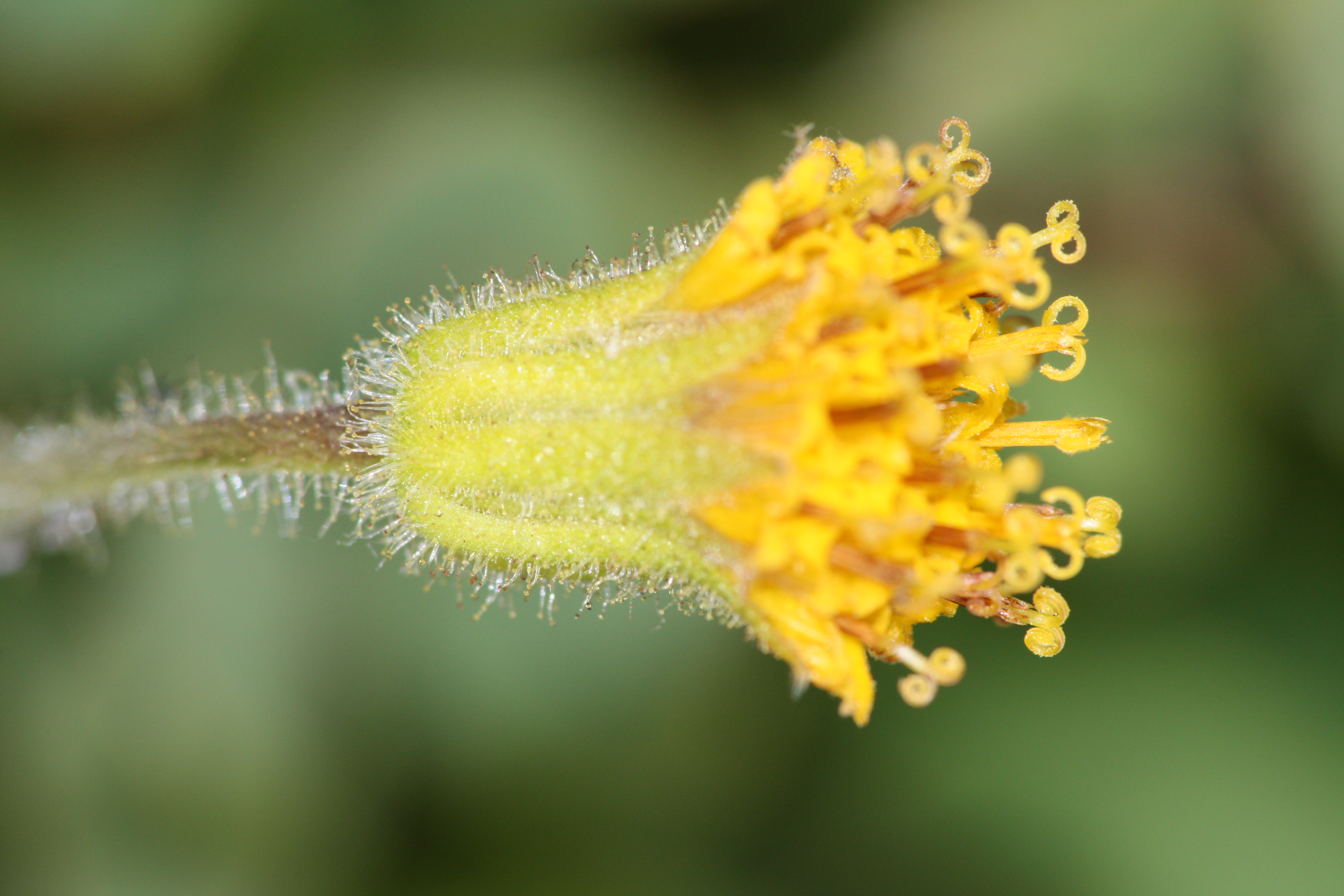
- Alpine Lakes Wilderness, Washington

Conservation status
- Secure (NatureServe)

Scientific classification
- Kingdom: Plantae
- Clade: Tracheophytes
- Clade: Angiosperms
- Clade: Eudicots
- Clade: Asterids
- Order: Asterales
- Family: Asteraceae
- Genus: Arnica
- Species: A. parryi

Binomial name
- Arnica parryi Gray

Synonyms
- Arnica sonnei Greene; Arnica angustifolia A.Gray 1862 not Vahl 1816 nor Turcz. ex Ledeb. 1845; Arnica eradiata (A.Gray) A.Heller

= Arnica parryi =

Species of flowering plant

Arnica parryi is a North American species of flowering plant known by the common names Parry's arnica or nodding arnica. It is native to western Canada (Yukon, British Columbia, Alberta) and the western United States as far south as Inyo County, California and McKinley County, New Mexico. It grows in temperate coniferous forests and alpine meadows in mountainous areas, primarily the Rocky Mountains, Cascades, and Sierra Nevada.

Arnica parryi is a rhizomatous perennial herb producing a single unbranched stem to heights between 10 and 60 centimeters. There are oval-shaped leaves around the base of the stem and a few pairs of longer, narrower petioled leaves above them. The leaves may approach 20 centimeters in length on larger individuals. The petioles, leaves, and flower stems and bracts are sparsely to densely coated with short white hairs. The hairs (trichomes) are sometimes glandular (with a bulbous secretory tip).

The inflorescence holds one to several daisylike flower heads, which nod as buds and then pull erect when the face opens. Each head has a center filled with yellow disc florets and usually no ray florets. The fruit is a cylindrical achene about half a centimeter long with a bristly tan to brown pappus.
