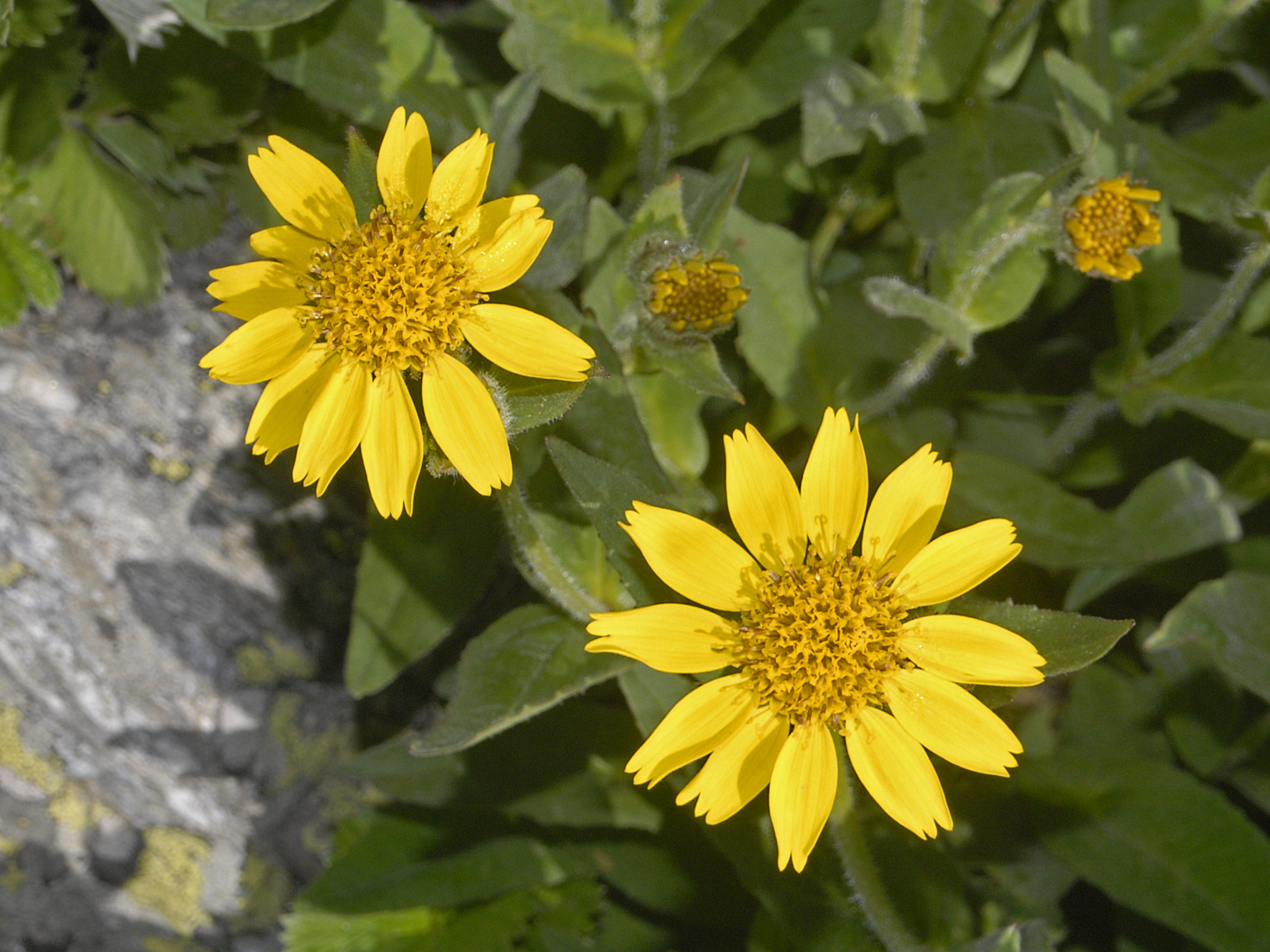
- Giardino Botanico Alpino Chanousia in the Italian Alps

Conservation status
- Apparently Secure (NatureServe)

Scientific classification
- Kingdom: Plantae
- Clade: Tracheophytes
- Clade: Angiosperms
- Clade: Eudicots
- Clade: Asterids
- Order: Asterales
- Family: Asteraceae
- Genus: Arnica
- Species: A. nevadensis

Binomial name
- Arnica nevadensis A.Gray

Synonyms
- Arnica tomentella Greene

= Arnica nevadensis =

Species of flowering plant

Arnica nevadensis is a North American species of arnica in the sunflower family, known by the common names Nevada arnica and Sierra arnica. It is native to the coniferous forests of the western United States, primarily the Cascades and Sierra Nevada (Washington, Oregon, California, Nevada).

Arnica nevadensis is a perennial herb producing one or more hairy, glandular stems up to about 30 centimeters tall. There are two or three pairs of leaves along mainly the lower half of the stem, each oval in shape with the lowest up to 8 centimeters long.

The inflorescence holds one to three daisylike flower heads lined with phyllaries coated in glandular hairs. The flower head has a center of yellow disc florets and a fringe of yellow ray florets. The fruit is an achene with a white to cream-colored pappus.
