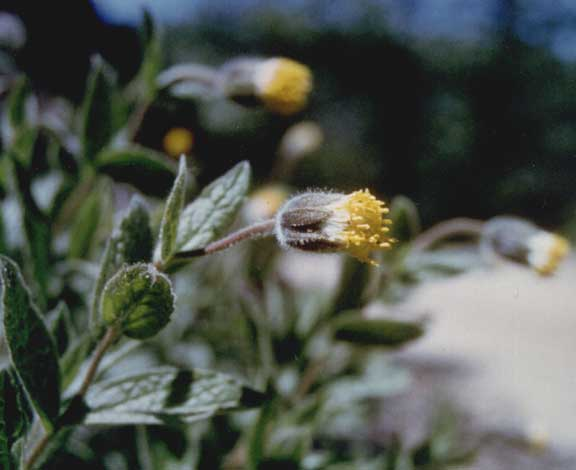

Conservation status
- Vulnerable (NatureServe)

Scientific classification
- Kingdom: Plantae
- Clade: Tracheophytes
- Clade: Angiosperms
- Clade: Eudicots
- Clade: Asterids
- Order: Asterales
- Family: Asteraceae
- Genus: Arnica
- Species: A. venosa

Binomial name
- Arnica venosa H.M.Hall

= Arnica venosa =

Species of flowering plant

Arnica venosa is a rare California species of flowering plant in the family Asteraceae known by the common name Shasta County arnica. It should not be confused with the Mt. Shasta arnica, A. viscosa.

Arnica venosa is endemic to the Klamath Mountains of northwestern California, where it can be found only in Shasta and Trinity Counties.

== Description ==
Arnica venosa is a perennial herb usually producing one or more hairy, glandular stems up to about 50 centimeters tall. There are six to ten pairs of veiny, toothed leaves along the stem, each lance- to oval-shaped and 3 to 7 centimeters long.

The inflorescence bears a single flower head lined with hairy phyllaries. The head is discoid, containing only yellow disc florets, and no ray florets.

The fruit is an achene about 7 millimeters long, not counting its white pappus.
