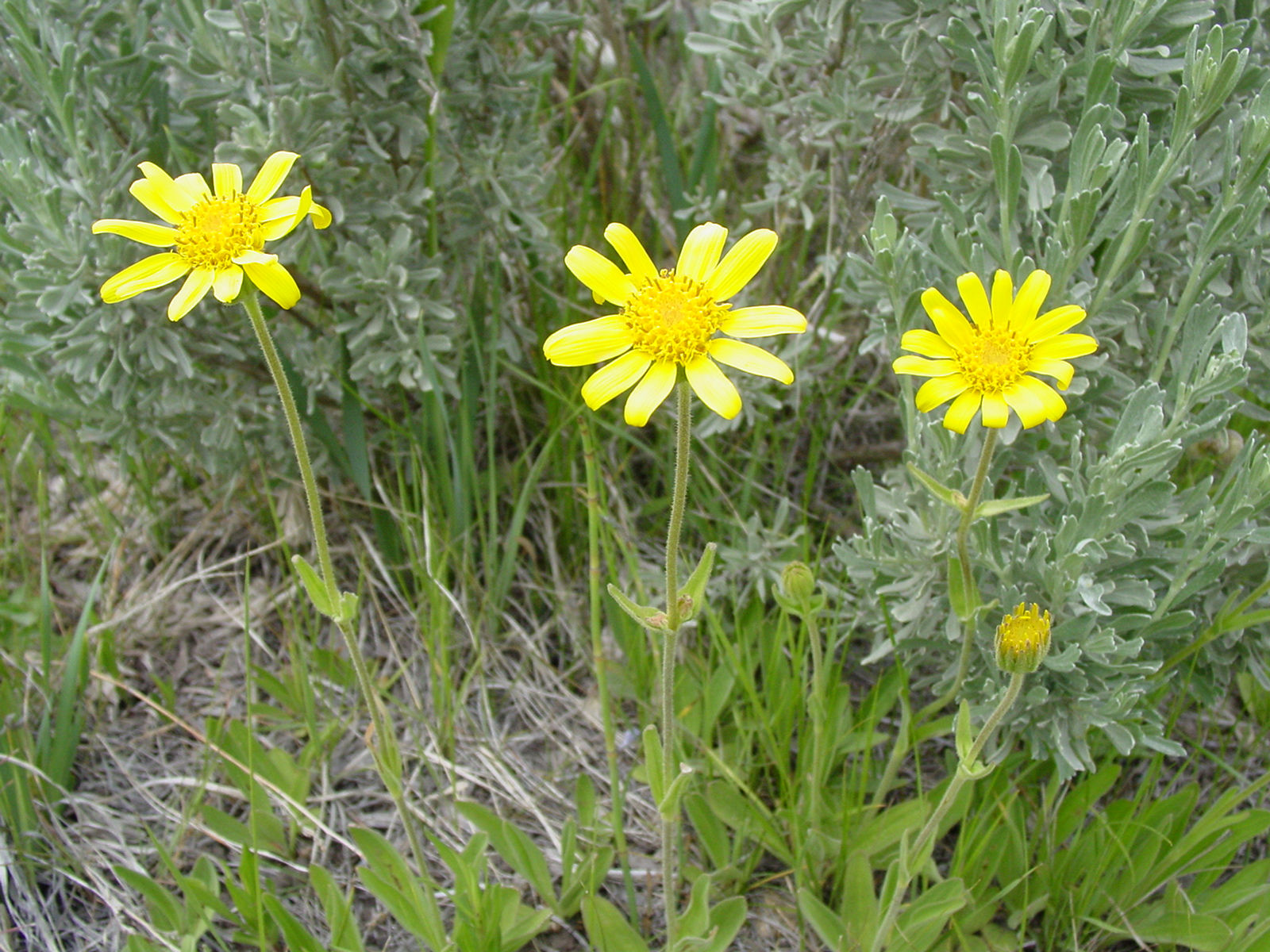

Scientific classification
- Kingdom: Plantae
- Clade: Tracheophytes
- Clade: Angiosperms
- Clade: Eudicots
- Clade: Asterids
- Order: Asterales
- Family: Asteraceae
- Genus: Arnica
- Species: A. sororia

Binomial name
- Arnica sororia Greene

= Arnica sororia =

Species of flowering plant

Arnica sororia is a North American species of flowering plant known by the common name twin arnica. It is native to Western Canada (British Columbia, Alberta, Saskatchewan) and the Western United States (Washington, Oregon, California, Nevada, Utah, Idaho, Montana, Wyoming, South Dakota). It grows in grasslands and in conifer forests, as well as the sagebrush steppe.

Arnica sororia is a rhizomatous perennial herb producing one or more hairy, glandular stems 10 to 50 centimeters (4 to 19 1/2 in) tall. There are a few to several pairs of broadly lance-shaped leaves along the stem, the lower ones borne on petioles. Leaves may reach up to 14 cm long.

The inflorescence consists of a daisy-like flower head, rarely more than one per stem. These are lined with phyllaries coated in glandular hairs. The flower head has a center of glandular yellow disc florets and a fringe of yellow ray florets. The fruit is an achene a few millimeters long with a white pappus.
