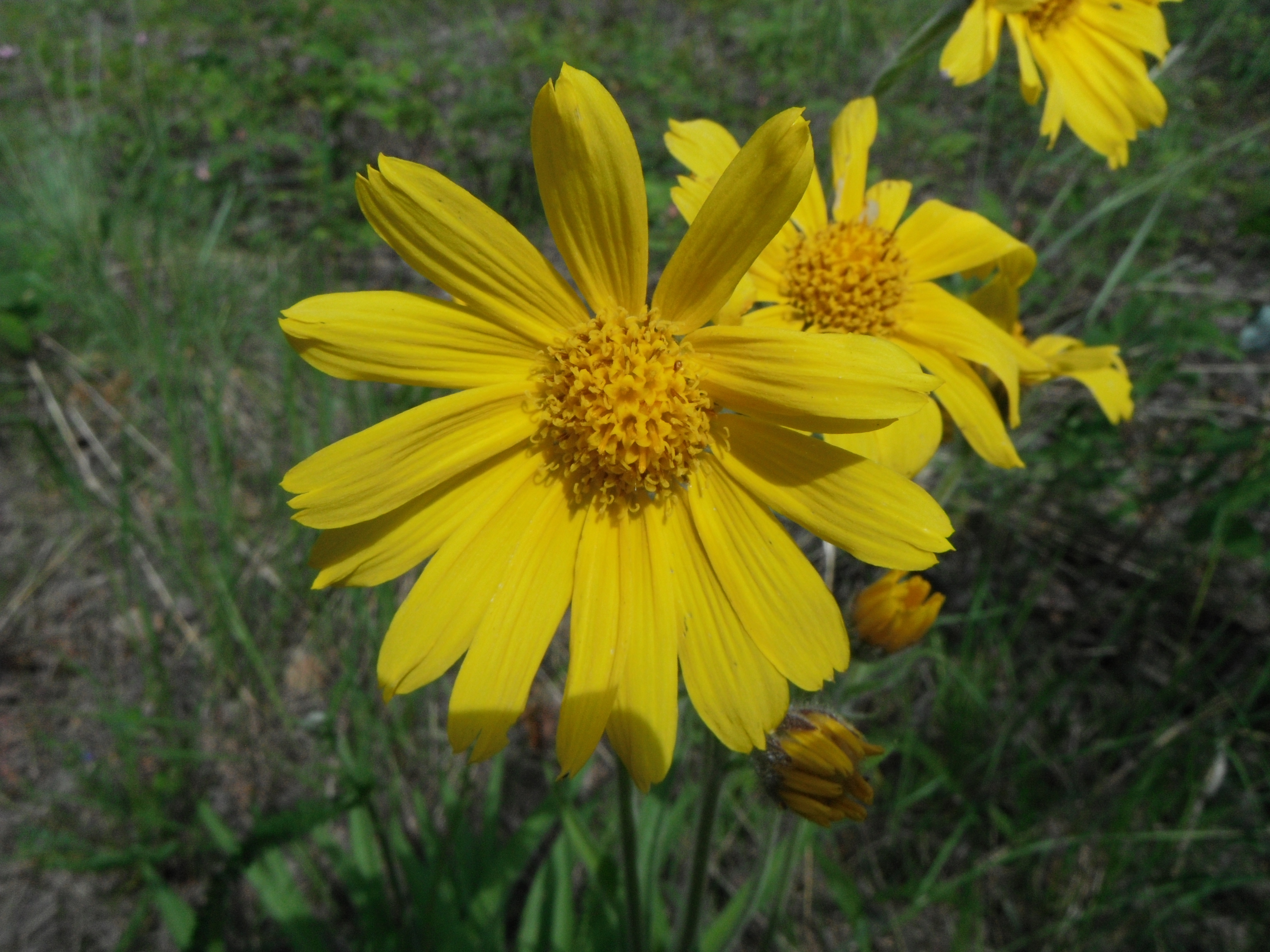

Scientific classification
- Kingdom: Plantae
- Clade: Tracheophytes
- Clade: Angiosperms
- Clade: Eudicots
- Clade: Asterids
- Order: Asterales
- Family: Asteraceae
- Genus: Arnica
- Species: A. lonchophylla

Binomial name
- Arnica lonchophylla Greene

Synonyms
- Synonymy: Arnica alpina subsp. lonchophylla (Greene) Roy L.Taylor & MacBryde; Arnica alpina var. lonchophylla (Greene) S.L.Welsh; Arnica arnoglossa Greene; Arnica chionopappa Fernald; Arnica fernaldii Rydb.; Arnica gaspensis Fernald; Arnica lonchophylla subsp. arnoglossa (Greene) Maguire; Arnica lonchophylla subsp. chionopappa (Fernald) Maguire; Arnica lonchophylla subsp. lonchophylla Greene; Arnica lonchophylla var. arnoglossa (Greene) B.Boivin; Arnica lonchophylla var. lonchophylla

= Arnica lonchophylla =

Species of flowering plant

Arnica lonchophylla is a species of flowering plant in family Asteraceae. The common names for this species includes longleaf arnica, northern arnica, and spear-leaved arnica. It has daisy-like yellow flowers that are 2.5 to 5 cm across with a yellow center disks.

== Description ==
Arnica lonchophylla is a herbaceous rhizomatous perennial growing 12 to 50 cm tall, with normally unbranched stems. The rhizomes are densely scaly. The 3 to 7 pairs of basal leaves have long petioles (leaf stalk), are three nerved, with margins that are more or less uniformly toothed. The basal leaves are 3.5 to 14 cm long and 0.5 to 3.7 cm wide. The stem leaves lack petioles and are arranged oppositely on the stem, reducing in size as they progress up the stem. It has yellow-flowered radiate heads with 3 to 8 heads per stem. Each flower head has 6 to 17 ray florets. The flower anthers are yellow. The cypselae (a dry single-seeded fruit) are gray to brown and 3 to 6 mm long. The pappus is white with ridged bristles pubescent hairs and a naked receptacle. Flowering occurs June thru August.

=== Subspecies ===
Subspecies have included:

- Arnica lonchophylla ssp. lonchophylla
- Arnica lonchophylla ssp. arnoglossa (Greene) Maguire

== Habitat ==
Arnica lonchophylla grows in dry to mesic soils, on open montane slopes and open woodlands, along gravel-bedded streams and other shorelines. It also is found on calcareous rocky outcrops, to lowland Arctic tundra; it is found from elevations of 0–1500 meters.

== Distribution ==
Arnica lonchophylla is generally a subarctic species that is found from British Columbia north to Alaska and the Yukon and east to Newfoundland and Labrador. It can also be found in the US states of Alaska, South Dakota, Minnesota, and Wyoming.

In Minnesota it is listed as a threatened species and survives as scattered isolated relict populations found around Lake Superior which provides lake effects that suit this species' need for cool summers. It is found in calcareous microhabitats on exposed rocky shorelines and cliffs.
