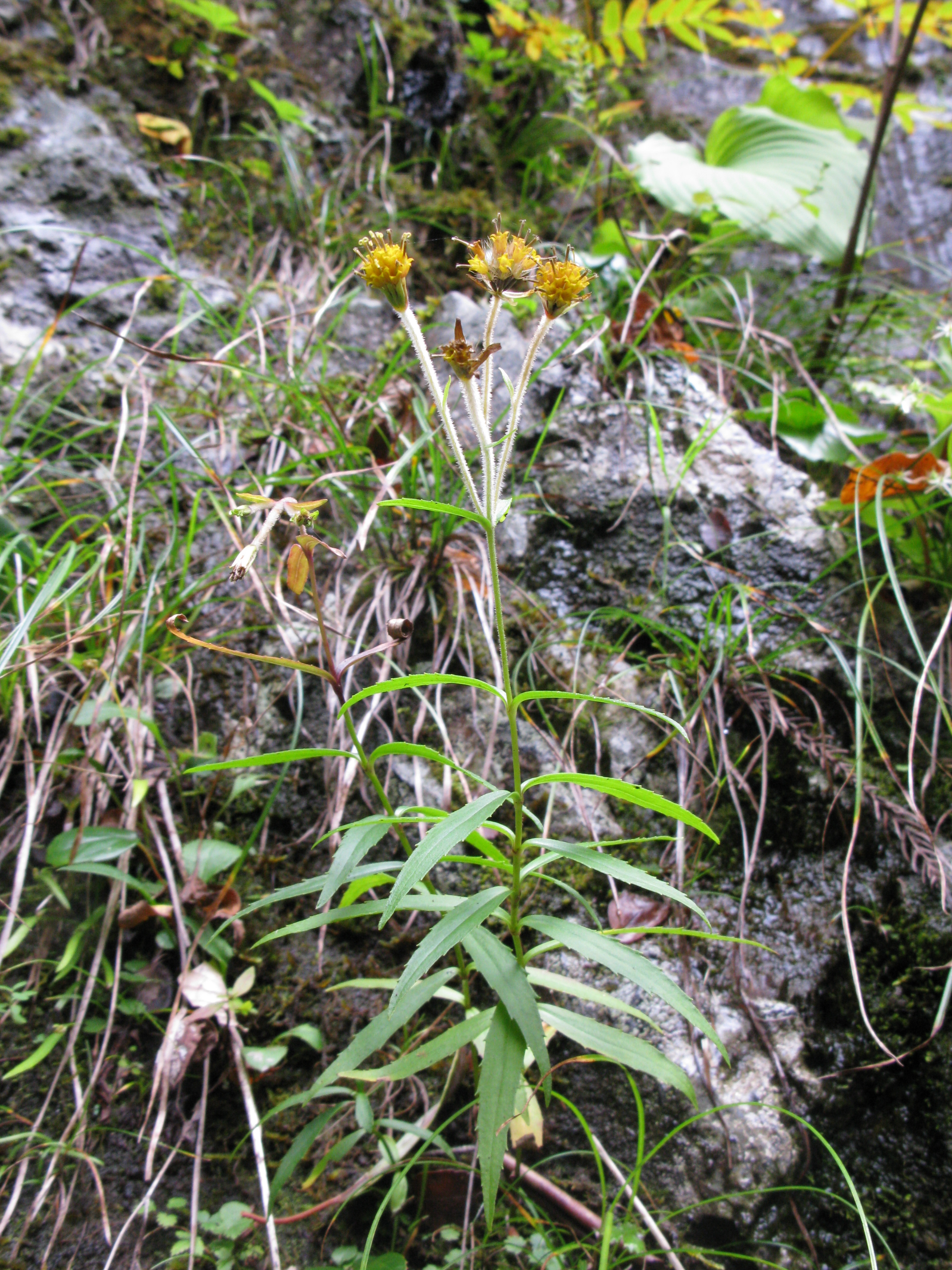

Scientific classification
- Kingdom: Plantae
- Clade: Tracheophytes
- Clade: Angiosperms
- Clade: Eudicots
- Clade: Asterids
- Order: Asterales
- Family: Asteraceae
- Genus: Arnica
- Species: A. mallotopus

Binomial name
- Arnica mallotopus (Franch. & Sav.) Makino

Synonyms
- Arnica japonicus Franch. & Sav.; Mallotopus japonicus Franch. & Sav.

= Arnica mallotopus =

Species of flowering plant

Arnica mallotopus is a species of flowering plant in the family Asteraceae. It is native to Japan.
