= Arnica sachalinensis =

Scientific classification
- Kingdom: Plantae
- Clade: Tracheophytes
- Clade: Angiosperms
- Clade: Eudicots
- Clade: Asterids
- Order: Asterales
- Family: Asteraceae
- Genus: Arnica
- Species: A. sachalinensis

Binomial name
- Arnica sachalinensis (Regel) A.Gray

Synonyms
- Arnica chamissonis var. sachalinensis Regel

Species of flowering plant

Arnica sachalinensis is an Asian species of flowering plant in the family Asteraceae. It is native to Sakhalin Island on the Pacific Coast of Russia.

Arnica sachalinensis is an herb up to 90 cm tall, spreading by means of underground rhizomes. Flower heads are yellow, with both ray florets and disc florets. It is sometimes cultivated as an ornamental.
