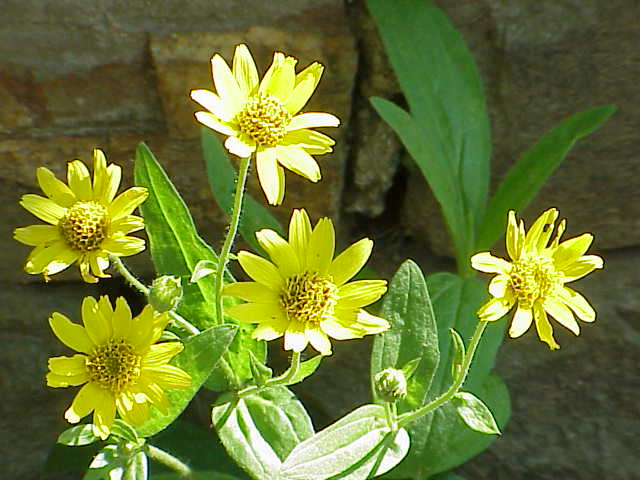

Conservation status
- Secure (NatureServe)

Scientific classification
- Kingdom: Plantae
- Clade: Embryophytes
- Clade: Tracheophytes
- Clade: Angiosperms
- Clade: Eudicots
- Clade: Asterids
- Order: Asterales
- Family: Asteraceae
- Genus: Arnica
- Species: A. chamissonis

Binomial name
- Arnica chamissonis Less.

Synonyms
- Synonymy: Arnica bernardina Greene; Arnica bruceae Rydb.; Arnica cana Greene; Arnica celsa A.Nelson; Arnica columbiana Greene Dec 1900 not A.Nelson Sept 1900; Arnica exigua A.Nelson; Arnica foliosa Nutt.; Arnica greenei A.Nelson; Arnica incana (A.Gray) Greene 1900 not Pers. 1807; Arnica kodiakensis Rydb.; Arnica lanulosa Greene; Arnica macilenta Greene; Arnica maguirei A.Nelson; Arnica ocreata A.Nelson; Arnica rhizomata A.Nelson; Arnica rubricaulis Greene; Arnica stricta A.Nelson; Arnica tomentulosa Rydb.

= Arnica chamissonis =

Species of plant

Arnica chamissonis, the Chamisso arnica, is a North American species of plants in the family Asteraceae. It is very similar to Arnica montana. Arnica chamissonis is native to North America and naturalized in parts of Europe while A. montana is indigenous to Europe.

== Distribution and habitat ==
Arnica chamissonis is native to western North America, including Alaska, and most of Canada including Yukon and Northwest Territories. Arnica chamissonis is perennial. It has a temperature minimum of −33 °F (−36 °C). They are adapted to both coarse and medium textured soils with a pH between 6.0–7.2. Since this plant uses a lot of moisture, it has a precipitation requirement of between 14–24 inches (36–61 cm). It generally prefers moist meadows and conifer forests and often grows in montane to subalpine zones, 0–3,500 metres (0–11,483 ft). Seeds are easily available and the plant can be grown in a home garden. It prefers full sun exposure and an average soil temperature of 65–75 °F (18–24 °C).

== Morphology ==
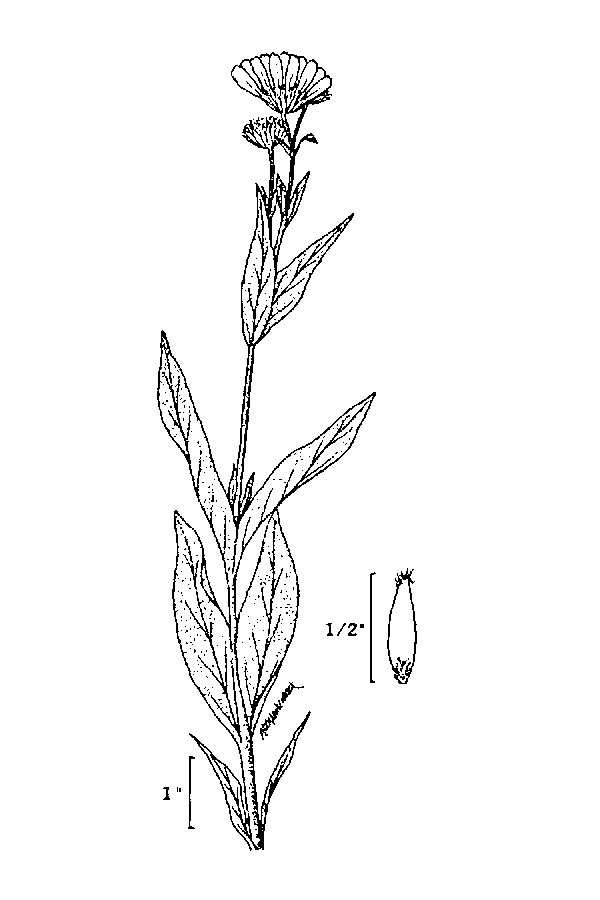

Arnica chamissonis has yellow flowers with green medium textured foliage. The leaves of the Arnica chamissonis are grouped in 4–10 pairs. It produces brown seeds and has an active growth period of the spring and summer. It has rhizomatous growth and grows at a moderate rate. Rhizomatous plants have an underground stem with small fiber-like adventitious roots. A. chamissonis has a mature height of roughly 2.5 feet (76 cm).

== Reproduction and growth ==
Arnica chamissonis has an active bloom period throughout the summer. There are approximately 400,000 seeds per pound. These individuals have a medium seedling vigor and a moderate vegetative spread rate. Seedling vigor refers to "the expected seedling survival percentage of the plant compared to other species with the same growth habit." A vegetative spread rate refers to how quickly a plant can spread through a given area. In general, A. chamissonis can be grown in a container, by using seeds or sprigs.

Both A. montana and A. chamissonis contain the toxin helenalin.

The species is named for German poet and botanist Adelbert von Chamisso, 1781–1838.
