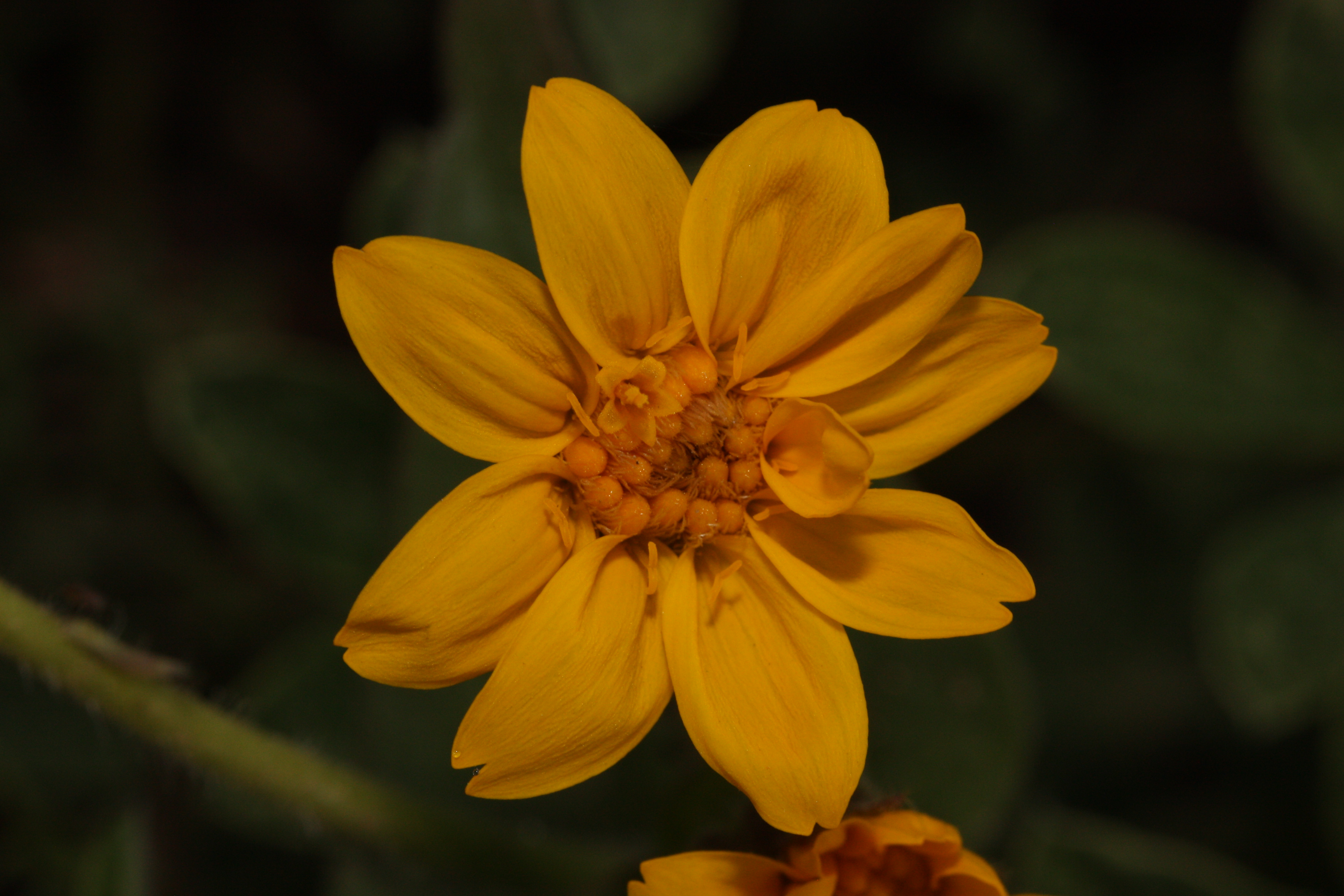
- North Cascades National Park, Washington

Scientific classification
- Kingdom: Plantae
- Clade: Tracheophytes
- Clade: Angiosperms
- Clade: Eudicots
- Clade: Asterids
- Order: Asterales
- Family: Asteraceae
- Genus: Arnica
- Species: A. ovata

Binomial name
- Arnica ovata Greene

Synonyms
- Arnica diversifolia Greene; Arnica latifolia var. viscidula A.Gray

= Arnica ovata =

Species of flowering plant

Arnica ovata is a North American species of flowering plant in the family Asteraceae, known by the common name sticky leaf arnica. It is native to western Canada (Yukon, Alberta, British Columbia), and the western United States (Alaska, Washington, Oregon, California, Nevada, Utah, Idaho, Montana, Wyoming, Colorado).

Arnica ovata is an herb up to 50 cm (20 inches) tall. Flower heads are yellow, with both ray florets and disc florets. It grows in meadows and coniferous forests in mountainous areas.
