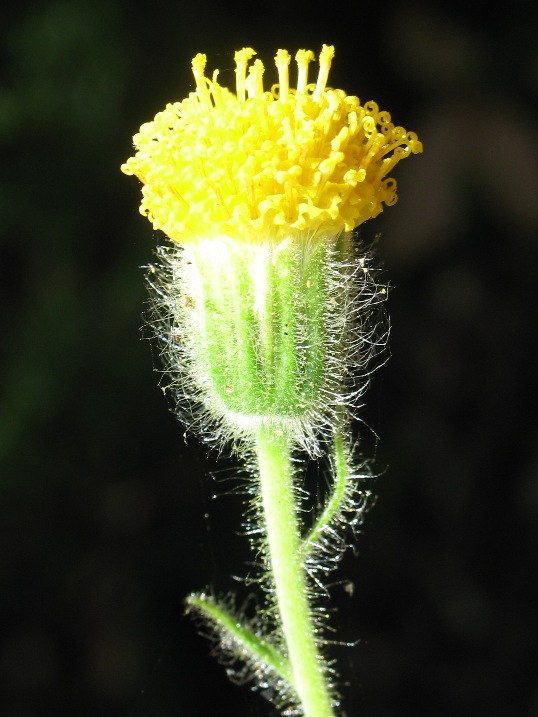

Conservation status
- Apparently Secure (NatureServe)

Scientific classification
- Kingdom: Plantae
- Clade: Tracheophytes
- Clade: Angiosperms
- Clade: Eudicots
- Clade: Asterids
- Order: Asterales
- Family: Asteraceae
- Genus: Arnica
- Species: A. discoidea

Binomial name
- Arnica discoidea Benth.

Synonyms
- Arnica alata Rydb.; Arnica falconaria Greene; Arnica grayi A.Heller; Arnica parviflora A.Gray; Arnica sanhedrensis Rydb.

= Arnica discoidea =

Species of flowering plant

Arnica discoidea is a North American species of arnica in the sunflower family. It is known by the common name rayless arnica because its flower heads have disc florets but none of the showier ray florets. It is native to the woodlands, forests, and chaparral of the western United States (Washington, Oregon, California, and western Nevada (Washoe County).

Arnica discoidea is a rhizomatous perennial herb producing a hairy, glandular stem 20 to 60 centimeters tall. There are several pairs of toothed oval to spade-shaped leaves on long petioles around the lower half of the stem. The inflorescence contains a few to many flower heads which are coated with glandular hairs. Each head contains only disc florets, but some of the florets around the edge can be expanded and resemble ray florets, making identification of the plant by its floral characteristics rather difficult.

The fruit is an achene about 7 millimeters long, not counting its light-colored pappus.
