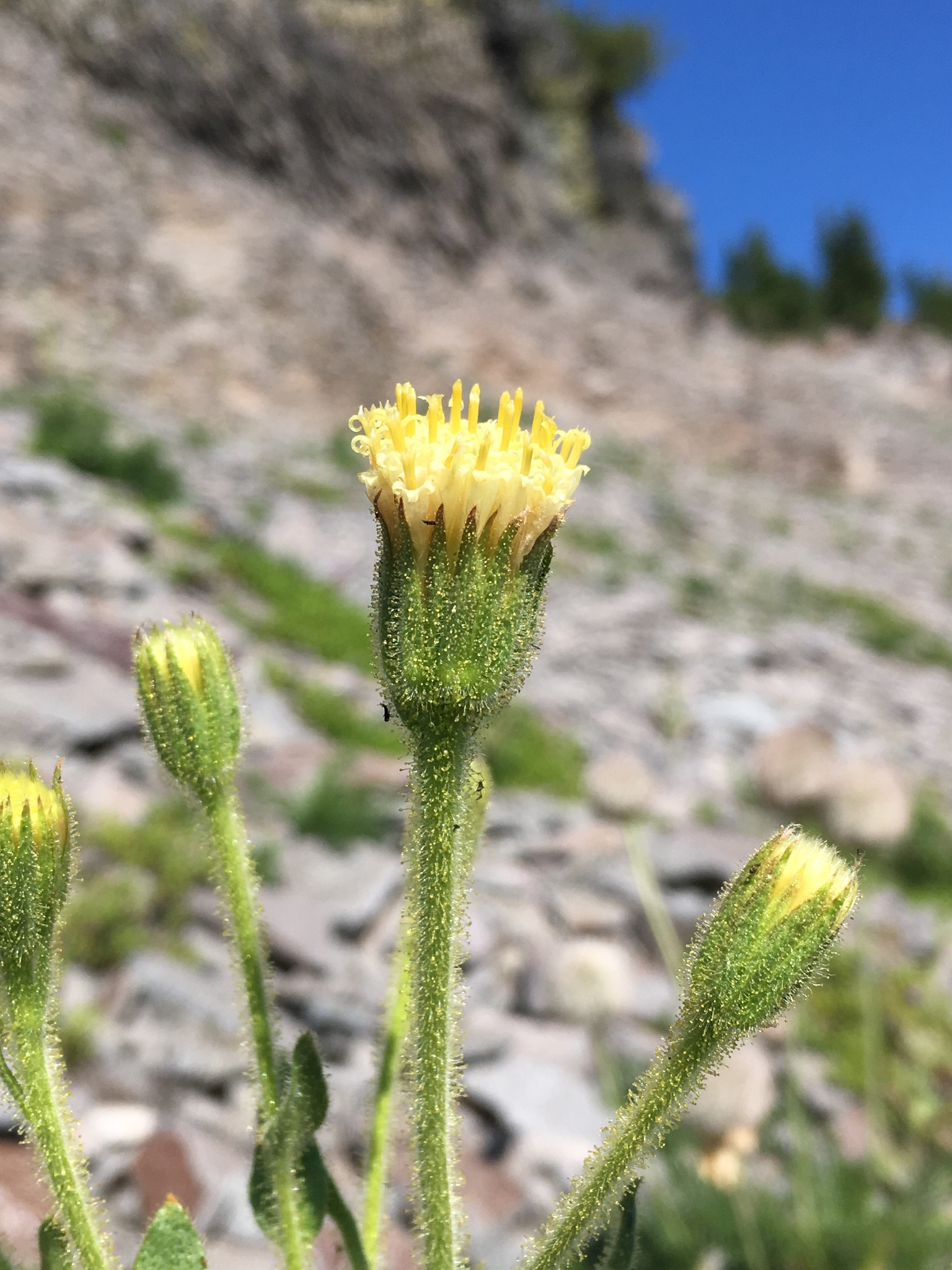

Scientific classification
- Kingdom: Plantae
- Clade: Tracheophytes
- Clade: Angiosperms
- Clade: Eudicots
- Clade: Asterids
- Order: Asterales
- Family: Asteraceae
- Genus: Arnica
- Species: A. viscosa

Binomial name
- Arnica viscosa A.Gray

Synonyms
- Chrysopsis shastensis Jeps.; Raillardella paniculata Greene

= Arnica viscosa =

Species of flowering plant

Arnica viscosa is an uncommon North American species of flowering plant in the family Asteraceae, known by the common name Mount Shasta arnica (not to be confused with the Shasta County arnica, A. venosa).

== Distribution ==
It is native to the Klamath Mountains and nearby southern Cascade Range in northern California (Shasta, Siskiyou and Trinity Counties) and southern Oregon (Josephine, Douglas, Klamath, and Deschutes Counties). It grows in subalpine to alpine habitats.

== Description ==
Arnica viscosa is a perennial herb usually producing one or more hairy, glandular stems 20 to 50 centimeters tall. There are five to ten pairs of oblong leaves along the stem each a few centimeters long.

The inflorescence bears many flower heads lined with hairy, glandular phyllaries. The head is discoid, containing only yellow disc florets, and no ray florets.

The fruit is an achene about 5 or 6 millimeters long, not counting its white to brownish pappus.
