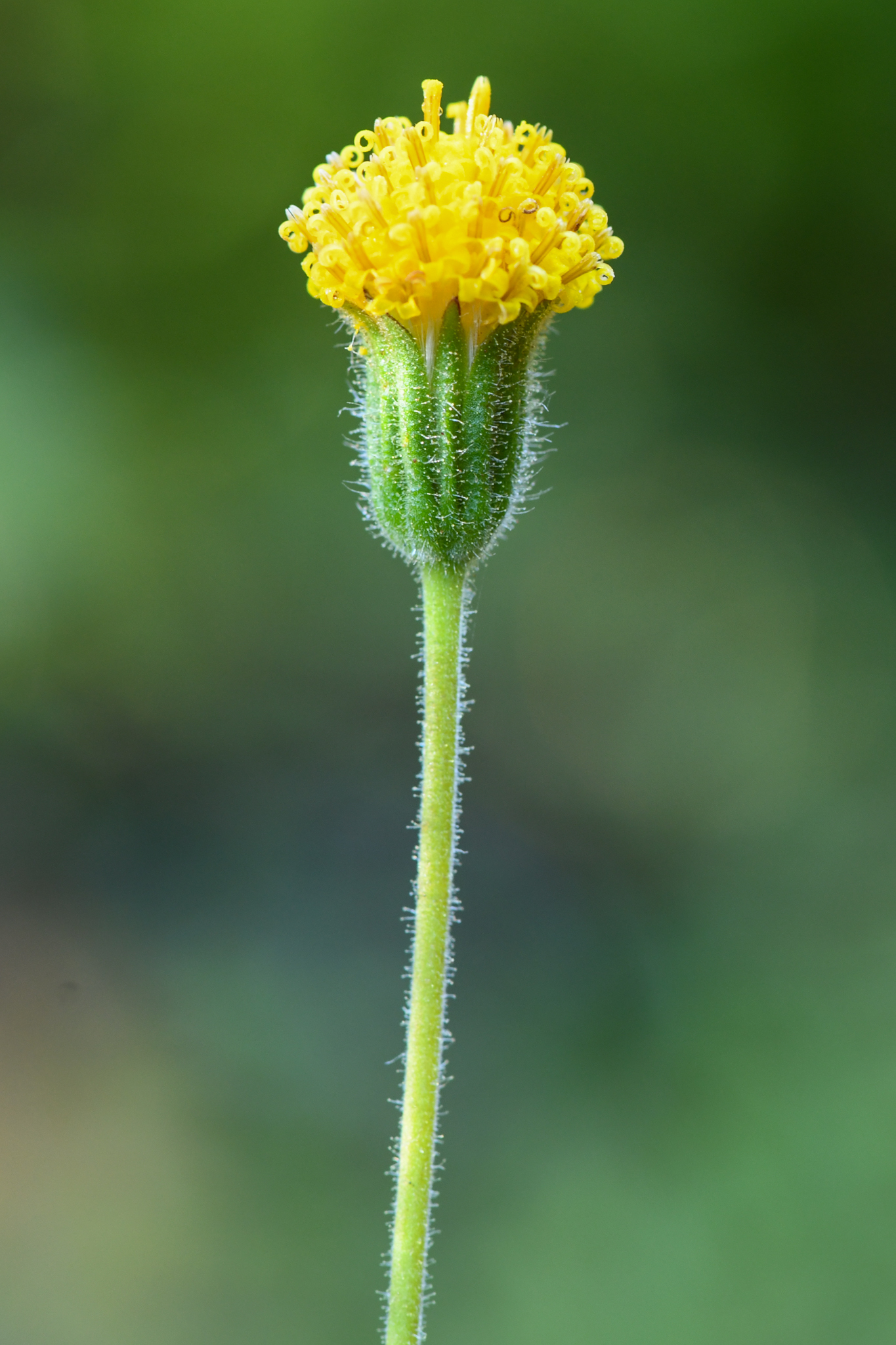

Scientific classification
- Kingdom: Plantae
- Clade: Tracheophytes
- Clade: Angiosperms
- Clade: Eudicots
- Clade: Asterids
- Order: Asterales
- Family: Asteraceae
- Genus: Arnica
- Species: A. spathulata

Binomial name
- Arnica spathulata Greene

Synonyms
- Arnica cusickii Rydb.; Arnica eastwoodiae Rydb.

= Arnica spathulata =

Species of flowering plant

Arnica spathulata is a rare North American species of flowering plant in the family Asteraceae, known by the common name Klamath arnica. It is native to the Klamath Mountains of northwestern California (Humboldt, Trinity, Siskiyou, and Del Norte Counties) and southwestern Oregon (Curry, Josephine, Jackson, and Douglas Counties). It grows in woodland habitat, almost exclusively on serpentine soils.

Arnica spathulata is a rhizomatous perennial herb producing one or more hairy, glandular stems 10 to 50 centimeters tall. There are several pairs of broadly lance-shaped leaves along the stem, and a cluster of leaves about the base of the stem. The basal leaves are up to about 15 centimeters long and the cauline leaves, those higher on the stem, are somewhat shorter.

The inflorescence holds many flower heads lined with phyllaries coated in long, white hairs. The flower head is discoid, containing only yellow disc florets and none of the showier ray florets. The fruit is an achene up to a centimeter long, not counting its white pappus.
