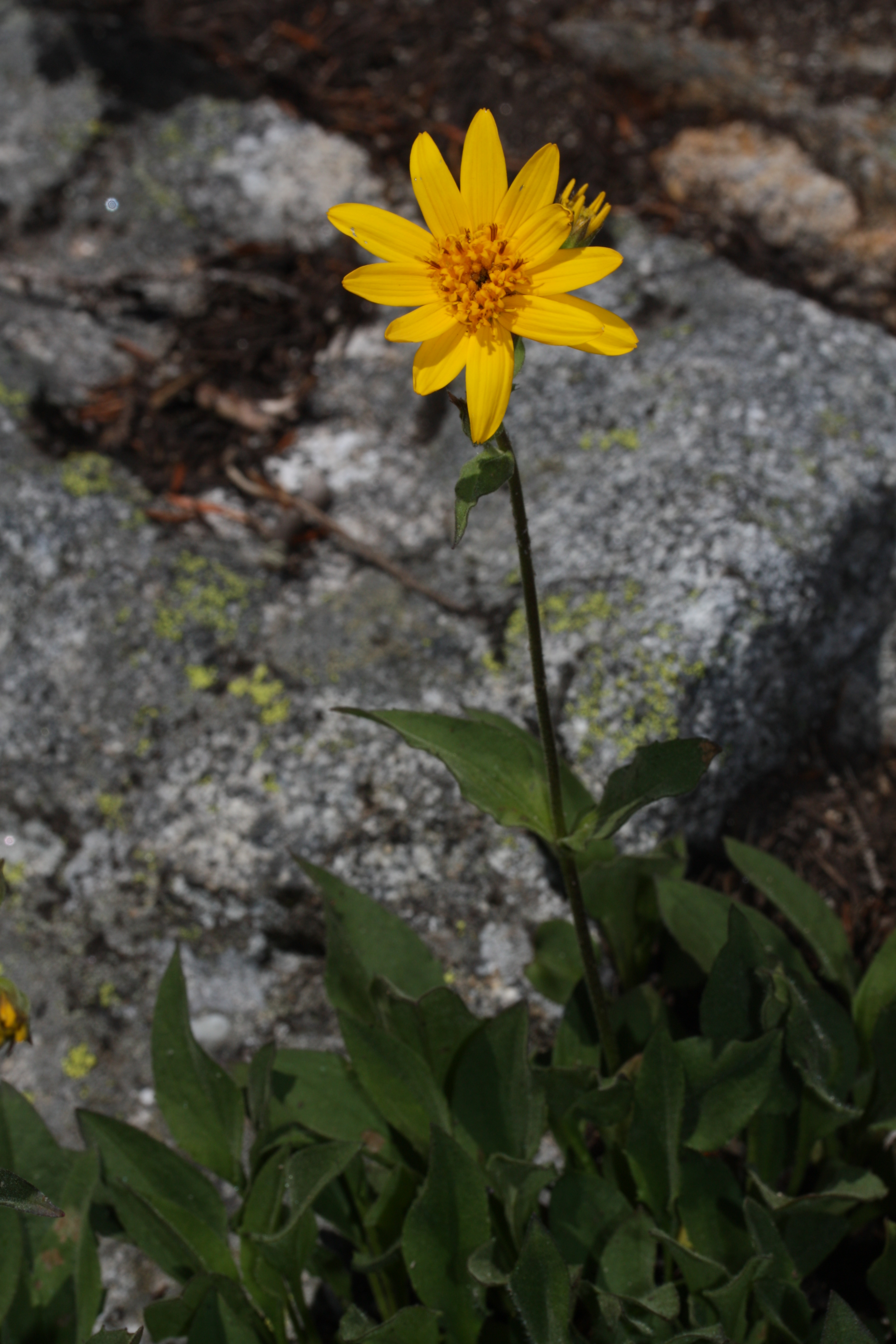
- Arnica mollis in Henry M. Jackson Wilderness

Conservation status
- Secure (NatureServe)

Scientific classification
- Kingdom: Plantae
- Clade: Tracheophytes
- Clade: Angiosperms
- Clade: Eudicots
- Clade: Asterids
- Order: Asterales
- Family: Asteraceae
- Genus: Arnica
- Species: A. mollis

Binomial name
- Arnica mollis Hook.

Synonyms
- Synonymy: Arnica amplifolia Rydb.; Arnica arachnoidea Rydb.; Arnica aspera Greene; Arnica coloradensis Rydb.; Arnica confinis Greene; Arnica crocea Greene 1900 not L. 1753; Arnica crocina Greene; Arnica merriami Greene; Arnica rivularis Greene; Arnica scaberrima Greene; Arnica silvatica Greene; Arnica subplumosa Greene

= Arnica mollis =

Species of flowering plant

Arnica mollis, the soft arnica or hairy arnica, is a perennial herbaceous flowering plant in the family Asteraceae. It is native to Canada (British Columbia, Alberta, Quebec, and the territories) and the United States (Alaska south to Tulare County, California, and Rio Arriba County, New Mexico). There may be a disjunct population of this species in Coös County, New Hampshire. The species grows in subalpine mountain habitat such as meadows and streambanks.

== Description ==
Arnica mollis is a perennial herb producing one or more hairy, glandular, mostly naked stems 15 to 70 centimeters tall. There are 2 to 4 pairs of leaves along mainly the lower half of the stem, each oblong in shape and 4 to 20 centimeters in length.

The inflorescence holds one to seven daisylike flower heads with 10–22 ray florets and yellow disc florets. The fruit is an cypselae with a brownish pappus.

== Distribution and habitat ==
Arnica mollis is found in sections of Canada (Alberta, British Columbia, Quebec, Nunavut, Yukon, Northwest Territories) and the western United States south to Tulare County, California, and Rio Arriba County, New Mexico. There may be a small disjunct population of the species in Coös County, New Hampshire.

According to the Flora of North America, plants of this species typically grow in wet meadows, conifer forests, stream banks and areas with melting snow at elevations of 1,000–4,000 m (3,300–13,100 ft) above sea level.

== Conservation ==
As of December 2024, the conservation group NatureServe listed Arnica mollis as Secure (G5) worldwide. This status was last reviewed on 13 May 2016. At the state and provincial levels, the species is listed as Apparently Secure (S4) in Montana; Vulnerable (S3) in Nevada and Alberta; Possibly Extirpated in the Northwest Territories; and No Status Rank (not assessed) across the rest of the species' range.

== Taxonomy ==
Arnica mollis was first formally named and described by William Jackson Hooker in 1834 in the Flora Boreali-Americana publication.

=== Etymology ===
The specific epithet mollis means "soft", referring to the soft hairs on the leaves. In English, this species is known by the common names soft arnica, and hairy arnica.
