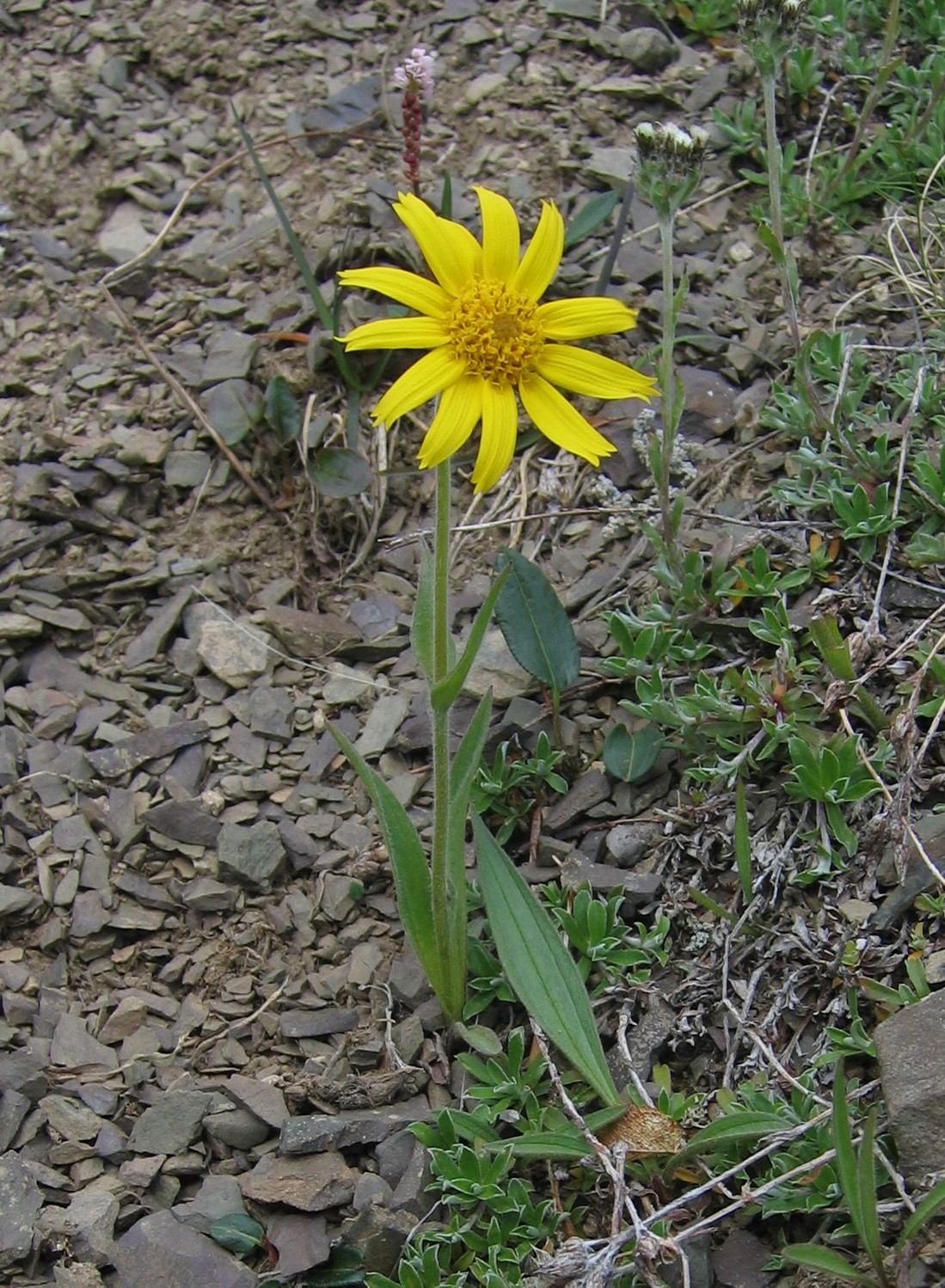

Conservation status
- Secure (NatureServe)

Scientific classification
- Kingdom: Plantae
- Clade: Tracheophytes
- Clade: Angiosperms
- Clade: Eudicots
- Clade: Asterids
- Order: Asterales
- Family: Asteraceae
- Genus: Arnica
- Species: A. angustifolia

Binomial name
- Arnica angustifolia Vahl

Synonyms
- Synonymy: Arnica alpina (L.) Olin & Ladau 1799 not Salisb. 1796 nor Willd. ex Steud. 1821; Arnica attenuata Greene; Arnica plantaginea Pursh; Arnica sornborgeri Fernald; Arnica terrae-novae Fernald; Doronicum plantagineum Poir. 1817, illegitimate homonym not L. 1753; Aliseta plantaginea Raf., syn of subsp. alpina; Arnica fennoscandica Jurtzev & Korobkov, syn of subsp. alpina; Doronicum fulgens Poir., syn of subsp. alpina; Arnica attenuata Greene, syn of subsp. attenuata; Arnica iljinii (Maguire) Iljin, syn of subsp. iljinii; Arnica alpina subsp. iljinii Maguire, syn of subsp. iljinii; Arnica lonchophylla Greene, syn of subsp. lonchophylla; Arnica pulchella Fernald, syn of subsp. tomentosa; Arnica tomentosa Macoun, syn of subsp. tomentosa

= Arnica angustifolia =

Species of flowering plant

Arnica angustifolia is an Arctic and alpine species of plants in the sunflower family, known by the common names narrowleaf arnica and Arctic arnica. It is native to colder regions in Europe, Asia, and North America (northern and western Canada, Alaska, northern Rocky Mountains). It is a perennial herb growing up to 16 inches (41 centimetres) tall. Its native habitats include bare, rocky slopes and alpine summits.

== Taxonomy ==
The publication of Arnica angustifolia as the scientific name for the species occurred in 1818 and is credited to Martin Vahl. It is classified in the genus Arnica which is in the family Asteraceae.

Subspecies

According to Plants of the World Online it has four accepted subspecies.

- Arnica angustifolia subsp. alpina (L.) I.K.Ferguson – Norway, Sweden, northern Russia
- Arnica angustifolia subsp. angustifolia – Eurasia, North America
- Arnica angustifolia subsp. iljinii (Maguire) I.K.Ferguson – Eurasia
- Arnica angustifolia subsp. tomentosa (J.M.Macoun) G.W.Douglas & Ruyle-Dougl. – Northwestern North America and Newfoundland

Arnica angustifolia has 32 synonyms of the species or one of its four subspecies.

Table of Synonyms
Name	Year	Rank	Synonym of:	Notes
Aliseta plantaginea Raf.	1837	species	subsp. angustifolia	= het.
Arnica alpina (L.) Olin & Ladau	1799	species	subsp. alpina	≡ hom., nom. illeg.
Arnica alpina subsp. angustifolia (Vahl) Maguire	1942	subspecies	A. angustifolia	≡ hom.
Arnica alpina var. angustifolia (Vahl) Fernald	1934	variety	A. angustifolia	≡ hom.
Arnica alpina subsp. attenuata (Greene) Maguire	1942	subspecies	subsp. angustifolia	= het.
Arnica alpina var. attenuata (Greene) Ediger & T.M.Barkley	1978	variety	subsp. angustifolia	= het.
Arnica alpina subsp. iljinii Maguire	1943	subspecies	subsp. iljinii	≡ hom.
Arnica alpina var. linearis Hultén	1950	variety	subsp. angustifolia	= het.
Arnica alpina var. plantaginea (Pursh) Ediger & T.M.Barkley	1978	variety	subsp. angustifolia	= het.
Arnica alpina subsp. sornborgeri (Fernald) Maguire	1943	subspecies	subsp. angustifolia	= het.
Arnica alpina subsp. tomentosa (J.M.Macoun) Maguire	1942	subspecies	subsp. tomentosa	≡ hom.
Arnica alpina var. tomentosa (J.M.Macoun) Cronquist	1955	variety	subsp. tomentosa	≡ hom.
Arnica alpina var. ungavensis (B.Boivin) B.Boivin	1972	variety	subsp. angustifolia	= het.
Arnica alpina var. vahliana B.Boivin	1948	variety	subsp. alpina	= het.
Arnica alpina var. vestita Hultén	1950	variety	subsp. angustifolia	= het.
Arnica angustifolia subsp. attenuata (Greene) G.W.Douglas & Ruyle-Dougl.	1978	subspecies	subsp. angustifolia	= het.
Arnica angustifolia var. tomentosa (J.M.Macoun) Dorn	2001	variety	subsp. tomentosa	≡ hom.
Arnica attenuata Greene	1900	species	subsp. angustifolia	= het.
Arnica chamissonis var. angustifolia Herder	1867	variety	subsp. angustifolia	= het., nom. nud.
Arnica fennoscandica Jurtzev & Korobkov	1987	species	subsp. alpina	≡ hom.
Arnica iljinii (Maguire) Iljin	1961	species	subsp. iljinii	≡ hom.
Arnica iljinii var. polycephala Revuschkin	1990	variety	subsp. iljinii	= het.
Arnica latifolia var. angustifolia Herder	1867	variety	subsp. angustifolia	= het., nom. nud.
Arnica montana var. alpina L.	1753	variety	subsp. alpina	≡ hom.
Arnica montana var. angustifolia (Vahl) Hook.	1834	variety	A. angustifolia	≡ hom., nom. illeg.
Arnica plantaginea Pursh	1813	species	subsp. angustifolia	= het.
Arnica pulchella Fernald	1915	species	subsp. angustifolia	= het.
Arnica sornborgeri Fernald	1905	species	subsp. angustifolia	= het.
Arnica sornborgeri var. ungavensis B.Boivin	1948	variety	subsp. angustifolia	= het.
Arnica terrae-novae Fernald	1925	species	subsp. angustifolia	= het.
Arnica tomentosa J.M.Macoun	1899	species	subsp. tomentosa	≡ hom.
Doronicum plantagineum Poir.	1817	species	subsp. angustifolia	= het., sensu auct.
Notes: ≡ homotypic synonym; = heterotypic synonym
