= Helenalin =

Names
- IUPAC name (8αH)-6α-Hydroxy-4-oxo-10α-ambrosa-2,11(13)-dieno-12,8-lactone
- Systematic IUPAC name (3aS,4S,4aR,7aR,8R,9aR)-4-Hydroxy-4a,8-dimethyl-3-methylidene-3,3a,4,4a,7a,8,9,9a-octahydroazuleno[6,5-b]furan-2,5-dione

Identifiers
CAS Number	6754-13-8
3D model (JSmol)	Interactive image
ChEMBL	ChEMBL338474
ChemSpider	21713
KEGG	C09473
PubChem CID	23205
UNII	4GUY9L896T
CompTox Dashboard (EPA)	DTXSID50217868
- InChI: InChI=1S/C15H18O4/c1-7-6-10-12(8(2)14(18)19-10)13(17)15(3)9(7)4-5-11(15)16/h4-5,7,9-10,12-13,17H,2,6H2,1,3H3/t7-,9+,10-,12-,13+,15+/m1/s1 Key: ZVLOPMNVFLSSAA-XEPQRQSNSA-N; InChI=1/C15H18O4/c1-7-6-10-12(8(2)14(18)19-10)13(17)15(3)9(7)4-5-11(15)16/h4-5,7,9-10,12-13,17H,2,6H2,1,3H3/t7-,9+,10-,12-,13+,15+/m1/s1 Key: ZVLOPMNVFLSSAA-XEPQRQSNBI
- SMILES: O=C/2O[C@@H]3C[C@H]([C@@H]1/C=C\C(=O)[C@@]1(C)[C@@H](O)[C@@H]3C\2=C)C

Properties
Chemical formula	C_{15}H_{18}O_{4}
Molar mass	262.305 g·mol^{−1}
- Except where otherwise noted, data are given for materials in their standard state (at 25 °C [77 °F], 100 kPa). verify (what is ?) Infobox references

Helenalin, or (-)-4-Hydroxy-4a,8-dimethyl-3,3a,4a,7a,8,9,9a-octahydroazuleno[6,5-b]furan-2,5-dione, is a toxic sesquiterpene lactone which can be found in several plants such as Arnica montana and Arnica chamissonis Helenalin is responsible for the toxicity of the Arnica spp. Although toxic, helenalin possesses some in vitro anti-inflammatory and anti-neoplastic effects. Helenalin can inhibit certain enzymes, such as 5-lipoxygenase and leukotriene C4 synthase. For this reason the compound or its derivatives may have potential medical applications.

== Structure and reactivity ==
Helenalin belongs to the group of sesquiterpene lactones which are characterised by a lactone ring. Beside this ring, the structure of helenalin has two reactive groups (α-methylene-γ-butyrolactone and a cyclopentenone group) that can undergo a Michael addition. The double bond in the carbonyl group can undergo a Michael addition with thiols. Therefore, helenalin can interact with proteins by forming covalent bonds to the thiol groups of cysteine-containing proteins/peptides. This effect can disrupt the molecule's biological function.

== Chemical derivatives ==
There are several derivatives of helenaline known within the same sesquiterpene lactone group; pseudoguaianolides. Most of these derivatives occur naturally, such as the compound dihydrohelenalin, but there are also some semi-synthetic derivatives known, such as 2β-(S-glutathionyl)-2,3-dihydrohelenalin. In general, most derivatives are more toxic than helenalin itself. Among these, derivatives with the shortest ester groups are most likely to contain a higher toxicity. Other derivatives include 11α,13-dihydrohelenalin acetate, 2,3-dehydrohelenalin and 6-O-isobutyrylhelenalin. The molecular conformation differs between helenalin and its derivatives, which affects the lipophilicity and the accessibility of the Michael addition sites. Poorer accessibility results in a compounds with lower toxicity. Another possibility is that a derivative lacking one of the reactive groups, such as the cyclopentenone group, may have a lower toxicity.

== Some biochemical effects of helenalin ==
Helenalin can target the p65 subunit (also called RelA) of the transcription factor NF-κB. It can react with Cys38 in RelA by Michael addition. Both reactive groups, α-methylene-γ-butyrolactone and cyclopentene, can react with this cysteine. It was also found that helenalin can inhibit human telomerase, a ribonucleoprotein complex, by Michael addition. In this case also, both reactive groups of helenalin can interact with the thiol group of a cysteine and inhibit the telomerase activity. Helenalin inhibits the formation of leukotrienes in human blood cells by inhibiting LTC4 synthase activity. Helenalin reacts with its cyclopentenone ring to the thiol group of the synthase.

== Metabolism ==
Helenalin inhibits cytochrome P450 enzymes by reacting with thiol groups, resulting in inhibition of the mixed-function oxidase system. These effects are important for the cytotoxicity of helenalin. The levels of glutathione, which contains sulfhydryl groups, are reduced in helenaline-treated cells, further increasing the toxicity of helenalin. Depending on the dose of helenalin, thiol-bearing compounds such as glutathione may provide some protection to cells from helenalin toxicity. It was also seen that helenalin increase CPK and LDH activities in serum and that it inhibits multiple enzymes of the liver involved in triglyceride synthesis. Therefore, helenaline causes acute liver toxicity, accompanied by a decrease in cholesterol levels.

Helenalin also suppresses essential immune functions, such as those mediated by activated CD4^{+} T-cells, by multiple mechanisms.

== In vitro anti-inflammatory and anti-neoplastic effects ==
Helenalin and some of its derivatives have been shown to have potent anti-inflammatory and anti-neoplastic effects in vitro. Some studies have suggested that the inhibition by helenalin of platelet leukotriene C4 synthase, telomerase activity and transcription factor NF-κB contributes to helenalin's in vitro anti-inflammatory and anti-neoplastic activity . The dose used varied per study. There is currently no in vivo evidence regarding helenalin's anti-inflammatory and anti-tumour effects, if any. The efficacy of helenalin for treatment of pain and swelling, when applied topically, is not supported by the current available evidence at doses of 10% or lower. For doses higher than 10%, more research is required whether those remain safe and are more efficient than the current available medications.

== Application ==
In former times, plant extracts containing helenalin were used as a herbal medicine for the treatment of sprains, blood clots, muscle strain and rheumatic complaints. Currently helenalin is used topically in homeopathic gels and microemulsions. Helenalin is not FDA-approved for medical application.

== Toxicity ==
When applied topically on humans, helenalin can cause contact dermatitis in sensitive individuals. However, it is considered generally safe when applied this way. Oral administration of large doses of helenalin can cause gastroenteritis, muscle paralysis, and cardiac and liver damage. The toxicity of helenalin was studied in mammalian species such as mice, rat, rabbit and sheep, where the oral LD_{50} of helenalin was established between 85 and 150 mg/kg. It was shown in a mouse model that helenalin caused reduced levels of cholesterol. In a rat model, alcohol hepatic injury was prevented by helenalin administration. Parenteral administration showed a higher toxic effect when compared to oral administration.

== Pharmacology ==
Helenalin has a variety of observed effects in vitro including anti-inflammatory and antitumour activities. Helenalin has been shown to selectively inhibit the transcription factor NF-κB, which plays a key role in regulating immune response, through a unique mechanism. In vitro, it is also a potent, selective inhibitor of human telomerase—which may partially account for its antitumor effects—has anti-trypanosomal activity, and is toxic to Plasmodium falciparum.

Animal and in vitro studies have also suggested that helenalin can reduce the growth of Staphylococcus aureus and reduce the severity of S. aureus infection.
