= Edith May Farr =

American botanist (1864–1956)

Edith May Farr (1864–1956) was an American botanist noted for her study of Rocky Mountain and Canadian flora. Originally from Philadelphia, she was active collecting plants in the Selkirk Range and in the southern Canadian Rockies. In 1904, she collected specimens for the University of Pennsylvania in the Rocky Mountains with Mary Schäffer Warren and Olive S. Day.

== Publications ==
- Farr, Edith May (1907). Contributions to a catalogue of the flora of the Canadian Rocky Mountains and the Selkirk Range. Philadelphia: University of Pennsylvania. hdl:2027/hvd.32044106346042.
