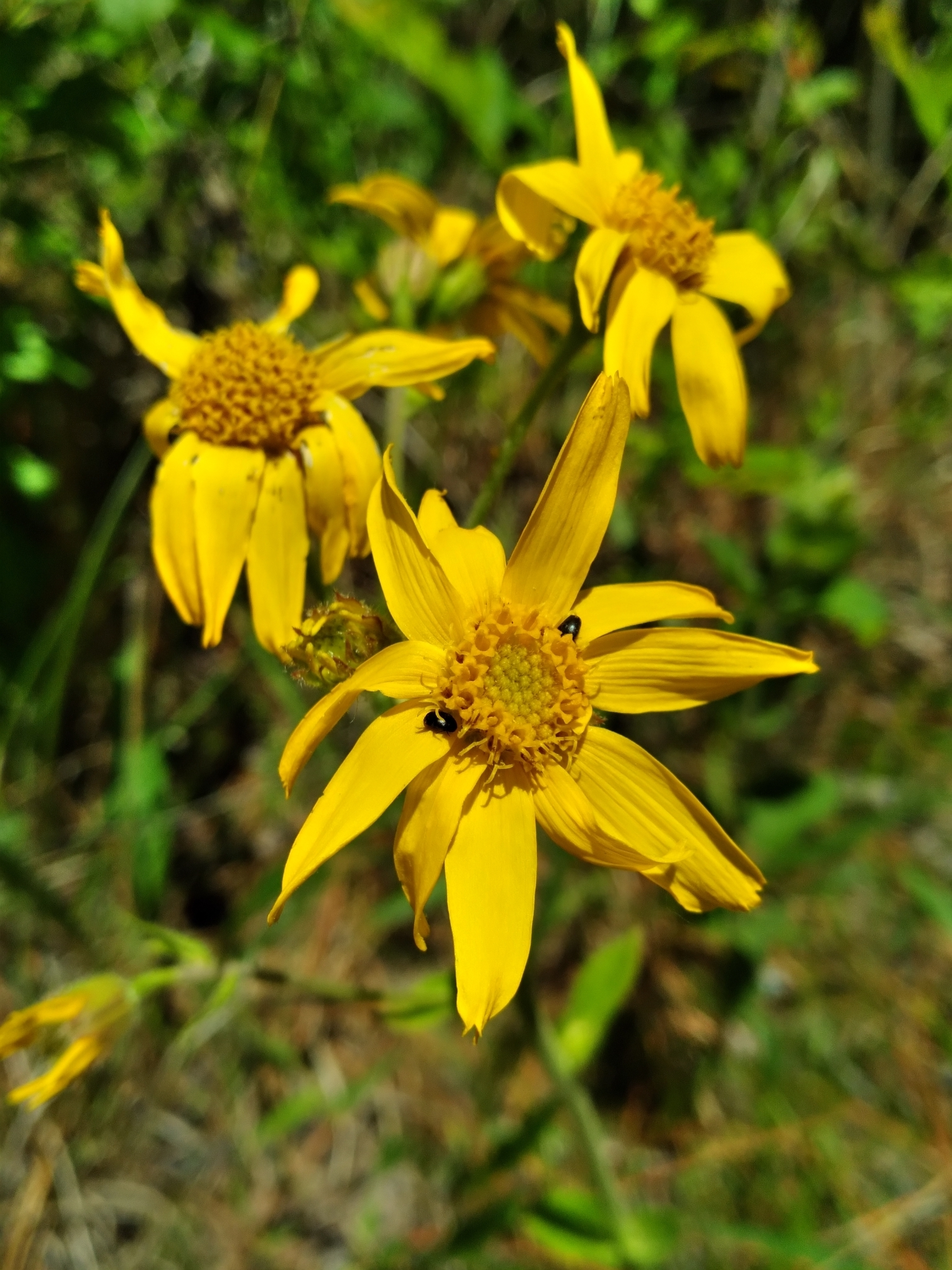

Scientific classification
- Kingdom: Plantae
- Clade: Tracheophytes
- Clade: Angiosperms
- Clade: Eudicots
- Clade: Asterids
- Order: Asterales
- Family: Asteraceae
- Genus: Arnica
- Species: A. acaulis

Binomial name
- Arnica acaulis (Walter) Britton, Sterns & Poggenb.

Synonyms
- Synonymy: Arnica claytonii Pursh; Arnica nudicaulis (Michx.) Nutt.; Arnica nudicaulis Elliott; Doronicum acaule Walter; Doronicum claytoni Poir.; Doronicum nudicaule Michx.; Grammarthron oppositifolium Cass.

= Arnica acaulis =

Species of flowering plant

Arnica acaulis is a North American species of plants in the sunflower family, known by the common name common leopardbane. It is native to the southeastern and east-central parts of the United States, from Alabama and Florida north to New Jersey and Pennsylvania.
