= List of flora of Utah =

This is a list of flora of Utah, a state in the western United States, listed alphabetically by family. As of 2018, there are 3,930 species of plants in Utah, with 3,128 of those being indigenous and 792 being introduced through various means.

== Plants sorted by family ==
Each entry lists the scientific name first (sorted alphabetically), then one or more common names for the plant (if any). Flora that have been introduced to the state are indicated with an † at the right of the scientific name. Entries are otherwise native. Entries marked with ‡ are considered invasive or noxious per the official list of noxious weeds maintained by the Utah Department of Agriculture and Food, though nine of those are not known to exist in Utah and have therefore not been included here.

=== Amaranthaceae ===
- Allenrolfea occidentalis – iodine bush
- Atriplex argentea – silverscale saltbush, silver orache
- Atriplex canescens – chamiso, chamiza, four-wing saltbush
- Atriplex confertifolia – shadscale
- Atriplex elegans – wheelscale saltbush, Mecca orach, wheelscale
- Atriplex garrettii – Garrett's saltbush
- Atriplex hymenelytra – desert holly
- Atriplex lentiformis – quail bush, big saltbrush, big saltbush, quailbrush, lenscale, len-scale saltbush, white thistle
- Atriplex nuttallii – Nuttall's saltbush
- Atriplex phyllostegia – arrowscale, leafcover saltweed, Truckee orach
- Atriplex polycarpa – allscale, cattle spinach, allscale saltbush, cattle saltbush
- Atriplex robusta
- Atriplex truncata – wedgeleaf saltbush, wedgescale, wedge orach
- Blitum bonus-henricus (also Chenopodium bonus-henricus)† – Good-King-Henry, poor-man's asparagus, perennial goosefoot, Lincolnshire spinach, Markery, English mercury, mercury goosefoot
- Blitum capitatum (or Chenopodium capitatum) – blite goosefoot, strawberry goosefoot, strawberry spinach, Indian paint, Indian ink
- Blitum virgatum (or Chenopodium foliosum)† – leafy goosefoot
- Chenopodiastrum murale (or Chenopodium murale) – nettle-leaved goosefoot, Australian-spinach, salt-green, sowbane
- Chenopodium album† – lamb's quarters, melde, goosefoot, manure weed, wild spinach, fat-hen, white goosefoot
- Chenopodium atrovirens – pinyon goosefoot, dark goosefoot
- Chenopodium berlandieri – pitseed goosefoot, huauzontle, lamb's quarters, lambsquarters
- Chenopodium desiccatum – aridland goosefoot, slimleaf goosefoot
- Chenopodium fremontii – Frémont's goosefoot
- Chenopodium graveolens (or Dysphania graveolens)† – fetid goosefoot
- Chenopodium hians – hians goosefoot, gaping goosefoot
- Chenopodium humile† – marshland goosefoot
- Chenopodium incanum – mealy goosefoot
- Chenopodium leptophyllum – narrowleaf goosefoot
- Chenopodium overi – Over's goosefoot
- Chenopodium pratericola – desert goosefoot
- Chenopodium salinum – Rocky Mountain goosefoot
- Chenopodium simplex – mapleleaf goosefoot
- Chenopodium subglabrum – smooth goosefoot
- Chenopodium watsonii – Watson's goosefoot
- Dysphania ambrosioides† – wormseed, Jesuit's tea, Mexican-tea, payqu, paico, epazote, mastruz, herba sanctæ Mariæ
- Dysphania botrys† – Jerusalem oak goosefoot, sticky goosefoot, feathered geranium
- Grayia spinosa – hop sage, spiny hop sage
- Halogeton glomeratus† – saltlover, Aral barilla, and halogeton
- Krascheninnikovia lanata – winterfat
- Oxybasis chenopodioides (or Chenopodium chenopodioides) – low goosefoot
- Oxybasis rubra (or Chenopodium rubrum) – red goosefoot, coastblite goosefoot, on’-tǐm-pi-wa-tsǐp, on’-tǐm-pi-wa, on’-tǐm-pi-a-wa, on’-tǐm-pai-wa
- Salicornia rubra – red swampfire
- Salicornia utahensis – Utah swampfire
- Suaeda nigra (formerly Suaeda moquinii) – Mojave sea-blite, bush seepweed

=== Amaryllidaceae ===
- Allium atrorubens – dark red onion
- Allium brandegeei – Brandegee's onion
- Allium brevistylum – shortstyle onion
- Allium lemmonii – Lemmon's onion
- Allium nevadense – Nevada onion
- Allium parvum – small onion
- Allium passeyi – Passey's onion
- Allium textile – prairie onion, textile onion

=== Anacardiaceae ===
- Rhus typhina – staghorn sumac

=== Apiaceae ===
- Angelica wheeleri – Utah angelica
- Conium maculatum†‡ – hemlock, poison hemlock
- Cymopterus basalticus – Intermountain wavewing
- Cymopterus beckii – featherleaf springparsley, Beck springparsley, pinnate springparsley
- Cymopterus evertii – Evert's springparsley, Evert's waferparsnip
- Cymopterus globosus – globe springparsley
- Lomatium ambiguum – Wyeth biscuitroot
- Lomatium grayi – Gray's biscuitroot, Gray's lomatium, milfoil lomatium
- Lomatium latilobum – Canyonlands lomatium, Canyonlands biscuitroot
- Lomatium macrocarpum – bigseed lomatium, biscuit root, bigseed biscuitroot
- Lomatium nevadense – Nevada biscuitroot
- Lomatium nudicaule – pestle lomatium, barestem biscuitroot, Indian celery, Indian consumption plant
- Lomatium triternatum – nineleaf biscuitroot

=== Apocynaceae ===
- Asclepias fascicularis – narrowleaf milkweed, Mexican whorled milkweed
- Asclepias welshii – Welsh's milkweed
- Cycladenia humilis – Sacramento waxydogbane
- Funastrum utahense – Utah swallow-wort, Utah vine milkweed

=== Asparagaceae ===
- Agave utahensis – Utah agave, Nevada agave, Kaibab agave
- Androstephium breviflorum – pink funnel lily, small flowered androstephium
- Camassia quamash – camas, small camas, common camas, common camash, quamash
- Dipterostemon capitatus – blue dicks, purplehead, brodiaea
- Eremocrinum albomarginatum – Utah solitaire lily, Intermountain false-wheatgrass, desert lily, lonely lily, sand lily
- Yucca angustissima – narrowleaf yucca
- Yucca elata – soaptree, soaptree yucca, soapweed, palmella
- Yucca sterilis
- Yucca utahensis

=== Asteraceae ===
- Acamptopappus sphaerocephalus – rayless goldenhead
- Acourtia wrightii – brownfoot
- Agoseris grandiflora – California dandelion, bigflower agoseris, grassland agoseris
- Agoseris retrorsa – spearleaf agoseris, spearleaf mountain dandelion
- Ambrosia acanthicarpa† – flatspine bur ragweed, Hooker's bur-ragweed, annual burrweed, annual bur-sage, western sand-bur
- Ambrosia artemisiifolia† – common ragweed, annual ragweed, low ragweed, American wormwood, bitterweed, blackweed, carrot weed, hay fever weed, Roman wormwood, short ragweed, stammerwort, stickweed, tassel weed
- Ambrosia confertiflora – weakleaf bur ragweed
- Ambrosia dumosa – burro-weed, white bursage
- Ambrosia eriocentra – woolly bursage, woollyfruit burr ragweed
- Ambrosia psilostachya – Cuman ragweed and perennial ragweed, western ragweed
- Ambrosia salsola (or Hymenoclea salsola) – cheesebush, winged ragweed, burrobush, white burrobrush, desert pearl
- Ambrosia sandersonii (or Hymenoclea sandersonii) – Sanderson's burrobrush
- Ambrosia tomentosa – skeletonleaf bur ragweed, silverleaf povertyweed, skeleton-leaf bursage
- Ambrosia trifida – giant ragweed, great ragweed, Texan great ragweed, giant ragweed, tall ragweed, blood ragweed, perennial ragweed, horseweed, buffaloweed, kinghead
- Amphipappus fremontii – chaffbush, eytelia
- Arnica gracilis – Smallhead arnica
- Arnica rydbergii – Rydberg's arnica, subalpine arnica, subalpine leopardbane
- Artemisia arbuscula – little sagebrush, low sagebrush, black sagebrush
- Artemisia bigelovii – Bigelow sagebrush, flat sagebrush
- Artemisia cana – silver sagebrush, sticky sagebrush, silver wormwood, hoary sagebrush, dwarf sagebrush
- Artemisia michauxiana – Michaux's wormwood, lemon sagewort
- Artemisia nova – black sagebrush
- Artemisia pygmaea – pygmy sagebrush
- Artemisia spinescens – budsage, bud sagebrush
- Artemisia tridentata – big sagebrush, Great Basin sagebrush, sagebrush
- Baccharis salicifolia – mule fat, seepwillow, water-wally
- Baileya multiradiata – desert marigold
- Brickellia microphylla – littleleaf brickellbush
- Carduus nutans†‡ – musk thistle, nodding thistle, nodding plumeless thistle
- Centaurea calcitrapa†‡ – red star-thistle, purple starthistle
- Centaurea diffusa†‡ – diffuse knapweed, white knapweed, tumble knapweed
- Centaurea solstitialis†‡ – yellow star-thistle, golden starthistle, yellow cockspur, St. Barnaby's thistle, Barnaby thistle
- Centaurea stoebe†‡ – spotted knapweed, panicled knapweed
- Centaurea virgata†‡ – squarrose knapweed
- Chaenactis stevioides – Esteve's pincushion, desert pincushion
- Chaetopappa ericoides – rose heath, heath-leaved chaetopappa
- Chondrilla juncea†‡ – rush skeletonweed, gum succory, devil's grass, nakedweed
- Chrysothamnus depressus – long-flowered rabbitbrush
- Chrysothamnus greenei – Greene's rabbitbrush
- Chrysothamnus scopulorum – Grand Canyon glowweed, evening-daisy
- Chrysothamnus stylosus – pillar false gumweed, resinbush
- Chrysothamnus viscidiflorus – yellow rabbitbrush, green rabbitbrush
- Cirsium arvense†‡ – creeping thistle, Canada thistle, field thistle
- Cirsium barnebyi – Barneby's thistle
- Cirsium eatonii – Eaton's thistle, mountaintop thistle
- Cirsium rydbergii – alcove thistle, Rydberg's thistle
- Crepis modocensis – Modoc hawksbeard
- Encelia nutans – noddinghead, nodding sunray
- Encelia resinifera – sticky brittlebush, button brittlebush
- Enceliopsis argophylla – silverleaf sunray, nakedstem sunray, naked-stemmed daisy
- Ericameria crispa – crisped goldenbush
- Ericameria lignumviridis – Greenwood's goldenbush, heath-goldenrod
- Ericameria obovata – Rydberg's goldenbush
- Ericameria watsonii – Watson's goldenbush
- Ericameria zionis – subalpine goldenbush, cedar breaks goldenbush
- Erigeron arenarioides – sand fleabane, Wasatch fleabane
- Erigeron canaani – Abajo fleabane
- Erigeron clokeyi – Clokey's fleabane, Clokey's daisy
- Erigeron cronquistii – Cronquist's fleabane
- Erigeron garrettii – Garrett's fleabane
- Erigeron goodrichii – Uinta Mountain fleabane
- Erigeron kachinensis – Kachina fleabane, Kachina daisy
- Erigeron maguirei – Maguire daisy, Maguire's fleabane
- Erigeron mancus – depauperate fleabane, imperfect fleabane
- Erigeron melanocephalus – black-headed fleabane
- Erigeron religiosus – Clear Creek fleabane
- Erigeron sionis – Zion fleabane
- Erigeron untermannii – Indian Canyon fleabane
- Eriophyllum lanatum – common woolly sunflower, Oregon sunshine
- Eurybia kingii – King's serpentweed, King's aster
- Eurybia wasatchensis – Wasatch aster
- Gaillardia arizonica – Arizonia blanketflower
- Gaillardia parryi – Parry's blanketflower
- Gutierrezia petradoria – San Pedro snakeweed, goldenrod snakeweed
- Gutierrezia sarothrae (or Gutierrezia pomariensis) – broom snakeweed, broomweed, snakeweed, matchweed
- Helianthus paradoxus – paradox sunflower, puzzle sunflower, Pecos sunflower
- Heliomeris soliceps – tropical false goldeneye, paria sunflower
- Heterotheca jonesii – Jones's goldenaster
- Hymenoxys biennis
- Hymenoxys bigelovii – Bigelow's rubberweed
- Hymenoxys subintegra – Arizona rubberweed
- Isocoma humilis – Zion goldenbush, Zion jimmyweed
- Isocoma rusbyi – Rusby's goldenbush
- Layia platyglossa – coastal tidytips
- Lepidospartum latisquamum – Nevada broomsage
- Leucanthemum vulgare†‡ – ox-eye daisy, oxeye daisy, dog daisy, field daisy, Marguerite, moon daisy, moon-penny, poor-land penny, poverty daisy, white daisy
- Lorandersonia baileyi – Bailey's rabbitbrush
- Lorandersonia linifolia – rabbitbush
- Lygodesmia doloresensis – Dolores River skeletonplant
- Lygodesmia grandiflora – largeflower skeletonplant, showy rushpink
- Madia gracilis – grassy tarweed, slender tarweed, gumweed madia
- Onopordum acanthium†‡ – cotton thistle, Scotch thistle, Scottish thistle
- Packera castoreus – Beaver Mountain groundsel, Beaver Mountain ragwort
- Packera malmstenii – Podunk ragwort
- Packera musiniensis – Musinea ragwort, Musinea groundsel
- Peucephyllum schottii – pygmy cedar, Schott's pygmy cedar, desert fir, desert pine
- Pyrrocoma apargioides – alpineflames
- Pyrrocoma clementis – tranquil goldenweed
- Rafinesquia neomexicana – desert chicory, plumeseed, New Mexico plumeseed
- Rhaponticum repens (or Acroptilon repens)†‡ – Russian knapweed
- Scorzonera laciniata†‡ – mediterranean serpent-root
- Senecio bigelovii – nodding groundsel, nodding ragwort
- Senecio fremontii – dwarf mountain ragwort
- Stenotus armerioides – thrift mock goldenweed
- Stylocline intertexta – Morefield's neststraw, Mojave neststraw
- Stylocline psilocarphoides – baretwig neststraw, Peck's neststraw
- Thelesperma pubescens – hairy greenthread, Uinta greenthread
- Townsendia aprica – Last Chance Townsend daisy
- Wyethia arizonica – Arizona mule's ears
- Xanthisma paradoxum
- Xylorhiza confertifolia – Henrieville woody-aster
- Xylorhiza cronquistii – Cronquist's woody-aster

=== Boraginaceae ===
- Amsinckia tessellata – bristly fiddleneck, tessellate fiddleneck, checker fiddleneck, devil's lettuce
- Cryptantha virginensis – Virgin River cryptantha
- Cynoglossum officinale†‡ – houndstongue, houndstooth, dog's tongue, gypsy flower, rats and mice
- Echium vulgare†‡ – viper's bugloss, blueweed
- Eriodictyon angustifolium – narrowleaf yerba santa
- Hackelia micrantha – Jessica sticktight, Jessica's stickseed
- Mertensia ciliata – tall fringed bluebells, mountain bluebells, streamside bluebells
- Mertensia lanceolata – prairie bluebells, narrow-leaved languid lady, lance-leaved bluebells, lance-leaved lungwort
- Nemophila parviflora – smallflower nemophila, small-flowered nemophila, oak-leaved nemophila
- Phacelia anelsonii – Aven Nelson's phacelia
- Phacelia argillacea – clay phacelia, Atwood's phacelia
- Phacelia austromontana – Southern Sierra phacelia
- Phacelia curvipes – Washoe phacelia, Washoe scorpionweed
- Phacelia mammillarensis – Nipple Beach phacelia
- Tiquilia canescens – woody crinklemat, shrubby tiquilia
- Phacelia argillacea – clay phacelia and Atwood's phacelia

=== Brassicaceae ===
- Alliaria petiolata†‡ – jack-by-the-hedge, garlic mustard, garlic root, hedge garlic, sauce-alone, jack-in-the-bush, penny hedge, poor man's mustard
- Boechera falcatoria – Grouse Creek rockcress
- Boechera pulchra (or Arabis pulchra) – beautiful rockcress
- Brassica elongata†‡ – elongated mustard, long-stalked rape
- Brassica tournefortii†‡ – Asian mustard, pale cabbage, African mustard, Sahara mustard
- Caulanthus cooperi – Cooper's wild cabbage
- Caulanthus crassicaulis – thickstem wild cabbage
- Caulanthus major – slender wild cabbage
- Caulanthus pilosus – hairy wild cabbage, chocolate drops
- Descurainia paradisa
- Draba burkei – snowbasin draba, Burke's draba
- Draba ramulosa – Mt. Belknap draba, Tushar Mountain draba
- Glaucocarpum suffrutescens (also Hesperidanthus suffrutescens and Schoenocrambe suffrutescens) – Uinta Basin waxfruit, waxfruit mustard, toad-flax cress, shrubby reed-mustard
- Hesperidanthus argillaceus – clay reed-mustard, Uinta Basin plainsmustard, clay thelypody
- Hesperidanthus barnebyi – Barneby reed-mustard, Syes Butte plainsmustard, Barneby thelypody
- Hesperis matronalis†‡ – dame's rocket, damask-violet, dame's-violet, dames-wort, dame's gilliflower, night-scented gilliflower, queen's gilliflower, rogue's gilliflower, summer lilac, sweet rocket, mother-of-the-evening, winter gilliflower
- Isatis tinctoria†‡ – woad, dyer's woad, glastum, Asp of Jerusalem
- Lepidium barnebyanum – Barneby's pepperweed, Barneby's pepper-grass, Barneby's ridge-cress
- Lepidium dictyotum – alkali pepperweed, alkali pepperwort
- Lepidium draba (or Cardaria draba)†‡ – whitetop, hoary cress, Thanet cress
- Lepidium fremontii – desert pepperweed
- Lepidium latifolium†‡ – perennial pepperweed, broadleaved pepperweed, pepperwort, or peppergrass, dittander, dittany, tall whitetop
- Lepidium montanum – mountain pepperweed, mountain peppergrass, mountain pepperwort, mountain pepperplant
- Lepidium nanum – dwarf pepperweed
- Lepidium ostleri – Ostler peppergrass
- Physaria chambersii – Chambers' twinpod
- Physaria fendleri – Fendler's bladderpod, popweed, lesquerella
- Physaria hemiphysaria – Intermountain bladderpod, skyline bladderpod, Tavaputs bladderpod, Range Creek bladderpod
- Physaria lepidota – Kane County twinpod
- Physaria navajoensis – Navajo twinpod, Navajo bladderpod
- Physaria parvula – pygmy bladderpod
- Physaria repanda – Indian Canyon twinpod
- Physaria tumulosa (or Lesquerella tumulosa) – Kodachrome bladderpod
- Smelowskia americana – alpine smelowskia, Siberian smelowskia, American false candytuft
- Thelypodium laxiflorum – droopflower thelypody
- Thelypodium milleflorum – manyflower thelypody, many-flowered thelypodium

=== Cactaceae ===
- Cylindropuntia acanthocarpa – buckhorn cholla
- Cylindropuntia echinocarpa – silver cholla, golden cholla, Wiggins' cholla
- Cylindropuntia imbricata – cane cholla, walking stick cholla, tree cholla, chainlink cactus
- Echinocereus relictus
- Ferocactus cylindraceus – California barrel cactus, desert barrel cactus, miner's compass
- Mammillaria tetrancistra – common fishhook cactus
- Micropuntia pulchella – sagebrush cholla
- Opuntia aurea
- Opuntia basilaris – beavertail cactus, beavertail pricklypear
- Opuntia engelmannii – cow's tongue cactus, cow tongue prickly pear, desert prickly pear, discus prickly pear, Engelmann's prickly pear, Texas prickly pear, nopal, abrojo, joconostle, vela de coyote
- Opuntia pinkavae – Bulrush Canyon prickly-pear, Pinkava's pricklypear
- Pediocactus despainii – Despain's cactus, San Rafael cactus
- Pediocactus sileri – Siler's pincushion cactus, gypsum cactus, gypsum plains cactus
- Pediocactus winkleri – Winkler's cactus, Winkler's pincushion cactus
- Sclerocactus brevispinus – Pariette cactus
- Sclerocactus sileri – Siler fishhook cactus
- Sclerocactus wetlandicus – Uinta Basin hookless cactus, Pariette cactus
- Sclerocactus wrightiae – Wright's little barrel cactus, Wright's fishhook cactus

=== Cannabaceae ===
- Celtis occidentalis – common hackberry, nettletree, sugarberry, beaverwood, northern hackberry, American hackberry

=== Caprifoliaceae ===
- Symphoricarpos longiflorus – desert snowberry, fragrant snowberry
- Symphoricarpos occidentalis – western snowberry, wolfberry
- Symphoricarpos oreophilus – mountain snowberry
- Symphoricarpos rotundifolius – round-leaved snowberry

=== Caryophyllaceae ===
- Achyronychia cooperi – onyxflower, frost-mat
- Arenaria macradenia – Mojave sandwort, desert sandwort
- Minuartia pusilla – annual sandwort, dwarf stitchwort
- Minuartia stricta – bog stitchwort, Teesdale sandwort, rock sandwort
- Silene verecunda – San Francisco campion

=== Cleomaceae ===
- Wislizenia refracta – jackass-clover, spectacle fruit

=== Convolvulaceae ===
- Calystegia longipes – Paiute false bindweed
- Convolvulus spp.†‡ – bindweed, morning glory, wild morning glory
- Cuscuta salina – salt marsh dodder

=== Cupressaceae ===
- Juniperus communis – common juniper
- Juniperus osteosperma (or Juniperus utahensis) – Utah juniper
- Juniperus scopulorum – Rocky Mountain juniper

=== Cyperaceae ===
- Carex cusickii – Cusick's sedge
- Carex luzulina – woodrush sedge
- Carex multicostata – manyrib sedge
- Carex simulata – analogue sedge
- Carex spectabilis – showy sedge
- Carex specuicola – Navajo sedge
- Carex straminiformis – Shasta sedge
- Fimbristylis thermalis – hot springs fimbry
- Kobresia sibirica – Siberian bog sedge

=== Elaeagnaceae ===
- Elaeagnus angustifolia†‡ – Russian olive, silver berry, oleaster, wild olive
- Shepherdia argentea – silver buffaloberry, bull berry, thorny buffaloberry

=== Ephedraceae ===
- Ephedra aspera – rough jointfir, boundary ephedra, pitamoreal
- Ephedra cutleri – Navajo ephedra, Cutler's jointfir
- Ephedra fasciculata – Arizona ephedra, Arizona jointfir, desert Mormon-tea
- Ephedra nevadensis – Nevada ephedra
- Ephedra torreyana – Torrey's jointfir, Torrey's Mormon tea
- Ephedra viridis – green Mormon tea, green ephedra, Indian tea

=== Ericaceae ===
- Arctostaphylos pungens – pointleaf manzanita
- Chimaphila menziesii – little prince's pine, Little Pipsissewa

=== Euphorbiaceae ===
- Croton californicus – California croton
- Euphorbia albomarginata (formerly Chamaesyce albomarginata) – whitemargin sandmat, rattlesnake weed
- Euphorbia esula†‡ – green spurge, leafy spurge
- Euphorbia myrsinites†‡ – myrtle spurge, blue spurge, broad-leaved glaucous-spurge

=== Fabaceae ===
- Alhagi maurorum†‡ – camelthorn, camelthorn-bush, Caspian manna, Persian mannaplant
- Astragalus ampullarioides – Shivwits milkvetch
- Astragalus anserinus – Goose Creek milkvetch
- Astragalus desereticus – Deseret milkvetch
- Astragalus equisolensis – horseshoe milkvetch
- Astragalus filipes – basalt milkvetch
- Astragalus flavus – yellow milkvetch
- Astragalus holmgreniorum – Holmgren milkvetch, paradox milkvetch
- Astragalus iselyi – Isely's milkvetch
- Astragalus lentiginosus – spotted locoweed, freckled milkvetch
- Astragalus limnocharis
- Astragalus loanus – Glenwood milkvetch
- Astragalus oophorus – egg milkvetch
- Astragalus wetherillii – Wetherill's milkvetch
- Astragalus zionis – Zion milkvetch
- Cercis occidentalis – western redbud, California redbud
- Cytisus scoparius†‡ – common broom, Scotch broom, Scot's broom, English broom, broom
- Dalea candida var. oligophylla – western prairie clover
- Dalea searlsiae – Searls' prairie clover
- Galega officinalis†‡ – galega, goat's-rue, French lilac, Italian fitch, professor-weed
- Lupinus kingii – King's lupine
- Ottleya rigida – shrubby deervetch, desert rock-pea
- Oxytropis campestris – field locoweed
- Psorothamnus fremontii – Frémont's dalea, Frémont's indigo bush
- Psorothamnus polydenius – Nevada dalea, Nevada indigobush
- Thermopsis montana – false lupin, mountain goldenbanner, golden pea, mountain thermopsis, revonpapu
- Trifolium beckwithii – Beckwith's clover
- Trifolium eriocephalum – woollyhead clover, hairy head clover
- Trifolium friscanum – Frisco clover
- Trifolium kingii – King's clover

=== Fagaceae ===
- Quercus gambelii – Gambel oak, scrub oak, oak brush, white oak
- Quercus welshii – wavy leaf oak, shinnery oak, Tucker oak

=== Garryaceae ===
- Garrya flavescens – ashy silktassel

=== Gentianaceae ===
- Frasera albomarginata – desert green gentian, desert frasera
- Frasera gypsicola – Sunnyside green-gentian, Sunnyside elkweed, Sunnyside frasera
- Gentiana parryi – Parry's gentian

=== Geraniaceae ===
- Geranium caespitosum – purple cluster geranium, pineywoods geranium

=== Hypericaceae ===
- Hypericum perforatum†‡ – perforate St John's-wort, common Saint John's wort, St John's wort, Tipton's weed, rosin rose, goatweed, chase-devil, Klamath weed

=== Lamiaceae ===
- Agastache urticifolia – nettleleaf giant hyssop, horse mint
- Salvia azurea – azure blue sage, azure sage, blue sage, prairie sage
- Salvia columbariae – chia, chia sage, golden chia, desert chia, pashiiy, it'epeš
- Salvia dorrii – purple sage, Dorr's sage, fleshy sage, mint sage, tobacco sage

=== Liliaceae ===
- Calochortus ambiguus – Arizona mariposa lily, doubting mariposa lily
- Calochortus bruneaunis – Bruneau mariposa lily
- Calochortus ciscoensis
- Calochortus flexuosus – winding Mariposa lily, straggling Mariposa lily

=== Loasaceae ===
- Eucnide urens – desert rock nettle, desert stingbush, velcro plant, vegetable velcro
- Mentzelia goodrichii – Goodrich's blazingstar
- Mentzelia laevicaulis – giant blazingstar, smoothstem blazingstar

=== Lythraceae ===
- Lythrum salicaria†‡ – purple loosestrife, spiked loosestrife, purple lythrum

=== Malvaceae ===
- Sidalcea oregana – Oregon checkerbloom
- Sphaeralcea ambigua – desert globemallow, apricot mallow
- Sphaeralcea gierischii – Gierisch's globemallow, Gierisch mallow
- Sphaeralcea rusbyi – Rusby's globemallow, Rusby's desert-mallow

=== Montiaceae ===
- Cistanthe umbellata – Mount Hood pussypaws, pussy-paws

=== Nyctaginaceae ===
- Abronia mellifera – white sand verbena
- Mirabilis laevis – desert wishbone-bush

=== Oleaceae ===
- Fraxinus anomala – single-leaf ash
- Menodora spinescens – spiny menodora

=== Onagraceae ===
- Camissonia bairdii
- Oenothera albicaulis – prairie evening-primrose, white-stem evening-primrose, whitish evening primrose, whitest evening primrose
- Oenothera avita – California evening primrose
- Oenothera lavandulifolia – lavender leaf sundrops
- Oenothera primiveris – yellow desert evening primrose, bottle evening-primrose, desert evening-primrose

=== Orchidaceae ===
- Cypripedium fasciculatum – clustered lady's slipper
- Spiranthes diluvialis – Ute lady's tresses, Ute ladies'-tresses

=== Orobanchaceae ===
- Castilleja angustifolia – northwestern Indian paintbrush, desert Indian paintbrush
- Castilleja applegatei – Applegate's Indian paintbrush, wavyleaf Indian paintbrush
- Castilleja aquariensis – Aquarius Plateau Indian paintbrush
- Castilleja linariifolia – Wyoming Indian paintbrush, narrow-leaved Indian paintbrush, desert paintbrush, Wyoming desert paintbrush, Wyoming paintbrush, linaria-leaved Indian Paintbrush, Indian paintbrush
- Castilleja occidentalis – western Indian paintbrush
- Castilleja septentrionalis – pale painted cup, northern painted cup, pale Indian paintbrush, Labrador Indian paintbrush
- Pedicularis centranthera – dwarf lousewort, Great Basin lousewort

=== Paeoniaceae ===
- Paeonia brownii – Brown's peony, native peony, western peony

=== Papaveraceae ===
- Arctomecon californica – California bearpoppy, Las Vegas bearpoppy, golden bearpoppy, yellow-flowered desert poppy
- Arctomecon humilis – bearclaw poppy, dwarf bearclaw-poppy
- Dicentra uniflora – longhorn steer's head
- Eschscholzia minutiflora – pygmy poppy
- Platystemon californicus – creamcups

=== Phrymaceae ===
- Erythranthe suksdorfii – Suksdorf's monkeyflower, miniature monkeyflower
- Mimetanthe pilosa – false monkeyflower, downy mimetanthe

=== Pinaceae ===
- Abies concolor – white fir
- Abies lasiocarpa – subalpine fir, Rocky Mountain fir, Rocky Mountain subalpine fir
- Picea engelmannii – Engelmann spruce, white spruce, mountain spruce, silver spruce
- Pinus edulis – Colorado pinyon, two-needle piñon, pinyon pine, piñon
- Pinus flexilis – limber pine, Rocky Mountain white pine
- Pinus longaeva – Great Basin bristlecone pine, intermountain bristlecone pine, western bristlecone pine
- Pinus monophylla – single-leaf pinyon, single-leaf piñon
- Pinus ponderosa – ponderosa pine, bull pine, blackjack pine, western yellow-pine, or filipinus pine
- Pseudotsuga menziesii var. glauca – Rocky Mountain Douglas-fir

=== Plantaginaceae ===
- Linaria dalmatica†‡ – Balkan toadflax, broadleaf toadflax, Dalmatian toadflax
- Linaria vulgaris†‡ – common toadflax, yellow toadflax, butter-and-eggs
- Mohavea breviflora – golden desert-snapdragon, lesser mohavea
- Penstemon cyanocaulis – bluestem penstemon, bluestem beardtongue
- Penstemon franklinii – Franklin's penstemon
- Penstemon gibbensii – Gibbens' beardtongue
- Penstemon grahamii – Uinta Basin beardtongue, Graham's beardtongue
- Penstemon navajoa – Navajo Mountain beardtongue, Navajo beardtongue
- Penstemon palmeri – Palmer's penstemon
- Penstemon pinorum – Pine Valley penstemon, pinyon penstemon
- Penstemon scariosus – White River beardtongue, White River beardtongue, Neese's Blue Mountain beardtongue, Garrett's beardtongue

=== Poaceae ===
- Aegilops cylindrica†‡ – jointed goatgrass
- Aristida purpurea – purple three-awn
- Arundo donax†‡ – giant cane, elephant grass, carrizo, arundo, Spanish cane, Colorado river reed, wild cane, giant reed
- Blepharidachne kingii – King's eyelashgrass
- Bouteloua eriopoda – black grama
- Bouteloua gracilis – blue grama
- Bromus tectorum† – drooping brome, cheatgrass
- Calamagrostis rubescens – pinegrass
- Cynodon dactylon†‡ (Note: Except in Washington County.) – Bermuda grass, Dhoob, dūrvā grass, ethana grass, dubo, dog's tooth grass, Bahama grass, devil's grass, couch grass, Indian doab, arugampul, grama, wiregrass, scutch grass, crab grass
- Distichlis spicata – seashore saltgrass, inland saltgrass, desert saltgrass
- Elymus elymoides – squirreltail
- Elymus repens†‡ – couch grass, common couch, twitch, quick grass, quitch grass, quitch, dog grass, quackgrass, scutch grass, witchgrass
- Eriocoma arida – Mormon needlegrass
- Eriocoma lemmonii – Lemmon's needlegrass
- Eriocoma lettermanii – Letterman's needlegrass
- Eriocoma nelsonii – Columbia needlegrass, subalpine needlegrass, western needlegrass
- Eriocoma parishii (also Stipa parishii) – Parish's needlegrass
- Eriocoma thurberiana – Thurber's needlegrass
- Hilaria rigida – big galleta
- Imperata cylindrica†‡ – cogongrass, kunai grass, blady grass, satintail, spear grass, sword grass, thatch grass, alang-alang, lalang grass, cotton wool grass, kura-kura
- Melica stricta – rock melic
- Oryzopsis hymenoides (or Achnatherum hymenoides or Stipa hymenoides) – Indian ricegrass, sand rice grass
- Phragmites australis†‡ – common reed
- Pseudoroegneria spicata – bluebunch wheatgrass
- Puccinellia simplex – California alkaligrass, western alkali grass
- Sorghum almum†‡
- Sorghum halepense†‡ – Johnson grass, Johnsongrass
- Sporobolus wrightii – big sacaton, giant sacaton

=== Polemoniaceae ===
- Aliciella caespitosa (or Gilia caespitosa) – Rabbit Valley gilia, Wonderland Alice-flower
- Aliciella leptomeria – sand gilia, Great Basin gilia
- Aliciella tenuis – Mussentuchit gilia, Mussentuchit Creek gilia
- Gilia ophthalmoides – eyed gilia
- Gilia transmontana – transmontane gilia
- Leptosiphon harknessii – Harkness' flaxflower
- Loeseliastrum depressum – depressed ipomopsis
- Polemonium viscosum – sky pilot, skunkweed, sticky Jacobs-ladder, sticky polemonium

=== Polygonaceae ===
- Eriogonum alatum – winged buckwheat, winged eriogonum
- Eriogonum corymbosum var. smithii – Flat Tops wild buckwheat
- Eriogonum corymbosum var. nilesii – Nile's wild buckwheat, Las Vegas buckwheat, golden buckwheat
- Eriogonum heermannii – Heermann's buckwheat
- Eriogonum jamesii – James' buckwheat, antelope sage
- Eriogonum nidularium – birdnest buckwheat
- Eriogonum nummulare – Kearney's buckwheat, money buckwheat
- Eriogonum soredium – Frisco buckwheat
- Eriogonum thomasii – Thomas' buckwheat
- Eriogonum zionis – Zion wild buckwheat, Point Sublime wild buckwheat
- Polygonum utahense – Utah knotweed
- Pterostegia drymarioides – woodland threadstem, woodland pterostegia, fairy mist, fairy bowties
- Reynoutria japonica (or Polygonum cuspidatum or Fallopia japonica)†‡ – Asian knotweed, Japanese knotweed

=== Primulaceae ===
- Androsace filiformis – filiform rockjasmine, slender-stemmed androsace
- Dodecatheon alpinum – alpine shooting star
- Dodecatheon dentatum – white shooting star, toothed American cowslip
- Dodecatheon redolens (also Primula fragrans) – scented shooting star
- Primula cusickiana (or Primula maguirei) – Cusick's primrose, Maquire primrose

=== Pteridaceae ===
- Argyrochosma jonesii – Jones' false cloak fern
- Myriopteris covillei (formerly Cheilanthes covillei) – Coville's lip fern
- Myriopteris parryi (formerly Cheilanthes parryi) – Parry's lip fern

=== Ranunculaceae ===
- Aquilegia flavescens – yellow columbine
- Aquilegia formosa – crimson columbine, western columbine, red columbine
- Aquilegia grahamii – Graham's columbine
- Delphinium parishii – desert larkspur
- Ranunculus aestivalis – fall buttercup, autumn buttercup
- Thalictrum occidentale – western meadow-rue

=== Rhamnaceae ===
- Ceanothus fendleri – Fendler's ceanothus, Fendler's buckbrush, deer brier
- Ceanothus velutinus – snowbrush ceanothus, red root, tobacco brush
- Rhamnus alnifolia – alderleaf buckthorn, alder buckthorn

=== Rosaceae ===
- Amelanchier utahensis – Utah serviceberry
- Cercocarpus ledifolius var. intricatus – little-leaf mountain mahogany, narrowleaf mahogany, dwarf mountain mahogany
- Coleogyne ramosissima – blackbrush
- Crataegus chrysocarpa – fireberry hawthorn, goldenberry hawthorn
- Crataegus saligna – willow hawthorn
- Ivesia kingii (or Potentilla kingii) – King's mousetail
- Peraphyllum ramosissimum – squaw apple, wild crab apple
- Physocarpus malvaceus – mallow ninebark
- Potentilla angelliae – Angell cinquefoil, Boulder Mountain cinquefoil
- Potentilla cottamii – Cottam's cinquefoil, Pilot Range cinquefoil
- Prunus virginiana – bitter-berry, chokecherry, Virginia bird cherry, western chokecherry, black chokecherry
- Purshia glandulosa – antelope bitterbrush, desert bitterbrush, Mojave antelope brush
- Purshia stansburyana (or Purshia stansburiana) – Stansbury's cliffrose
- Purshia tridentata – bitterbrush, antelope bush, buckbrush, quinine brush, deerbrush, blackbrush, greasewood
- Rosa woodsii – Woods' rose, interior rose

=== Rubiaceae ===
- Galium bifolium – twinleaf bedstraw, low mountain bedstraw
- Galium coloradoense – Colorado bedstraw
- Galium desereticum
- Galium emeryense – Emery County bedstraw
- Galium hypotrichium – alpine bedstraw
- Galium magnifolium – largeleaf bedstraw
- Galium mexicanum – Mexican bedstraw
- Galium multiflorum – Kellogg's bedstraw, shrubby bedstraw, many-flowered bedstraw
- Galium munzii – Munz's bedstraw
- Galium proliferum – limestone bedstraw
- Galium stellatum – starry bedstraw, desert bedstraw
- Houstonia rubra – red bluet

=== Salicaceae ===
- Populus angustifolia – narrowleaf cottonwood
- Populus tremuloides – quaking aspen, trembling aspen, American aspen, mountain aspen, golden aspen, trembling poplar, white poplar, popple
- Salix amygdaloides – peachleaf willow
- Salix arizonica – Arizona willow
- Salix bebbiana – beaked willow, long-beaked willow, gray willow, Bebb's willow, red willow
- Salix boothii – Booth's willow
- Salix brachycarpa – barren-ground willow, small-fruit willow, shortfruit willow
- Salix cascadensis
- Salix cinerea† – common sallow, gray sallow, gray willow, grey sallow, grey willow, grey-leaved sallow, large gray willow, pussy willow, rusty sallow
- Salix drummondiana – Drummond's willow
- Salix exigua – sandbar willow, narrowleaf willow, coyote willow
- Salix fragilis† – crack willow, brittle willow
- Salix geyeriana – Geyer's willow, Geyer willow, silver willow
- Salix glauca – gray willow, grayleaf willow, white willow, glaucous willow
- Salix gooddingii – Goodding's willow, Goodding's black willow
- Salix laevigata – red willow, polished willow
- Salix lasiolepis – arroyo willow
- Salix ligulifolia – strapleaf willow
- Salix lucida – shining willow, Pacific willow, whiplash willow
- Salix lutea – yellow willow
- Salix matsudana† – Chinese willow
- Salix melanopsis – dusky willow
- Salix monticola – mountain willow, cherry willow, serviceberry willow, park willow
- Salix nivalis – net-leaved willow, snow willow
- Salix petrophila – alpine willow, Rocky Mountain willow
- Salix planifolia – planeleaf willow, diamondleaf willow, tea-leafed willow
- Salix prolixa – MacKenzie's willow
- Salix scouleriana – Scouler's willow
- Salix wolfii

=== Santalaceae ===
- Phoradendron californicum – desert mistletoe, mesquite mistletoe
- Phoradendron juniperinum – juniper mistletoe

=== Sarcobataceae ===
- Sarcobatus vermiculatus – greasewood, seepwood, saltbush

=== Saururaceae ===
- Anemopsis californica – yerba mansa, lizard tail

=== Simmondsiaceae ===
- Simmondsia chinensis – Jojoba, goat nut, deer nut, pignut, wild hazel, quinine nut, coffeeberry, gray box bush

=== Solanaceae ===
- Hyoscyamus niger†‡ – henbane, black henbane, stinking nightshade
- Lycium andersonii – water-jacket, redberry desert-thorn, Anderson thornbush, Anderson's desert thorn, Anderson boxthorn, Anderson lycium, Anderson wolfberry, squawberry
- Lycium barbarum† – Chinese wolfberry, Chinese boxthorn, Himalayan goji, Tibetan goji, mede berry, barbary matrimony vine, red medlar, matrimony vine, Duke of Argyll's tea tree, Duke of Argyll's tea plant, Murali
- Lycium cooperi – peach thorn
- Lycium pallidum – pale wolfberry, pale desert-thorn
- Lycium torreyi – Torrey wolfberry

=== Tamaricaceae ===
- Tamarix ramosissima†‡ – saltcedar, salt cedar, tamarisk

=== Violaceae ===
- Viola frank-smithii – Frank Smith's violet
- Viola praemorsa – canary violet, Astoria violet, yellow montane violet

=== Vitaceae ===
- Vitis arizonica – Arizona grape

=== Zygophyllaceae ===
- Fagonia laevis – California fagonbush
- Larrea tridentata – creosote bush, greasewood, chaparral, gobernadora, hediondilla
- Tribulus terrestris†‡ – goat's-head, bindii, bullhead, burra gokharu, bhakhdi, caltrop, small caltrops, cat's-head, devil's eyelashes, devil's-thorn, devil's-weed, puncture vine, tackweed

== Individual trees ==
These are named specific trees that are each special for different reasons.

- Jardine Juniper – A Rocky Mountain juniper found within Logan Canyon in the Cache National Forest that is about 1,500 years old.
- Pando – A clonal colony of an individual male quaking aspen determined to be a single living organism by identical genetic markers and assumed to have one massive underground root system. The plant is located in the Fremont River Ranger District of the Fishlake National Forest at the western edge of the Colorado Plateau in south-central Utah, United States, around 1 mile (1.6 km) southwest of Fish Lake. Pando occupies 43 hectares (106 acres) and is estimated to weigh collectively 6,000,000 kilograms (6,600 short tons), making it the heaviest known organism.
- Thousand Mile Tree – A pine tree located in Weber Canyon near the community of Henefer, Utah along the Overland Route of the Union Pacific Railroad. Its location is 1,000 miles (1,600 km) (by rail) from Omaha, Nebraska.

== See also ==
- Flora of the Colorado Plateau and Canyonlands region
- Pinyon–juniper woodland
- Rocky Mountain Floristic Region
- Sagebrush steppe
- Utah Native Plant Society
- Wasatch and Uinta montane forests
- Wyoming Basin shrub steppe
