= Packera castoreus =

Conservation status
- Critically Imperiled (NatureServe)

Scientific classification
- Kingdom: Plantae
- Clade: Tracheophytes
- Clade: Angiosperms
- Clade: Eudicots
- Clade: Asterids
- Order: Asterales
- Family: Asteraceae
- Genus: Packera
- Species: P. castoreus

Binomial name
- Packera castoreus (S.L. Welsh) Kartesz

Synonyms
- Senecio castoreus

Species of tree

Packera castoreus is a rare species of flowering plant in the aster family known by the common names Beaver Mountain groundsel and Beaver Mountain ragwort. It is endemic to Utah in the United States, where it occurs only in the Tushar Mountains.

This small alpine plant grows just a few centimeters tall with one or more woolly stems. The lower leaves have blades one or two centimeters long with woolly undersides. The flower heads have purple-green, woolly phyllaries and no ray florets.

There are about 7 to 10 known occurrences of this plant on the high slopes of the Tushar Mountains of central Utah, mostly within the Fishlake National Forest. It occurs on Mt. Belknap and Gold Mountain, and probably other peaks. It grows on barren talus on windy, exposed mountain slopes in alpine tundra habitat above the tree line. Other plants in the sparsely vegetated habitat include sky pilot (Polemonium viscosum), Mt. Belknap draba (Draba ramulosa), and various grasses.
