= Astragalus flavus =

Conservation status
- Secure (NatureServe)

Scientific classification
- Kingdom: Plantae
- Clade: Tracheophytes
- Clade: Angiosperms
- Clade: Eudicots
- Clade: Rosids
- Order: Fabales
- Family: Fabaceae
- Subfamily: Faboideae
- Genus: Astragalus
- Species: A. flavus

Binomial name
- Astragalus flavus Torr. & A.Gray

Species of legume

Astragalus flavus (yellow milkvetch) is a perennial plant in the legume family (Fabaceae) found in the Colorado Plateau and Canyonlands region of the southwestern United States.

== Growth pattern ==
It is an erect or curving perennial from 2 to 12 inches (5.1 to 30.5 cm) tall. The plant is covered with star-shaped hairs.

Patches of the plants in bloom may cover large areas of the ground in yellow from the flowers.

== Stems and leaves ==
1 to 6 inches (2.5 to 15.2 cm) leaves are compound pinnate, with linear to egg shaped 1/4 to 6 inches (0.64 to 15.24 cm) leaflets.

== Inflorescence and fruit ==
The inflorescence is born on a stalk with 6-30 flowers having a hairy calyx tube and yellow bell-shaped corolla 1/4 to 1/2 inch (0.64 to 1.27 cm) long. "Flavus" means "yellow", even though most of its flowers are white. It blooms from May to June.

== Habitat and range ==
It grows in saline soil (halophyte) in salt desert shrub between about 3,800 to 5,400 feet (1,200 to 1,600 m) in elevation.
