= Astragalus wetherillii =

Conservation status
- Vulnerable (NatureServe)

Scientific classification
- Kingdom: Plantae
- Clade: Tracheophytes
- Clade: Angiosperms
- Clade: Eudicots
- Clade: Rosids
- Order: Fabales
- Family: Fabaceae
- Subfamily: Faboideae
- Genus: Astragalus
- Species: A. wetherillii

Binomial name
- Astragalus wetherillii M.E.Jones

Species of legume

Astragalus wetherillii is a species of flowering plant in the legume family known by the common name Wetherill's milkvetch. It is native to Colorado and Utah in the United States.

This perennial herb grows from a taproot and a caudex which yields several stems. The stems are partly purplish or reddish in color and are finely hairy. The leaves are green, without the silvery hairs of some other Astragalus. Each leaf is up to 10 centimeters long and is made up of up to 15 leaflets. The flowers are white or lavender-tinted and roughly a centimeter long. The fruit is a legume pod with a single chamber inside. It is green and sometimes purple-speckled.

This species is found mainly in Colorado, and there is one occurrence in the canyon of the Colorado River in Utah. This has not been surveyed recently but it probably survives in the canyon. It grows in pinyon-juniper woodland habitat, as well as shrublands and desert scrub. It usually grows in open areas on slopes and in arroyos. It may be locally common.

This species is a short-lived perennial but sometimes it lasts only one year before dying. It reproduces by seed. Flowering occurs in May and June.
