= Eriogonum zionis =

Conservation status
- Apparently Secure (NatureServe)

Scientific classification
- Kingdom: Plantae
- Clade: Tracheophytes
- Clade: Angiosperms
- Clade: Eudicots
- Order: Caryophyllales
- Family: Polygonaceae
- Genus: Eriogonum
- Species: E. zionis

Binomial name
- Eriogonum zionis J.T. Howell

Synonyms
- Eriogonum racemosum var. nobilis S.L.Welsh & N.D.Atwood; Eriogonum racemosum var. zionis (J.T.Howell) S.L.Welsh; Eriogonum racemosum var. coccineum (J.T.Howell) S.L.Welsh

Species of wild buckwheat

Eriogonum zionis, common name Zion wild buckwheat or Point Sublime wild buckwheat, is a plant species native to the southwestern United States, the states of Utah and Arizona. It grows on sandy or gravelly soil at elevations of 1300–2300 m.

Two varieties have been named:

var. zionis, the Zion wild buckwheat, with white to yellow flowers, has been reported from scattered populations in 4 counties in Utah (Kane, San Juan, Washington, and Wayne) and 2 counties in Arizona (Coconino and Mohave).

var. coccineum J. T. Howell, the Point Sublime wild buckwheat, with bright red flowers, is known from only two locations, one on the edge of the Grand Canyon in Coconino County, the other from Hack Canyon in Mohave County.

Eriogonum zionis is an erect to spreading herb up to 10 cm tall. Leaves are up to 6 cm long, densely hairy on both sides. Flowers are white, yellow or red.
