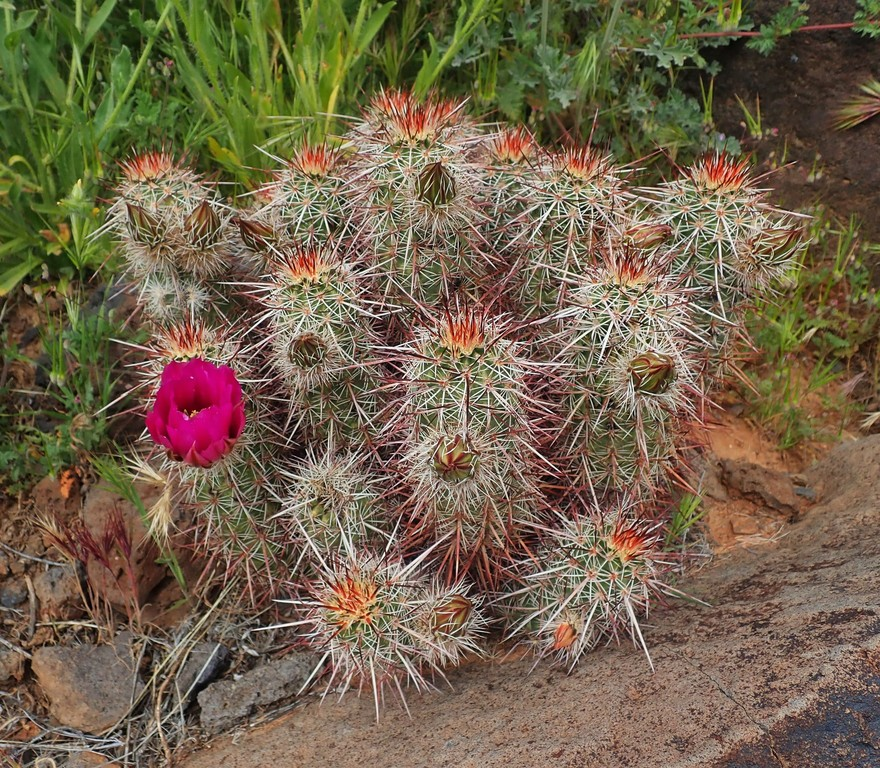

Scientific classification
- Kingdom: Plantae
- Clade: Tracheophytes
- Clade: Angiosperms
- Clade: Eudicots
- Order: Caryophyllales
- Family: Cactaceae
- Subfamily: Cactoideae
- Genus: Echinocereus
- Species: E. relictus

Binomial name
- Echinocereus relictus Wellard

Synonyms
- Echinocereus engelmannii var. purpureus L.D.Benson 1969

= Echinocereus relictus =

Species of cactus

Echinocereus relictus is a species of hedgehog cactus commonly known as “purple-spined hedgehog cactus”.

== Description ==
Echinocereus relictus forms loose groups consisting of 1 to 45 shoots. The green cylindrical to elongated shoots are 3 to 7.6 centimeters long and have a diameter of 2.1 to 6.5 centimeters. The shoot surface is not completely covered by the spines. There are 11 to 14 ribs that are not clearly tuberculated and crested. The 0 to 4 straight or curved, gray to reddish brown central spines have a darker tip and are 0.4 to 1 centimeters long. The 10 to 16 spreading, straight, whitish or grayish radial spines are 0.5 to 1.4 centimeters long. The broadly funnel-shaped flowers are rose to magenta. They appear in the upper half of the shoots, are 5 to 9 centimeters long and reach the 3-9 centimeters diameter. The spherical, fleshy, initially green fruits later turn orange red 2-4 cm with reddish white pulp and black seeds. The chromosome count is 2n=22.

== Distribution ==
Plants are found growing in Mohave County, Arizona and Washington County, Utah, United States at elevations of 700 to 1600 meters growing among rock outcrops and crevices in open hills and valleys in desert shrub and pinion juniper forest.

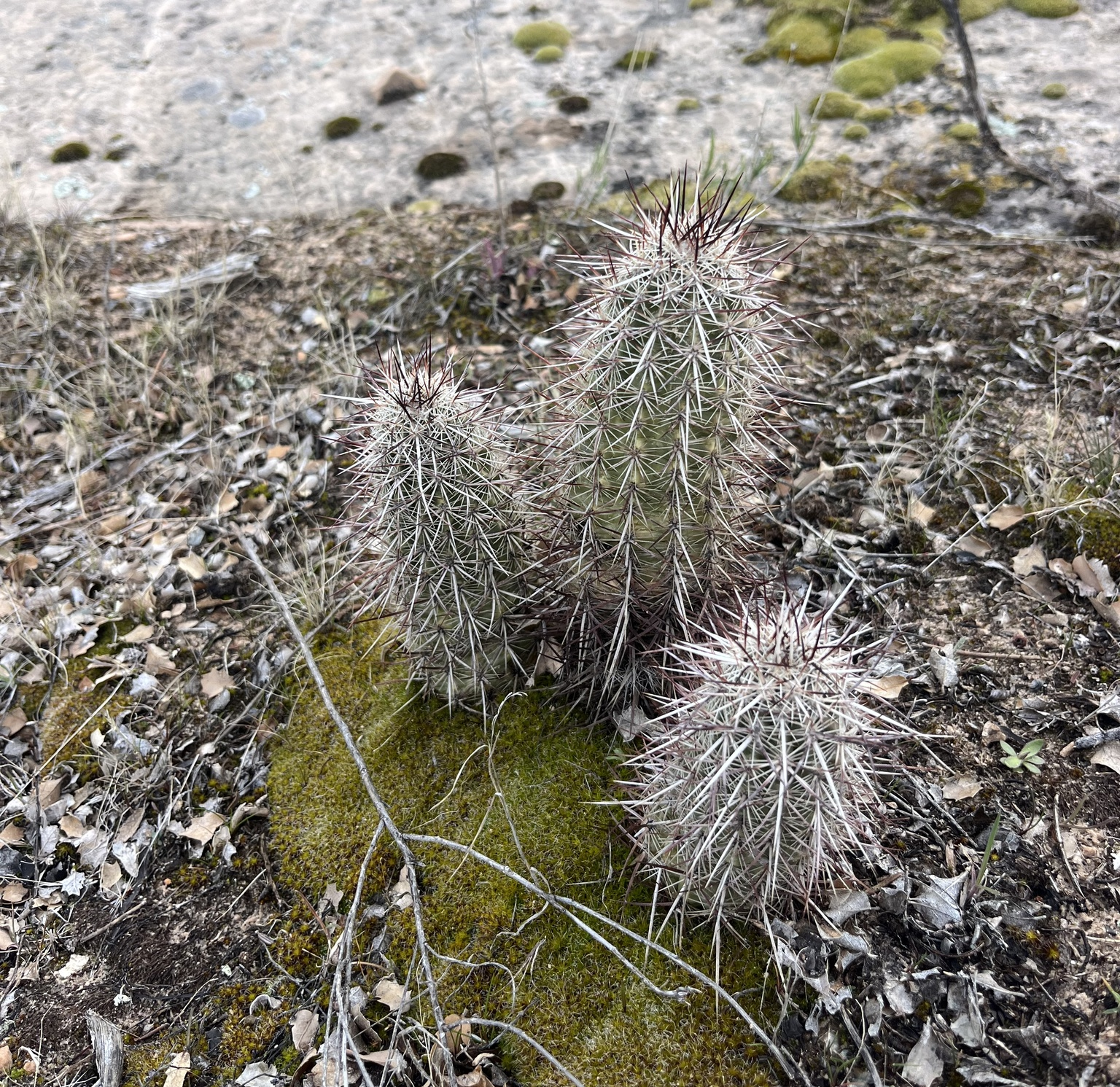
Habitat in Gunlock, Utah

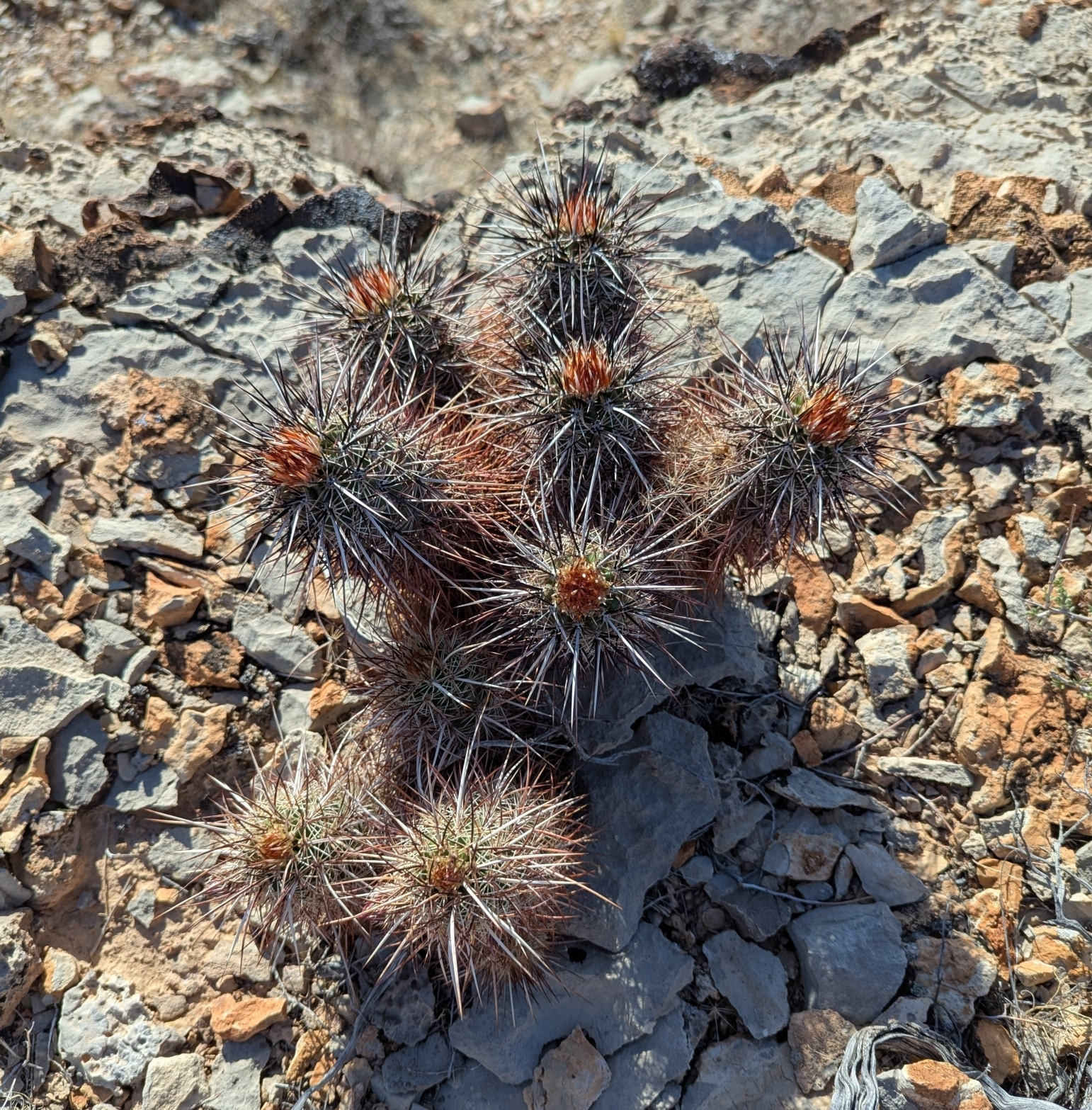
Habitat in Utah southwest of Atkinville

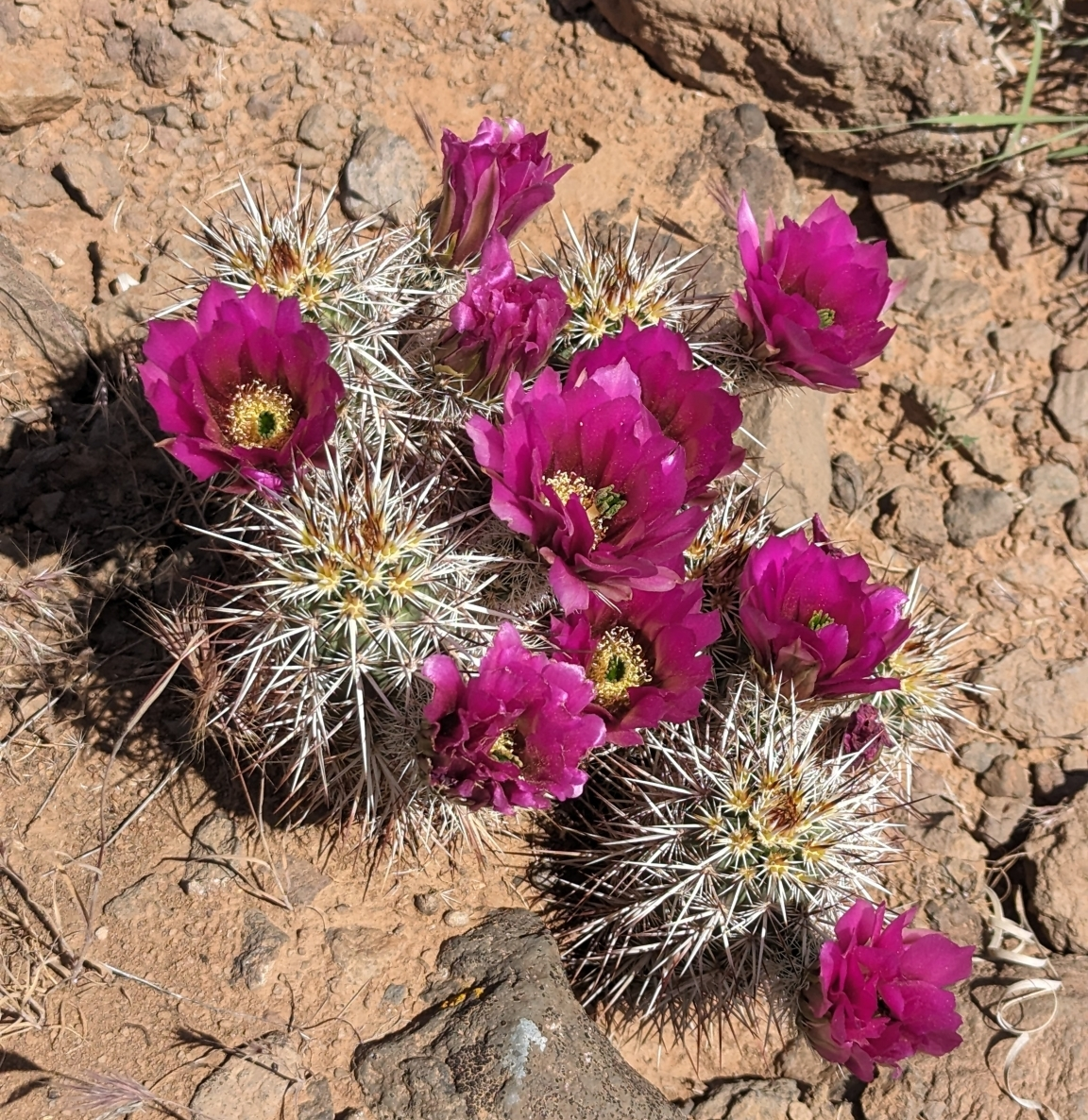
Habitat in St. George, Utah

== Taxonomy ==
The plant was first described in 1969 by L.D.Benson as Echinocereus engelmannii var. purpureus a variety. The plant is distinguished from Echinocereus engelmannii by its different cytology and thinner stems with shorter spines. The specific epithet relictus refers to the species survival in a refugium in northeastern Mojave Desert.
