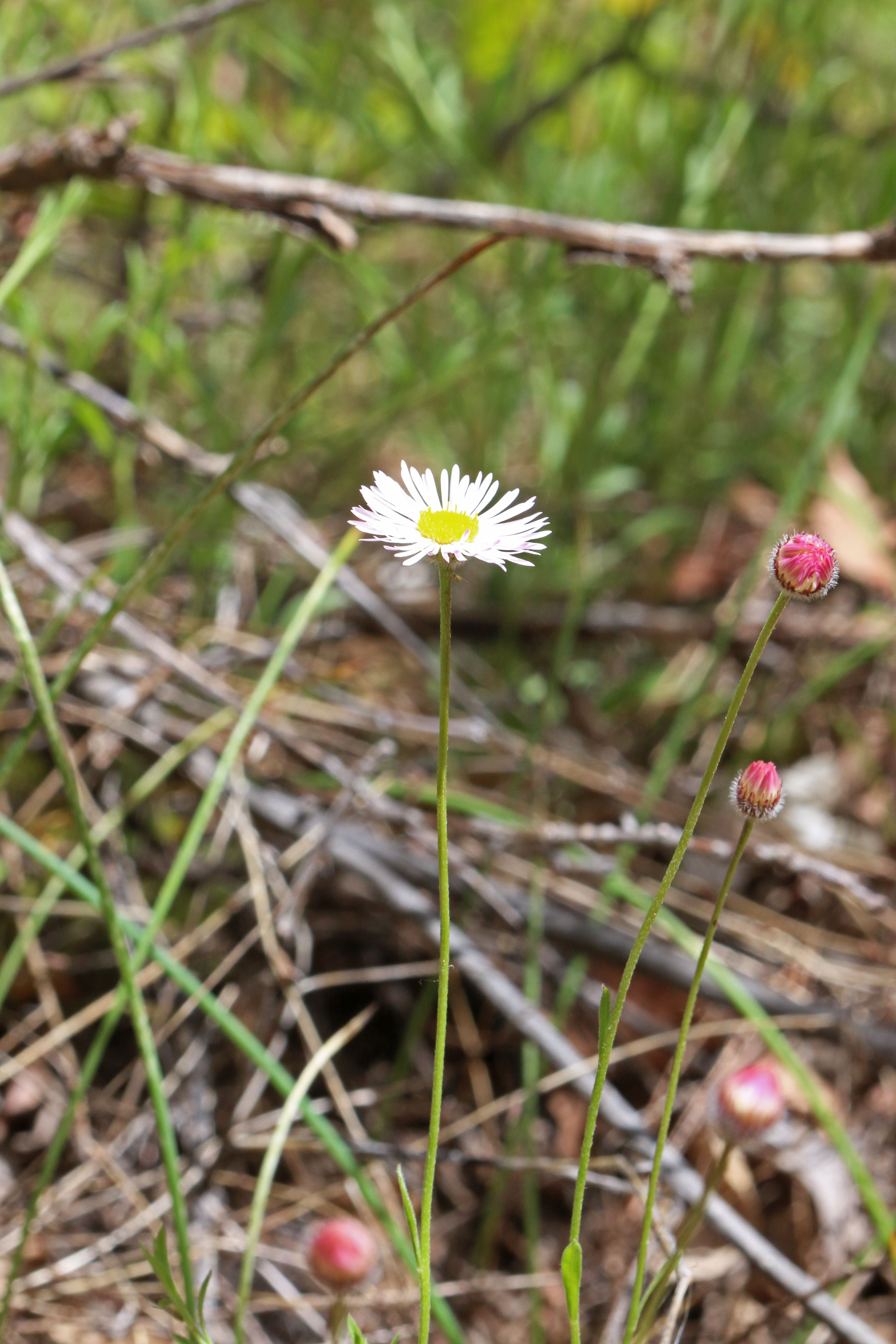

Scientific classification
- Kingdom: Plantae
- Clade: Tracheophytes
- Clade: Angiosperms
- Clade: Eudicots
- Clade: Asterids
- Order: Asterales
- Family: Asteraceae
- Genus: Erigeron
- Species: E. sionis

Binomial name
- Erigeron sionis Cronquist

Synonyms
- Erigeron flagellaris var. trilobatus Maguire ex Cronquist, syn of var. trilobatus; Erigeron proselyticus G.L.Nesom, syn of var. trilobatus

= Erigeron sionis =

Species of flowering plant

Erigeron sionis is a North American species of flowering plant in the family Asteraceae known by the common name Zion fleabane. It has been found in the southwestern United States, only in southern Utah. Some of the populations are inside Zion National Park, after which the species is named.

Erigeron sionis grows in shallow soil in open woodlands dominated by pine, juniper, Douglas fir, maple, and oak. It is a perennial, colony-forming herb up to 25 cm (10 inches) tall, spreading by means of stolons running along the surface of the ground. The inflorescence generally contains 1-4 flower heads. Each head contains 22–46 white ray florets surrounding many yellow disc florets.

Varieties

- Erigeron sionis var. sionis
- Erigeron sionis var. trilobatus (Maguire ex Cronquist) S.L.Welsh
