= Penstemon franklinii =

Conservation status
- Critically Imperiled (NatureServe)

Scientific classification
- Kingdom: Plantae
- Clade: Tracheophytes
- Clade: Angiosperms
- Clade: Eudicots
- Clade: Asterids
- Order: Lamiales
- Family: Plantaginaceae
- Genus: Penstemon
- Species: P. franklinii

Binomial name
- Penstemon franklinii S.L.Welsh

Plant species in the veronica family

Penstemon franklinii, or Franklin penstemon, is a plant species endemic to Utah, United States, known only from Cedar Valley in Iron County. It grows in grasslands and in sagebrush communities.

== Description ==
Penstemon franklinii is a perennial plant that grows between 4 and 25 centimeters (1.6 and 9.8 in) tall. The stems are herbaceous growing from a branched caudex. Plants are quite compact with the two lowest leaf nodes less than a third of the total height. The texture of the stems is retrorsely hairy, covered in backwards facing hairs giving a rough texture, low down on the plant and glandular-pubescent, covered in glandular hairs, on their upper parts.

Plants have both cauline and basal leaves, ones that are attached to the stems and leaves growing directly from the base of the plant, that are not leathery. They can be hairless on both sides or retrorsely hairy, mostly along the midvein on the upper side of leaves towards the top of the plant. The edges are variously all toothed or all smooth with the uppermost leaves more often toothed. The lower leaves are attached by petioles or very narrow bases. They measure 1.2 to 7.3 cm (0.5 to 2.9 in) in length and 2 to 9 millimeters in width.

On the stems plants have three to five pairs of leaves of leaves. Higher up on the stems the leaves have no petioles and the base of the leaf more or less clasps the stem. Their length only reaches 11–48 mm (0.4–1.9 in) with a width of 2–6 mm with a narrow lance-attenuate shape.

The inflorescence has three to five groups of flowers with two bracts immediately under them also lance-attenuate. Each group has two cymes with three to five flowers. The fused flower petals have a funnel shape 14 to 20 millimeters long. The zygomorphic flowers are blue to blue-purple with purple nectar guide lines and a palate, upper part inside the tube, that is covered in yellow, woolly hairs. The staminode reaches or falls short of reaching the flower opening at 7–9 mm in length with sparse to dense golden-yellow hairs covering the tip.

== Taxonomy ==
The botanical description and scientific name of Penstemon franklinii was published by Stanley Larson Welsh in 1993. It is in the Penstemon genus in the Plantaginaceae family. It has no varieties or synonyms.

=== Names ===
The species name, franklinii, was selected by Welsh to honor M.A. "Ben" Franklin, who collected the type specimen with Welsh and for his outstanding field work in botany. In English it is called Franklin penstemon.

== Range and habitat ==
The species is endemic to Iron County, Utah and limited to just Cedar Valley southeast of the Escalante Desert in far southwestern Utah. The total range of the species is less than 100 square kilometers (39 sq mi) and is located at the north end of the valley. It is locally abundant in some places, but in others there are less 50 plants in a locality. It grows with three-awn grass, needle grass, matchweed, and black sagebrush.

=== Conservation ===
The conservation organization NatureServe evaluated Penstemon franklinii in 2019 and rated it as critically imperiled (G1) due to its narrow endemic range with only four or five populations of the plant.

== See also ==
- List of Penstemon species
