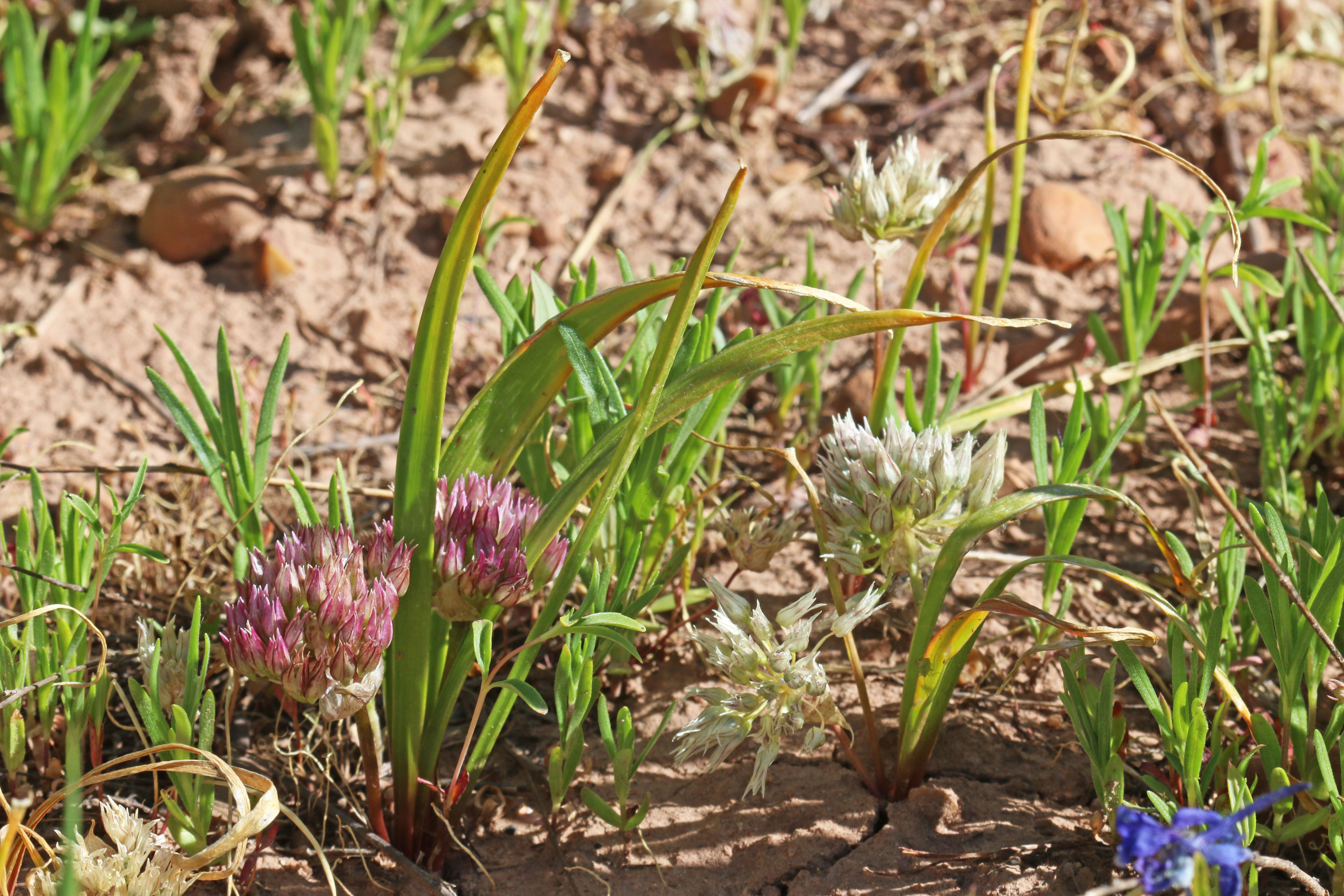

Conservation status
- Apparently Secure (NatureServe)

Scientific classification
- Kingdom: Plantae
- Clade: Tracheophytes
- Clade: Angiosperms
- Clade: Monocots
- Order: Asparagales
- Family: Amaryllidaceae
- Subfamily: Allioideae
- Genus: Allium
- Species: A. brandegeei

Binomial name
- Allium brandegeei S.Wats.

Synonyms
- Allium diehlii (M.E. Jones) M.E. Jones; Allium minimum M.E. Jones; Allium tribracteatum var. diehlii M.E. Jones

= Allium brandegeei =

Species of flowering plant

Allium brandegeei, also known by its common name, Brandegee’s Onion, is a plant species native to the western United States. It has been reported from western Colorado, Utah, Idaho, eastern Oregon, Park County, Montana and Elko County, Nevada.

Allium brandegeei grows in sandy, rocky soil at elevations of 1,200–3,300 metres (3,900–10,800 ft). One plant produces 1-5 round to egg-shaped bulbs up to 1.5 centimetres (0.59 in) in diameter. Flowers are bell-shaped, up 8 millimetres (0.31 in) long; tepals white with green or purple midvein.
