= Salix ligulifolia =

Conservation status
- Least Concern (IUCN 3.1)

Scientific classification
- Kingdom: Plantae
- Clade: Tracheophytes
- Clade: Angiosperms
- Clade: Eudicots
- Clade: Rosids
- Order: Malpighiales
- Family: Salicaceae
- Genus: Salix
- Species: S. ligulifolia

Binomial name
- Salix ligulifolia (C.R.Ball) C.R. Ball ex C.K.Schneid.

Species of willow

Salix ligulifolia is a species of willow known by the common name strapleaf willow. It is native to the western United States. It grows in moist and wet habitat, such as riverbanks, swamps, and floodplains, such as in the Sierra Nevada in California.

== Description ==
Salix ligulifolia is a shrub growing up to 8 meters tall. The lance-shaped leaves may grow over 13 centimeters long. They are finely serrated along the edges, with some leaves appearing almost smooth-edged or studded with glands. The inflorescence is a hairy catkin of flowers, male catkins short and stout, measuring up to 3 or 4 centimeters long, and female catkins often a bit longer.
