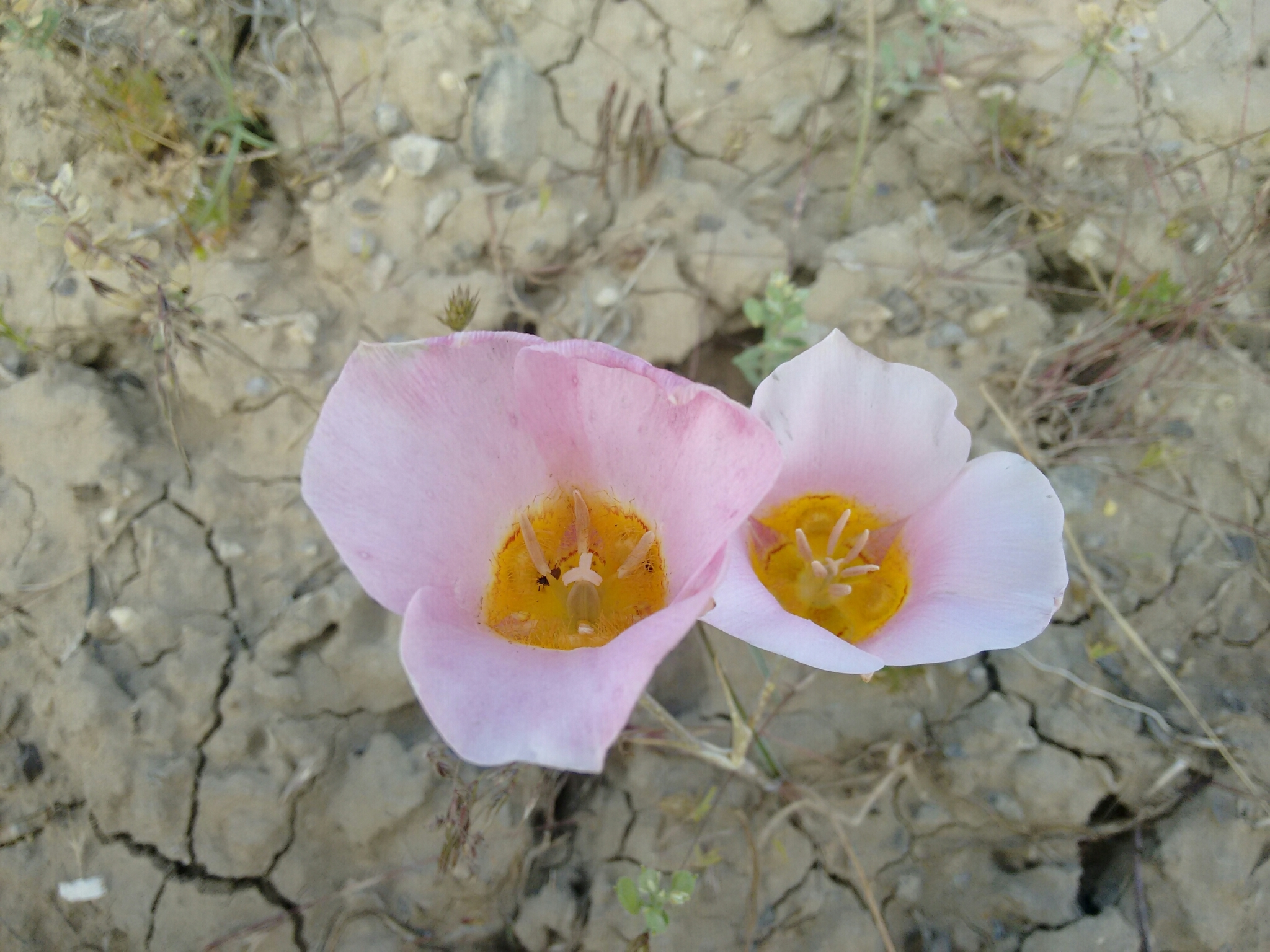
- Grand County, Utah, 2019

Scientific classification
- Kingdom: Plantae
- Clade: Tracheophytes
- Clade: Angiosperms
- Clade: Monocots
- Order: Liliales
- Family: Liliaceae
- Genus: Calochortus
- Species: C. ciscoensis

Binomial name
- Calochortus ciscoensis S.L.Welsh & N.D.Atwood

= Calochortus ciscoensis =

Species of flowering plant

Calochortus ciscoensis is a North American species of flowering plants in the lily family first described for modern science in 2008. It was originally described as only occurring only in eastern Utah (Uintah, Duchesne, and Grand Counties) but has since also been found in Mesa County, Colorado).

Calochortus ciscoensis is a bulb-forming perennial herb, each bulb producing several stalks up to 40 cm tall. Flowers range from white to pink. It typically lacks, or has a significantly reduced, chevron as compared to Calochortus nuttalli with which it is closely allied and may be confused. Unlike C. nuttalli, it tends to grow in clusters typically with multiple flowers and has long, drooping leaves that are present at the time of flowering, and it grows only at relatively low elevations on harsh substrates.
