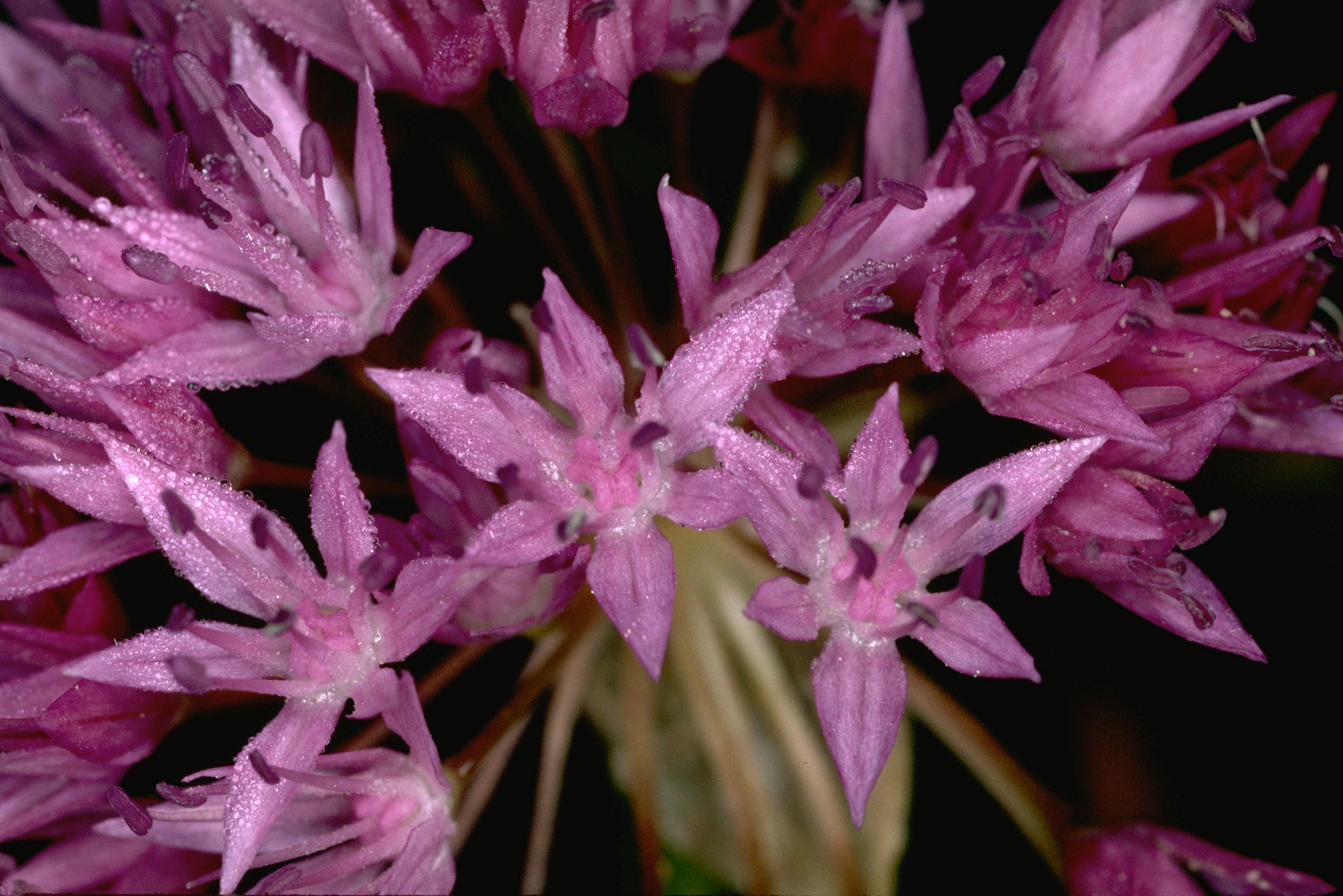

Scientific classification
- Kingdom: Plantae
- Clade: Tracheophytes
- Clade: Angiosperms
- Clade: Monocots
- Order: Asparagales
- Family: Amaryllidaceae
- Subfamily: Allioideae
- Genus: Allium
- Subgenus: A. subg. Amerallium
- Species: A. lemmonii

Binomial name
- Allium lemmonii S.Wats.

Synonyms
- Allium anceps var. lemmonii (S.Watson) Jeps.; Allium incisum A.Nelson & J.F.Macbr.; Allium scissum A.Nelson & J.F.Macbr.

= Allium lemmonii =

Lemmon's onion

Species of flowering plant

Allium lemmonii is a species of wild onion known by the common name Lemmon's onion, named for botanist John Gill Lemmon (1831–1908). It is native to the western United States, at elevations of 1200–1900 m in the Great Basin of Utah, Nevada, northern and eastern California, eastern Oregon, southwestern Idaho.

Lemmon's onion grows from a bulb one and a half to two centimeters wide and has a short, flattened stem up to 20 cm tall, which is thin along the edges. Atop the stem is an inflorescence of 10 to 40 bell-shaped flowers, which may be white to pink. The stamens may be purple or yellow; pollen is yellow. The ovary has a distinctive ridged mound shape in which all of the ovary parts appear melded together. This is a common plant in its native range. It favors dry clay soils.
