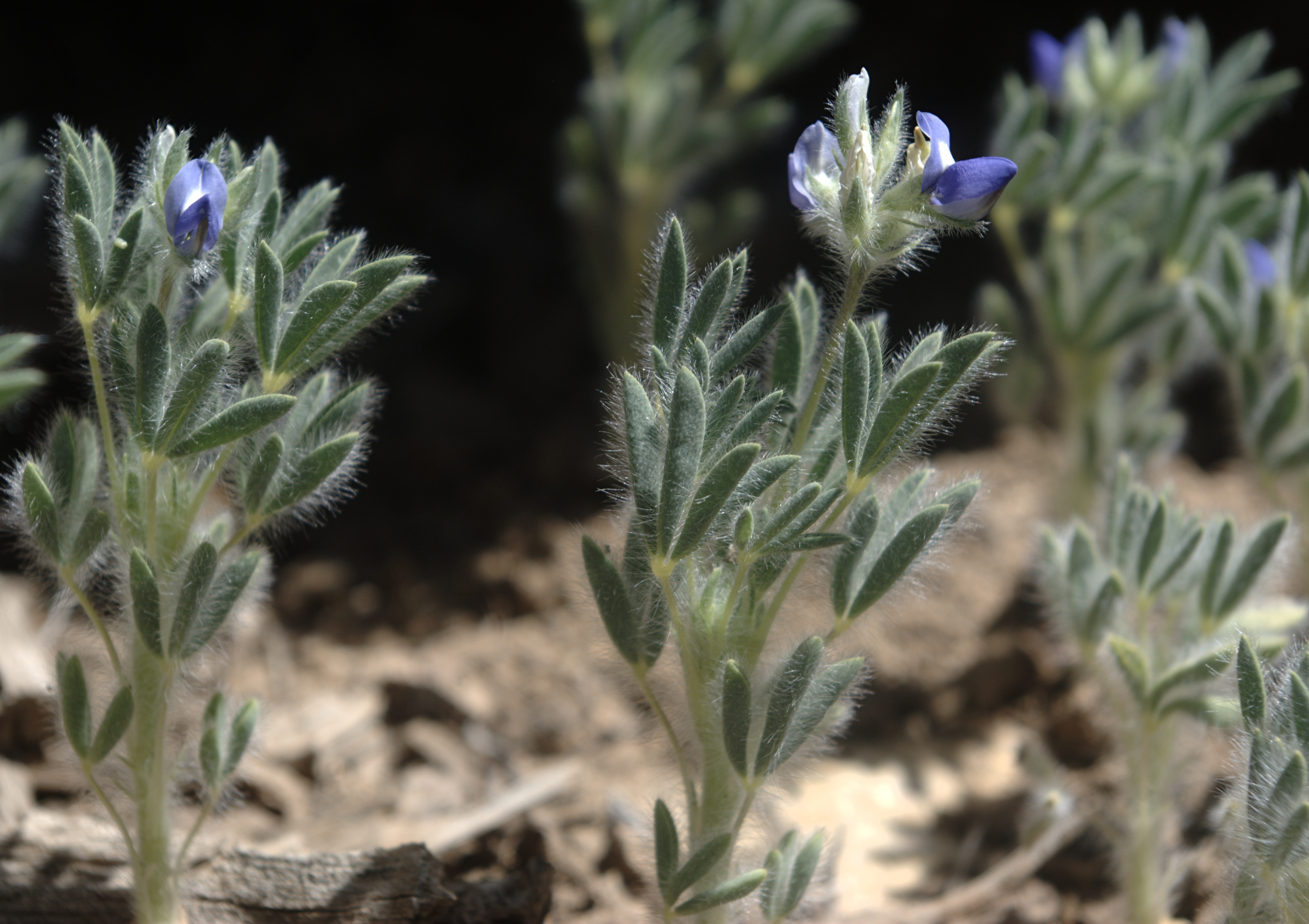

Conservation status
- Vulnerable (NatureServe)

Scientific classification
- Kingdom: Plantae
- Clade: Tracheophytes
- Clade: Angiosperms
- Clade: Eudicots
- Clade: Rosids
- Order: Fabales
- Family: Fabaceae
- Subfamily: Faboideae
- Genus: Lupinus
- Species: L. kingii

Binomial name
- Lupinus kingii S. Watson

Synonyms
- Lupinus argillaceus Wooton & Standley

= Lupinus kingii =

Species of legume

Lupinus kingii (King's lupine) is a species of Lupinus, family Fabaceae, which can be found in Arizona, Colorado, Nevada, New Mexico, Utah. Both the leaves and the pods are hairy with the later being 10 millimetres (0.39 in) long. In Utah, it is found only at Bryce Canyon National Park.
