= Allium passeyi =

Conservation status
- Critically Imperiled (NatureServe)

Scientific classification
- Kingdom: Plantae
- Clade: Tracheophytes
- Clade: Angiosperms
- Clade: Monocots
- Order: Asparagales
- Family: Amaryllidaceae
- Subfamily: Allioideae
- Genus: Allium
- Species: A. passeyi

Binomial name
- Allium passeyi N.H. Holmgren & A.H. Holmgren

Species of flowering plant

Allium passeyi is a plant species endemic to Box Elder County in northwestern Utah. It grows in shallow, stony locations at elevations of 1400–1600 m.

Allium passeyi produces 2-3 round to egg-shaped bulbs, each up to 2 cm in diameter. Flowers are bell-shaped, up to 9 mm in diameter; tepals pink; pollen yellow.
