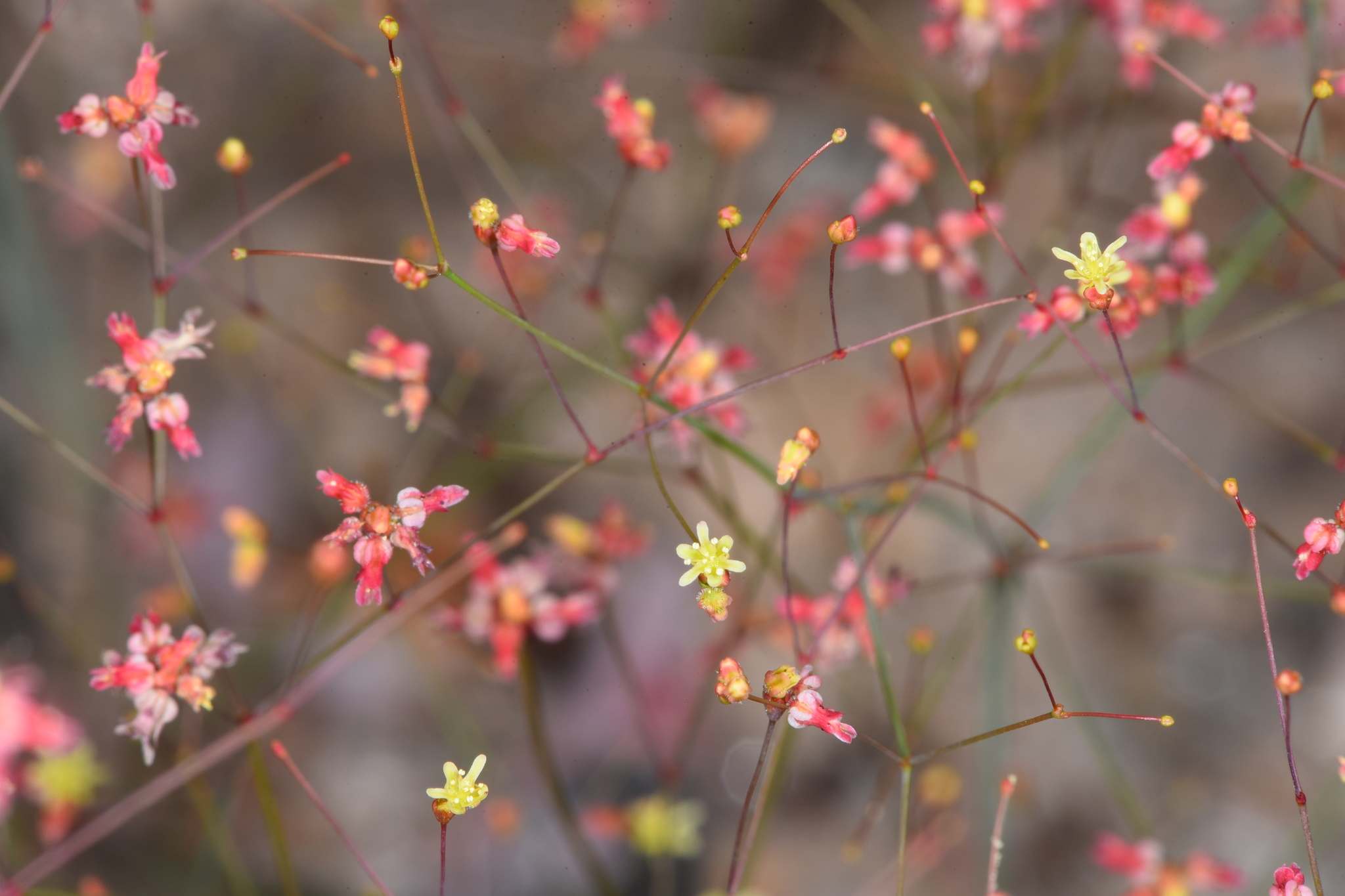

Conservation status
- Secure (NatureServe)

Scientific classification
- Kingdom: Plantae
- Clade: Tracheophytes
- Clade: Angiosperms
- Clade: Eudicots
- Order: Caryophyllales
- Family: Polygonaceae
- Genus: Eriogonum
- Species: E. thomasii

Binomial name
- Eriogonum thomasii Torr.

= Eriogonum thomasii =

Species of wild buckwheat

Eriogonum thomasii is a species of wild buckwheat known by the common name Thomas' buckwheat. It is native to the desert southwest of the United States and northern Mexico where it is common in many areas, sometimes becoming a weed.

== Description ==
It is a thin annual herb growing up to 30 centimeters tall, with a basal rosette of rounded leaves around the stem. The inflorescence is a wide open array of stem branches bearing clusters of tiny yellowish to pinkish flowers.
