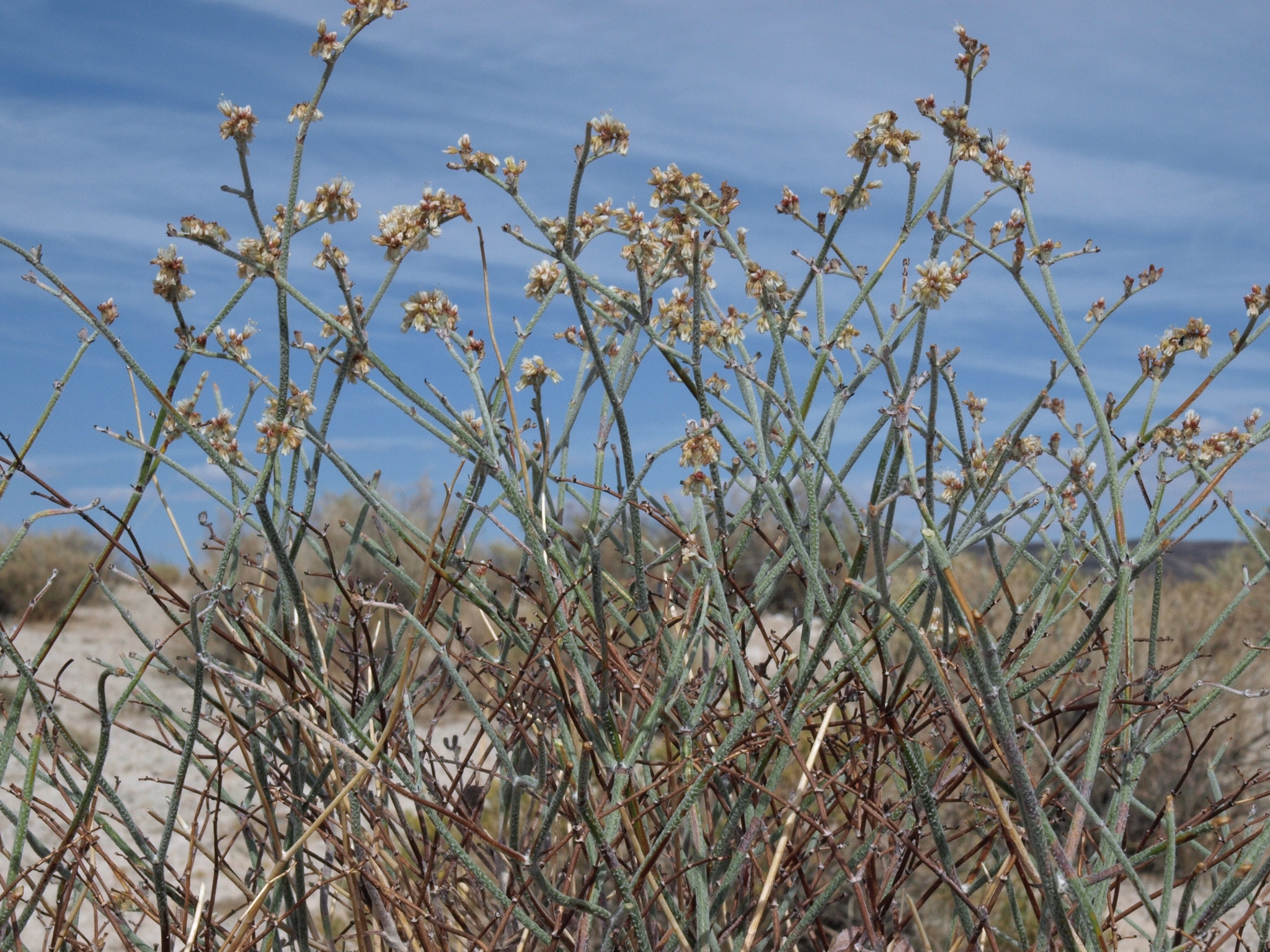

Scientific classification
- Kingdom: Plantae
- Clade: Tracheophytes
- Clade: Angiosperms
- Clade: Eudicots
- Order: Caryophyllales
- Family: Polygonaceae
- Genus: Eriogonum
- Species: E. nummulare

Binomial name
- Eriogonum nummulare M.E.Jones

Synonyms
- Eriogonum dudleyanum Eriogonum kearneyi

= Eriogonum nummulare =

Species of wild buckwheat

Eriogonum nummulare is a species of wild buckwheat known by the common names Kearney's buckwheat and money buckwheat. It is native to the Great Basin of the United States from California to Utah, where it grows on sandy slopes and plateaus.

This is a shrub reaching heights of anywhere from 30 centimeters to one meter and sprawling up to one and a half meters in width. It forms a pale green patch of woolly leaves at its base and produces a branching inflorescence which may have leaves on its thin stems. At each node along the inflorescence is a cluster of tiny flowers, which are usually white.
