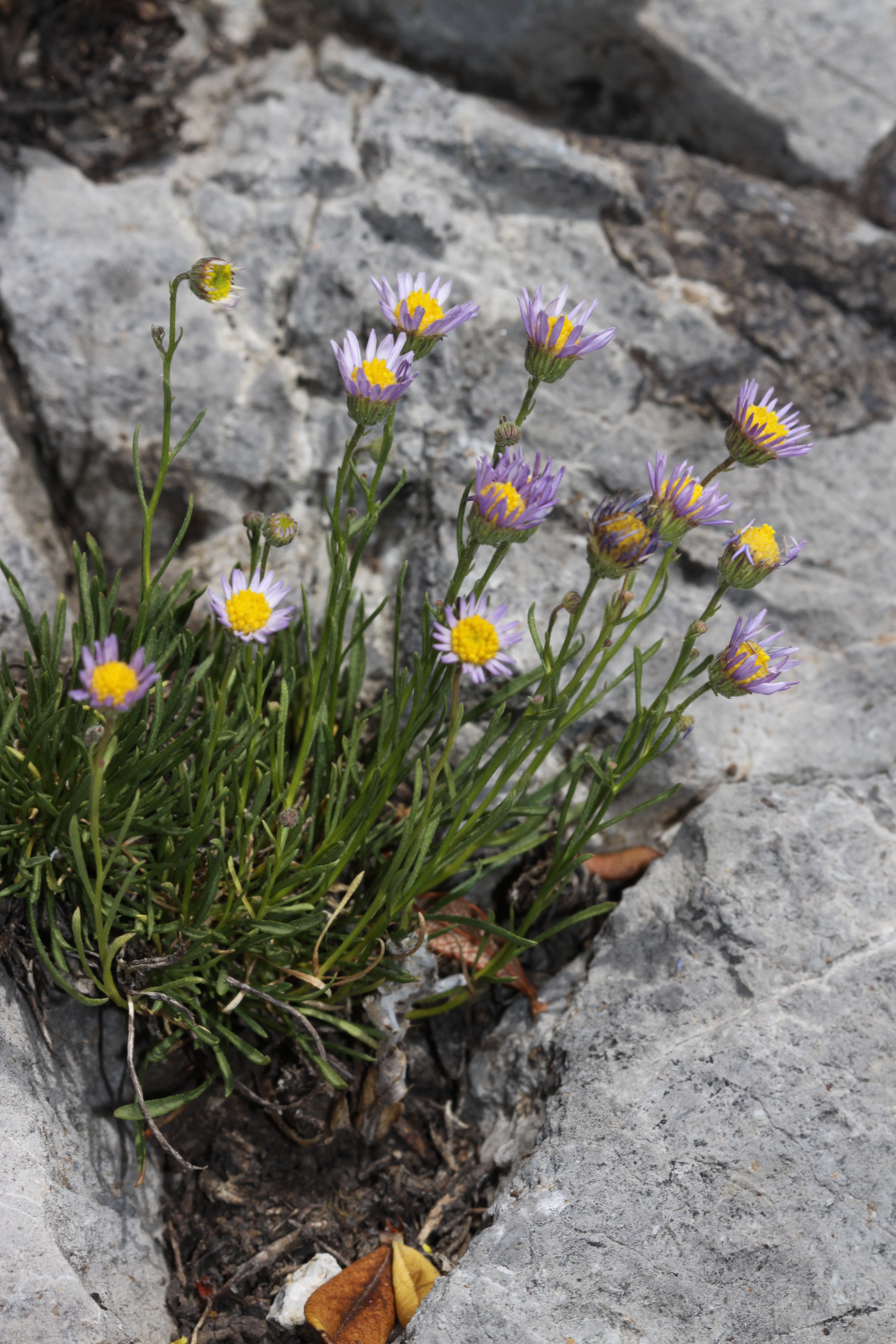

Scientific classification
- Kingdom: Plantae
- Clade: Tracheophytes
- Clade: Angiosperms
- Clade: Eudicots
- Clade: Asterids
- Order: Asterales
- Family: Asteraceae
- Genus: Erigeron
- Species: E. arenarioides

Binomial name
- Erigeron arenarioides (D.C.Eaton ex A.Gray) Rydb.

Synonyms
- Aster arenarioides D.C.Eaton ex A.Gray; Aster imbricatus Walp.; Erigeron stenophyllus D.C.Eaton 1871 not Hook. & Arn. 1836

= Erigeron arenarioides =

Species of flowering plant

Erigeron arenarioides, known by the common names sand fleabane and Wasatch fleabane, is a species of flowering plant in the family Asteraceae . It has been found only in the northern part of the state of Utah in the western United States.

Erigeron arenarioides is a perennial up to 30 cm (1 foot) tall. It usually has several flower heads, each with 10–25 blue ray florets surrounding a disc with many small yellow disc florets. The Latin epithet arenarioides means "sandwort-like," referring to its narrow leaves.
