= Erigeron goodrichii =

Conservation status
- Imperiled (NatureServe)

Scientific classification
- Kingdom: Plantae
- Clade: Tracheophytes
- Clade: Angiosperms
- Clade: Eudicots
- Clade: Asterids
- Order: Asterales
- Family: Asteraceae
- Genus: Erigeron
- Species: E. goodrichii

Binomial name
- Erigeron goodrichii S.L.Welsh

Species of flowering plant

Erigeron goodrichii is a rare species of flowering plant in the family Asteraceae known by the common name Uinta Mountain fleabane.

Erigeron goodrichii has been found only in the northeastern part of the state of Utah in the western United States. It grows at high elevations in the mountains, sometimes above tree line.

Erigeron goodrichii is a tiny perennial herb rarely more than 12 cm (4.8 inches) tall, producing a woody taproot. Stems and leaves are covered with hairs, some of them stiff. The plant sometimes produces only one flower heads per stem, sometimes 2 or 3. Each head contains as many as 60 blue ray florets surrounding numerous yellow disc florets.

The species is named for ecologist Sherel Goodrich (1943-) of Utah State University.
