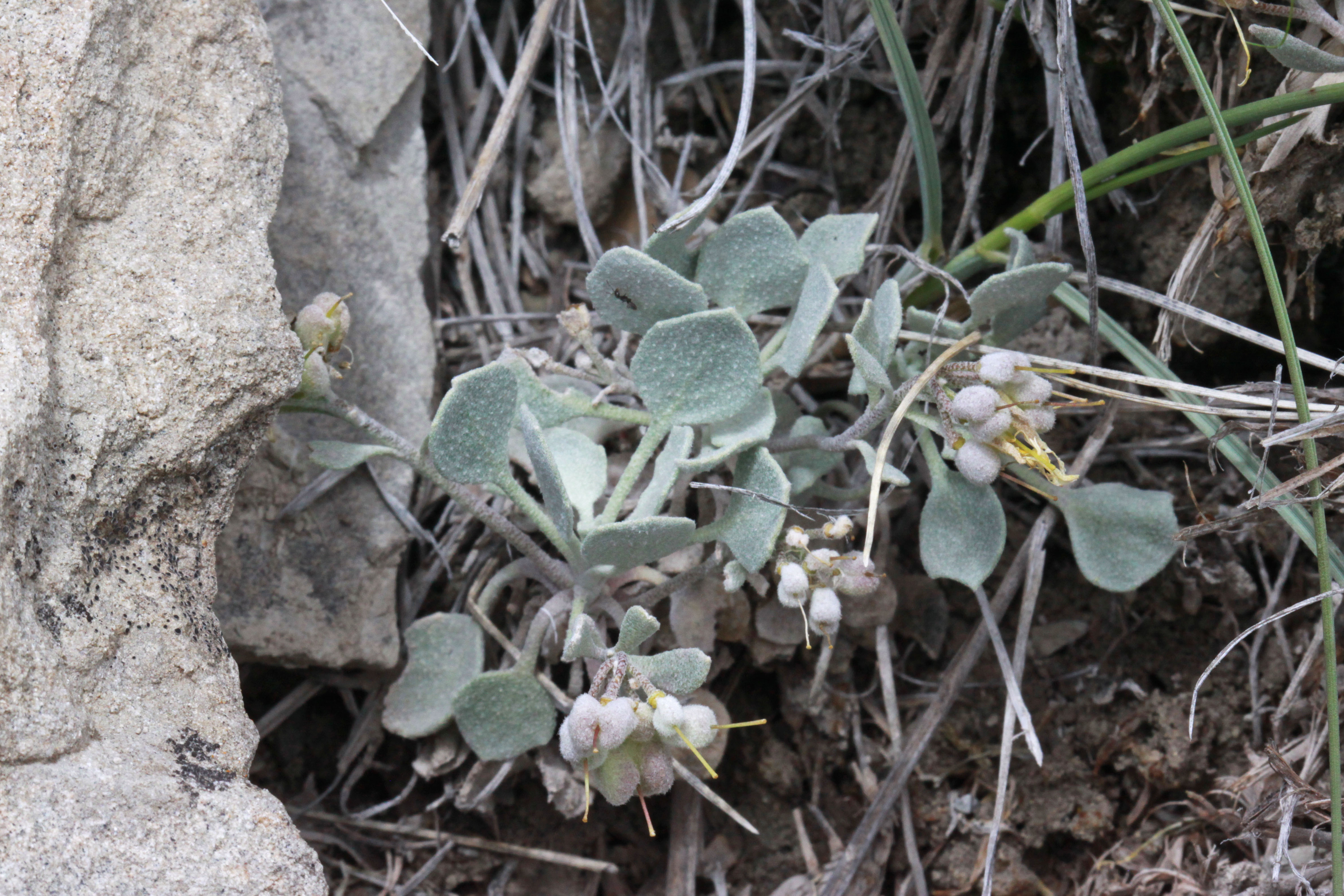

Scientific classification
- Kingdom: Plantae
- Clade: Tracheophytes
- Clade: Angiosperms
- Clade: Eudicots
- Clade: Rosids
- Order: Brassicales
- Family: Brassicaceae
- Genus: Physaria
- Species: P. repanda

Binomial name
- Physaria repanda Rollins, 1984

= Physaria repanda =

Species of flowering plant

Physaria repanda, the Indian Canyon twinpod, is a species of plant in the family Brassicaceae native to Utah. It is a perennial wildflower.

== Description ==
It has dense, stellate, and pubescent trichomes. Its caudex is thick, and around 1-2 dm long. Its radical leaves are rosulate and ascending. These leaves are about 4–7 cm long and 1-2.5 cm wide, and can be shaped broadly ovate to almost orbicular. Its cauline leaves are oblanceolate and measure 1.5–3 cm long. Its sepals are oblong and measure 7–9 mm long and 2–3 mm wide. Its petals are yellow, lingulate to spatulate, and measure 10–12 mm long and 3–4 mm wide. Its pedicels are ascending, and measure 1-1.5 cm long. Its siliques are didymous, densely pubescent, and can grow up to 1.5 cm high. Its replum can be pubescent or glabrous, and it measures 4–5 mm long. Its immature seeds are wingless and plump.
