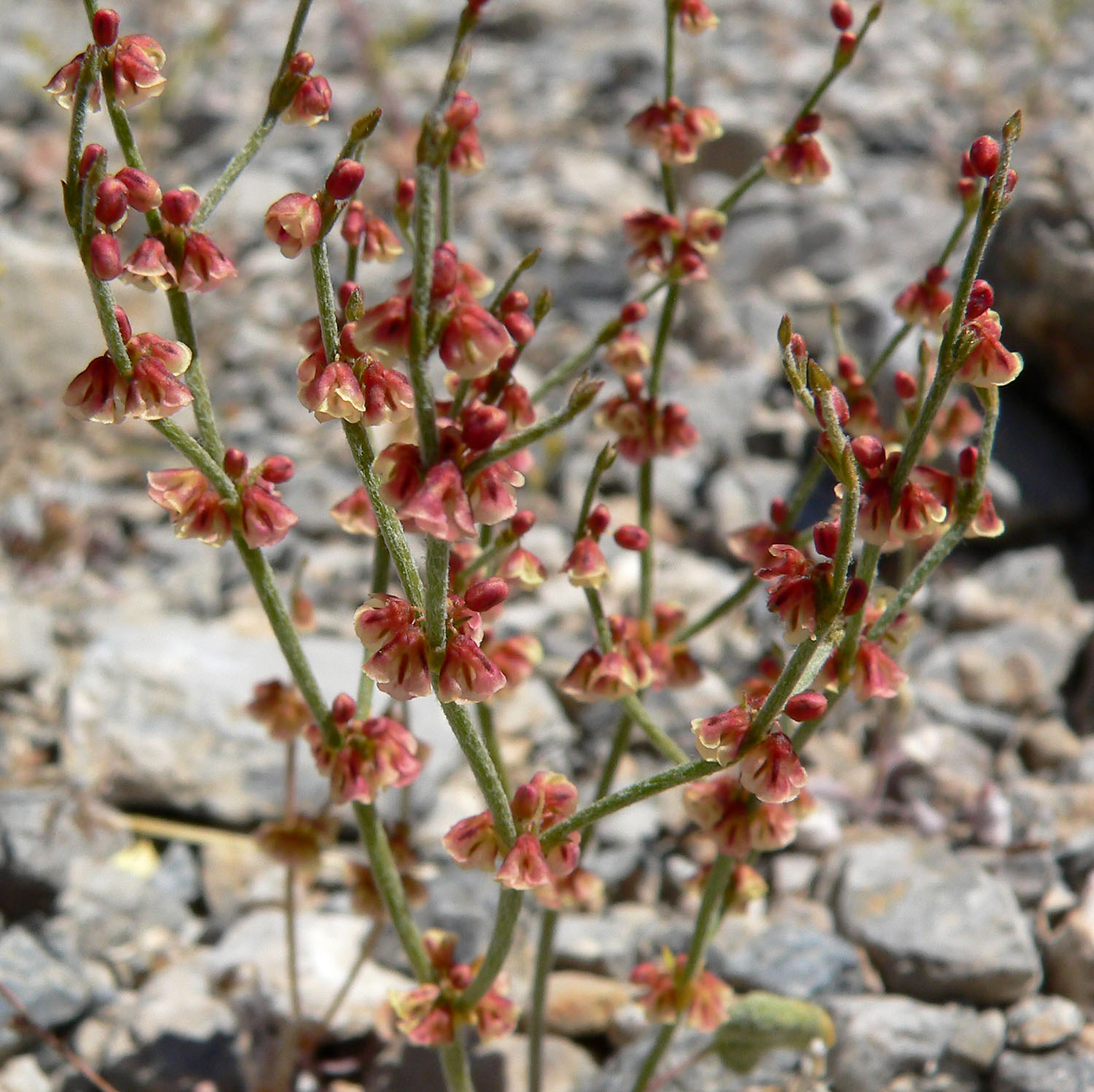

Scientific classification
- Kingdom: Plantae
- Clade: Tracheophytes
- Clade: Angiosperms
- Clade: Eudicots
- Order: Caryophyllales
- Family: Polygonaceae
- Genus: Eriogonum
- Species: E. nidularium

Binomial name
- Eriogonum nidularium Coville

= Eriogonum nidularium =

Species of wild buckwheat

Eriogonum nidularium is a species of wild buckwheat known by the common name birdnest buckwheat. It is native to the sandy flats and desert dry washes of the Mojave Desert and Great Basin in the western United States, where it is common and abundant. This is a distinctive annual herb producing a thin, multibranched stem which curves in on itself to form a rounded, tangled mass.

== Description ==
The plant resembles a bird nest, hence its common name. Its rounded form rarely reaches 30 centimeters in height and its curving twigs are mostly naked, the small leaves appearing mainly at the base of the plant.

When in bloom the plant produces tiny fan-shaped hanging clusters of flowers at nodes along the thin branches of the stem. The flowers are yellowish to pinkish, sometimes with small streaks of bright red.
