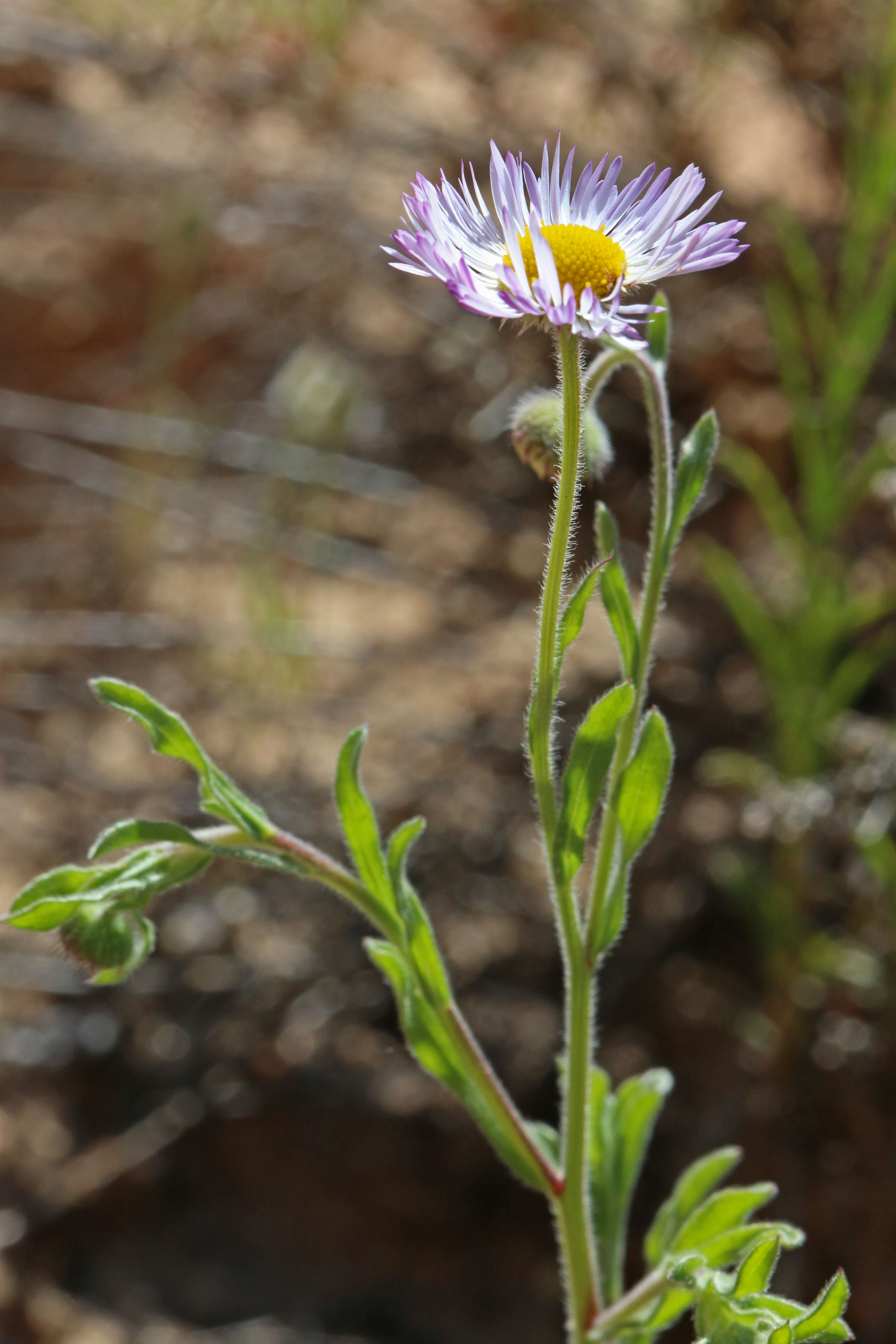
- In Utah

Scientific classification
- Kingdom: Plantae
- Clade: Tracheophytes
- Clade: Angiosperms
- Clade: Eudicots
- Clade: Asterids
- Order: Asterales
- Family: Asteraceae
- Genus: Erigeron
- Species: E. religiosus

Binomial name
- Erigeron religiosus Cronquist

= Erigeron religiosus =

Species of flowering plant

Erigeron religiosus is a North American species of flowering plant in the family Asteraceae known by the common name Clear Creek fleabane . It is native to the southwestern United States, in southern Utah and northern Arizona.

Erigeron religiosus grows in forested areas. It is an annual or perennial herb producing up to 40 centimeters (16 inches) long from a woody, branched underground caudex. The branching inflorescence can sometimes contain as many as 50 flower heads. Each head contains 37–85 white or lilac ray florets surrounding many yellow disc florets.
