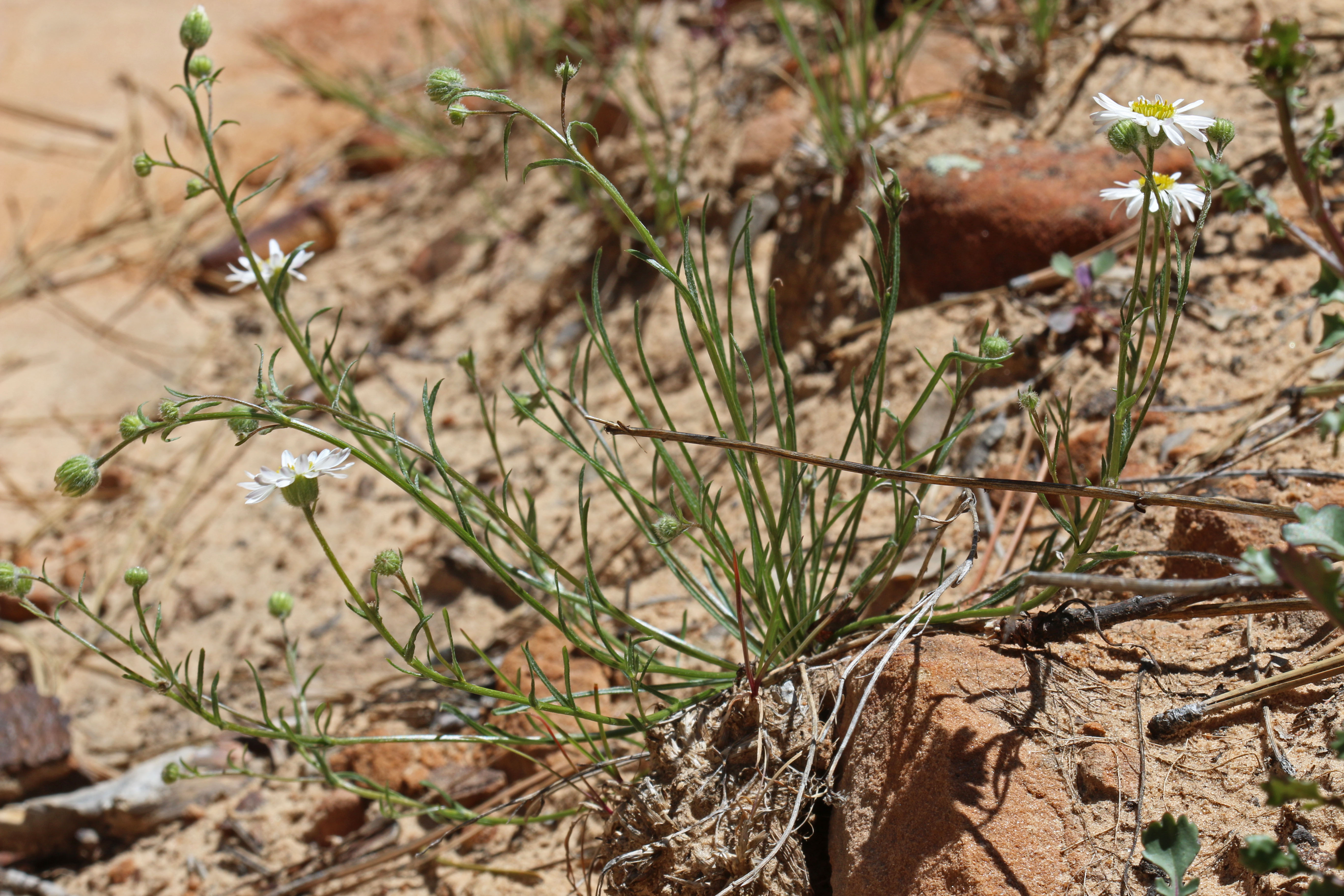

Scientific classification
- Kingdom: Plantae
- Clade: Embryophytes
- Clade: Tracheophytes
- Clade: Angiosperms
- Clade: Eudicots
- Clade: Asterids
- Order: Asterales
- Family: Asteraceae
- Genus: Erigeron
- Species: E. canaani

Binomial name
- Erigeron canaani S.L.Welsh

Synonyms
- Erigeron higginsii S.L.Welsh

= Erigeron canaani =

Species of flowering plant

Erigeron canaani is a rare species of flowering plant in the family Asteraceae known by the common name Abajo fleabane. It has been found only in southern Utah, in sandy soil and in cracks on cliff faces in Washington, Kane, and San Juan Counties.

Erigeron canaani is a perennial herb up to 30 cm (12 inches) tall, producing a taproot. One plant can produce several flower heads, sometimes one per branch, sometimes in groups of 2 or 3. Each head has 15–22 white or purpleray florets, plus numerous small yellow disc florets.

The species is named for Canaan Mountain south of Zion National Park. The common name "Abajo fleabane" refers to the Abajo Mountains south of Canyonlands National Park.
