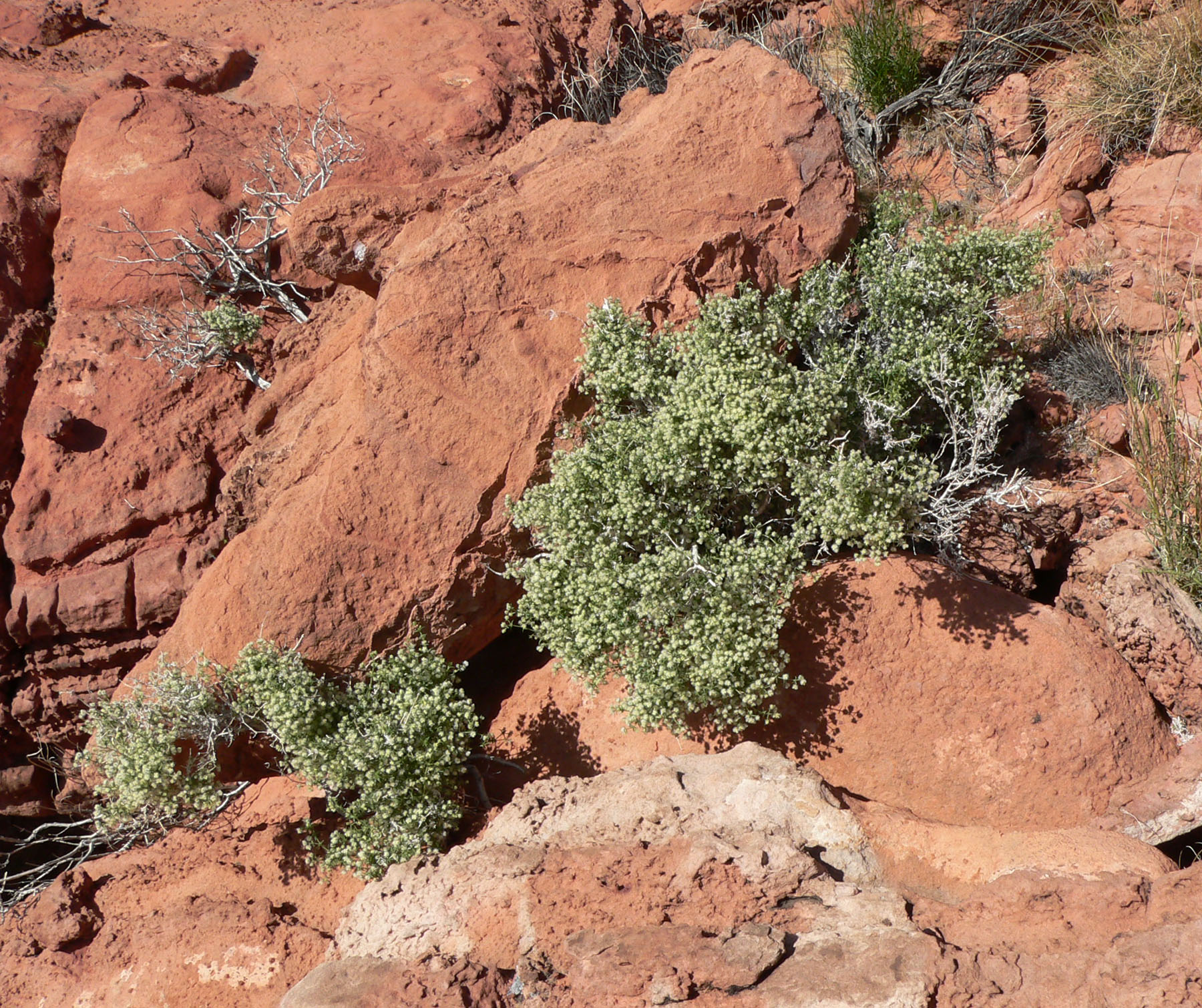

Scientific classification
- Kingdom: Plantae
- Clade: Tracheophytes
- Clade: Angiosperms
- Clade: Eudicots
- Clade: Asterids
- Order: Gentianales
- Family: Rubiaceae
- Genus: Galium
- Species: G. stellatum

Binomial name
- Galium stellatum Kellogg

= Galium stellatum =

Species of plant

Galium stellatum, the starry bedstraw or desert bedstraw, is a species of plant in the family Rubiaceae. It is widespread across most of Arizona, and found also in Baja California, Baja California Sur, southeastern California (Inyo, San Bernardino, Riverside, Imperial and San Diego Counties), Nevada (Clark, Nye and Lincoln Cos.), Utah (Washington County). It is dioecious, with male and female flowers on separate plants.
