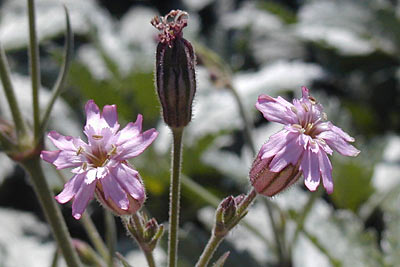

Scientific classification
- Kingdom: Plantae
- Clade: Tracheophytes
- Clade: Angiosperms
- Clade: Eudicots
- Order: Caryophyllales
- Family: Caryophyllaceae
- Genus: Silene
- Species: S. verecunda

Binomial name
- Silene verecunda S.Watson

= Silene verecunda =

Species of flowering plant

Silene verecunda is a species of flowering plant in the family Caryophyllaceae known by the common name San Francisco campion.

It is native to western North America, particularly California and Baja California, as well as Nevada and Utah. It grows in a number of habitat types, from coastline to high alpine mountain slopes, and including chaparral, woodlands, and meadows.

== Description ==
Silene verecunda is an extremely variable plant. In general, it is a perennial herb growing 10 centimeters to over half a meter tall, usually with several erect stems. It is hairy, and usually glandular and sticky in texture. The lance-shaped leaves are variable in size, the largest ones usually growing at the caudex.

Each flower is encapsulated in a tubular calyx of fused sepals which is lined with ten veins. The petals are white or pink and have two lobes in their tips and two appendages at their bases.
