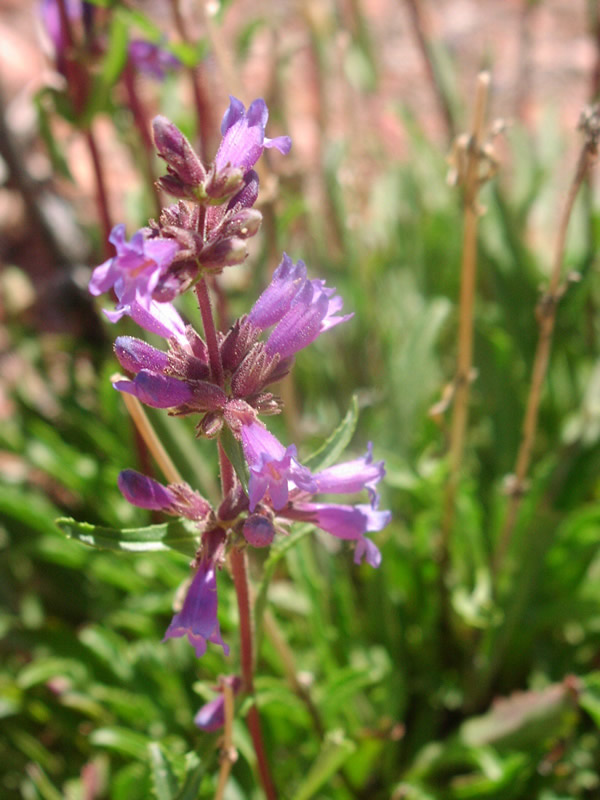

Conservation status
- Critically Imperiled (NatureServe)

Scientific classification
- Kingdom: Plantae
- Clade: Tracheophytes
- Clade: Angiosperms
- Clade: Eudicots
- Clade: Asterids
- Order: Lamiales
- Family: Plantaginaceae
- Genus: Penstemon
- Species: P. pinorum

Binomial name
- Penstemon pinorum L.& J. Shultz

= Penstemon pinorum =

Species of flowering plant

Penstemon pinorum is a rare species of flowering plant in the plantain family known by the common names Pine Valley penstemon and pinyon penstemon. It is endemic to Utah in the United States, where it is known only from an area along the border between Washington and Iron Counties.

This plant was first described in 1985. It grows up to 21 centimeters tall, the stems arising from a woody caudex and fleshy root system. The lance-shaped leaves are up to 8 centimeters long and have wavy-toothed edges. The herbage is hairy. The inflorescence is a thyrse of flowers each about a centimeter long or slightly larger. The flower has a calyx of pointed sepals and a purple-blue bearded corolla. Protruding from the corolla is a staminode covered in light orange hairs. Blooming occurs in May and June.

This plant grows in pinyon-juniper woodland, in washes with soil rich in red basalt and hematite.

There are only three locations where this plant may be found. It grows on an area of land totalling about 485 hectares. Within this small range it can be locally abundant, with an estimated total of 50,000 individuals. The plant's range is located southwest of Newcastle, Utah, and east of Old Iron Town.

This plant is threatened by firewood harvesting, which has caused habitat destruction in the area. It may also be threatened by mining operations.
