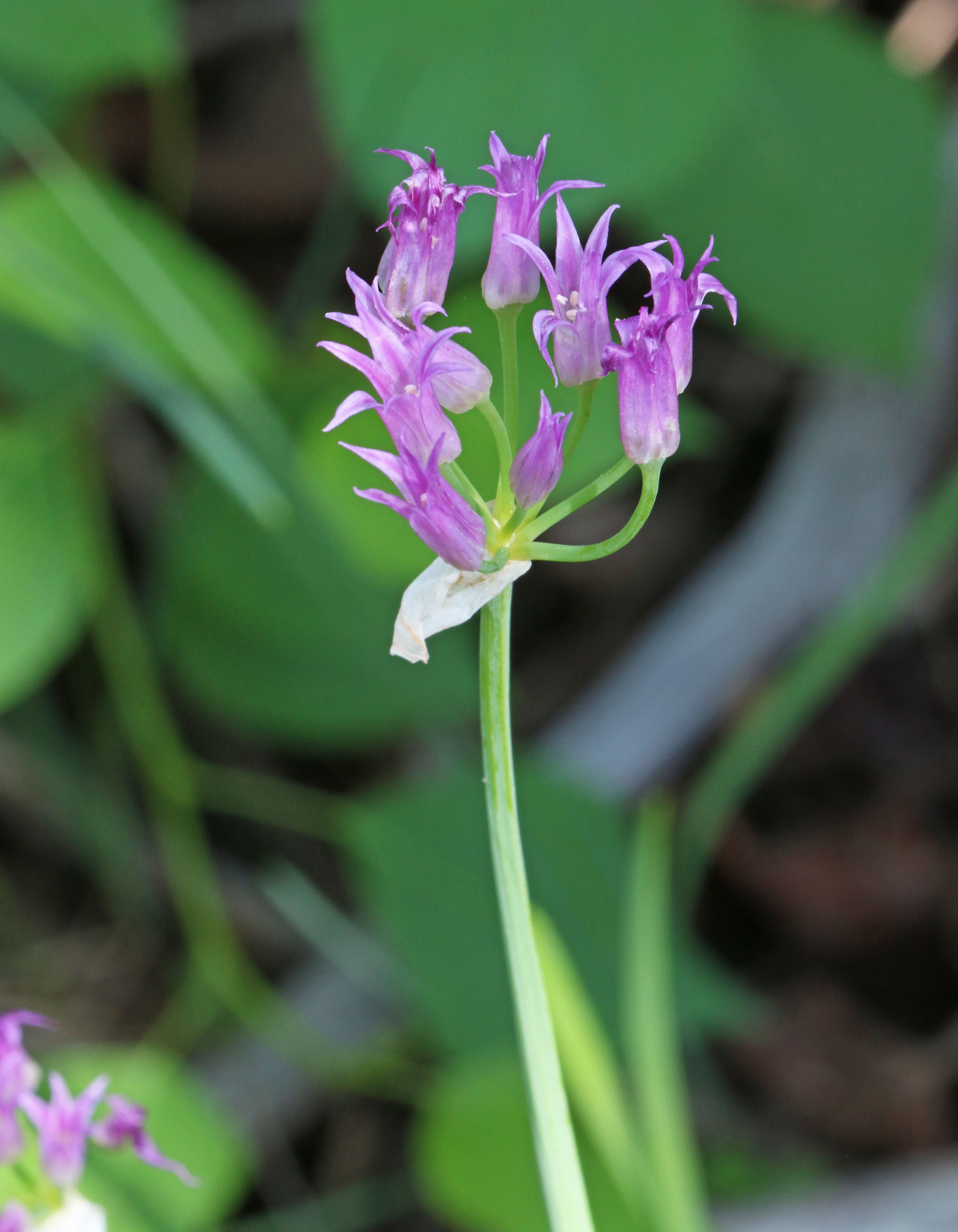

Conservation status
- Apparently Secure (NatureServe)

Scientific classification
- Kingdom: Plantae
- Clade: Tracheophytes
- Clade: Angiosperms
- Clade: Monocots
- Order: Asparagales
- Family: Amaryllidaceae
- Subfamily: Allioideae
- Genus: Allium
- Subgenus: A. subg. Amerallium
- Species: A. brevistylum

Binomial name
- Allium brevistylum S.Wats.

= Allium brevistylum =

Species of flowering plant

Allium brevistylum is a plant species native to the western United States. It grows in meadows and along stream banks high in the mountains of Colorado, Utah, Wyoming, Montana and Idaho, at elevations of 2200–3400 m.

Allium brevistylum produces a thick, Iris-like underground rhizome, at the ends of which are bulbs up to 3 cm in diameter. Scapes are up to 60 cm tall, flattened and with narrow wings. Flowers are urn-shaped, up to 15 mm long; tepals pink with thick midribs; anthers and pollen yellow.
