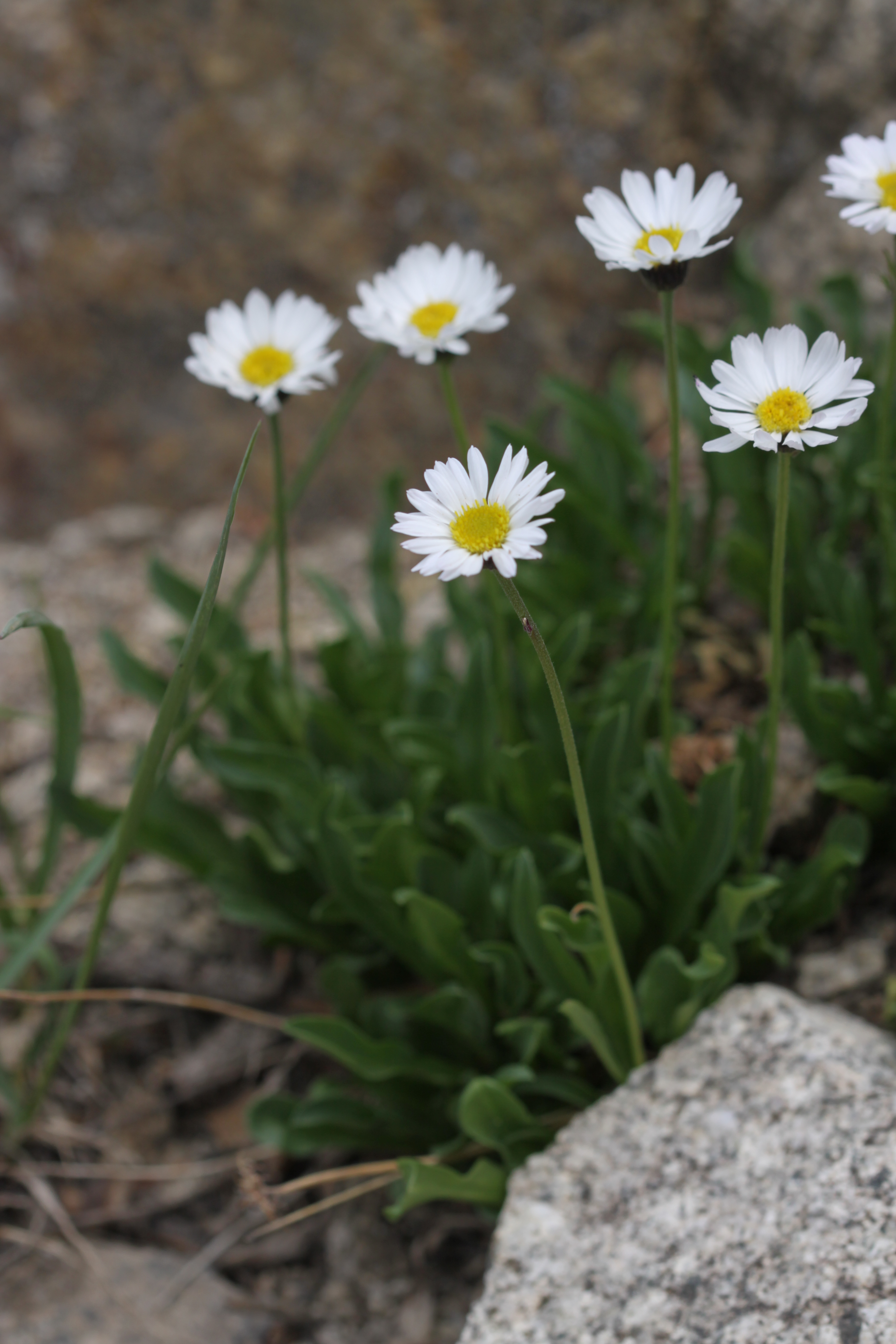

Scientific classification
- Kingdom: Plantae
- Clade: Tracheophytes
- Clade: Angiosperms
- Clade: Eudicots
- Clade: Asterids
- Order: Asterales
- Family: Asteraceae
- Genus: Erigeron
- Species: E. garrettii

Binomial name
- Erigeron garrettii A.Nelson

Synonyms
- Erigeron controversus Greene

= Erigeron garrettii =

Species of flowering plant

Erigeron garrettii is a rare North American species of flowering plants in the family Asteraceae known by the common name Garrett's fleabane.

Erigeron garrettii has been found only in the north-central part of the State of Utah in the western United States. It grows in cracks in cliff faces and in rocky soil between boulders. It grows up to 23 cm (9 inches) tall, and produces a woody taproot. The plant produces only flower head per stem, the head containing golden yellow disc florets surrounded by as many as 25 white ray florets.
