= Draba burkei =

Scientific classification
- Kingdom: Plantae
- Clade: Tracheophytes
- Clade: Angiosperms
- Clade: Eudicots
- Clade: Rosids
- Order: Brassicales
- Family: Brassicaceae
- Genus: Draba
- Species: D. burkei

Binomial name
- Draba burkei (C.L.Hitchc.) Windham & Beilstein

Species of flowering plant

Draba burkei is a species of flowering plant in the family Brassicaceae known by the common names snowbasin draba and Burke's draba. It is endemic to Utah in the United States, where it is known from Box Elder, Cache, Morgan, and Weber Counties. This plant was considered a variety of Draba maguirei until 2004, when it was elevated to species status.

This perennial herb has a branching caudex and forms clumps or mats. The stems are just a few centimeters long. The leaves are located on the caudex and in rosettes at the ends of the branches. The inflorescence is a raceme of up to 10 flowers with yellow petals about half a centimeter long.

This plant grows on outcroppings of quartzite, limestone, and calcareous shale.

One population of this plant had to be dug up and moved to the Denver Botanic Gardens to make way for a ski slope built for the 2002 Winter Olympics.
