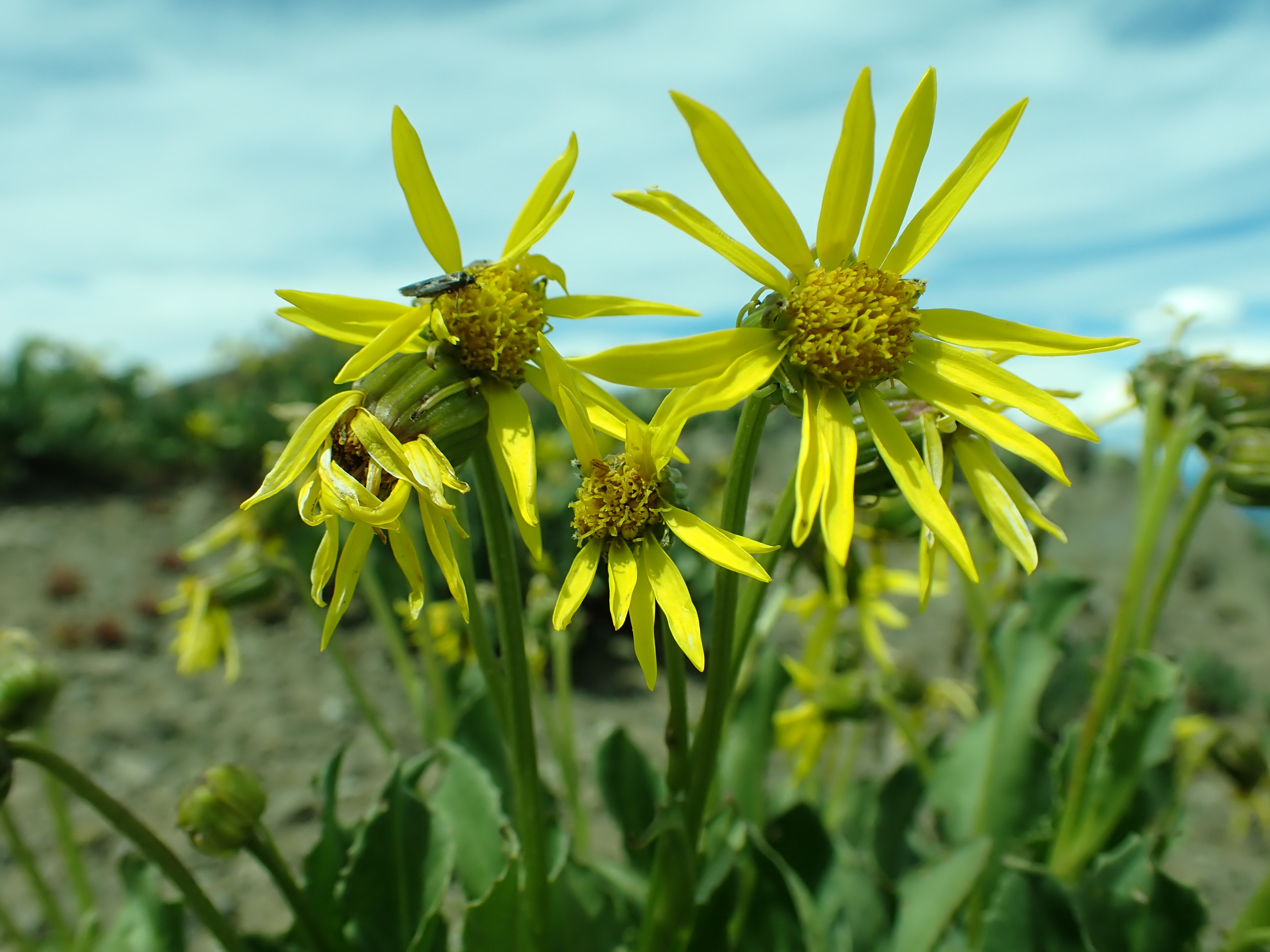

Conservation status
- Apparently Secure (NatureServe)

Scientific classification
- Kingdom: Plantae
- Clade: Tracheophytes
- Clade: Angiosperms
- Clade: Eudicots
- Clade: Asterids
- Order: Asterales
- Family: Asteraceae
- Genus: Senecio
- Species: S. bigelovii

Binomial name
- Senecio bigelovii A.Gray

= Senecio bigelovii =

Species of herb

Senecio bigelovii or nodding groundsel or nodding ragwort is a perennial herb found in the Southwestern United States.

== Description ==
The plant can grow up to 90 centimetres (35 in) tall. The leaves are up to 20 cm (8 in) long. Blooming from July to September, the yellow flower heads are 1.5 cm (1/2 in) wide.

=== Similar species ===
S. amplectens and S. neowebsteri can appear similar.

== Distribution and habitat ==
Native to the Colorado Plateau region of the United States, the species inhabits moist soil in grassy areas and forests.
