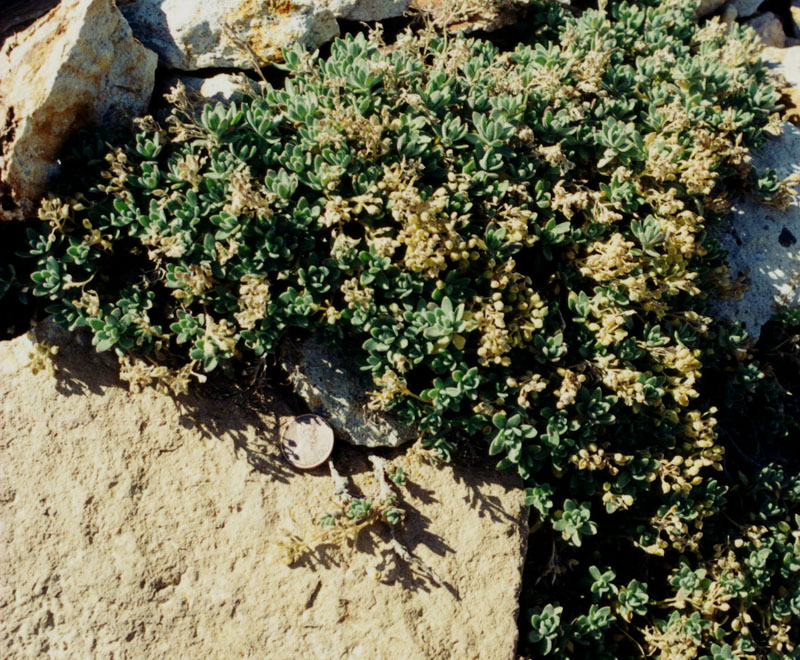

Conservation status
- Critically Imperiled (NatureServe)

Scientific classification
- Kingdom: Plantae
- Clade: Tracheophytes
- Clade: Angiosperms
- Clade: Eudicots
- Clade: Rosids
- Order: Brassicales
- Family: Brassicaceae
- Genus: Draba
- Species: D. ramulosa

Binomial name
- Draba ramulosa Rollins

= Draba ramulosa =

Species of flowering plant

Draba ramulosa is a rare species of flowering plant in the family Brassicaceae known by the common names Mt. Belknap draba and Tushar Mountain draba. It is endemic to Utah, where it is known only from Mt. Belknap in the Tushar Mountains in Beaver and Piute Counties.

This small plant has creeping, hairy branches forming a mat of grayish herbage. The gray-green leaves are up to a centimeter long. The inflorescence is a raceme of up to 15 flowers. Each flower has pale yellow petals 3 or 4 millimeters long. Blooming occurs in June through August. The fruit is a flattened oval silique.

This plant grows on the rocky slopes of a single mountain in south-central Utah. It occurs above the timberline at 3350 to 3660 meters elevation.
