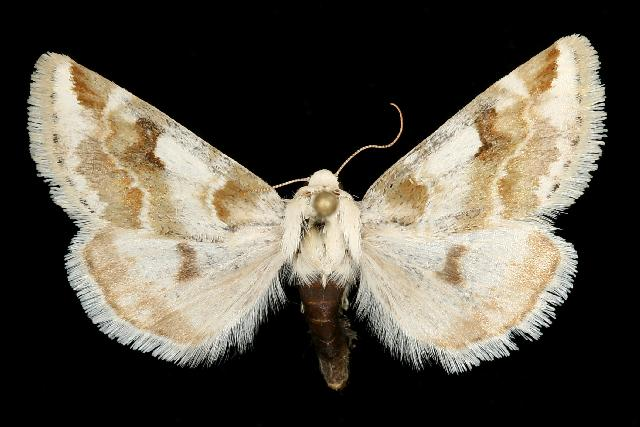

Scientific classification
- Domain: Eukaryota
- Kingdom: Animalia
- Phylum: Arthropoda
- Class: Insecta
- Order: Lepidoptera
- Superfamily: Noctuoidea
- Family: Noctuidae
- Genus: Schinia
- Species: S. unimacula

Binomial name
- Schinia unimacula Smith, 1891

Synonyms
- Schinia coolidgei Hill, 1924

= Schinia unimacula =

Species of moth

The rabbitbush flower moth (Schinia unimacula) is a moth of the family Noctuidae. It is found from central Arizona and New Mexico, north to Colorado, south-western Wyoming and Utah, west to Nevada and California, and north to Oregon, Idaho and Washington.

The wingspan is about 25 mm. Adults are on wing from July to October.

The larvae feed on Ericameria species, including Ericameria nauseosa and Ericameria paniculata.
