= E. crispa =

E. crispa may refer to:

- Ericameria crispa, a shrub species in the genus Ericameria
- Euclea crispa, a flowering plant species in the genus Euclea
- Euphorbia crispa, a noticeably succulent plant species in the genus Euphorbia

== See also ==
- Crispa (disambiguation)
