= Rubberweed =

Rubberweed is a common name that may refer to any of several plants in the daisy family, Asteraceae, including:

- Genus Hymenoxys, the rubberweeds or bitterweeds
- Ericameria nana, also known as dwarf goldenbush
