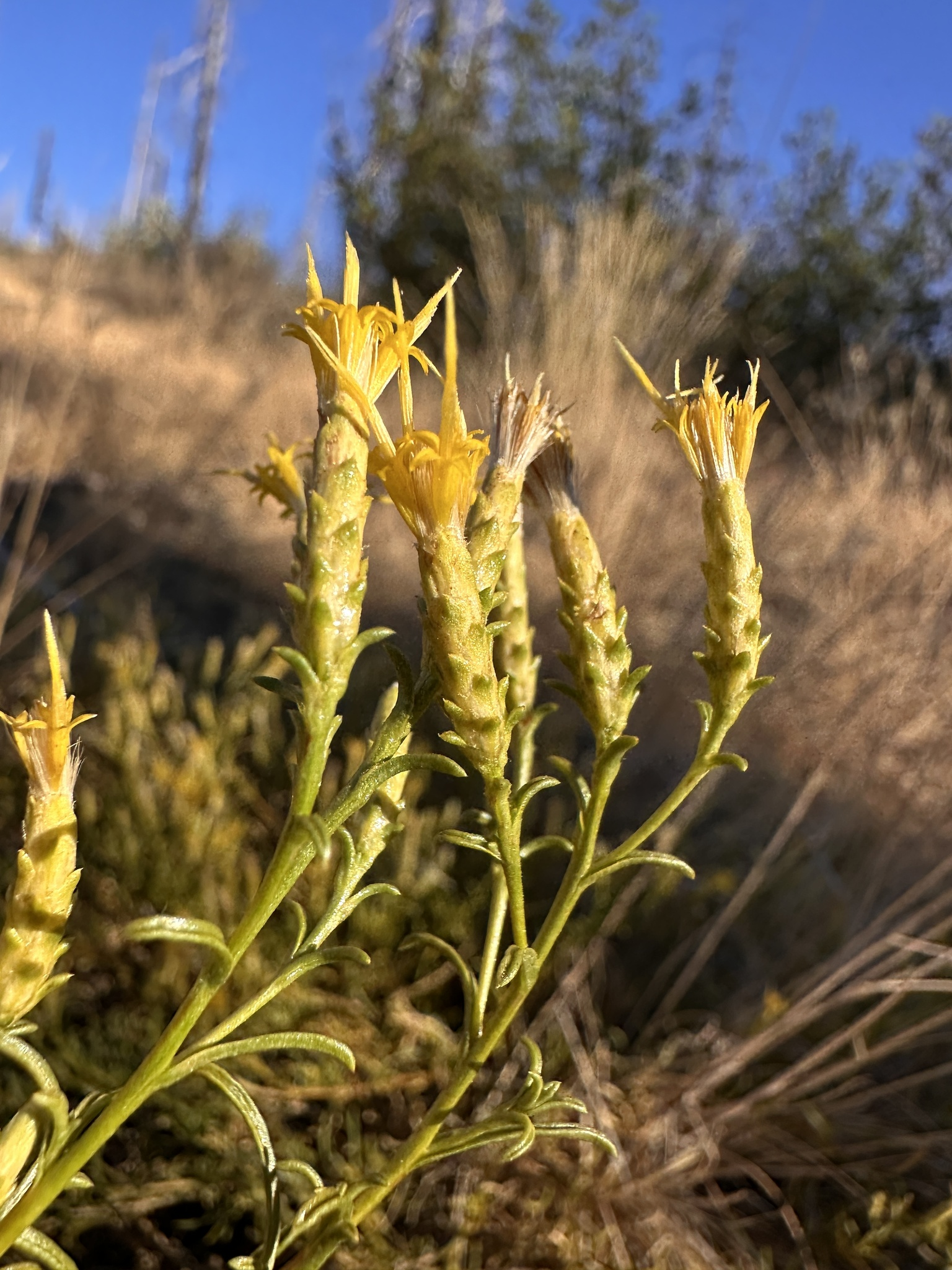

Conservation status
- Apparently Secure (NatureServe)

Scientific classification
- Kingdom: Plantae
- Clade: Tracheophytes
- Clade: Angiosperms
- Clade: Eudicots
- Clade: Asterids
- Order: Asterales
- Family: Asteraceae
- Genus: Ericameria
- Species: E. ophitidis

Binomial name
- Ericameria ophitidis (J.T.Howell) G.L.Nesom

Synonyms
- Haplopappus bloomeri var. ophitidis J.T.Howell; Haplopappus ophitidis (J.T.Howell) D.D.Keck

= Ericameria ophitidis =

Plant species in the daisy family

Ericameria ophitidis is a North American species of flowering shrubs in the family Asteraceae. It is native to the northern part of the state of California in the western United States. It has been found only in three counties: Trinity County, western Tehama County, and the southwestern corner of Shasta County. It is called the serpentine goldenbush because it grows on serpentine soil, toxic to many other plants.

Ericameria ophitidis is a shrub up to 30 cm (12 inches or 1 foot) tall. It has narrow, linear leaves up to 15 mm (0.6 inches) long. Flower heads are yellow, solitary or in flat-topped arrays, each head with 5 or 6 disc florets but no ray florets.

== Taxonomy ==
Ericameria ophitidis was first scientifically described in 1950 as a variety of Haplopappus bloomeri by John Thomas Howell in 1950. It was elevated to a species in the Haplopappus genus in 1958 by David D. Keck and finally moved to Ericameria in 1990 by Guy L. Nesom. Its genus is classified in the Asteraceae family and the species has no varieties.
