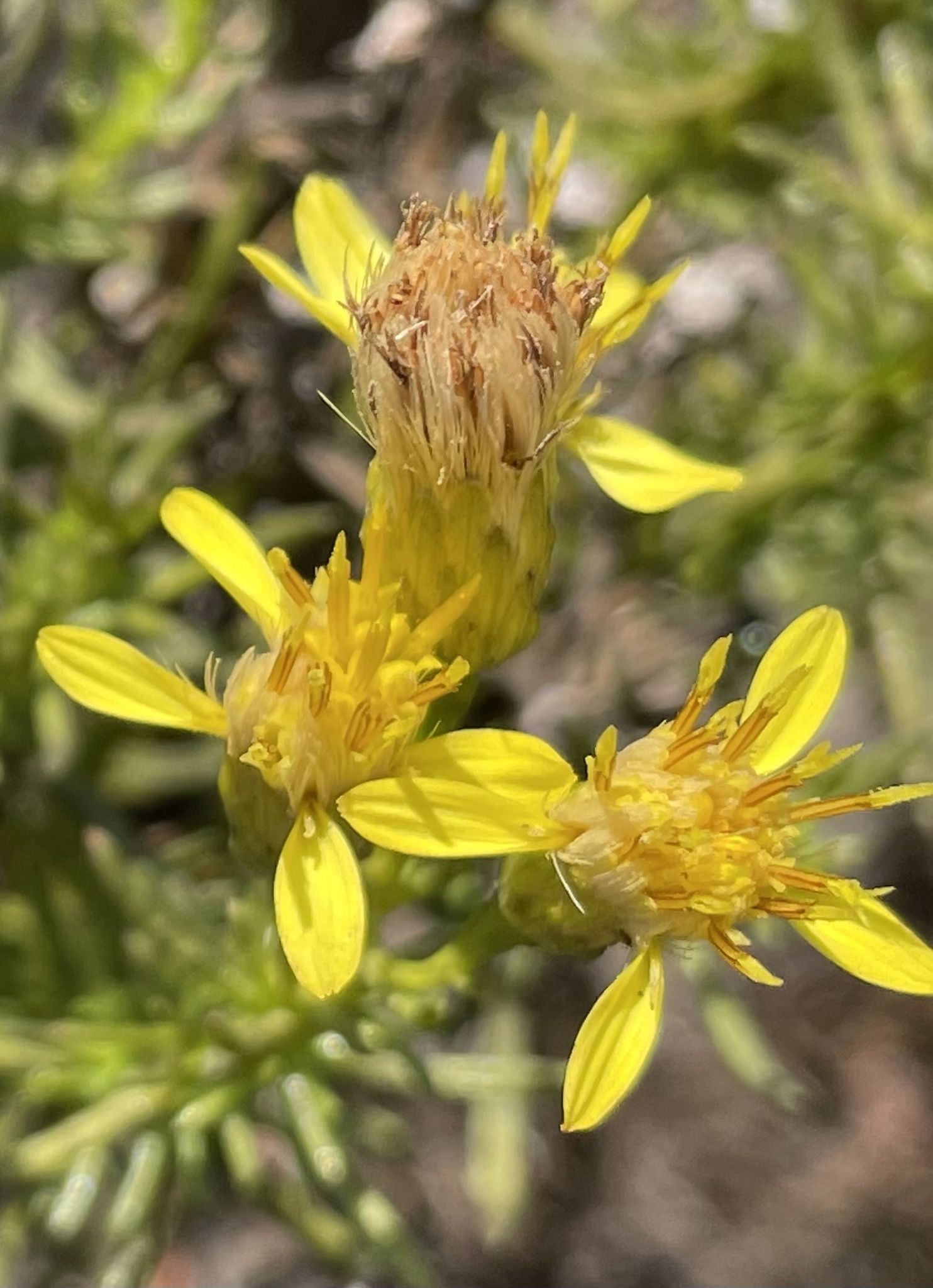

Conservation status
- Imperiled (NatureServe)

Scientific classification
- Kingdom: Plantae
- Clade: Tracheophytes
- Clade: Angiosperms
- Clade: Eudicots
- Clade: Asterids
- Order: Asterales
- Family: Asteraceae
- Genus: Ericameria
- Species: E. fasciculata

Binomial name
- Ericameria fasciculata (Eastw.) J.F.Macbr.

Synonyms
- Chrysoma fasciculata Eastw.; Haplopappus eastwoodae H.M.Hall; Aplopappus eastwoodae H.M.Hall; Haplopappus eastwoodiae H.M.Hall; Aplopappus eastwoodiae H.M.Hall

= Ericameria fasciculata =

Species of flowering plant

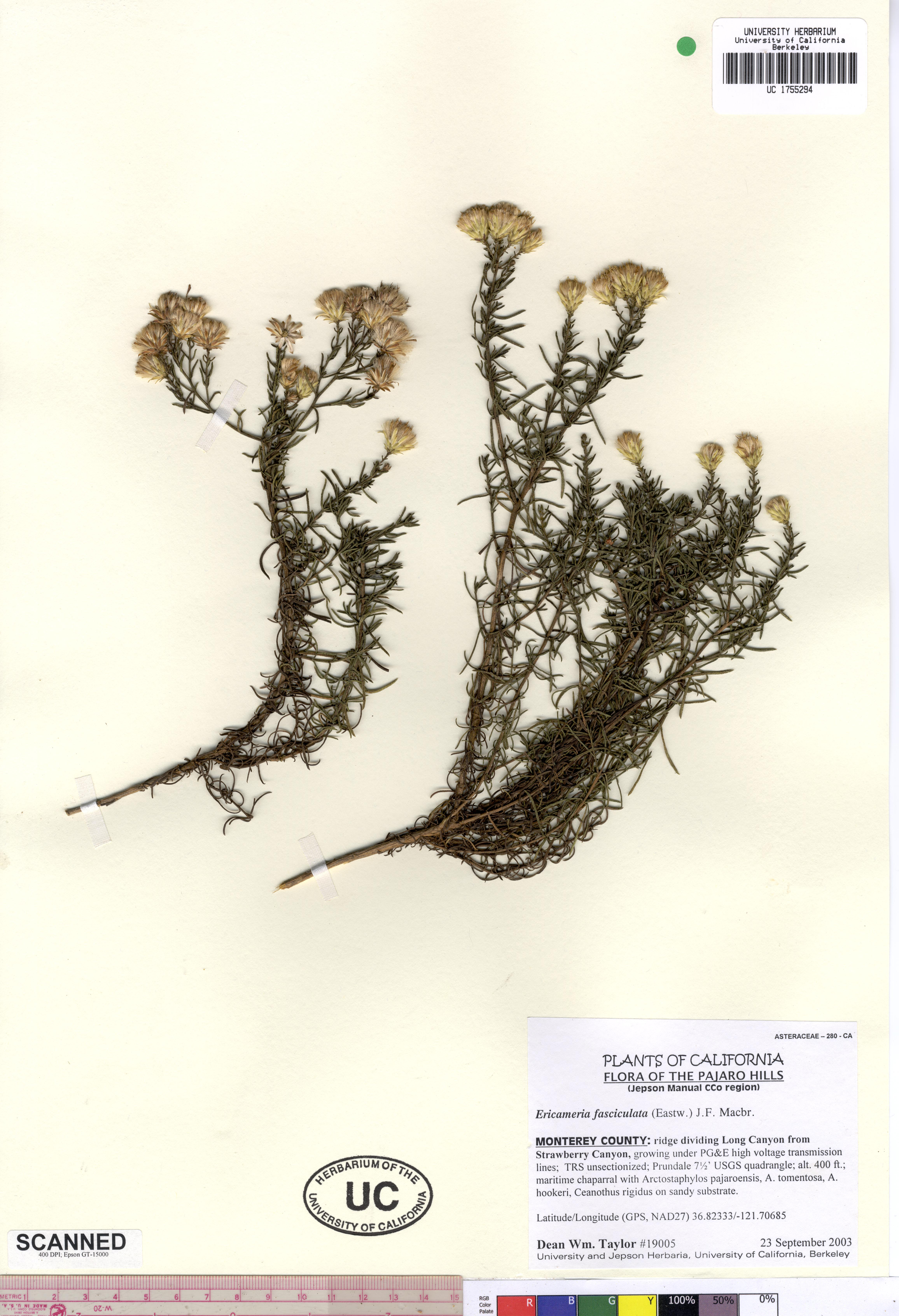
Ericameria fasciculata

Ericameria fasciculata is a rare species of flowering shrub in the family Asteraceae known by the common name Eastwood's goldenbush. It is endemic to northern California, where it is known from fewer than twenty locations. Many sources described it as found only in Monterey County, but the Calflora database maintained by the University of California reports additional collections from nearby Santa Cruz and Santa Clara Counties. These collections are, however, from inhabited regions and might represent either introductions or cultivated specimens.

Ericameria fasciculata grows on sandy soils in chaparral, woodland, and scrub habitat, and sometimes appears in disturbed habitat along roadsides. This is a dense, bushy shrub approaching 50 cm (20 inches) in maximum height, its many glandular branches lined with needlelike leaves 1 to 2 centimeters (0.4-0.8 inches) long. The inflorescence consists of one or more small, cylindrical flower heads lined with yellowish phyllaries. Each head contains many yellow disc florets and sometimes one or two ray florets as well. The fruit is an achene a few millimeters long topped with a brown or white pappus.
