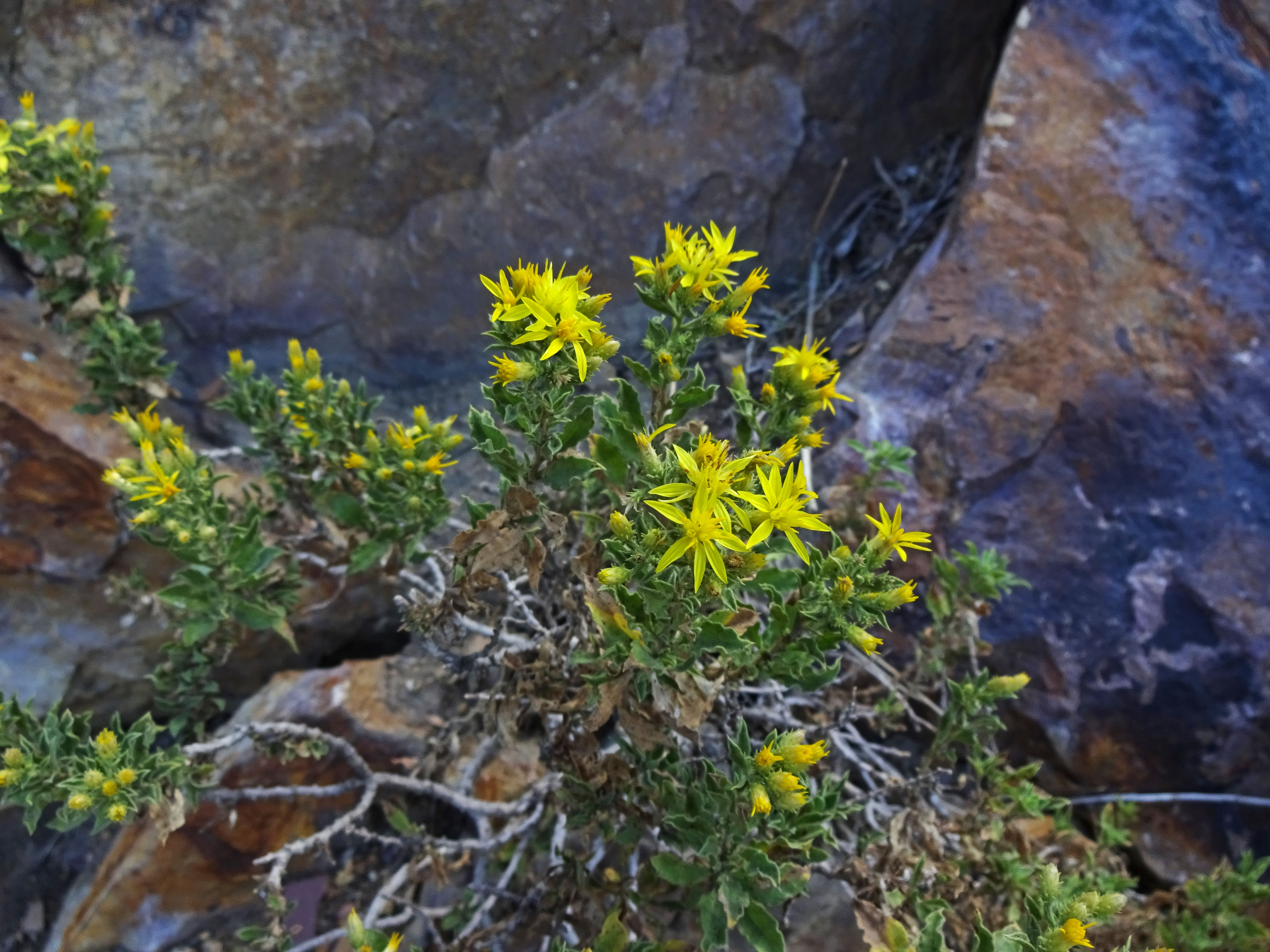

Scientific classification
- Kingdom: Plantae
- Clade: Tracheophytes
- Clade: Angiosperms
- Clade: Eudicots
- Clade: Asterids
- Order: Asterales
- Family: Asteraceae
- Genus: Ericameria
- Species: E. obovata

Binomial name
- Ericameria obovata (Rydb.) G.L.Nesom

Synonyms
- Haplopappus rydbergii S.F.Blake; Aplopappus rydbergii S.F.Blake; Haplopappus watsonii var. rydbergii (S.F.Blake) S.L.Welsh; Macronema obovatum Rydb.

= Ericameria obovata =

Species of flowering plant

Ericameria obovata, or Rydberg's goldenbush, is a North American species of flowering shrubs in the family Asteraceae. It has been found only in the state of Utah in the western United States.

Ericameria obovata is a shrub up to 40 cm (16 inches) tall. It has obovate to spatulate leaves up to 30 mm (1.2 inches) long. Flower heads are yellow, usually in clumps of 2 or 3, each head containing both disc florets and ray florets.
