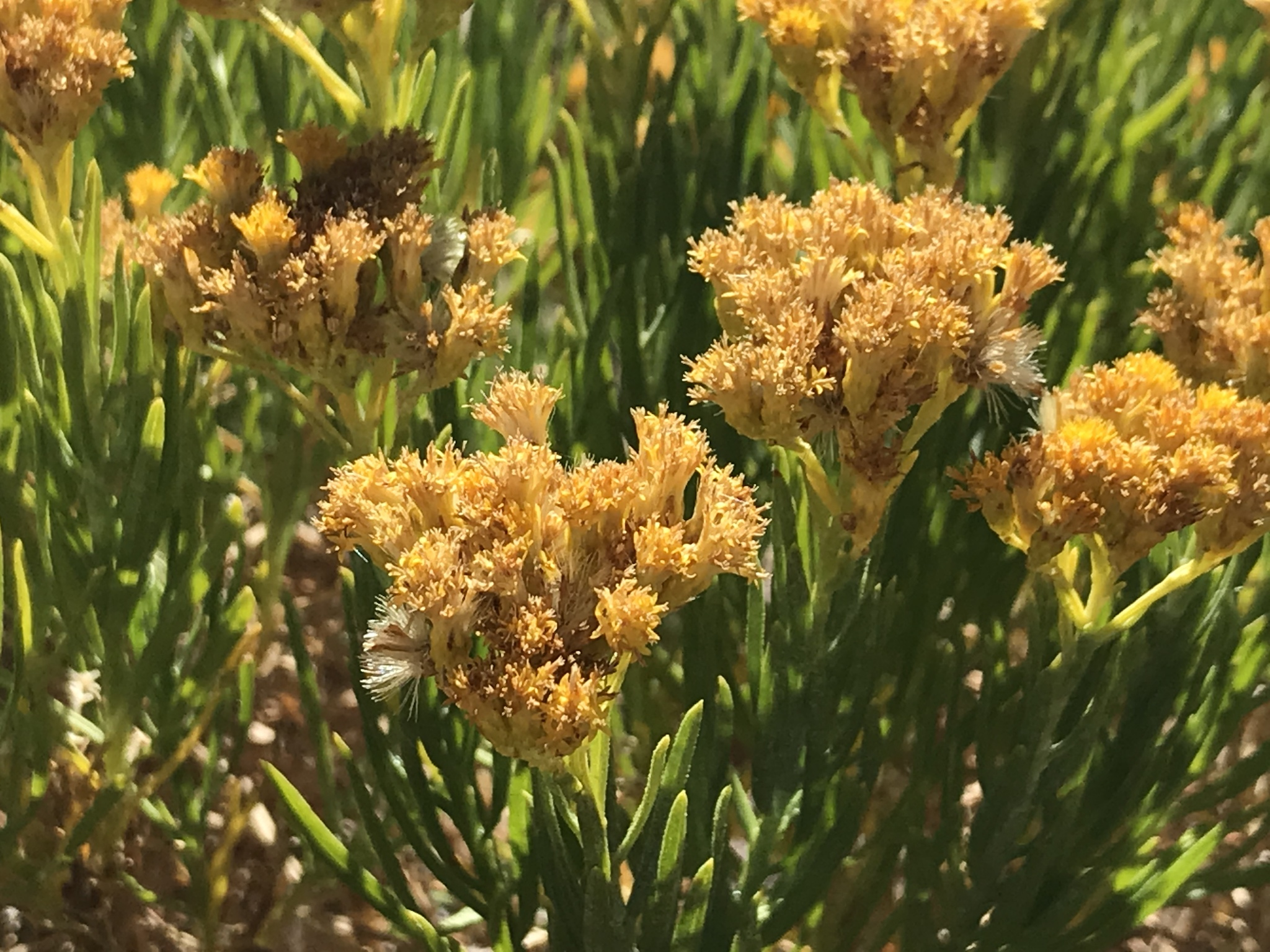
- Ericameria parishii var. peninsularis

Scientific classification
- Kingdom: Plantae
- Clade: Tracheophytes
- Clade: Angiosperms
- Clade: Eudicots
- Clade: Asterids
- Order: Asterales
- Family: Asteraceae
- Genus: Ericameria
- Species: E. parishii

Binomial name
- Ericameria parishii (A.Gray) H.M.Hall

Synonyms
- Aster parishii (Greene) Kuntze; Bigelowia parishii Greene; Bigelovia parishii Greene; Chrysoma parishii (Greene) Greene; Haplopappus parishii (Greene) S.F.Blake; Aplopappus parishii (Greene) S.F.Blake

= Ericameria parishii =

Species of tree

Ericameria parishii, or Parish's rabbitbrush, is a western North American species of flowering plants in the family Asteraceae.

== Distribution ==
The plant is native to southern Southern California in the United States and to the State of Baja California in Mexico. It is found in the San Gabriel Mountains, Verdugo Mountains, eastern Santa Monica Mountains, and San Bernardino Mountains of the Transverse Ranges; and in the Peninsular Ranges.

== Description ==
Ericameria parishii is a shrub or small tree up to 12 feet (3.7 m) tall. It has lance-shaped leaves up to 2 inches (5 cm) long.

One plant can produce many small flower heads, each with up to 12 golden yellow disc florets but no ray florets.

=== Varieties ===
Varieties include:

- Ericameria parishii var. parishii - northern Baja California; California in the mountains from San Diego County north to eastern Ventura County and southwestern San Bernardino County
- Ericameria parishii var. peninsularis (Moran) G.L.Nesom — Peninsular Ranges of northern Baja California state.
