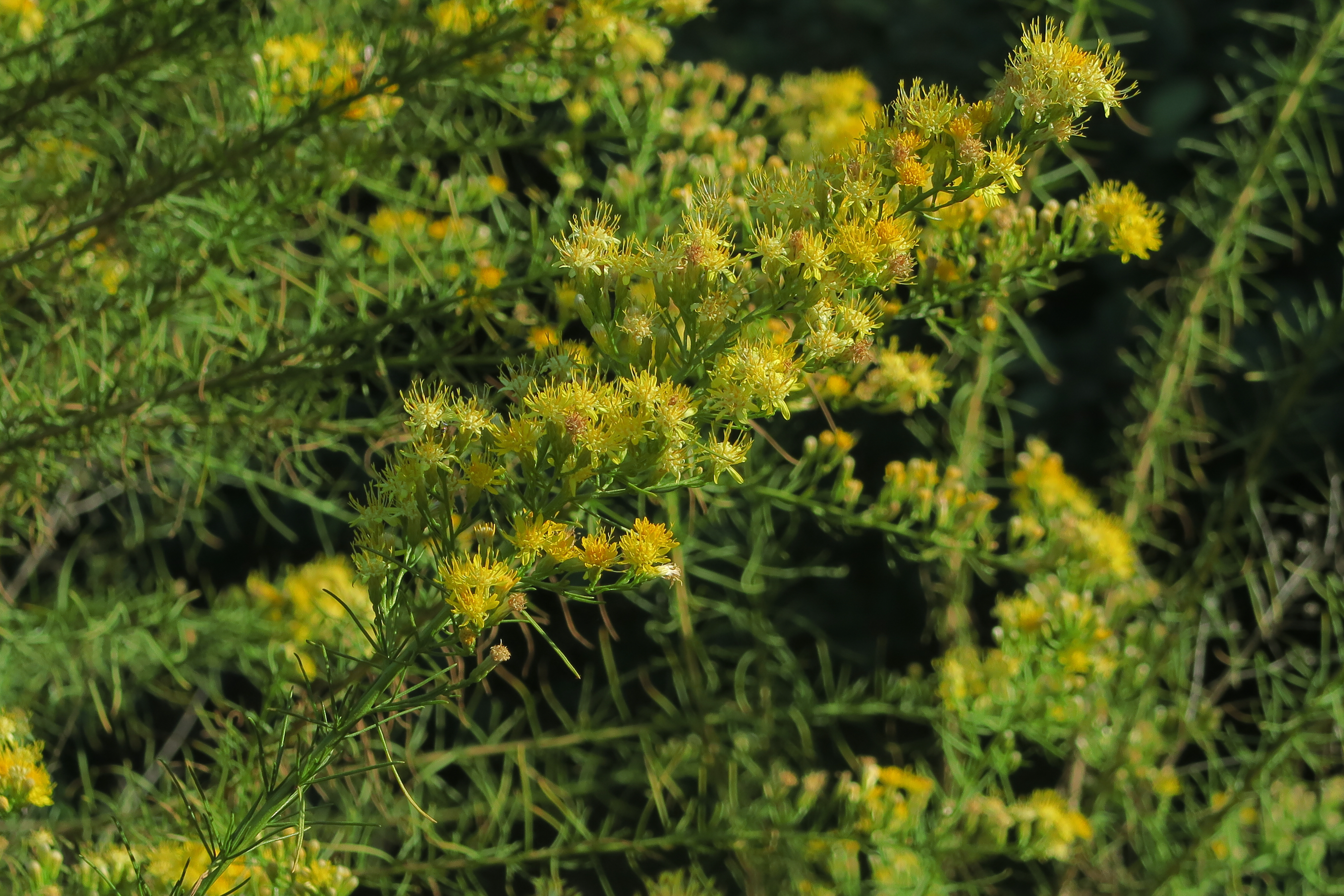

Scientific classification
- Kingdom: Plantae
- Clade: Tracheophytes
- Clade: Angiosperms
- Clade: Eudicots
- Clade: Asterids
- Order: Asterales
- Family: Asteraceae
- Genus: Ericameria
- Species: E. palmeri

Binomial name
- Ericameria palmeri (A.Gray) H.M.Hall

Synonyms
- Aster nevinii Kuntze; Haplopappus palmeri A.Gray; Aplopappus palmeri A.Gray; Chrysoma palmeri (A. Gray) Greene; Haplopappus palmeri var. pachylepis (H.M.Hall) Munz, syn of var. pachylepis; Xylothamia palmeri var. pachylepis (H.M.Hall) G.L.Nesom ex M.A.Lane & R.L.Hartm., syn of var. pachylepis

= Ericameria palmeri =

Species of flowering plant

Ericameria palmeri, or Palmer's goldenbush, is a North American species of flowering shrubs in the family Asteraceae. It is native to southern California in the United States and to the state of Baja California in Mexico.

Ericameria palmeri is a branching shrub sometimes as much as 400 cm (over 13 feet) tall. Leaves are linear to narrowly oblanceolate. One plant can produce many small, yellow flower heads, each containing 2–8 ray florets and 6–20 disc florets.

Varieties

- Ericameria palmeri var. pachylepis (H.M.Hall) G.L.Nesom - California from northern San Diego County north to Kern and San Luis Obispo Counties
- Ericameria palmeri var. palmeri - northern Baja California; California (San Diego Co, Orange Co, western Riverside Co, southwestern San Bernardino Co; isolated populations north of Calabasas in Los Angeles Co and southeast of Lake Isabella in Kern Co)
