= Ericameria lignumviridis =

Scientific classification
- Kingdom: Plantae
- Clade: Tracheophytes
- Clade: Angiosperms
- Clade: Eudicots
- Clade: Asterids
- Order: Asterales
- Family: Asteraceae
- Genus: Ericameria
- Species: E. lignumviridis

Binomial name
- Ericameria lignumviridis (S.L. Welsh) G.L. Nesom

Synonyms
- Haplopappus lignumviridis S.L. Welsh

Species of flowering plant

Ericameria lignumviridis, common name Greenwood's goldenbush or heath-goldenrod, is a plant species endemic to Sevier County, Utah. It grows in riparian areas alongside Urtica dioica, Salix laevigata and other riverbank plants.

Ericameria lignumviridis is a shrub up to 30 cm (12 inches) tall, with branching stems. Leaves are oblanceolate, up to 30 mm (1.2 inches) long. Flower heads are arranged in cymous fashion. Ray flowers and disc flowers are both yellow.
