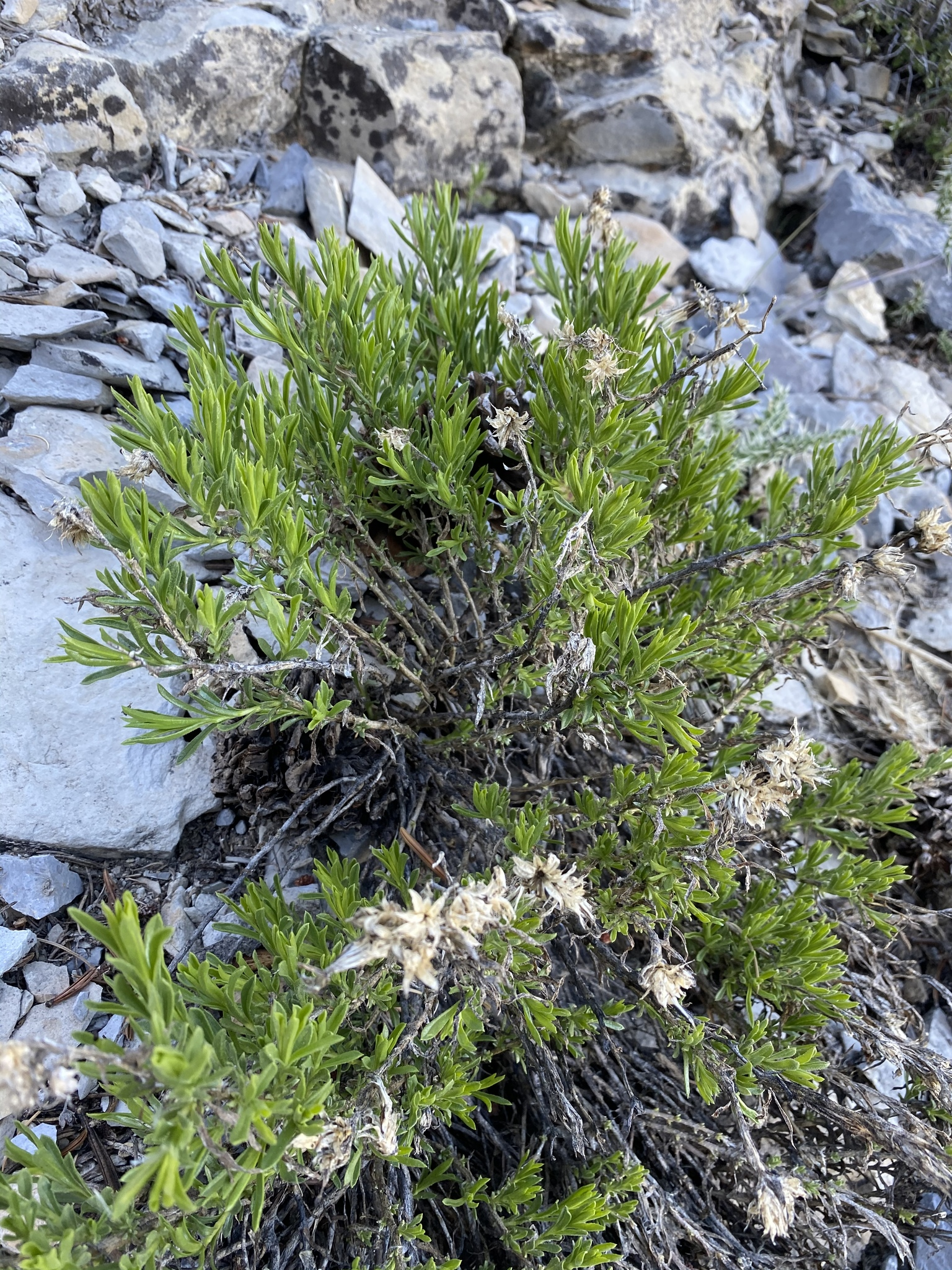

Scientific classification
- Kingdom: Plantae
- Clade: Tracheophytes
- Clade: Angiosperms
- Clade: Eudicots
- Clade: Asterids
- Order: Asterales
- Family: Asteraceae
- Genus: Ericameria
- Species: E. compacta

Binomial name
- Ericameria compacta (H.M.Hall) G.L.Nesom

Synonyms
- Haplopappus bloomeri subsp. compactus H.M.Hall; Haplopappus bloomeri var. compactus (H.M.Hall) S.F.Blake; Aplopappus bloomeri var. compactus (H.M.Hall) S.F.Blake; Haplopappus compactus (H.M.Hall) L.C.Anderson

= Ericameria compacta =

Species of flowering plant

Ericameria compacta, the Charleston Mountain goldenbush, is a rare North American species of flowering plants in the family Asteraceae. It has been found only in pine forests in the Spring and Sheep Mountains of Clark County, Nevada. Fewer than 12 populations have been found.

Ericameria compacta is a branching shrub up to 50 cm (20 inches) tall. Leaves are oblanceolate to narrowly spatulate, up to 4 cm (1.6 inches) long. One plant can form many small, yellow flower heads, each with as many as 16 disc florets but no ray florets.
