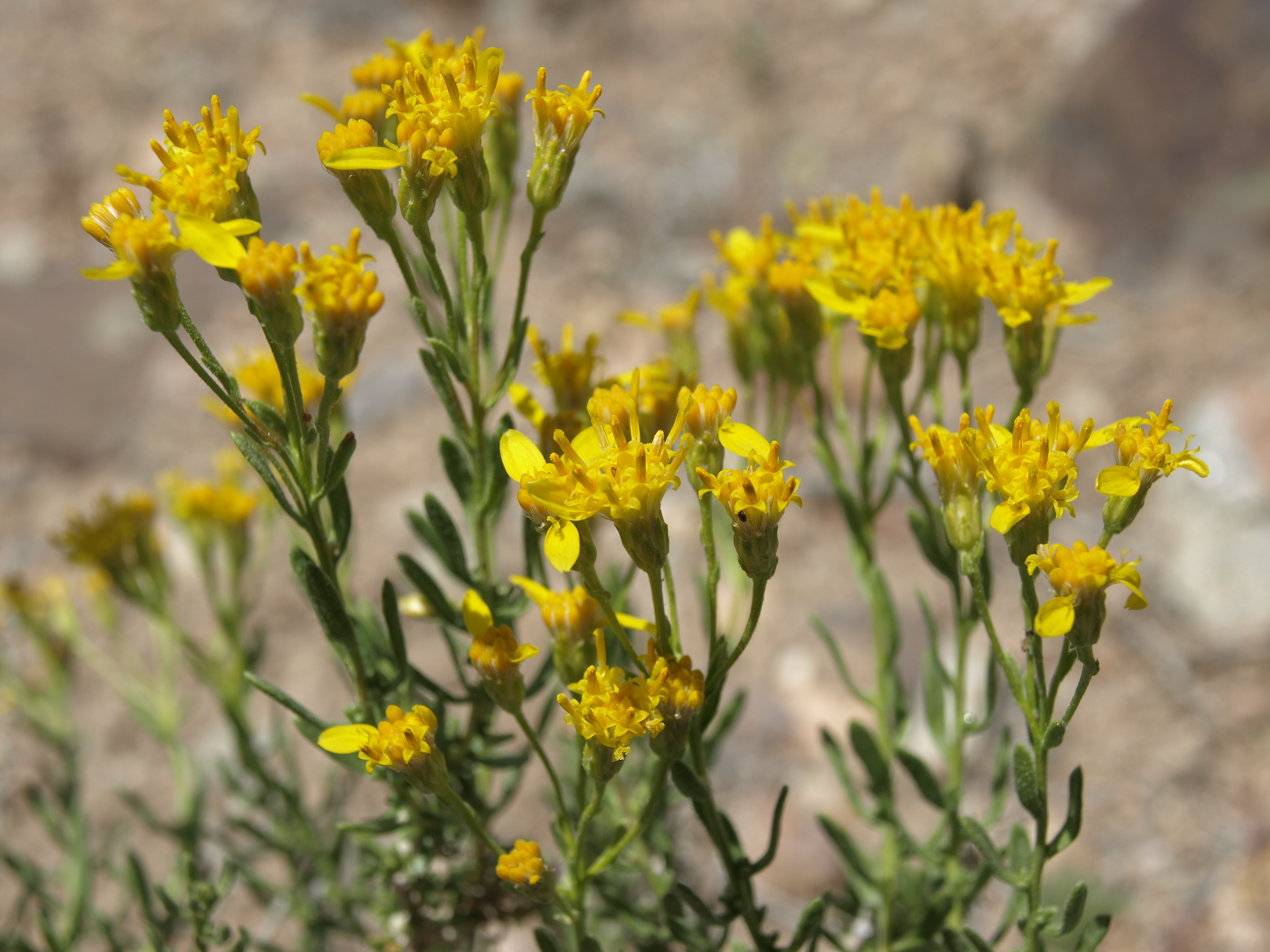

Scientific classification
- Kingdom: Plantae
- Clade: Tracheophytes
- Clade: Angiosperms
- Clade: Eudicots
- Clade: Asterids
- Order: Asterales
- Family: Asteraceae
- Genus: Ericameria
- Species: E. cooperi

Binomial name
- Ericameria cooperi (A.Gray) H.M.Hall

Synonyms
- Aster cooperi (A.Gray) Kuntze; Aster monactis (A.Gray) Kuntze; Bigelowia cooperi A.Gray; Bigelovia cooperi A.Gray; Chrysoma cooperi (A.Gray) Greene; Ericameria monactis (A.Gray) McClatchie; Haplopappus cooperi (A.Gray) H.M.Hall; Haplopappus monactis A.Gray

= Ericameria cooperi =

Species of flowering plant

Ericameria cooperi, or Cooper's goldenbush, is a North American species of shrubs that grows in the desert regions of southern Nevada, southern and eastern California, and Baja California. It is in the goldenbush genus in the (sunflower family).

Ericameria cooperi is a shrub. Leaves are long and narrow, sometimes thread-like, without hairs. One plant can produce several flower heads in a flat-topped array, each head containing 6-7 disc florets but no ray florets.

Varieties

- Ericameria cooperi var. bajacalifornica (Urbatsch & Wussow) Urbatsch - Baja California
- Ericameria cooperi var. cooperi - Baja California, California, Nevada
