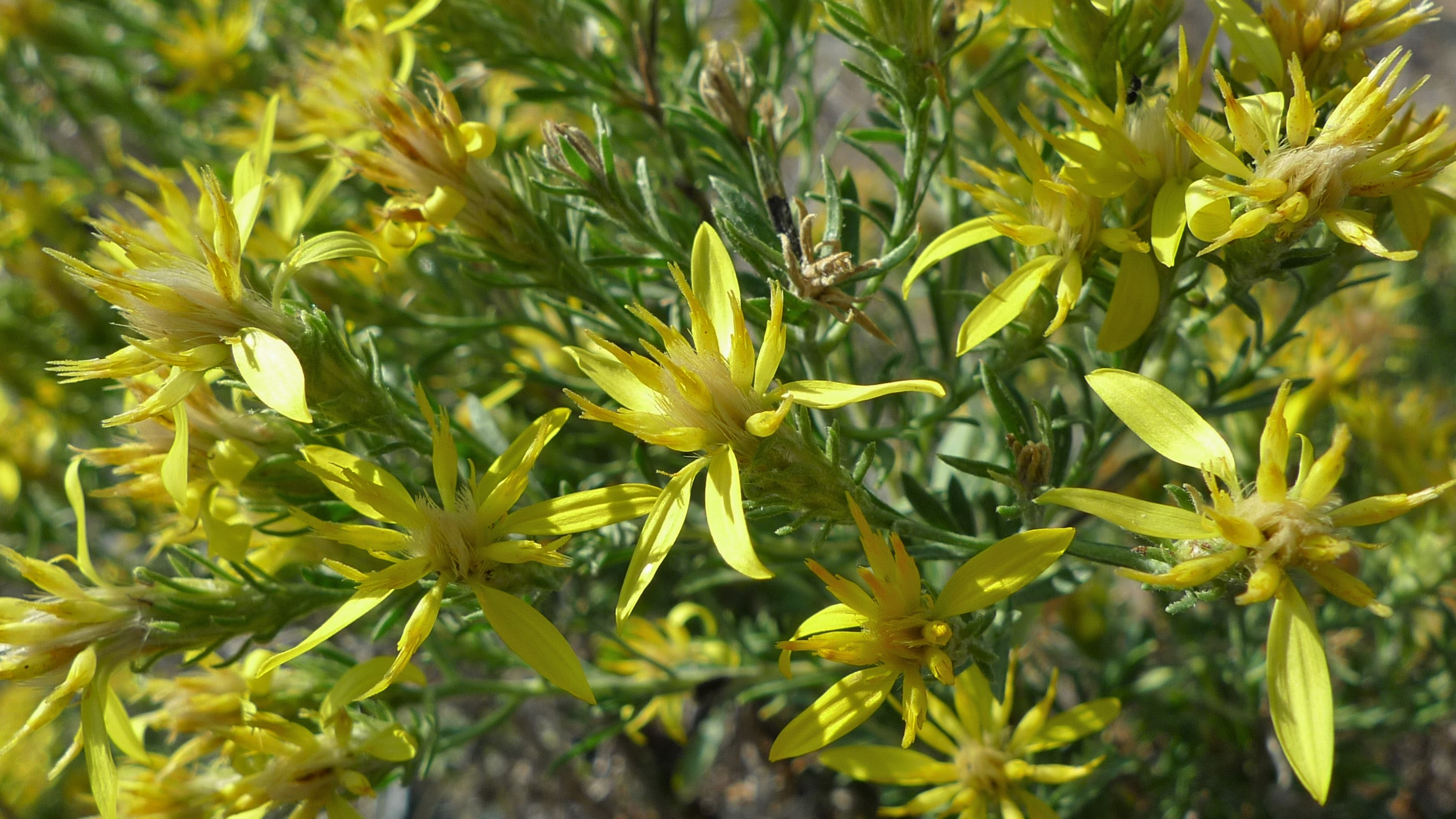

Scientific classification
- Kingdom: Plantae
- Clade: Tracheophytes
- Clade: Angiosperms
- Clade: Eudicots
- Clade: Asterids
- Order: Asterales
- Family: Asteraceae
- Genus: Ericameria
- Species: E. greenei

Binomial name
- Ericameria greenei (Gray) G.L.Nesom

Synonyms
- Aster greenei (A.Gray) Kuntze; Haplopappus greenei A.Gray; Haplopappus mollis A.Gray; Aplopappus greenei A.Gray; Aplopappus mollis A.Gray; Macronema greenei (A.Gray) Greene; Macronema molle (A.Gray) Greene

= Ericameria greenei =

Species of flowering plant

Ericameria greenei is a species of flowering shrub in the family Asteraceae known by the common name Greene's goldenbush. It is native to the mountains of the western United States in Washington, Idaho, Oregon, and the northern California as far south as Lake and Tuolumne Counties.

Ericameria greenei grows in rocky and open wooded habitat. It is a small shrub growing up to about 25 centimeters (10 inches) tall with branches lined with short, narrow, hairless to glandular, woolly leaves. The inflorescence is a cluster of flower heads at the tips of stem branches. Each head is lined with sticky, glandular phyllaries and contains as many as 20 yellowish disc florets and sometimes a few yellow ray florets but sometimes none. The fruit is an achene topped with a brownish pappus.
