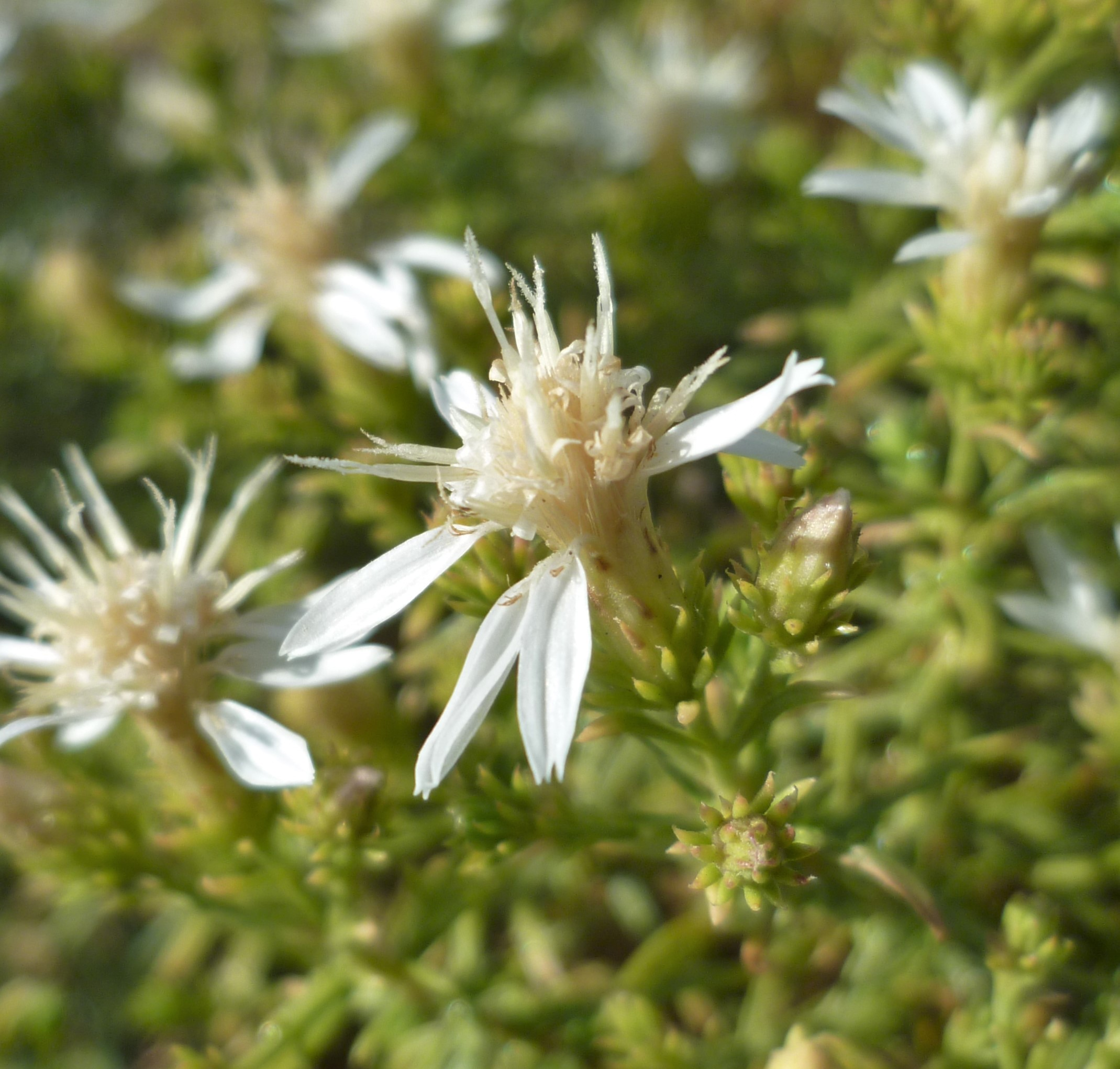

Scientific classification
- Kingdom: Plantae
- Clade: Tracheophytes
- Clade: Angiosperms
- Clade: Eudicots
- Clade: Asterids
- Order: Asterales
- Family: Asteraceae
- Genus: Ericameria
- Species: E. resinosa

Binomial name
- Ericameria resinosa Nutt.

Synonyms
- Chrysothamnus resinosus (Nutt.) Howell; Haplopappus resinosus (Nutt.) A.Gray; Aplopappus resinosus (Nutt.) A.Gray

= Ericameria resinosa =

Species of flowering plant

Ericameria resinosa, the Columbia goldenweed, or Columbia goldenbush, is a North American species of flowering shrubs in the family Asteraceae. It is native to the northwestern part of the United States, in the states of Washington, Oregon, and Idaho.

Ericameria resinosa is a shrub up to 50 cm (20 inches) tall. It has leathery thread-like or narrowly oblanceolate leaves up to 25 mm (1 inch) long, with resinous glands on the surface. The flowers form at the tips of branches and are surrounded by a denser cluster of reduced leaves. Flower heads are white, with 10–15 disc florets and 0–7 ray florets. Its habitats include rocky plains, steep hillsides, and rocky cliffs, usually rooted in rock crevices.

== Gallery ==
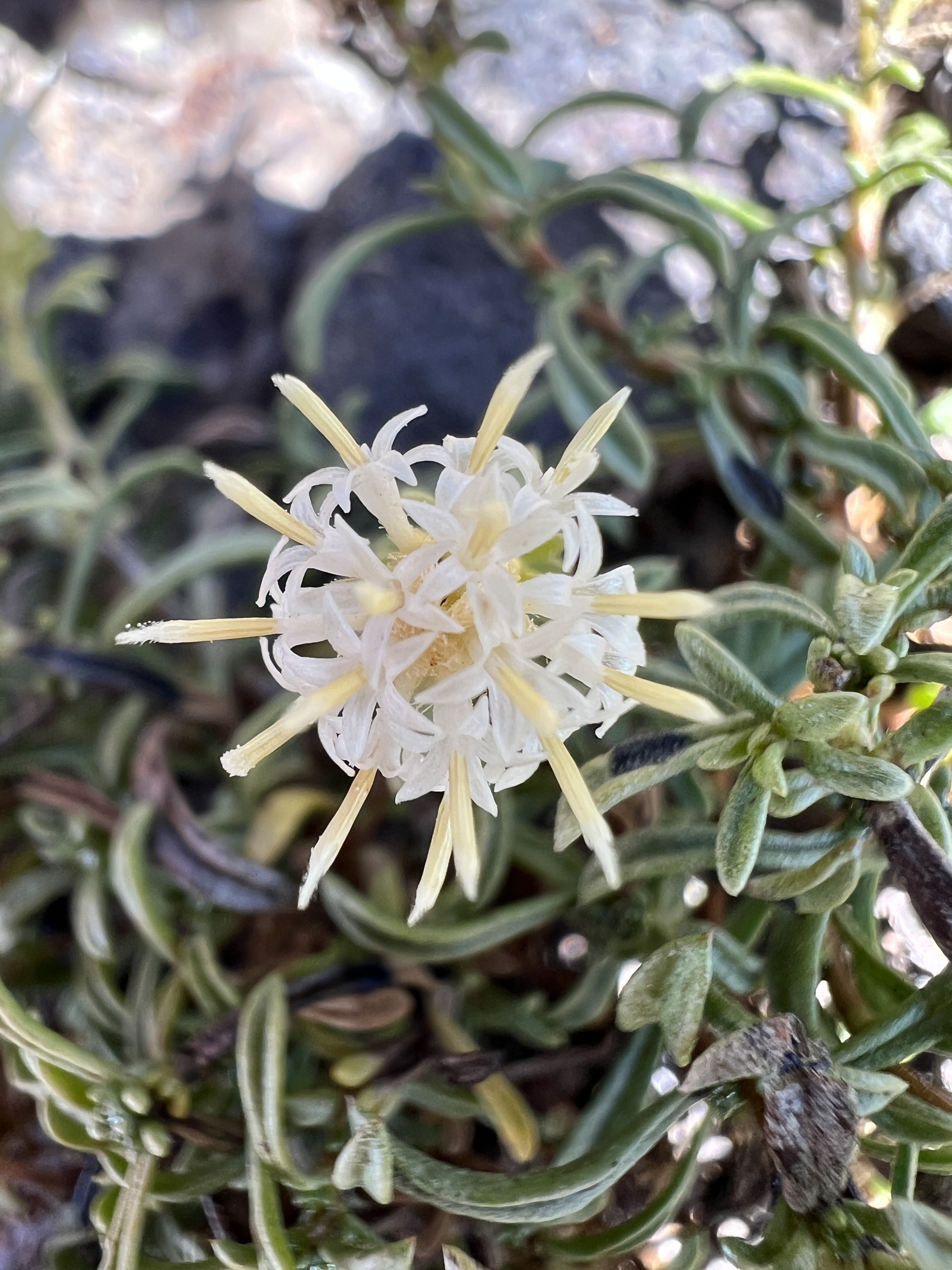
rayless flower

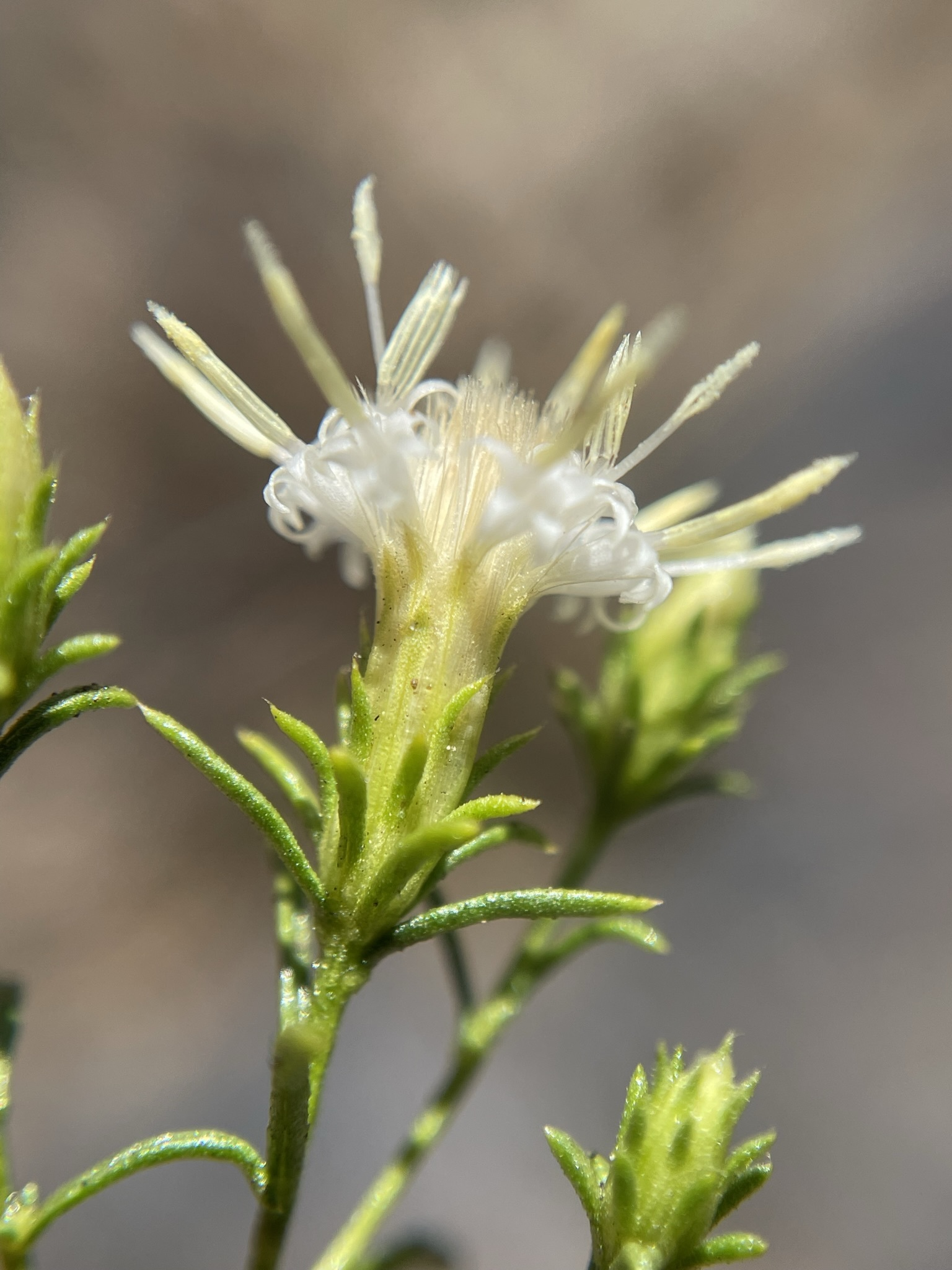
rayless flower side view

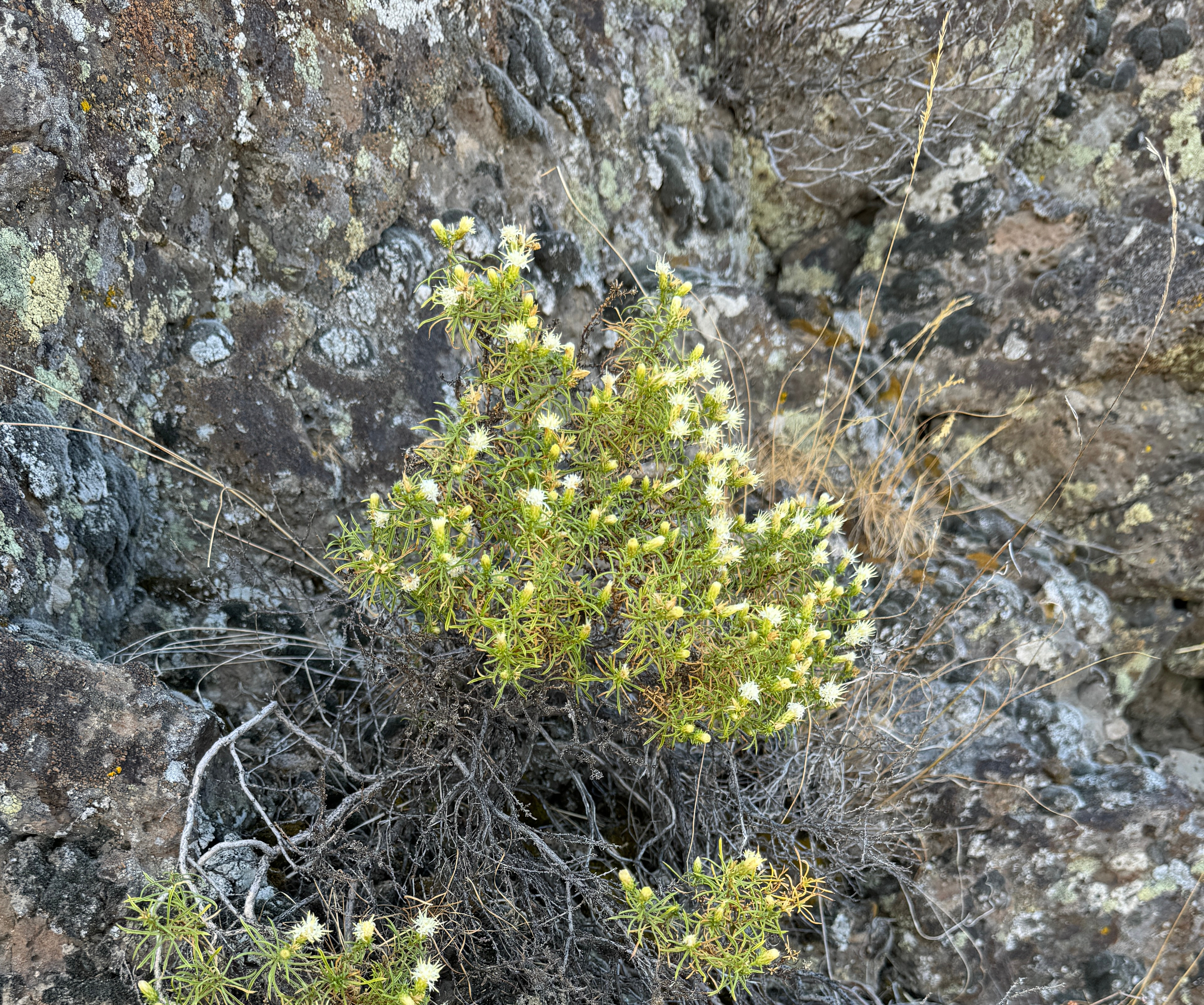
Growing on rock bluff
