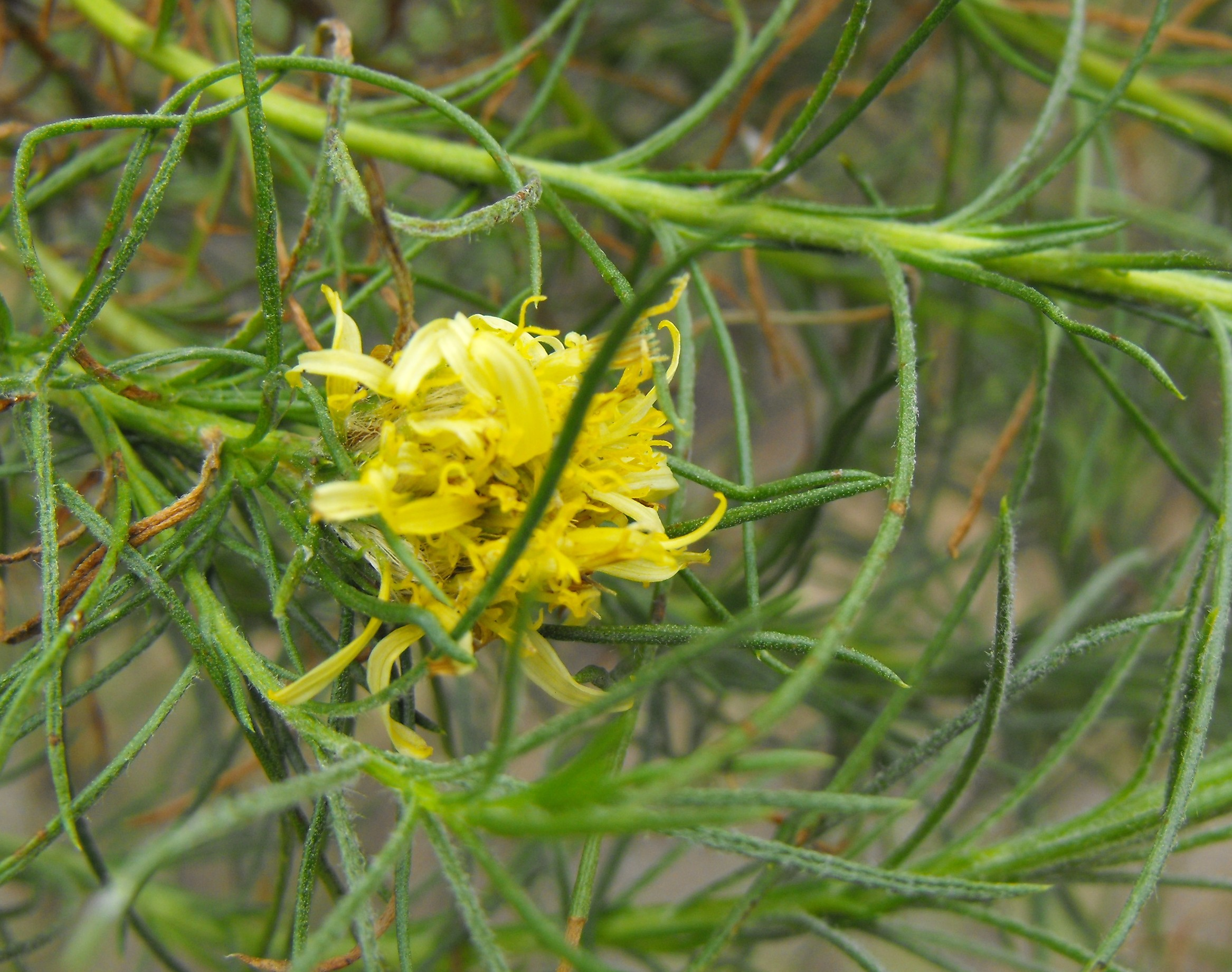

Conservation status
- Imperiled (NatureServe)

Scientific classification
- Kingdom: Plantae
- Clade: Tracheophytes
- Clade: Angiosperms
- Clade: Eudicots
- Clade: Asterids
- Order: Asterales
- Family: Asteraceae
- Genus: Ericameria
- Species: E. pinifolia

Binomial name
- Ericameria pinifolia (Gray) H.M. Hall

Synonyms
- Aster pityphyllus Kuntze; Chrysoma pinifolia (A.Gray) Greene; Haplopappus pinifolius A.Gray; Aplopappus pinifolius A.Gray

= Ericameria pinifolia =

Species of flowering plant

Ericameria pinifolia is a species of flowering shrubs in the family Asteraceae known by the common name pinebush. This plant is native to southern California and northern Baja California.

Ericameria pinifolia is found in scrub and chaparral from the inland Peninsular and western Transverse Ranges foothills to the Colorado Desert. It is a green, hairless shrub sometimes as much as 300 cm (10 feet) tall. It is covered in clustered needle-like leaves each 1-4 centimeters (0.4-1.6 inches) long which at first glance look like very young pine needles. The leaves are fleshier than true needles and the plant is not closely related to the pines.

Atop each of the many erect branches is an inflorescence of small whitish flower heads. The plant blooms twice per year, producing single-head inflorescences in the spring and inflorescences with many smaller heads in the fall. Each head contains 3–10 ray florets and 11–25 disc florets. The fruit is an achene with a bright white, red, or tan pappus.
