= Ericameria winwardii =

Scientific classification
- Kingdom: Plantae
- Clade: Tracheophytes
- Clade: Angiosperms
- Clade: Eudicots
- Clade: Asterids
- Order: Asterales
- Family: Asteraceae
- Genus: Ericameria
- Species: E. winwardii

Binomial name
- Ericameria winwardii (Dorn & Delmatier) R.P.Roberts & Urbatsch

Synonyms
- Ericameria discoidea var. winwardii Dorn & Delmatier

Species of flowering plant

Ericameria winwardii is a rare North American species of flowering plants in the family Asteraceae. It has been found only on in two adjacent counties in the western United States: Lincoln County in Wyoming and Bear Lake County in Idaho.

Ericameria winwardii is a branching shrub up to 20 cm (8 inches) tall. Leaves are elliptic or oblanceolate up to 15 mm (0.6 inches) long. It sometimes produces flower heads one at a time, sometimes in groups, each head with 4–9 disc florets but no ray florets.
