= Bucculatrix ericameriae =

Scientific classification
- Kingdom: Animalia
- Phylum: Arthropoda
- Clade: Pancrustacea
- Class: Insecta
- Order: Lepidoptera
- Family: Bucculatricidae
- Genus: Bucculatrix
- Species: B. ericameriae

Binomial name
- Bucculatrix ericameriae Braun, 1963

Species of moth

Bucculatrix ericameriae is a moth in the family Bucculatricidae. It is found in North America, where it has been recorded from California. It was first described by Annette Frances Braun in 1963. Adults have been recorded on wing in March.

The larvae feed on Ericameria arborescens.
