= Ericameria arizonica =

Scientific classification
- Kingdom: Plantae
- Clade: Tracheophytes
- Clade: Angiosperms
- Clade: Eudicots
- Clade: Asterids
- Order: Asterales
- Family: Asteraceae
- Genus: Ericameria
- Species: E. arizonica

Binomial name
- Ericameria arizonica R.P.Roberts, Urbatsch & J.L.Anderson

Species of flowering plant

Ericameria arizonica is a North American species of flowering shrub in the family Asteraceae known as Arizona goldenbush or Grand Canyon goldenweed. It has been found only on the cliffs on the south rim of the Grand Canyon in Coconino County, Arizona.

Ericameria arizonica is a shrub up to 50 cm (20 inches) tall. It has elliptic to narrowly oblanceolate leaves up to 35 mm (1.4 inches) long. Flower heads are in flat-topped arrays, each with both disc florets and ray florets. The species was described in 2005 by Roland P. Roberts, Lowell E. Urbatsch and John Anderson. Ericameria arizonica is ranked as G2 (Imperiled) by NatureServe.
