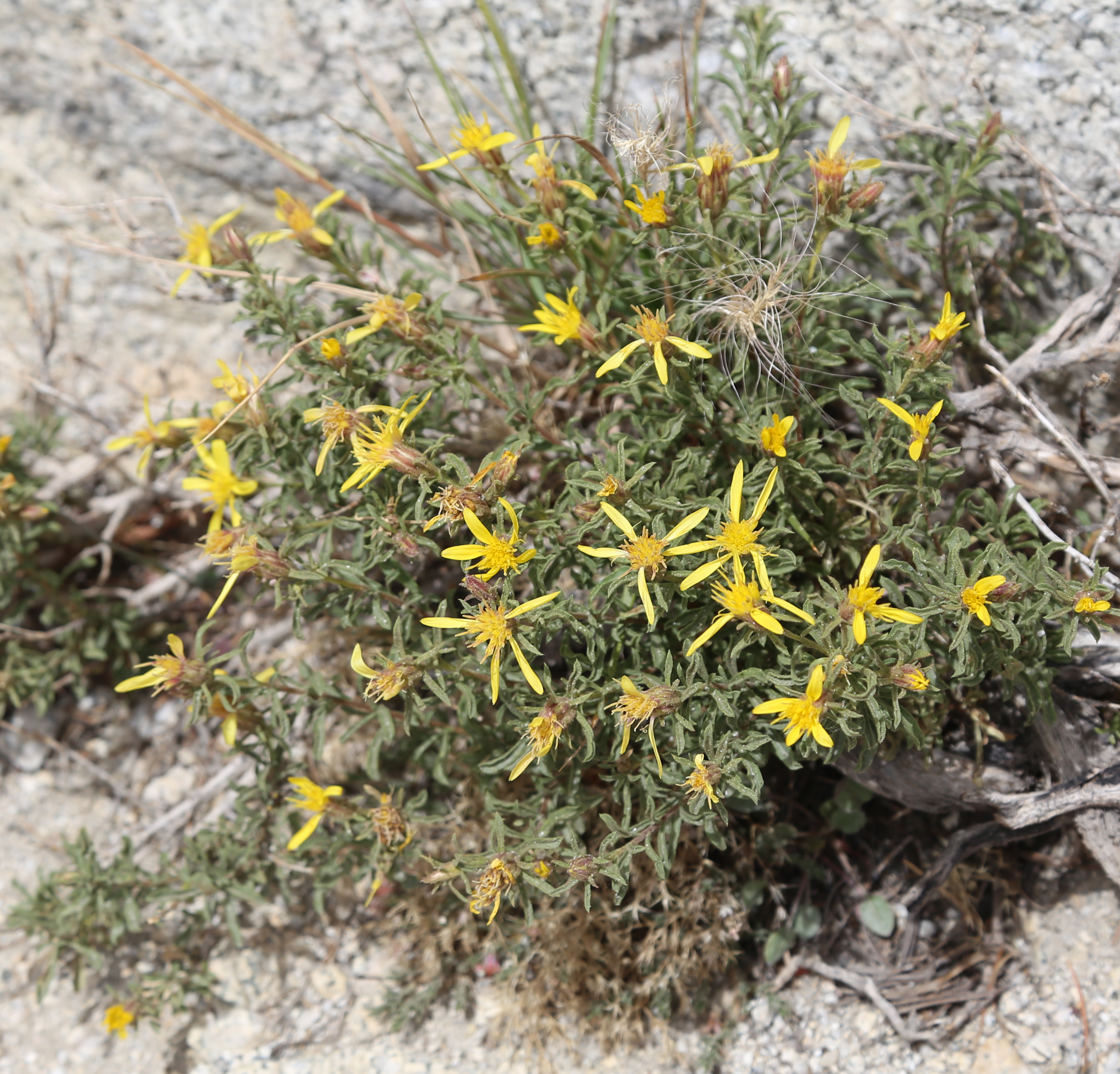

Scientific classification
- Kingdom: Plantae
- Clade: Tracheophytes
- Clade: Angiosperms
- Clade: Eudicots
- Clade: Asterids
- Order: Asterales
- Family: Asteraceae
- Genus: Ericameria
- Species: E. suffruticosa

Binomial name
- Ericameria suffruticosa (Nutt.) G.L.Nesom

Synonyms
- Aster suffruticosus (Nutt.) Kuntze; Haplopappus suffruticosus (Nutt.) A.Gray; Aplopappus suffruticosus (Nutt.) A.Gray; Macronema suffruticosa Nutt.

= Ericameria suffruticosa =

Species of flowering plant

Ericameria suffruticosa, the singlehead goldenbush, is a subshrub to shrub in the family Asteraceae found in the western United States (California, Nevada, Oregon, Idaho, Nevada, Wyoming, Montana). "Suffruticosa" means "shrublike".

== Description ==
Ericameria suffruticosa is a subshrub to shrub 6 to 16 inches (15 to 41 cm) tall. It has sticky, small, gray-green leaves that are wavy at the edges and highly aromatic when crushed. One plant can produce several yellow flower heads with irregular structure, having its few disk flowers pointing in all directions, and 1-6 ray flowers haphazardly placed around the disk. The species grows from 8,000 to 12,000 feet (2,400 to 3,700 m) in elevation on rocky flats, ledges, and exposed ridges in mountain and alpine plant communities.
