= Ericameria juarezensis =

Scientific classification
- Kingdom: Plantae
- Clade: Tracheophytes
- Clade: Angiosperms
- Clade: Eudicots
- Clade: Asterids
- Order: Asterales
- Family: Asteraceae
- Genus: Ericameria
- Species: E. juarezensis

Binomial name
- Ericameria juarezensis (Moran) Urbatsch

Synonyms
- Haplopappus juarezensis Moran

Species of flowering plant

Ericameria juarezensis is a plant species in the family Asteraceae, found only in the mountains of northern Baja California.

Ericameria juarezensis is a branching shrub up to 60 cm (2 feet) tall and 120 cm (4 feet) across. Stems can be as much as 3 cm (1.2 inches) in diameter at the base, with gray-brown, shedding bark. Leaves are obovate or oblanceolate, with no teeth on the edges. Flower heads are yellow, sometimes with as many as 26 disc florets but no ray florets.
