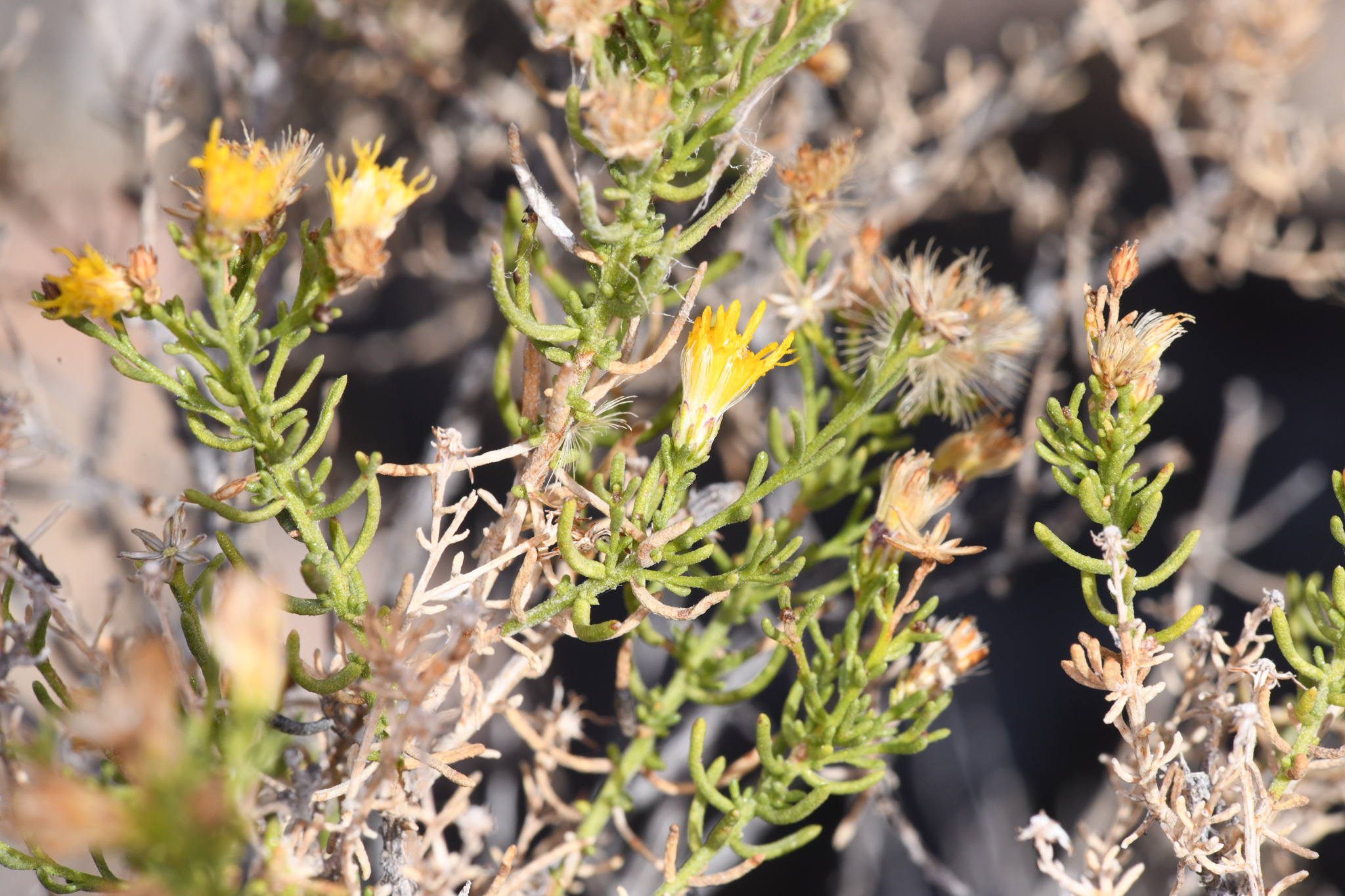

Conservation status
- Apparently Secure (NatureServe)

Scientific classification
- Kingdom: Plantae
- Clade: Tracheophytes
- Clade: Angiosperms
- Clade: Eudicots
- Clade: Asterids
- Order: Asterales
- Family: Asteraceae
- Genus: Ericameria
- Species: E. brachylepis

Binomial name
- Ericameria brachylepis (A.Gray) H.M.Hall

Synonyms
- Aster brachylepis (A.Gray) Kuntze; Bigelowia brachylepis A.Gray; Chrysoma brachylepis (A.Gray) Greene; Haplopappus brachylepis (A.Gray) H.M.Hall 1919 not Phil. 1895; Haplopappus propinquus (A.Gray) S.F.Blake

= Ericameria brachylepis =

Species of flowering plant

Ericameria brachylepis is a North American species of flowering shrub in the family Asteraceae known by the common names chaparral goldenbush and boundary goldenbush.

It is native to Arizona, southern California and northern Baja California where it is a member of the chaparral plant community.

== Description ==
Ericameria brachylepis is a bushy shrub growing 100–200 cm (40-80 inches) high with branches covered in thready leaves up to 2.5 centimeters (1.0 inch) long.

The inflorescence is a cluster of flower heads, each head lined with phyllaries and resin glands. The flower head contains several yellow disc florets and no ray florets. The fruit is a small achene topped with a white pappus.
