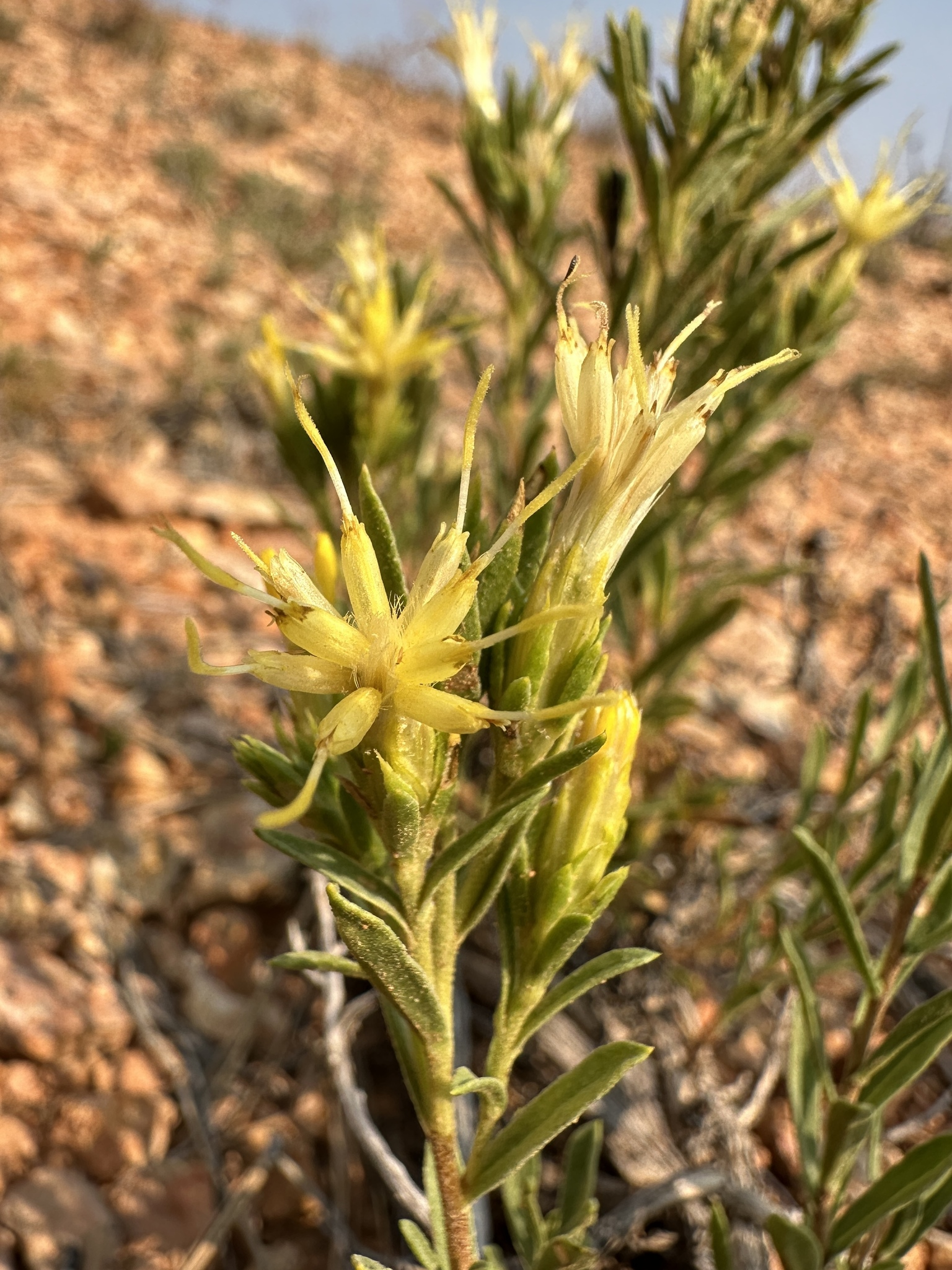

Scientific classification
- Kingdom: Plantae
- Clade: Tracheophytes
- Clade: Angiosperms
- Clade: Eudicots
- Clade: Asterids
- Order: Asterales
- Family: Asteraceae
- Genus: Ericameria
- Species: E. zionis

Binomial name
- Ericameria zionis (L.C.Anderson) G.L.Nesom

Synonyms
- Haplopappus zionis L.C.Anderson

= Ericameria zionis =

Species of flowering plant

Ericameria zionis, the subalpine goldenbush or cedar breaks goldenbush, is a rare North American species of flowering plants in the family Asteraceae. It has been found only at high elevations in the mountains in the southern part of the state of Utah in the western United States. Some of the populations lie inside Cedar Breaks National Monument and Bryce Canyon National Park.

Ericameria zionis is a branching shrub up to 30 cm (12 inches) tall. Leaves are spatula-shaped, up to 40 mm (1.6 inches) long. One plant can produce many small white flower heads in a tightly packed clump, each head with as many as 21 disc florets but no ray florets.
