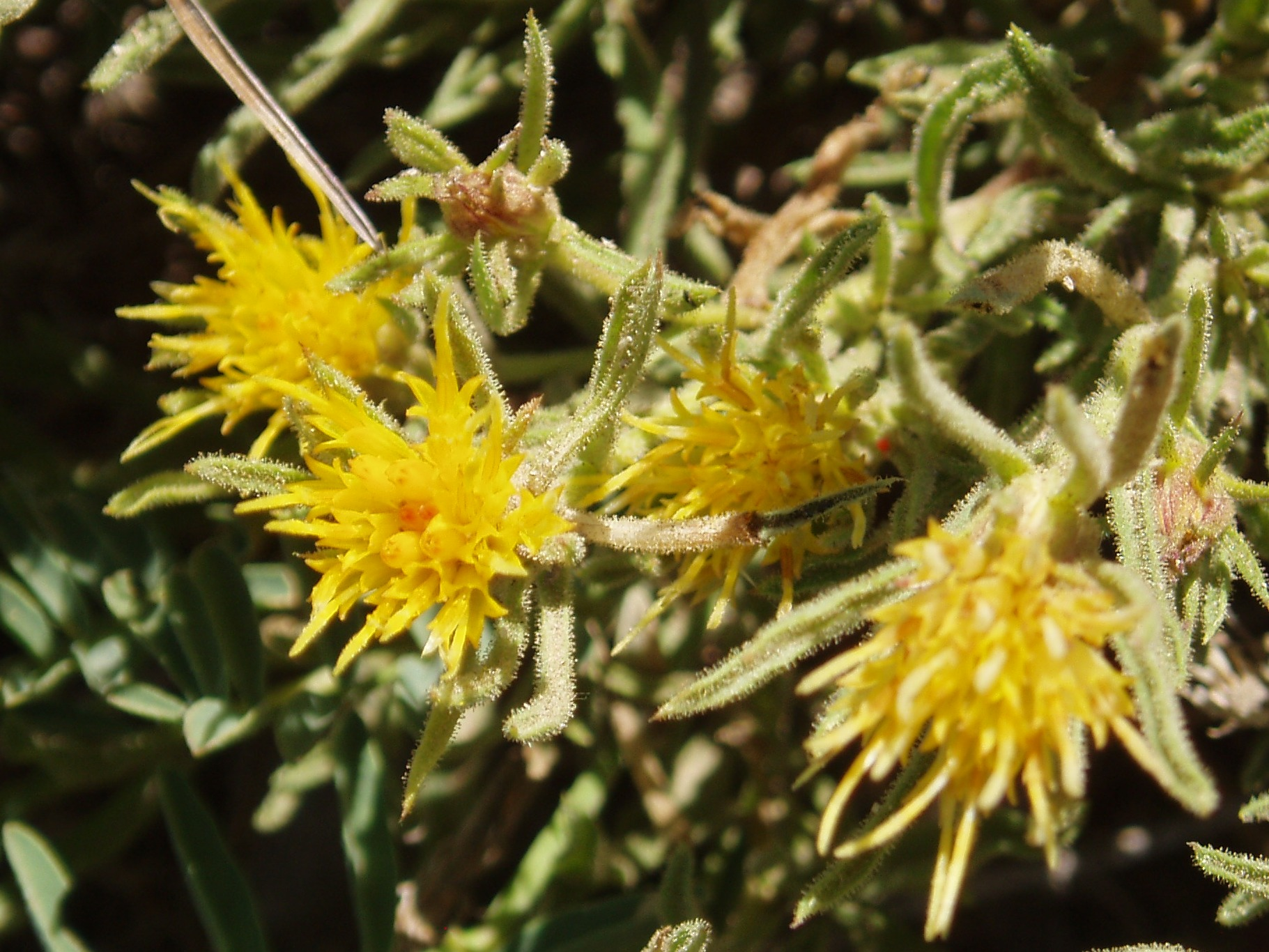

Conservation status
- Apparently Secure (NatureServe)

Scientific classification
- Kingdom: Plantae
- Clade: Tracheophytes
- Clade: Angiosperms
- Clade: Eudicots
- Clade: Asterids
- Order: Asterales
- Family: Asteraceae
- Genus: Ericameria
- Species: E. discoidea

Binomial name
- Ericameria discoidea (Nutt.) G.L.Nesom

Synonyms
- Aster macronema (A.Gray) Kuntze; Bigelowia macronema (A.Gray) M.E.Jones; Haplopappus macronema (Nutt.) A.Gray; Macronema discoidea Nutt.

= Ericameria discoidea =

Species of flowering plant

Ericameria discoidea, commonly known as whitestem goldenbush or sharp-scale goldenweed is a species of flowering shrub in the family Asteraceae. This plant is native to the western United States from California, Oregon, Nevada, Utah, Colorado, Idaho, and Montana.

Ericameria discoidea grows in clumpy thickets on rocky slopes. It is a small shrub reaching a maximum height of 40 centimeters (16 inches). It has many erect branches covered in a foliage of oval-shaped leaves coated in dense white woolly fibers and tiny stalked resin glands. Atop each short branch is an inflorescence of many flower heads, each packed with sometimes as many as 70 disc florets that bloom in golden yellow and wilt to a rusty orange. There are no ray florets.
