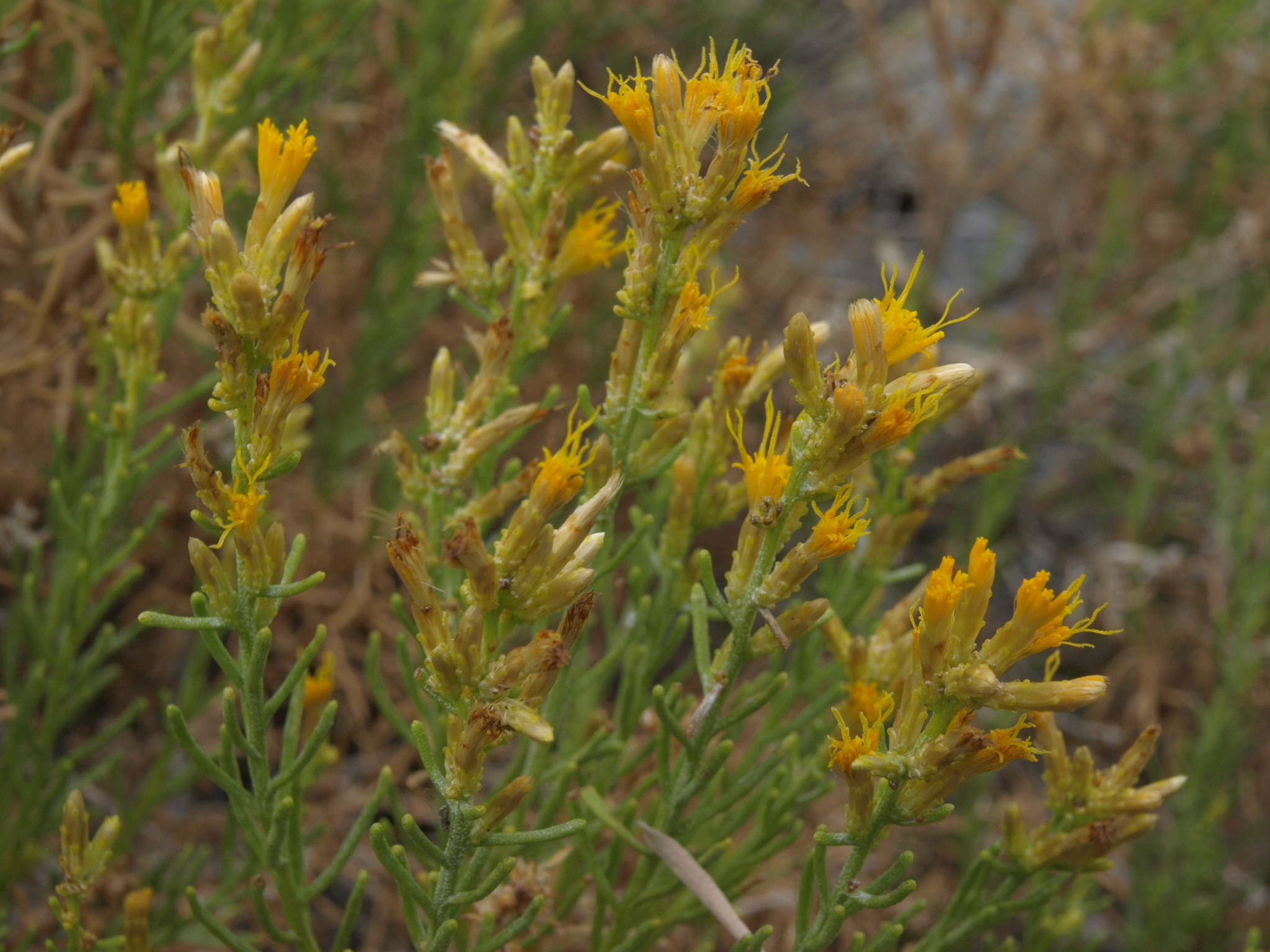

Scientific classification
- Kingdom: Plantae
- Clade: Tracheophytes
- Clade: Angiosperms
- Clade: Eudicots
- Clade: Asterids
- Order: Asterales
- Family: Asteraceae
- Genus: Ericameria
- Species: E. teretifolia

Binomial name
- Ericameria teretifolia (Durand & Hilg.) Jeps.

Synonyms
- Aster durandii Kuntze 1891 not Nutt. ex Durand 1854; Bigelowia teretifolia (Durand & Hilg.) A.Gray; Bigelovia teretifolia (Durand & Hilg.) A.Gray; Chrysoma teretifolia Greene; Chrysothamnus teretifolius (Durand & Hilg.) H.M.Hall; Linosyris teretifolia Durand & Hilg.

= Ericameria teretifolia =

Species of flowering plant

Ericameria teretifolia, known by the common name green rabbitbrush, is a North American species of flowering plants in the family Asteraceae. It is native to southern and eastern California, southern Nevada, and northwestern Arizona in the southwestern United States.

Ericameria teretifolia is a shrub up to 150 cm (5 feet) tall. Leaves are thread-shaped and terete (round in cross-section, very gradually tapering; the epithet teretifolia means "with terete leaves"). One plant can produce many small yellow flower heads each with 5-7 disc florets but no ray florets. The plant grows in desert regions, in flat plains, rocky slopes, and canyon walls.
