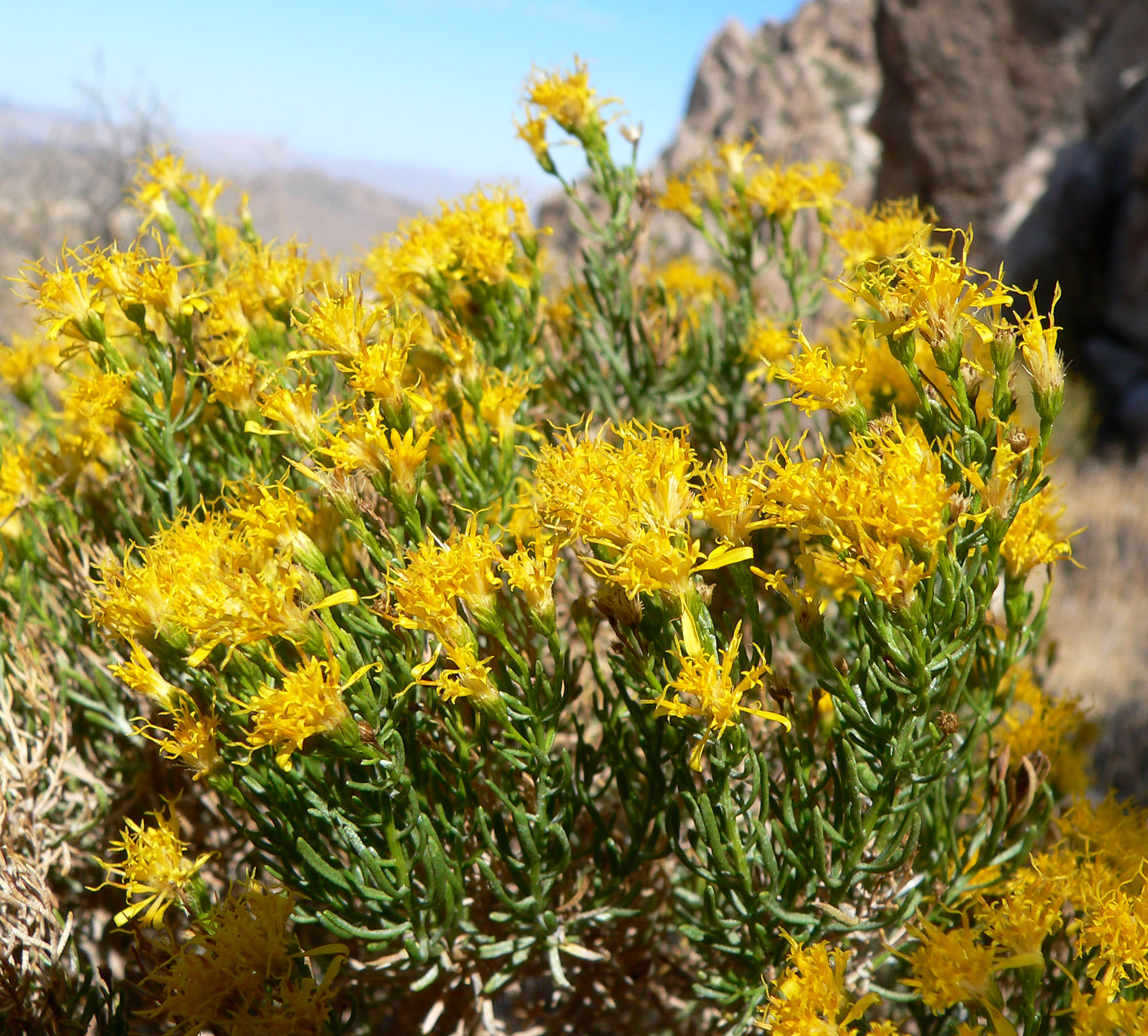

Scientific classification
- Kingdom: Plantae
- Clade: Tracheophytes
- Clade: Angiosperms
- Clade: Eudicots
- Clade: Asterids
- Order: Asterales
- Family: Asteraceae
- Genus: Ericameria
- Species: E. laricifolia

Binomial name
- Ericameria laricifolia (A.Gray) Shinners

Synonyms
- Aster laricifolius (A.Gray) Kuntze 1891 not(Hook.f.) F.Muell. 1865; Aster laricifolia (A.Gray) Kuntze 1891 not(Hook.f.) F.Muell. 1865; Bigelowia nelsonii Fernald; Chrysocoma laricifolia (A.Gray) Greene; Chrysoma laricifolia (A.Gray) Greene; Ericameria nelsonii (Fernald) S.F.Blake; Haplopappus laricifolius A.Gray; Aplopappus laricifolius A.Gray

= Ericameria laricifolia =

Species of flowering plant

Ericameria laricifolia is a North American species of flowering shrub in the family Asteraceae known by the common name turpentine bush, or turpentine-brush. It is native to the southwestern United States (Arizona, New Mexico, western Texas, southwestern Utah, southern Nevada, southeastern California) and northern Mexico (Chihuahua).

Ericameria laricifolia grows in desert scrub and woodlands. It is a shrub reaching 50–100 cm (20-40 inches) in height, is generally hairless, somewhat glandular, and aromatic. It sometimes has naked stems at the base but the upper branches are densely foliated in needlelike, pointed leaves one to three centimeters (0.4-1.2 inches) long. The many erect branches bear inflorescences of bright golden yellow flower heads, each with up to 16 long disc florets and as many as 6 ray florets.
