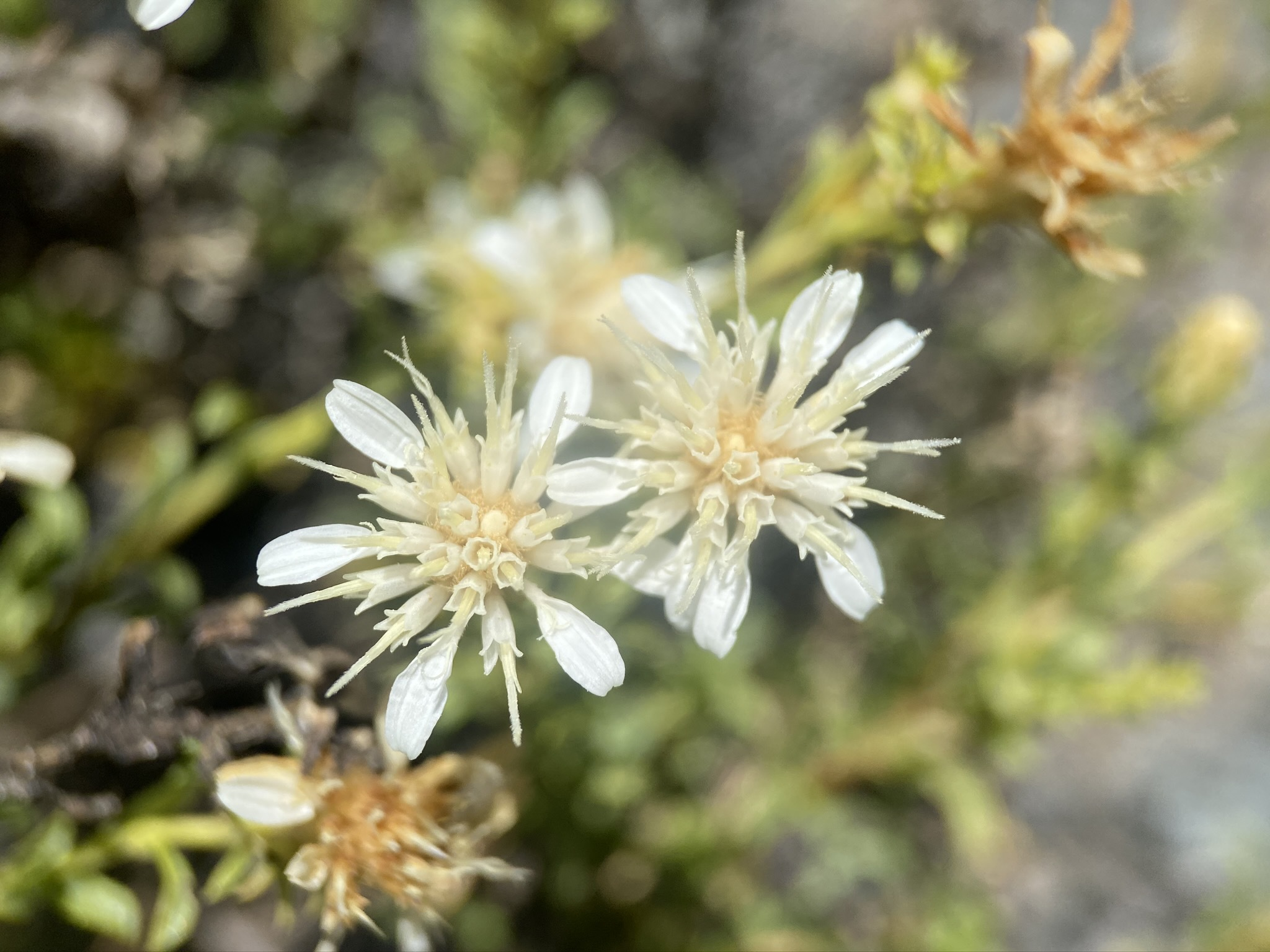

Conservation status
- Critically Imperiled (NatureServe)

Scientific classification
- Kingdom: Plantae
- Clade: Embryophytes
- Clade: Tracheophytes
- Clade: Angiosperms
- Clade: Eudicots
- Clade: Asterids
- Order: Asterales
- Family: Asteraceae
- Genus: Ericameria
- Species: E. gilmanii

Binomial name
- Ericameria gilmanii (S.F.Blake) G.L.Nesom

Synonyms
- Haplopappus gilmanii S.F.Blake

= Ericameria gilmanii =

Species of flowering plant

Ericameria gilmanii is a rare North American species of flowering plants in the family Asteraceae known by the common names Gilman's ericameria, Gilman's goldenbush, Gilman goldenweed, and whiteflower goldenbush. It is endemic to California, where it has been found in and east of the southern Sierra Nevada, in Inyo County and on Owens Peak in northeastern Kern County. It is a poorly known plant. There are six known populations, but only one has been observed in the last 20 years. Updating as of 2023, several observations of at least two populations have been observed since 2011.

Ericameria gilmanii is a shrub growing up to 50 centimeters (20 inches) tall. The foliage is aromatic. The leaves are up to 1.2 centimeters (0.5 inches) long, curved backward, and glandular and resinous. The inflorescence is generally a single flower head, or sometimes more than one. The head has a bell-shaped base with curving phyllaries which are green to tan. The head contains a few white ray florets and has white disc florets at the center. The fruit is a hairy achene which is roughly a centimeter long including its pappus.

Ericameria gilmanii grows in forests. The one known population is on United States Forest Service land. Other occurrences presumed to still exist are also on federal land.
