= Ericameria watsonii =

Conservation status
- Apparently Secure (NatureServe)

Scientific classification
- Kingdom: Plantae
- Clade: Tracheophytes
- Clade: Angiosperms
- Clade: Eudicots
- Clade: Asterids
- Order: Asterales
- Family: Asteraceae
- Genus: Ericameria
- Species: E. watsonii

Binomial name
- Ericameria watsonii (A.Gray) G.L.Nesom

Synonyms
- Aster serenoi Kuntze; Haplopappus watsonii A.Gray; Aplopappus watsonii A.Gray; Aplopappus watsoni A.Gray; Macronema watsonii (A.Gray) Greene

Species of flowering plant

Ericameria watsonii, or Watson's goldenbush, is a North American species of flowering shrubs from the family Asteraceae. It is native to the states of Nevada, Utah, and Arizona in the southwestern United States.

Ericameria watsonii is a branching shrub up to 40 cm (16 inches) tall, the stems green when young but become reddish-brown as they get old. Flower heads are yellow, with both ray florets and disc florets. It grows in desert scrublands, rocky slopes, and open pine woodlands.
