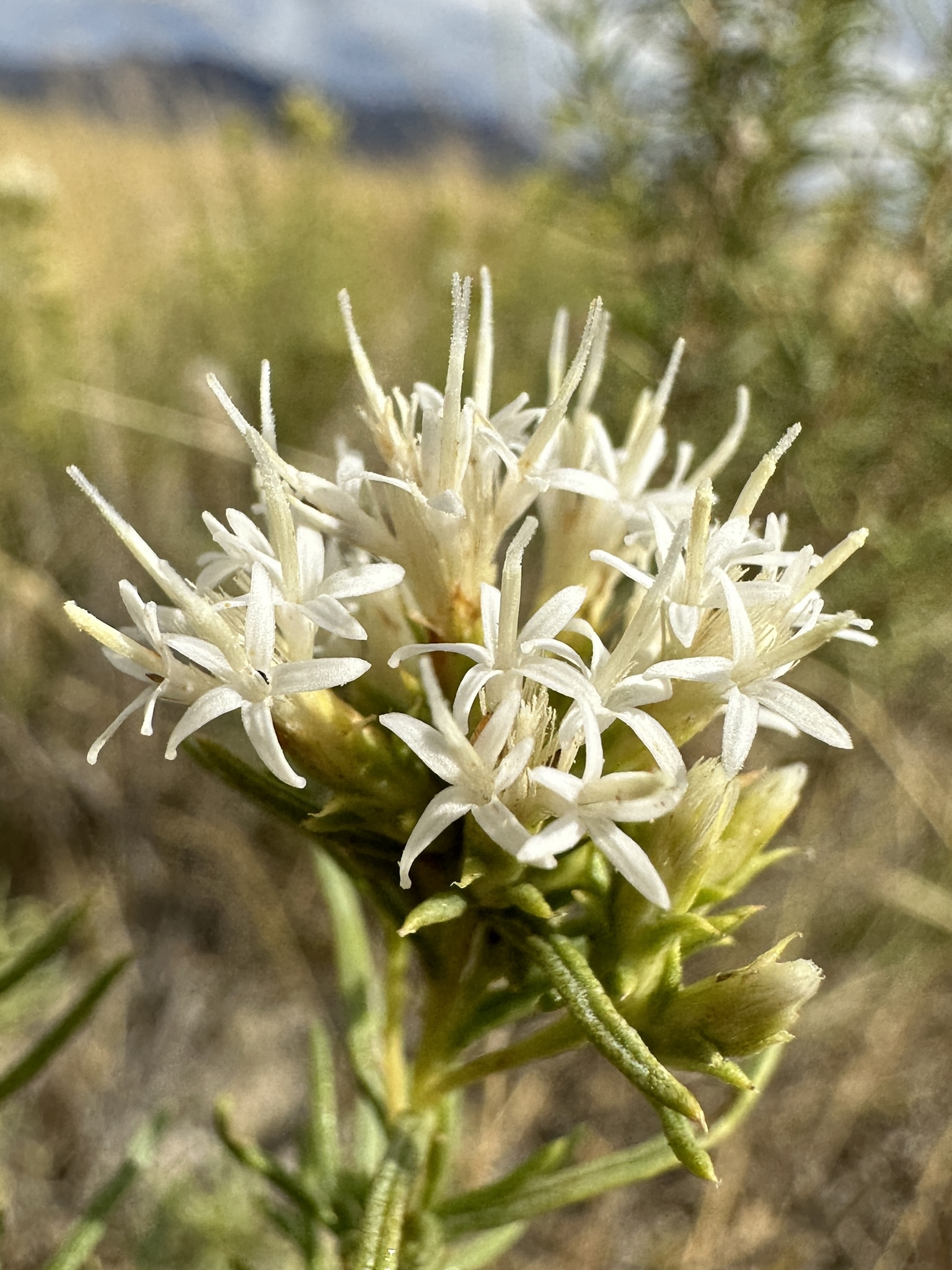

Conservation status
- Apparently Secure (NatureServe)

Scientific classification
- Kingdom: Plantae
- Clade: Tracheophytes
- Clade: Angiosperms
- Clade: Eudicots
- Clade: Asterids
- Order: Asterales
- Family: Asteraceae
- Genus: Ericameria
- Species: E. albida

Binomial name
- Ericameria albida (M.E.Jones ex A.Gray) L.C.Anderson

Synonyms
- Aster marcusii Kuntze; Bigelowia albida M.E.Jones ex A.Gray; Bigelovia albida M.E.Jones ex A.Gray; Chrysothamnus albidus (M.E.Jones ex A.Gray) Greene

= Ericameria albida =

Species of flowering plant

Ericameria albida is a North American species of flowering shrub in the family Asteraceae known by the common name white flowered rabbitbrush. It is native to desert regions in the western United States mostly in the Great Basin (Utah, Nevada, and eastern California (Inyo, Mono, and San Bernardino Counties; one report of it in Lassen County is from an urban area).

Ericameria albida grows in dry, alkaline plains in desert regions. It is a shrub sometimes reaching a height of 150 cm (4.9 ft). Leaves are thin and thread-like, up to 35 mm (1.4 in) long. The tips of its erect branches hold dense inflorescences of tiny flower heads with creamy white disc florets but no ray florets.
