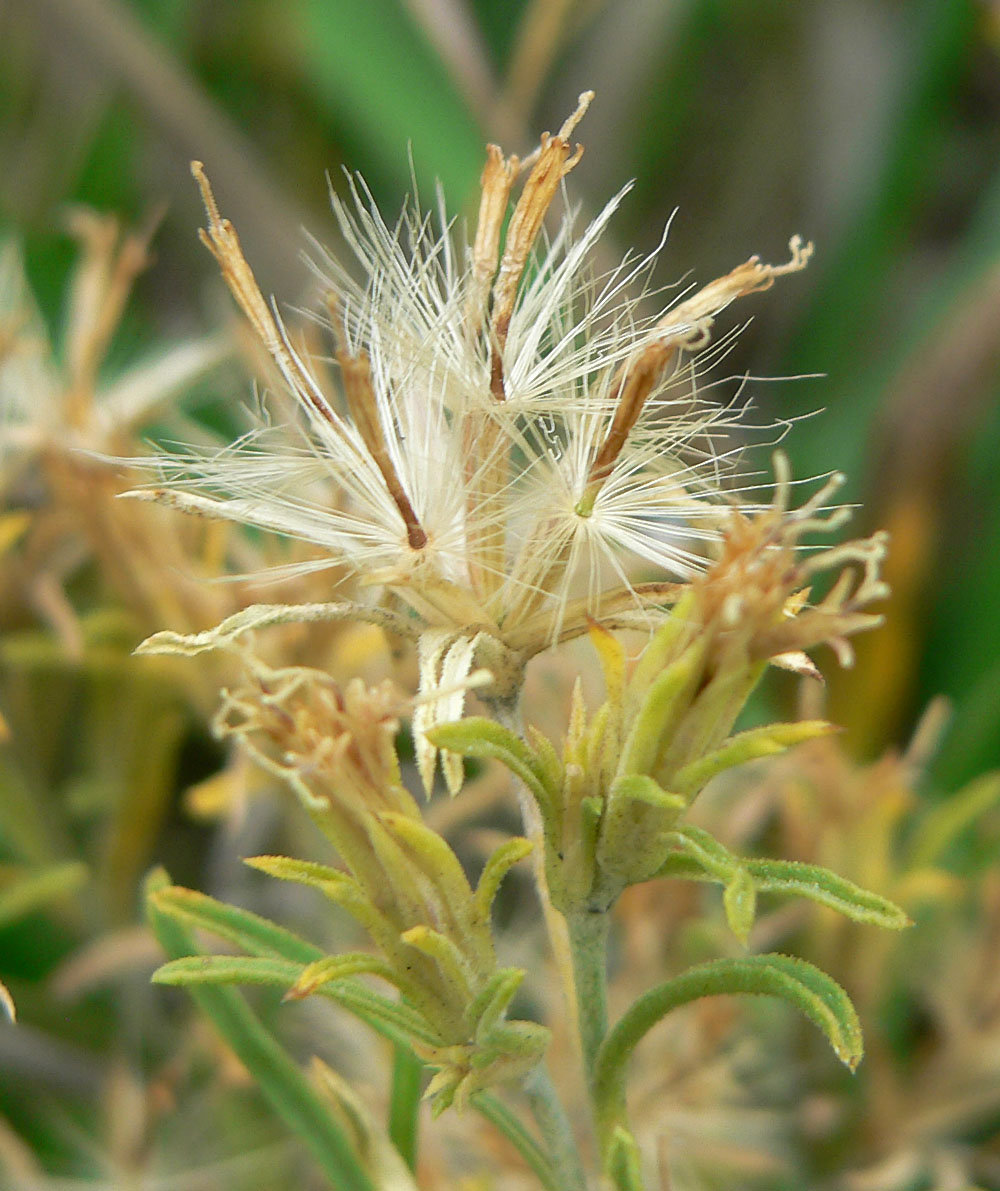
- Ericameria parryi var. aspera

Conservation status
- Secure (NatureServe)

Scientific classification
- Kingdom: Plantae
- Clade: Tracheophytes
- Clade: Angiosperms
- Clade: Eudicots
- Clade: Asterids
- Order: Asterales
- Family: Asteraceae
- Genus: Ericameria
- Species: E. parryi

Binomial name
- Ericameria parryi (A.Gray) G.L.Nesom & Baird

Synonyms
- Chrysothamnus parryi

= Ericameria parryi =

Species of flowering plant

Ericameria parryi (syn. Chrysothamnus parryi) is a species of flowering plant in the family Asteraceae known by the common name Parry's rabbitbrush. It is native to much of the western United States.

This plant is quite variable, with certain characters defining each of its many varieties. In general, it is a shrub producing several upright stems reaching 10 centimeters to one meter tall, but usually not reaching that height. The branches are coated in a fuzz of white or greenish fibers. The leaves are linear to spatula-shaped and measure one to 8 centimeters long. The leaves are hairless to quite hairy or woolly in texture, and they may be glandular and sticky. The inflorescence is often a mass of many flower heads, but sometimes the heads are solitary. Each head has up to 20 yellow disc florets. There are no ray florets. The fruit is an achene up to 8 millimeters long tipped with a whitish or brown pappus up to 7.5 millimeters in length.

Flowering occurs mostly in July through September, and the achenes develop and disperse in the fall and into the winter. The seed is wind-dispersed. The plant's lifespan is 15 to 20 years.

This hardy plant occupies several habitat types. It can be found in mountains and foothills and its population will often increase upon environmental disturbance, such as grazing.

There are at least 12 varieties:

- Ericameria parryi var. affinis - limited to Colorado, New Mexico, and Arizona
- Ericameria parryi var. aspera - (rough rabbitbrush) limited to California and Nevada
- Ericameria parryi var. attenuata - (narrow-bract rabbitbrush)
- Ericameria parryi var. howardii - (Howard's rabbitbrush) in and east of the Rocky Mountains
- Ericameria parryi var. imula - (low rabbitbrush) small-statured variety endemic to San Bernardino County, California, around Bear Valley
- Ericameria parryi var. latior - (broadleaf rabbitbrush) limited to northern California
- Ericameria parryi var. monocephala - (one-headed rabbitbrush) common in the Sierra Nevada of eastern California and western Nevada
- Ericameria parryi var. montana - (mountain rabbitbrush) small plant known only from the Red Conglomerate Peaks of Idaho and Montana
- Ericameria parryi var. nevadensis - (Nevada rabbitbrush)
- Ericameria parryi var. parryi - widespread in interior west
- Ericameria parryi var. salmonensis - (Salmon River rabbitbrush) endemic to Idaho, where it grows along the Salmon River
- Ericameria parryi var. vulcanica - (Vulcan rabbitbrush) uncommon, small variety endemic to the Sierra Nevada of California
