= Ericameria crispa =

Scientific classification
- Kingdom: Plantae
- Clade: Tracheophytes
- Clade: Angiosperms
- Clade: Eudicots
- Clade: Asterids
- Order: Asterales
- Family: Asteraceae
- Genus: Ericameria
- Species: E. crispa

Binomial name
- Ericameria crispa (L.C.Anderson) G.L.Nesom

Synonyms
- Haplopappus crispus L.C.Anderson

Species of flowering plant

Ericameria crispa, the crisped goldenbush, is a rare North American species of flowering plants in the family Asteraceae. It has been found only on mountain slopes in the state of Utah in the western United States.

Ericameria crispa is a branching shrub up to 40 cm (16 inches) tall. Leaves are oblanceolate to spatulate, up to 30 mm (1.2 inches) long. One plant can produce many small, yellow flower heads, each with 14–24 disc florets but no ray florets.
