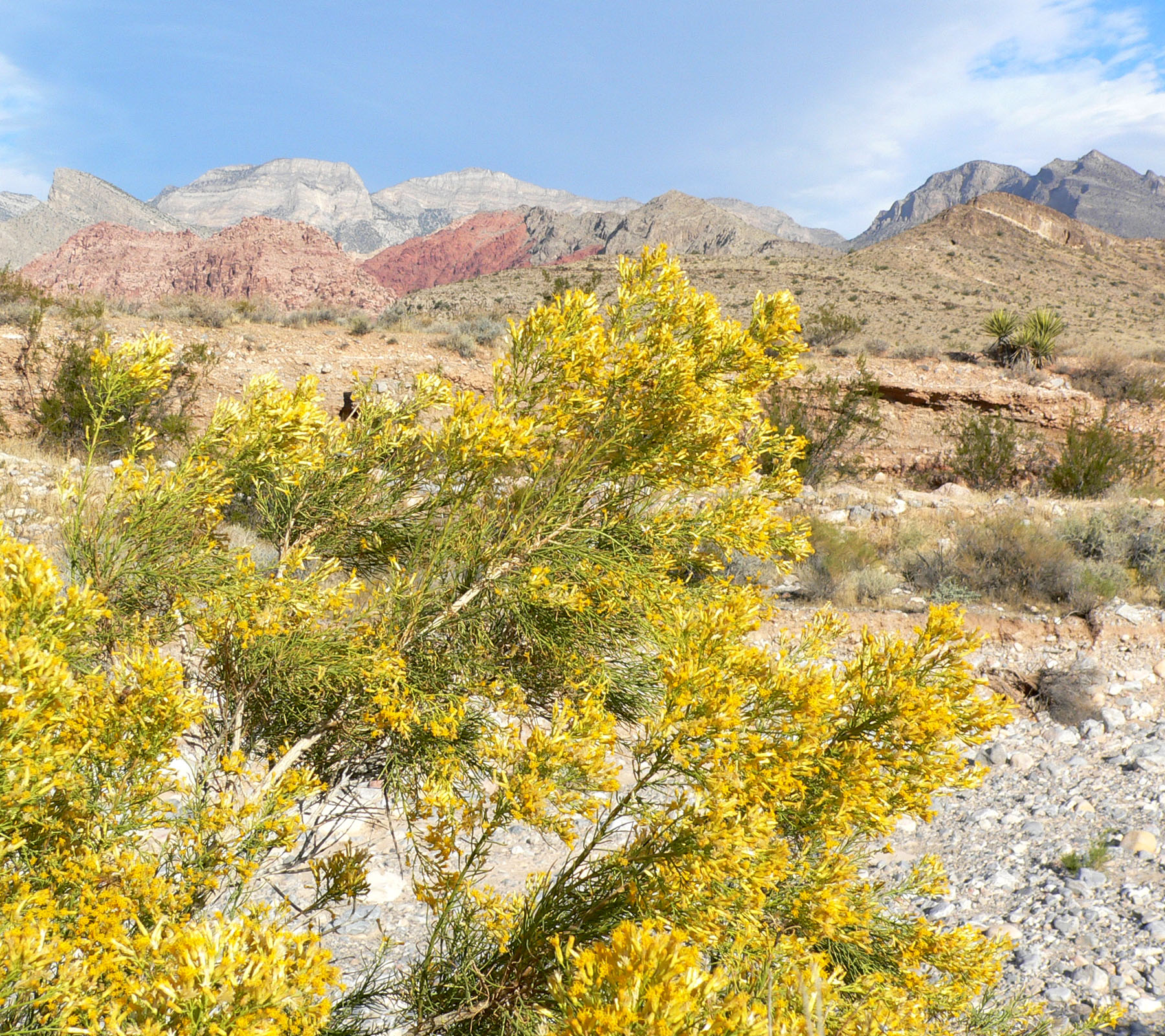

Conservation status
- Secure (NatureServe)

Scientific classification
- Kingdom: Plantae
- Clade: Tracheophytes
- Clade: Angiosperms
- Clade: Eudicots
- Clade: Asterids
- Order: Asterales
- Family: Asteraceae
- Genus: Ericameria
- Species: E. paniculata

Binomial name
- Ericameria paniculata (A.Gray) Rydb.

Synonyms
- Aster asae Kuntze; Bigelowia paniculata A.Gray; Bigelovia paniculata A.Gray; Chrysoma paniculata (A.Gray) Greene; Chrysothamnus paniculatus (A.Gray) H.M.Hall

= Ericameria paniculata =

Species of flowering plant

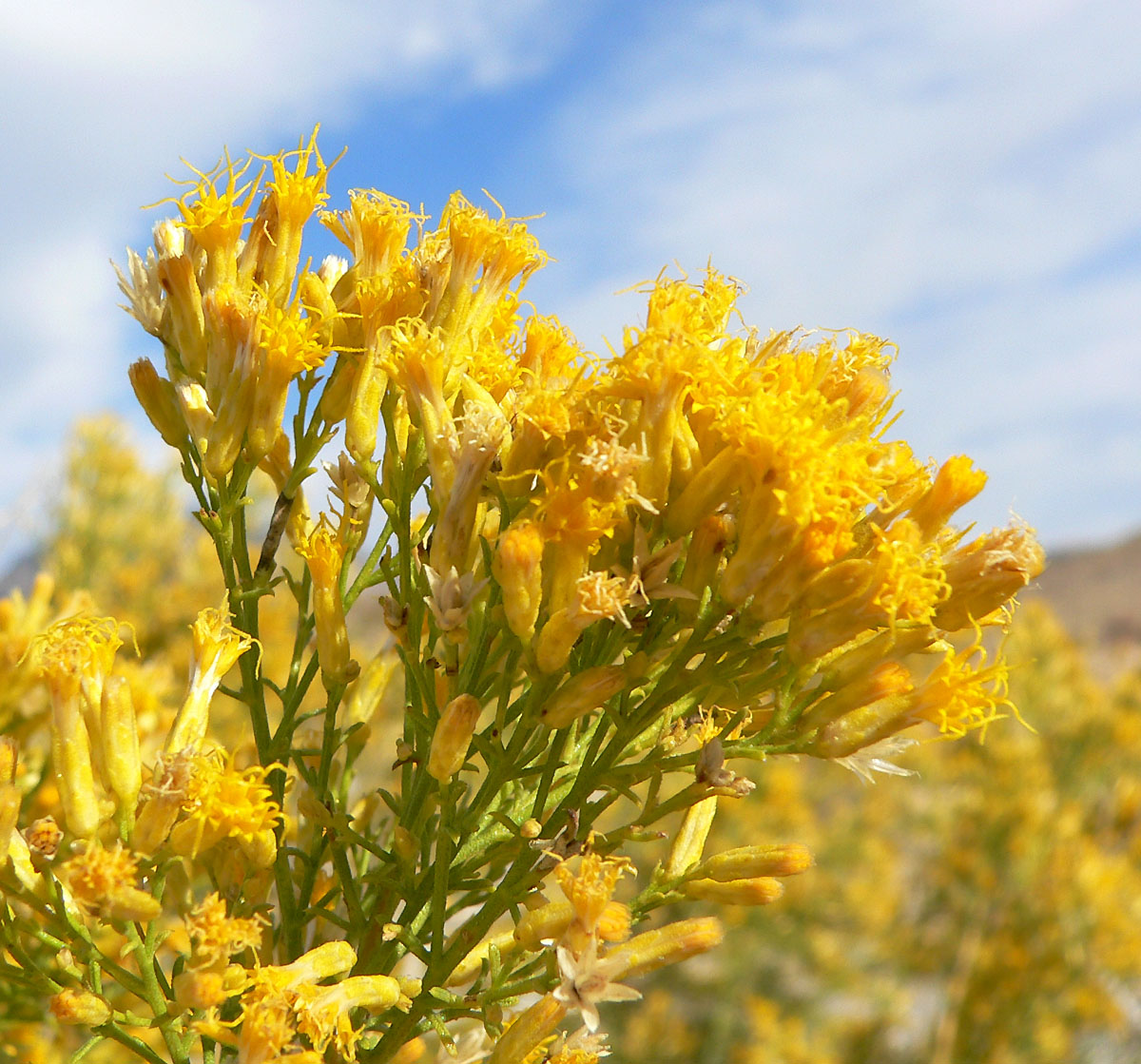

Ericameria paniculata (formerly Chrysothamnus paniculatus) is a species of flowering plant in the sunflower family Asteraceae, native to the southwestern United States. It is an evergreen yellow-flowered desert shrub.

It is known by several common names, including black-banded rabbitbrush, Mojave rabbitbrush, and punctate rabbitbrush. The stems often have black, gummy bands.

== Description ==
Ericameria paniculata is a branching shrub reaching up to 2 meters (80 inches) tall. The spreading or erect stems are glandular and resinous and are often banded or splotched with black from a smut fungus Puccinia splendens. The glandular leaves are filiform (thread-shaped or narrowly oblanceolate) up to 3.5 centimeters (1.4 inches) in length.

The inflorescence is an array of small, yellow flower heads, each of which contains 5 to 8 disc florets but no ray florets. The fruit is up to a centimeter (0.4 inches) long including its long pappus. They are wind-dispersed.

It flowers from June to December.

== Range and habitat ==
Ericameria paniculata is native to the deserts of Arizona, Nevada, southern California, southwestern Utah. It is particularly common in the Mojave Desert.

It is found in a great variety of habitats, including disturbed areas such as roadsides. It tolerates poor soils. Its companions may include Larrea tridentata (creosote), Yucca brevifolia (Joshua tree), Baccharis, Hymenoclea salsola (white burrobush), Atriplex polycarpa (desert saltbush), and Acacia greggii (catclaw acacia).
