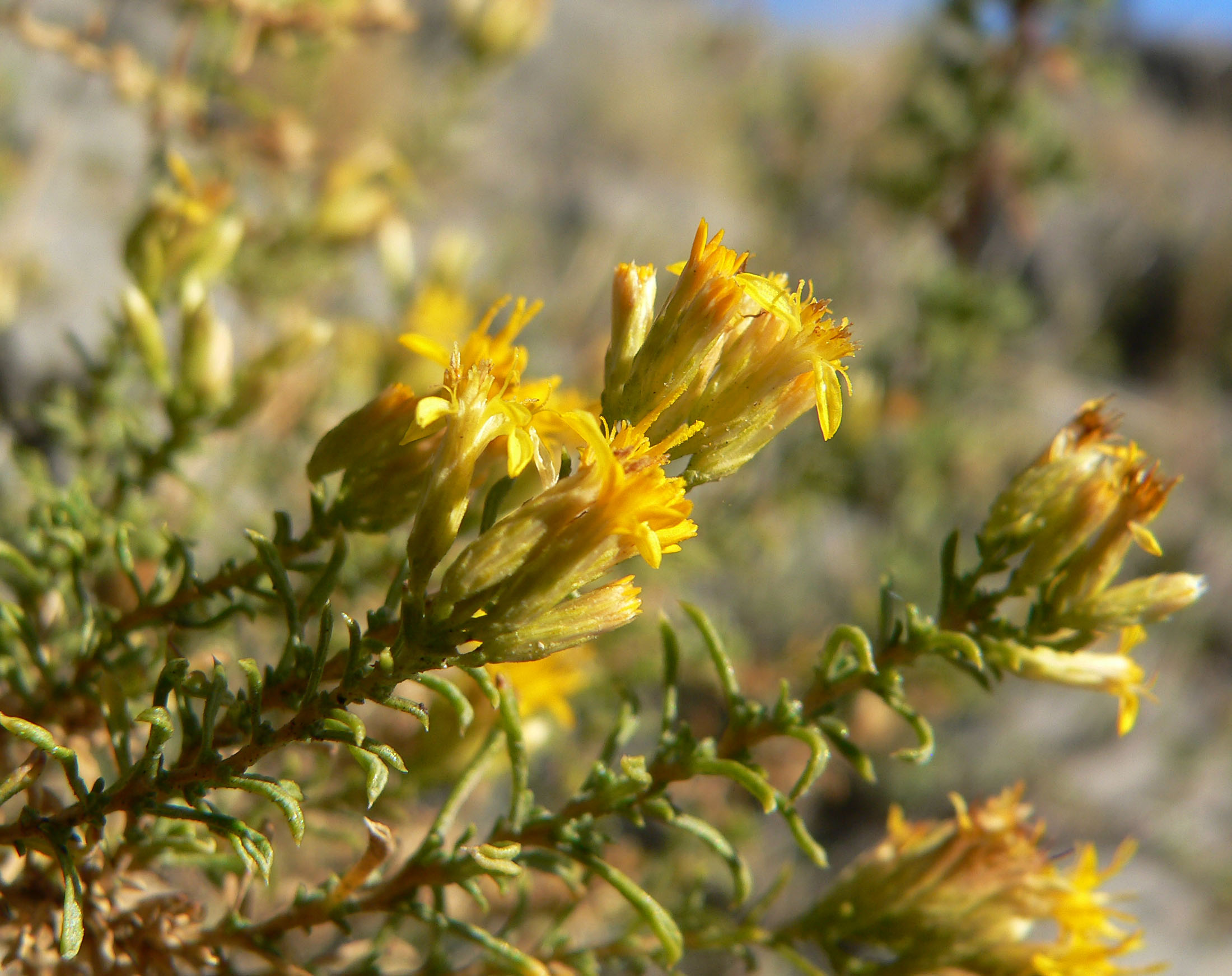

Conservation status
- Secure (NatureServe)

Scientific classification
- Kingdom: Plantae
- Clade: Tracheophytes
- Clade: Angiosperms
- Clade: Eudicots
- Clade: Asterids
- Order: Asterales
- Family: Asteraceae
- Genus: Ericameria
- Species: E. nana

Binomial name
- Ericameria nana Nutt.

Synonyms
- Aster resinotus Kuntze; Chrysoma nana Greene; Chrysothamnus nanus Howel; Ericameria cervina (S.Watson) Rydb.; Haplopappus cervinus S.Watson; Haplopappus nanus (Nutt.) Eaton

= Ericameria nana =

Species of plant

Ericameria nana is a North American species of flowering shrub in the family Asteraceae known by the common names dwarf goldenbush and rubberweed. It is native to the western United States from eastern California, southeastern Oregon, Nevada, Idaho, Utah, and southwestern Montana.

== Description ==
Ericameria nana grows along cliffs and rocky hillsides. This is a small shrub rarely reaching a maximum height of 50 cm (20 inches). It is covered in a foliage of sticky, curved, somewhat fleshy leaves about 1 centimeter (0.4 inches) long. The tips of its erect branches hold dense inflorescences of tiny flower heads with cream white to yellow disc and ray florets. There are rigid, intricately branched stems that are up to 3 decimeters tall. The spreading, alternate, leaves are either linear or narrowly lance-shaped. The leaves are between 10 and 15 millimeters long and are on the upper half of the stems. Clusters of small leaves are found on the principal leaf axils. Each flower head is between 6 and 9 millimeters high and have several straw-colored bracts. The 3 to 10 yellow rays are between 2 and 4 millimeters long. The bloom period is between the months of July and November.
