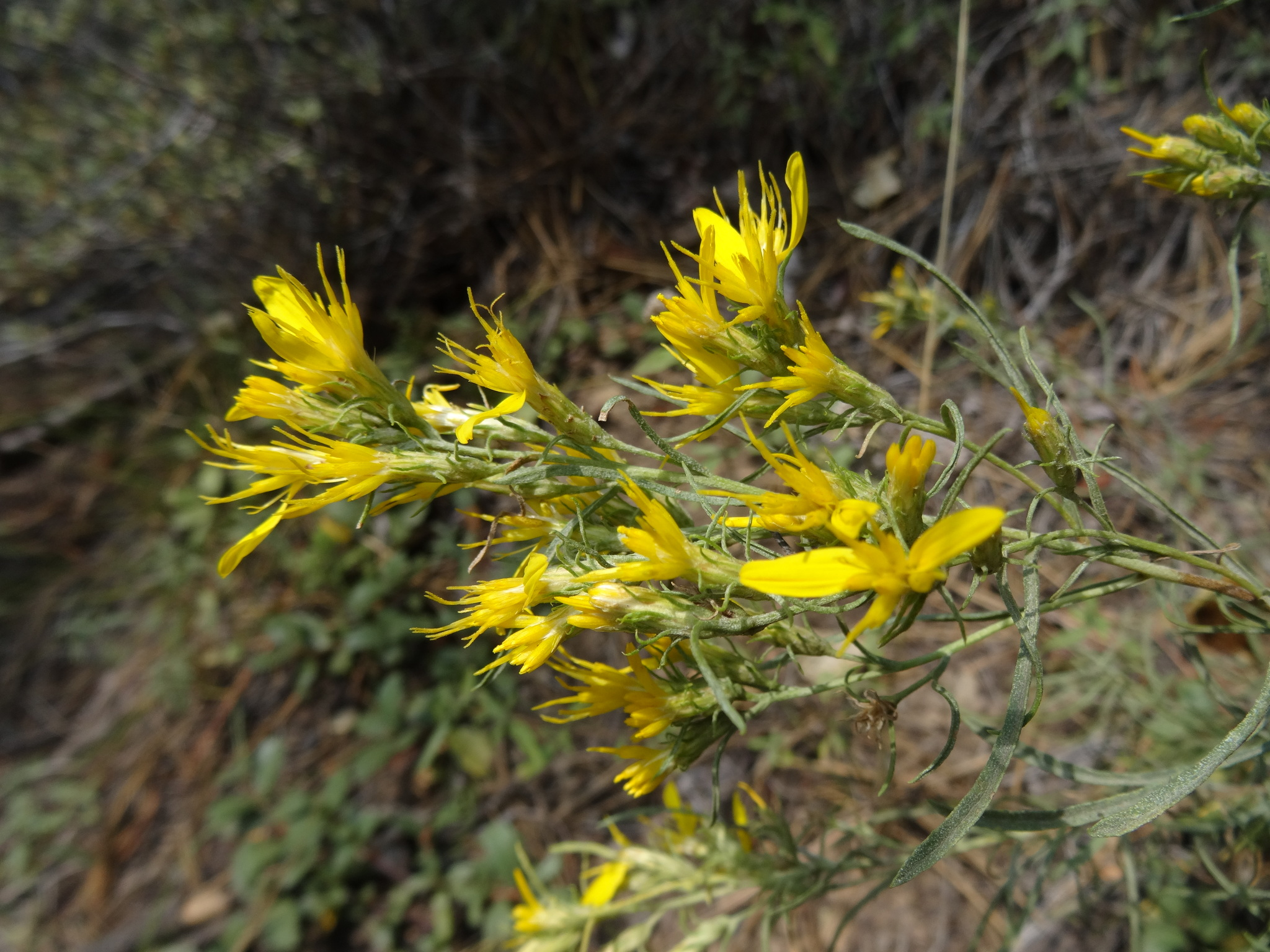

Scientific classification
- Kingdom: Plantae
- Clade: Tracheophytes
- Clade: Angiosperms
- Clade: Eudicots
- Clade: Asterids
- Order: Asterales
- Family: Asteraceae
- Genus: Ericameria
- Species: E. bloomeri

Binomial name
- Ericameria bloomeri (Gray) J.F.Macbr.

Synonyms
- Aster bloomeri (A.Gray) Kuntze 1891 not A.Gray 1865; Chrysothamnus bloomeri (A.Gray) Greene; Ericameria erecta Klatt; Haplopappus bloomeri A.Gray; Aplopappus bloomeri A.Gray

= Ericameria bloomeri =

Species of flowering plant

Ericameria bloomeri, known by the common names Bloomer's rabbitbush and Bloomer's goldenbush, is a species of flowering shrub in the family Asteraceae. This plant is native to the mountains of western North America from British Columbia to California, including Washington, Oregon, Idaho, and Nevada. It may have been extirpated from Canada.

Ericameria bloomeri grows in coniferous forests. This is a small shrub reaching a maximum height of about 50 centimeters (20 inches) and covered in a foliage of threadlike to slightly oval leaves a few centimeters long. It may be glandular and resinous and slightly woolly or hairless. Atop each of the many erect branches is an inflorescence of golden yellow flower heads. Each centimeter-wide head has up to 14 disc florets and sometimes up to 5 ray florets but sometimes none. The dense inflorescence has resin glands and some woolly fibers.
