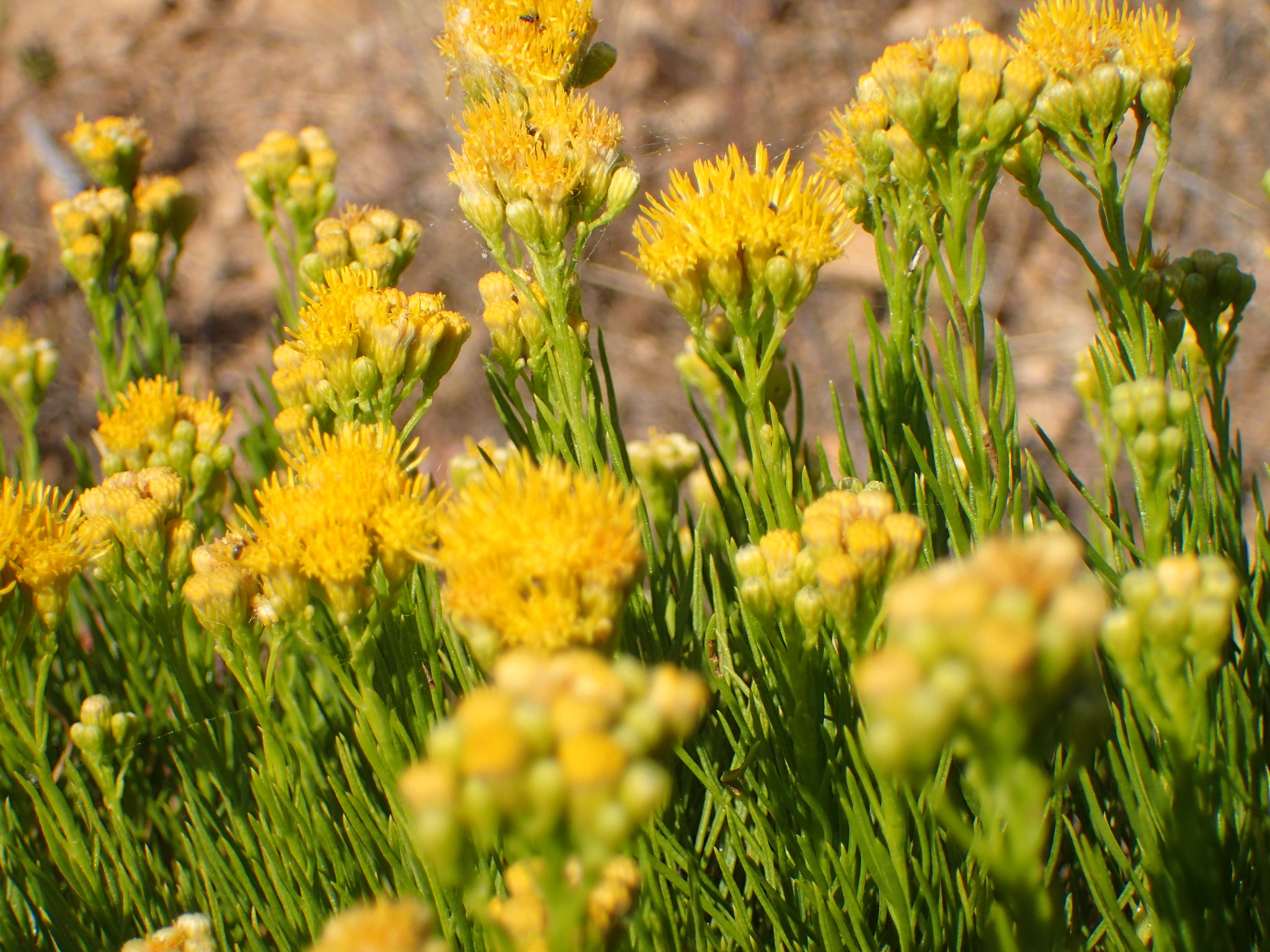

Scientific classification
- Kingdom: Plantae
- Clade: Tracheophytes
- Clade: Angiosperms
- Clade: Eudicots
- Clade: Asterids
- Order: Asterales
- Family: Asteraceae
- Genus: Ericameria
- Species: E. arborescens

Binomial name
- Ericameria arborescens (Gray) Greene

Synonyms
- Aster chrysothamnus Kuntze; Bigelowia arborescens A.Gray; Chrysoma arborescens (A.Gray) Greene; Haplopappus arborescens (A.Gray) H.M.Hall; Linosyris arborescens A.Gray

= Ericameria arborescens =

Species of flowering plant

Ericameria arborescens is a North American species of flowering plants in the family Asteraceae known by the common name goldenfleece. It is widespread across much of California and found also in southwestern Oregon.

Ericameria arborescens grows in chaparral communities and open woodlands. This is a resinous, glandular shrub or small tree occasionally exceeding 5 meters (over 17 feet) in height. It has many erect branches covered in very thin, needle-like to lance-shaped leaves 3-6 centimeters (1.2-2.4 inches) long. Atop each stem is an inflorescence of many bright golden flowers, each a rounded bunch of disc florets about 5 mm (0.2 inches) wide. This plant is adapted to ecosystems prone to wildfire.
