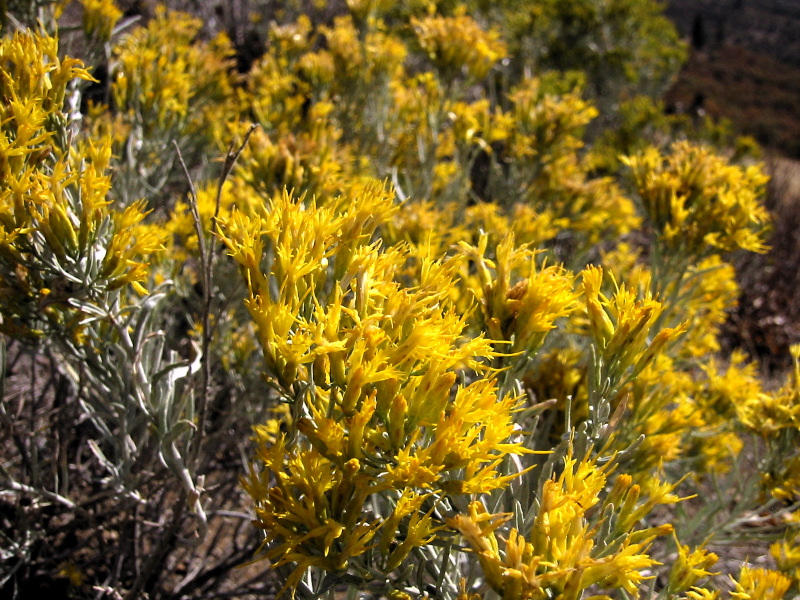
- Ericameria nauseosa

Scientific classification
- Kingdom: Plantae
- Clade: Tracheophytes
- Clade: Angiosperms
- Clade: Eudicots
- Clade: Asterids
- Order: Asterales
- Family: Asteraceae
- Subfamily: Asteroideae
- Tribe: Astereae
- Subtribe: Pentachaetinae
- Genus: Ericameria; Nutt.

Synonyms
- Haplopappus sect. Stenotopsis (Rydb.) H.M.Hall; Haplopappus sect. Macronema (Nutt.) A.Gray; Haplopappus sect. Asiris H.M.Hall; Ericameria sect. Stenotopsis (Rydb.) Urbatsch & Wussow; Stenotopsis Rydb.; Haplopappus sect. Ericameria (Nutt.) A.Gray; Macronema Nutt.

= Ericameria =

Genus of flowering plants

Ericameria is a genus of North American shrubs in the family Asteraceae.

Ericameria is known by the common names goldenbush, rabbitbrush, turpentine bush, and rabbitbush. Most are shrubs, but one species (E. parishii) can reach tree stature. They are distributed in western Canada (Saskatchewan, Alberta, British Columbia) western United States (from the western Great Plains to the Pacific) and northern Mexico. Bright yellow flower heads adorn the plants in late summer. All the species have disc florets, while some have ray florets but others do not. Ericameria nauseosa, (synonym Chrysothamnus nauseosus), is known for its production of latex.

== Etymology ==
Ericameria is based on the genus name Erica and the Greek word meros ('part'), in reference to the similarity of the plant's leaves to those of Erica.

== Uses ==
This genus has a number of admirable landscape plants for heavily alkaline soils, but most species need extensive rejuvenation pruning every three years, making not ideal for common yards. Overwatering will kill the plants.

Ericameria species are used as food plants by the larvae of some Lepidoptera species including Schinia argentifascia, Schinia tertia, Schinia unimacula and Schinia walsinghami.

== Selected species ==
=== Ericameria section Asiris ===
- Ericameria albida
- Ericameria arizonica
- Ericameria cervina
- Ericameria discoidea
- Ericameria gilmanii
- Ericameria lignumviridis
- Ericameria nana
- Ericameria nauseosa (syn. Chrysothamnus nauseosus) — Chamisa, rubber rabbitbrush, gray rabbitbrush
- Ericameria obovata
- Ericameria ophitidis
- Ericameria parryi — Parry's rabbitbrush
- Ericameria resinosa
- Ericameria watsonii

=== Ericameria section Ericameria ===
- Ericameria arborescens — Golden-fleece; exclusive food plant of the moth Bucculatrix ericameriae
- Ericameria brachylepis — Boundary goldenbush
- Ericameria cooperi
- Ericameria cuneata
- Ericameria ericoides — Mock heather, goldenbush
- Ericameria fasciculata — Eastwood's goldenbush
- Ericameria juarezensis
- Ericameria laricifolia
- Ericameria linearifolia
- Ericameria martirensis
- Ericameria palmeri — Palmer's goldenweed, false broomweed
- Ericameria paniculata — Sticky rabbitbrush, black-banded rabbitbrush
- Ericameria parishii
- Ericameria pinifolia — Pine goldenbush
- Ericameria teretifolia — Needle-leaved rabbitbrush

=== Ericameria section Macronema ===
- Ericameria bloomeri
- Ericameria compacta
- Ericameria crispa
- Ericameria greenei
- Ericameria suffruticosa
- Ericameria winwardii
- Ericameria zionis
