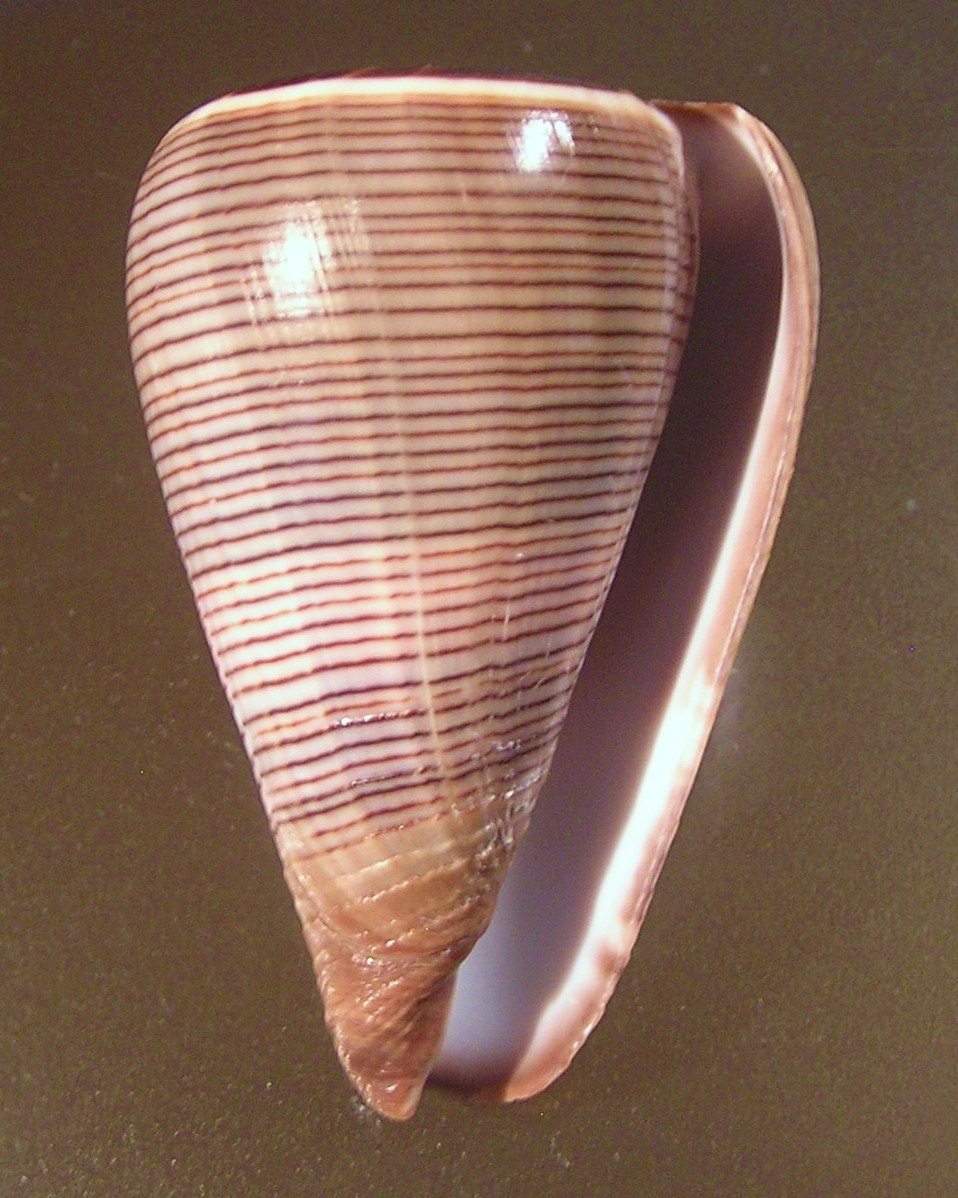
- Apertural view of shell of Conus buxeus (Röding, 1798)

Scientific classification
- Kingdom: Animalia
- Phylum: Mollusca
- Class: Gastropoda
- Subclass: Caenogastropoda
- Order: Neogastropoda
- Family: Conidae
- Genus: Conus
- Subgenus: Dendroconus; Swainson, 1840

Type species
- Conus betulinus Linnaeus, 1758

Synonyms
- Cleobula Iredale, 1930; Dendroconus Swainson, 1840

= Conus (Dendroconus) =

Subgenus of gastropods

Dendroconus is a subgenus of sea snails, marine gastropod molluscs in the genus Conus, family Conidae, the cone snails and their allies.

In the new classification of the family Conidae by Puillandre N., Duda T.F., Meyer C., Olivera B.M. & Bouchet P. (2015), Dendroconus has become a subgenus of Conus: Conus (Dendroconus) Tucker & Tenorio, 2013 represented as Conus Linnaeus, 1758

== Distinguishing characteristics ==
The Tucker & Tenorio 2009 taxonomy distinguishes Dendroconus from Conus in the following ways:

- Genus Conus Linnaeus, 1758

Shell characters (living and fossil species)

The basic shell shape is conical to elongated conical, has a deep anal notch on the shoulder, a smooth periostracum and a small operculum. The shoulder of the shell is usually nodulose and the protoconch is usually multispiral. Markings often include the presence of tents except for black or white color variants, with the absence of spiral lines of minute tents and textile bars.

Radular tooth (not known for fossil species)

The radula has an elongated anterior section with serrations and a large exposed terminating cusp, a non-obvious waist, blade is either small or absent and has a short barb, and lacks a basal spur.

Geographical distribution

These species are found in the Indo-Pacific region.

Feeding habits

These species eat other gastropods including cones.

- Subgenus Dendroconus Swainson, 1840

Shell characters (living and fossil species)

The shell is large, thick, and turgid to conical in shape. The protoconch is multispiral and nodules are either absent or die out in later whorls. The shoulders are rounded and the shell is ornamented with cords which become numerous and very small in the outer whorls. The anal notch is shallow. The periostracum may be smooth but is often thick and ridged, and the operculum is small.

Radular tooth (not known for fossil species)

The anterior section of the radula is equal to or slightly longer than the posterior section. The blade is fairly long and covers at least half the length of the anterior section of the radular tooth. A basal spur is present, and the barb is short. The radular tooth has serrations and the terminating cusp is exposed along the shaft.

Geographical distribution

These species are found in the Indo-Pacific region.

Feeding habits

These species are vermivorous (meaning that they prey on marine worms).

== Species list ==
This list of species is based on the information in the World Register of Marine Species (WoRMS) list. Species within the genus Dendroconus include:

- Dendroconus betulinus (Linnaeus, 1758): synonym of Conus betulinus Linnaeus, 1758
- Dendroconus biliosus (Röding, 1798: synonym of Conus biliosus (Röding, 1798)
- Dendroconus buxeus (Röding, 1798): synonym of Conus buxeus (Röding, 1798)
- Dendroconus figulinus (Linnaeus, 1758): synonym of Conus figulinus Linnaeus, 1758
- Dendroconus glaucus (Linnaeus, 1758): synonym of Conus glaucus Linnaeus, 1758
- Dendroconus medoci (Lorenz, 2004): synonym of Conus medoci Lorenz, 2004
- Dendroconus neoroseus da Motta, 1993: synonym of Conus biliosus (Röding, 1798)
- Dendroconus royaikeni Veldsman, 2010: synonym of Conus royaikeni (S. G. Veldsman, 2010)
- Dendroconus suratensis (Hwass in Bruguière, 1792): synonym of Conus suratensis Hwass in Bruguière, 1792
