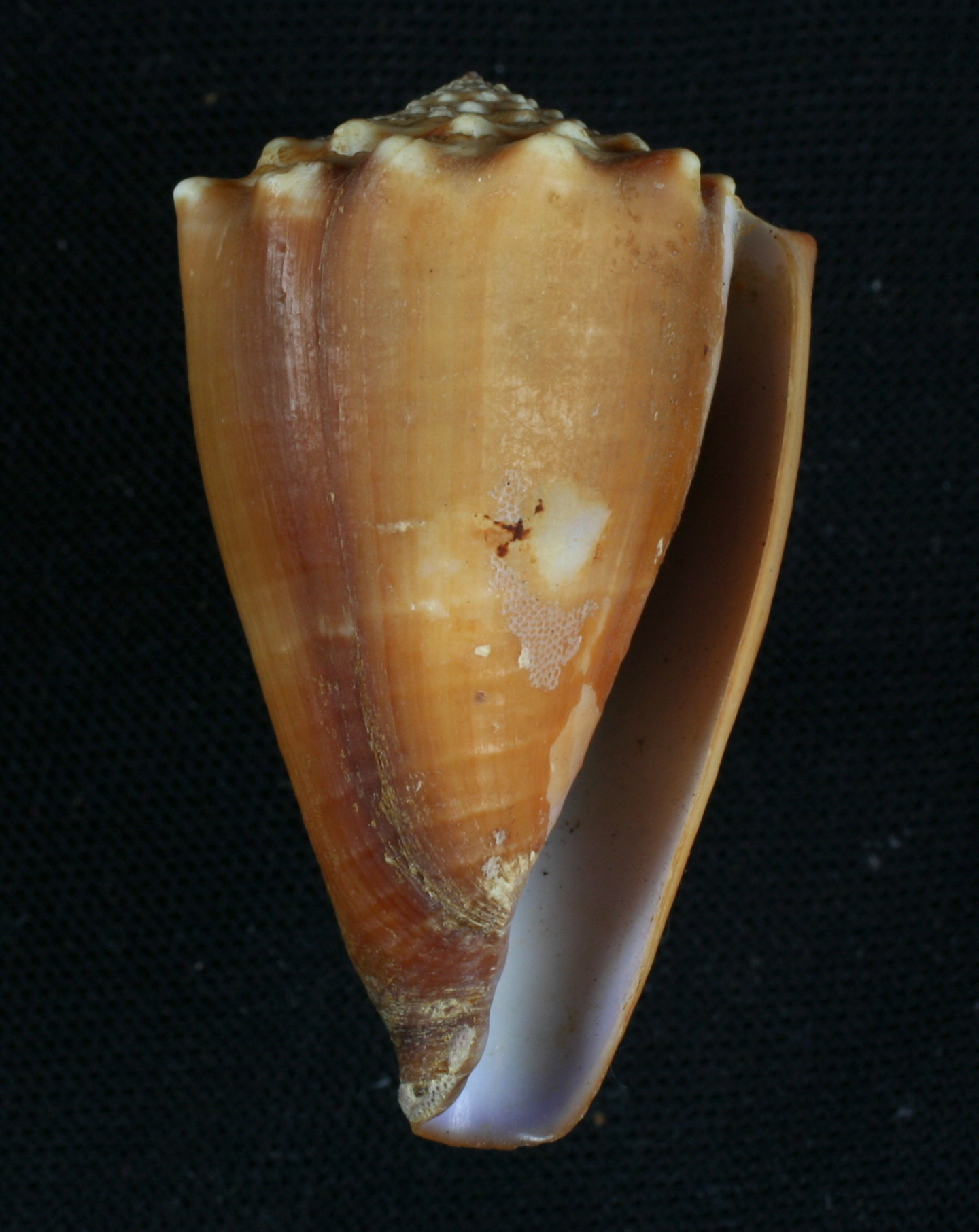
- Apertural view of shell of Conus diadema (G.B. Sowerby II, 1834), measuring 44.5 mm in height, collected at 20 ft. off west side of Ceralbo Island, in Mexico

Scientific classification
- Kingdom: Animalia
- Phylum: Mollusca
- Class: Gastropoda
- Subclass: Caenogastropoda
- Order: Neogastropoda
- Family: Conidae
- Genus: Conus
- Subgenus: Lividoconus; Wils, 1970

Type species
- Conus lividus Hwass in Bruguière, 1792

Synonyms
- Calamiconus J. K. Tucker & M. Tenorio, 2009; Lividoconus Wils, 1970

= Conus (Lividoconus) =

Subgenus of gastropods

Lividoconus is a subgenus of sea snails, marine gastropod molluscs in the genus Conus, family Conidae, the cone snails and their allies.

In the latest classification of the family Conidae by Puillandre N., Duda T.F., Meyer C., Olivera B.M. & Bouchet P. (2015), Lividoconus has become a subgenus of Conus as Conus (Lividoconus) Wils, 1970 (type species Conus lividus Hwass in Bruguière, 1792) represented as Conus Linnaeus, 1758

== Distinguishing characteristics ==
The Tucker & Tenorio 2009 taxonomy distinguishes Lividoconus from Conus in the following ways:

- Genus Conus sensu stricto Linnaeus, 1758

Shell characters (living and fossil species)

The basic shell shape is conical to elongated conical, has a deep anal notch on the shoulder, a smooth periostracum and a small operculum. The shoulder of the shell is usually nodulose and the protoconch is usually multispiral. Markings often include the presence of tents except for black or white color variants, with the absence of spiral lines of minute tents and textile bars.

Radular tooth (not known for fossil species)

The radula has an elongated anterior section with serrations and a large exposed terminating cusp, a non-obvious waist, blade is either small or absent and has a short barb, and lacks a basal spur.

Geographical distribution

These species are found in the Indo-Pacific region.

Feeding habits

These species eat other gastropods including cones.

- Subgenus Lividoconus Wils, 1970

Shell characters (living and fossil species)

The shell is obconic in shape. The protoconch is multispiral. The shell is ornamented with nodules which either persist or die out in the outer whorls. The anal notch is shallow. The shell has a distinct interior color layer and well developed constrictions inside the aperture. The anterior end of the shell is blue-black, blue or brown in color. The periostracum is tufted, and the operculum is small to moderate in size.

Radular tooth (not known for fossil species)

The radular tooth is elongated, and the anterior section of the radular tooth is equal to slightly longer than the length of posterior section. A basal spur is present, and the barb and blade are short. A partially exposed terminating cusp is present.

Geographical distribution

The majority of the species in this genus occur in the Indo-Pacific region, and one species occurs in the Eastern-Pacific region..

Feeding habits

These cone snails are vermivorous, meaning that the cones prey on a broad variety of polychaete worms, including enteropneust, eunicid, terebellid, cirratulid, maldanid, and nereid worms, and hemichordates.

== Species list ==
This list of species is based on the information in the World Register of Marine Species (WoRMS) list. Species within the genus Lividoconus include:

- Lividoconus biliosus (Röding, 1798) is equivalent to Conus biliosus (Röding, 1798)
- Lividoconus conco (Puillandre, Stöcklin, Favreau, Bianchi, Perret, Rivasseau, Limpalaër, Monnier & Bouchet, 2015): synonym of Conus conco Puillandre, Stöcklin, Favreau, Bianchi, Perret, Rivasseau, Limpalaër, Monnier & Bouchet, 2015
- Lividoconus diadema (G.B. Sowerby I, 1834) is equivalent to Conus diadema G. B. Sowerby I, 1834
- Lividoconus floridulus (A. Adams & Reeve, 1848) is equivalent to Conus floridulus A. Adams & Reeve, 1848
- Lividoconus lividus (Hwass in Bruguière, 1792) is equivalent to Conus lividus Hwass in Bruguière, 1792
- Lividoconus muriculatus (G.B. Sowerby I, 1833) is equivalent to Conus muriculatus G. B. Sowerby I, 1833
- Lividoconus sanguinolentus (Quoy & Gaimard, 1834) is equivalent to Conus sanguinolentus Quoy & Gaimard, 1834
