= C. glaucus =

C. glaucus may refer to:

- Callistemon glaucus, a shrub in the myrtle family
- Caulanthus glaucus, a plant in the mustard family
- Chiton glaucus, the green chiton
- Coluber glaucus, now Bothrops lanceolatus, the fer-de-lance snake
- Conus glaucus, a species of cone snail
- Craugastor glaucus, a species of frog

== See also ==
- Glaucus (disambiguation)
