= Fig cone =

Fig cone refers to two species of sea snails in the Conus genus:

- Conus buxeus
- Conus figulinus
