= Caulanthus major =

Scientific classification
- Kingdom: Plantae
- Clade: Tracheophytes
- Clade: Angiosperms
- Clade: Eudicots
- Clade: Rosids
- Order: Brassicales
- Family: Brassicaceae
- Genus: Caulanthus
- Species: C. major

Binomial name
- Caulanthus major (M.E.Jones) Payson

Species of flowering plant

Caulanthus major is a species of flowering plant in the family Brassicaceae known by the common name slender wild cabbage. It is native to the Great Basin and surrounding regions of the United States, where it grows on dry mountain slopes and similar habitat.

It is a perennial herb growing an erect, hollow stem from a woody caudex. It is most similar to its relative, Caulanthus crassicaulis. Leaves appear in a basal rosette about the stem and along the body of the stem, and are smooth, toothed, or deeply cut along the edges. The largest leaves are lowest on the stem and may reach 9 centimeters (3.5 in) long. The flower is enclosed in thick, sometimes hairy sepals which are very dark in color when new, usually a deep purple. The petals emerging from the tip are narrow and dark-veined. The fruit is a thin silique up to 13 centimeters (5.1 in) long.
