= Jewelflower =

The common name jewelflower may refer to plants in any of several genera in the mustard family, including:

- Caulanthus
- Streptanthus
