= Caulanthus barnebyi =

Conservation status
- Imperiled (NatureServe)

Scientific classification
- Kingdom: Plantae
- Clade: Tracheophytes
- Clade: Angiosperms
- Clade: Eudicots
- Clade: Rosids
- Order: Brassicales
- Family: Brassicaceae
- Genus: Caulanthus
- Species: C. barnebyi

Binomial name
- Caulanthus barnebyi Rollins & P.K.Holmgren

Species of flowering plant

Caulanthus barnebyi, the Black Rock wild cabbage, is a plant species endemic to a small region in the US State of Nevada. It is known only from the Black Rock Mountains in Humboldt and Pershing Counties in the northwestern part of the state. It grows on dry, rocky slopes and outcrops at elevations of 4,300–4,900 feet (1,300–1,500 m).

Caulanthus barnebyi is a glabrous, perennial herb up to 43 inches (110 cm) tall. It has basal leaves up to 6.3 inches (16 cm) long, plus smaller leaves higher up the stem. Flowers are in a dense raceme, with purple sepals and white petals.
