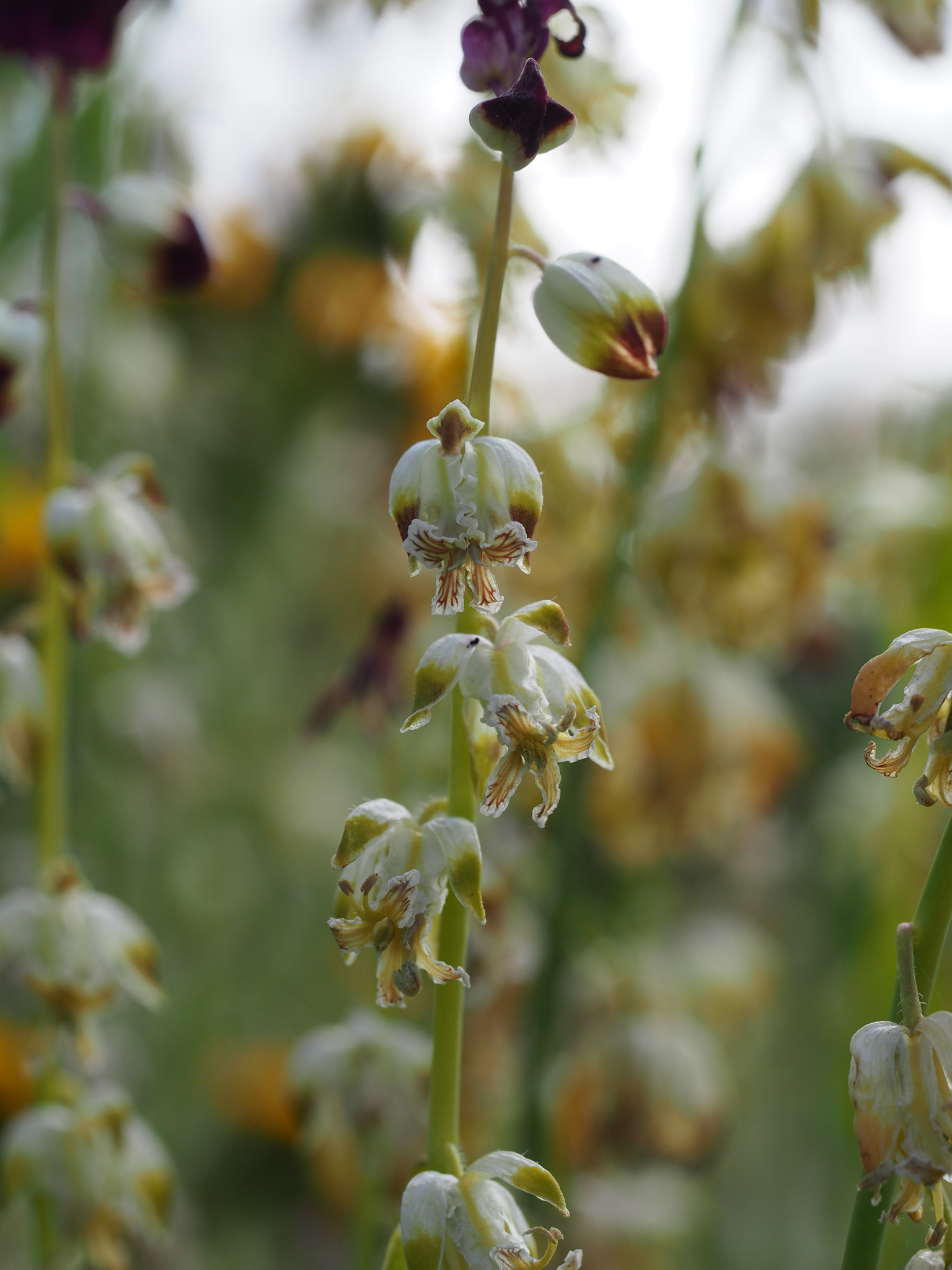

Conservation status
- Endangered (ESA)

Scientific classification
- Kingdom: Plantae
- Clade: Tracheophytes
- Clade: Angiosperms
- Clade: Eudicots
- Clade: Rosids
- Order: Brassicales
- Family: Brassicaceae
- Genus: Caulanthus
- Species: C. californicus

Binomial name
- Caulanthus californicus (S.Watson) Payson

Synonyms
- Stanfordia californica Streptanthus californicus

= Caulanthus californicus =

Species of flowering plant

Caulanthus californicus is a species of flowering plant in the family Brassicaceae known by the common names California jewelflower and St. Francis cabbage.

It is endemic to California, where it has been known only from the San Joaquin Valley and the adjacent eastern slopes of the Central Coast Ranges, including the Carrizo Plain and Cuyama Valley. Its range is dramatically decreased from its historical distribution, and the plant is a federally listed endangered species.

== Characteristics ==
This is an annual herb, producing an erect or spreading branched stem which is variable in height. The rounded or oval, toothed leaves are up to 10 centimeters (3.9 in) long and clasp the stem, mainly around the lower part. The inflorescence produces several rounded flowers, often only along one side of the stem. Each flower has pouched sepals which are dark purple when new and turn light green to white as the flower opens. The frilly petals inside are nearly white with purple veining. The fruit is a silique up to 6 centimeters (2.4 in) long.

== Range and habitat ==
This endangered plant once occurred across the San Joaquin Valley and well into the surrounding coastal and Transverse Ranges, as well as the Sierra Nevada foothills. As the Central Valley floor was converted to agriculture on a large scale, the plant was extirpated from there. It currently exists in three remaining areas: the Carrizo Plain, Santa Barbara Canyon in Santa Barbara County, and the Kreyenhagen Hills in Fresno County. There are 40 occurrences remaining; at least 33 known occurrences have been extirpated.

== Reasons for decline ==
Habitat destruction is the primary reason for this species' decline. Overgrazing, fertilizer overuse, urbanization, mineral extraction, and lack of scholarship coverage on the California jewelflower are the several threats to the flower's survival, causing loss of genetic diversity and adaptability. Urbanization across Bakersfield, Fresno, and the San Joaquin Valley have depleted almost all the population. Additionally, minimal data on the plant's overall distribution and genetic background contributes to the lack of rehabilitation, and restoration, and reintroduction initiatives.
