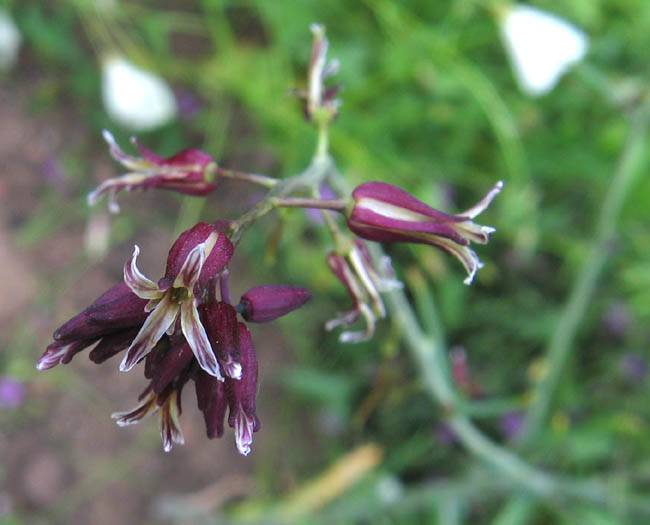

Scientific classification
- Kingdom: Plantae
- Clade: Tracheophytes
- Clade: Angiosperms
- Clade: Eudicots
- Clade: Rosids
- Order: Brassicales
- Family: Brassicaceae
- Genus: Caulanthus
- Species: C. heterophyllus

Binomial name
- Caulanthus heterophyllus (Nutt.) Payson

Synonyms
- Streptanthus heterophyllus

= Caulanthus heterophyllus =

Species of flowering plant

Caulanthus heterophyllus is a species of flowering plant in the family Brassicaceae known by the common names San Diego wild cabbage and San Diego jewelflower.

This annual wildflower is native to the coast ranges of southern California and Baja California. It is a member of the chaparral plant community and is common in areas recovering from wildfire.

== Description ==
This plant has a smooth, erect stem which may be thin or quite stout. The stem produces long, pointed leaves at intervals, and toward the top of the stem produces flowers at similar intervals. The point of the stem is occupied by an inflorescence of one to several flowers.

Each flower is showy, with a magenta to purple hollow urn-shaped body and a mouth surrounded by contrasting white petals which curl outward. The fruit is a silique several centimeters long containing winged seeds.
