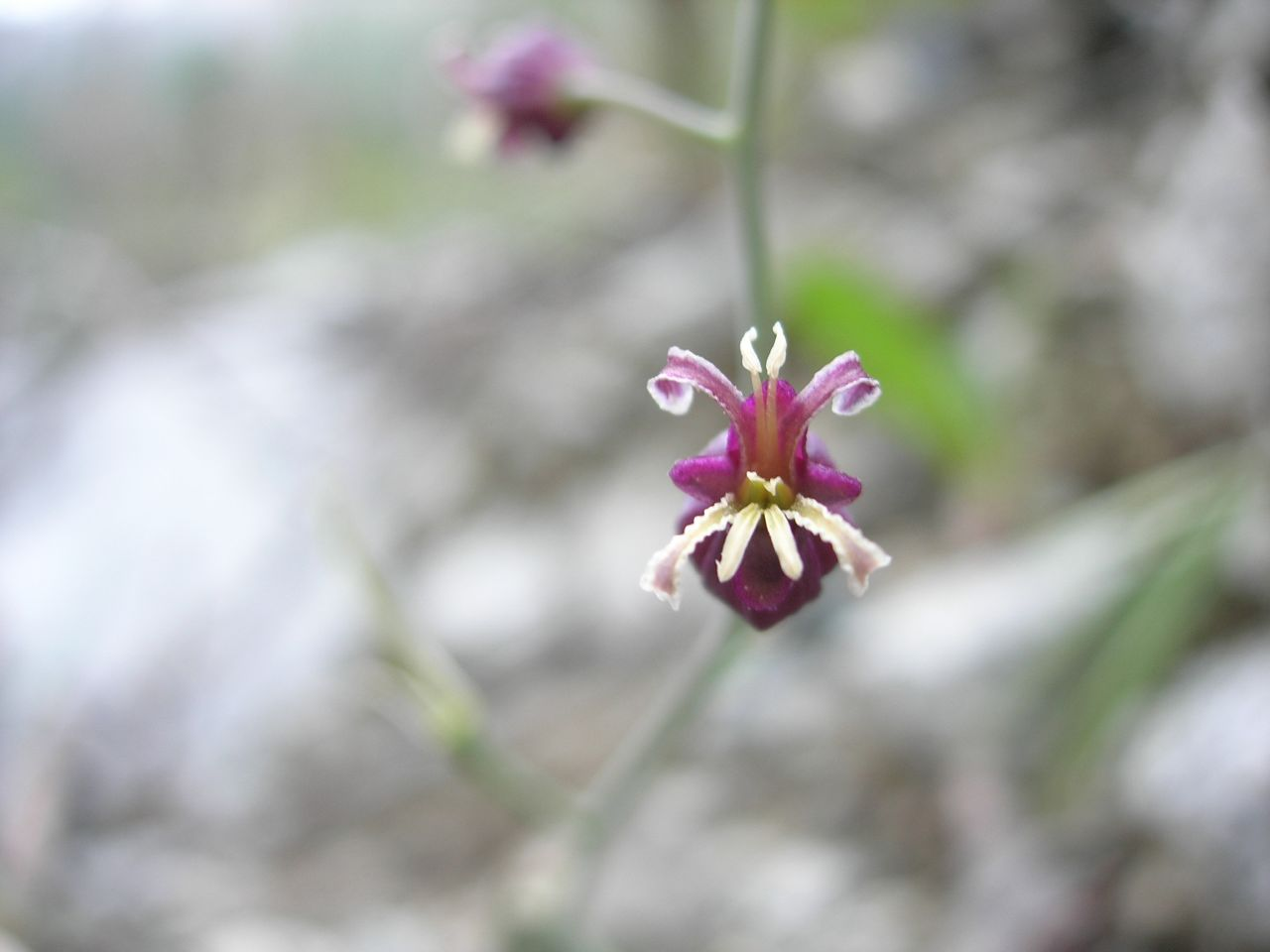

Scientific classification
- Kingdom: Plantae
- Clade: Tracheophytes
- Clade: Angiosperms
- Clade: Eudicots
- Clade: Rosids
- Order: Brassicales
- Family: Brassicaceae
- Genus: Caulanthus
- Species: C. amplexicaulis

Binomial name
- Caulanthus amplexicaulis S.Watson

= Caulanthus amplexicaulis =

Species of flowering plant

Caulanthus amplexicaulis is a species of flowering plant in the family Brassicaceae known by the common name claspingleaf wild cabbage.

It is endemic to California, where it grows on open slopes in the Transverse Ranges and Outer South California Coast Ranges.

== Description ==
Caulanthus amplexicaulis is an annual herb growing up to 44 inches (1.1 m) tall.

The bulbous purple flower forms a rounded pouch which opens at the top, with the narrow petal tips reflexed back. The outer petal tips are deep purple; the inner tips are much lighter and can be nearly white.

The fruit is a very long silique which may exceed 10 centimeters (3.9 in) in length.

=== Varieties ===
There are two varieties of this species.

- Caulanthus amplexicaulis var. barbarae – Santa Barbara jewelflower; endemic to the serpentine soils of the San Rafael Mountains in central Santa Barbara County. The sepals forming the rounded pouch of the flower are white to cream in color, as opposed to the bright purple of the more common variety.
- Caulanthus amplexicaulis var. amplexicaulis – endemic to the Transverse Ranges.

== See also ==
- California chaparral and woodlands – ecoregion.
- Flora of the California chaparral and woodlands
