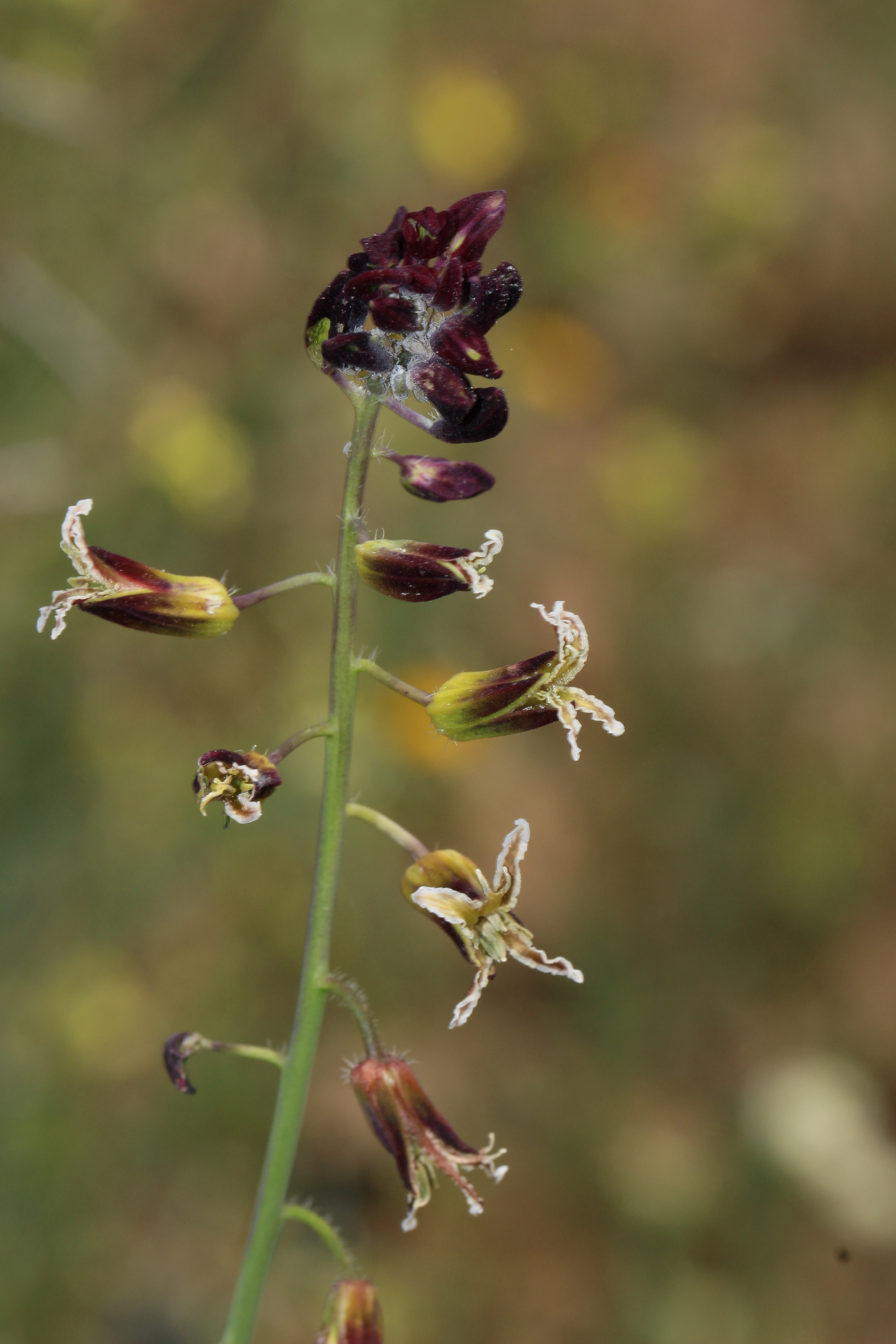

Conservation status
- Vulnerable (NatureServe)

Scientific classification
- Kingdom: Plantae
- Clade: Tracheophytes
- Clade: Angiosperms
- Clade: Eudicots
- Clade: Rosids
- Order: Brassicales
- Family: Brassicaceae
- Genus: Caulanthus
- Species: C. coulteri

Binomial name
- Caulanthus coulteri S.Watson

= Caulanthus coulteri =

Species of flowering plant

Caulanthus coulteri is a species of flowering plant in the family Brassicaceae known by the common name Coulter's wild cabbage.

It is endemic to California, where it is a widespread member of the flora in several dry, open habitat types, such as chaparral and Mojave Desert.

== Description ==
Caulanthus coulteri is a 100–1,600 millimeters (4–63 in) tall annual herb producing a slender, branching stem lined with generally lance-shaped leaves which may be smooth to sharply sawtoothed along the edges.

The widely spaced flowers are somewhat bullet-shaped with coats of pouched sepals which are bright to deep purple when new and fade to yellow-green. The sepals open to reveal dark-veined petal tips with wavy margins.

The fruit is a long, thin silique which may approach 13 centimeters 13 centimeters (5.1 in) in length.
