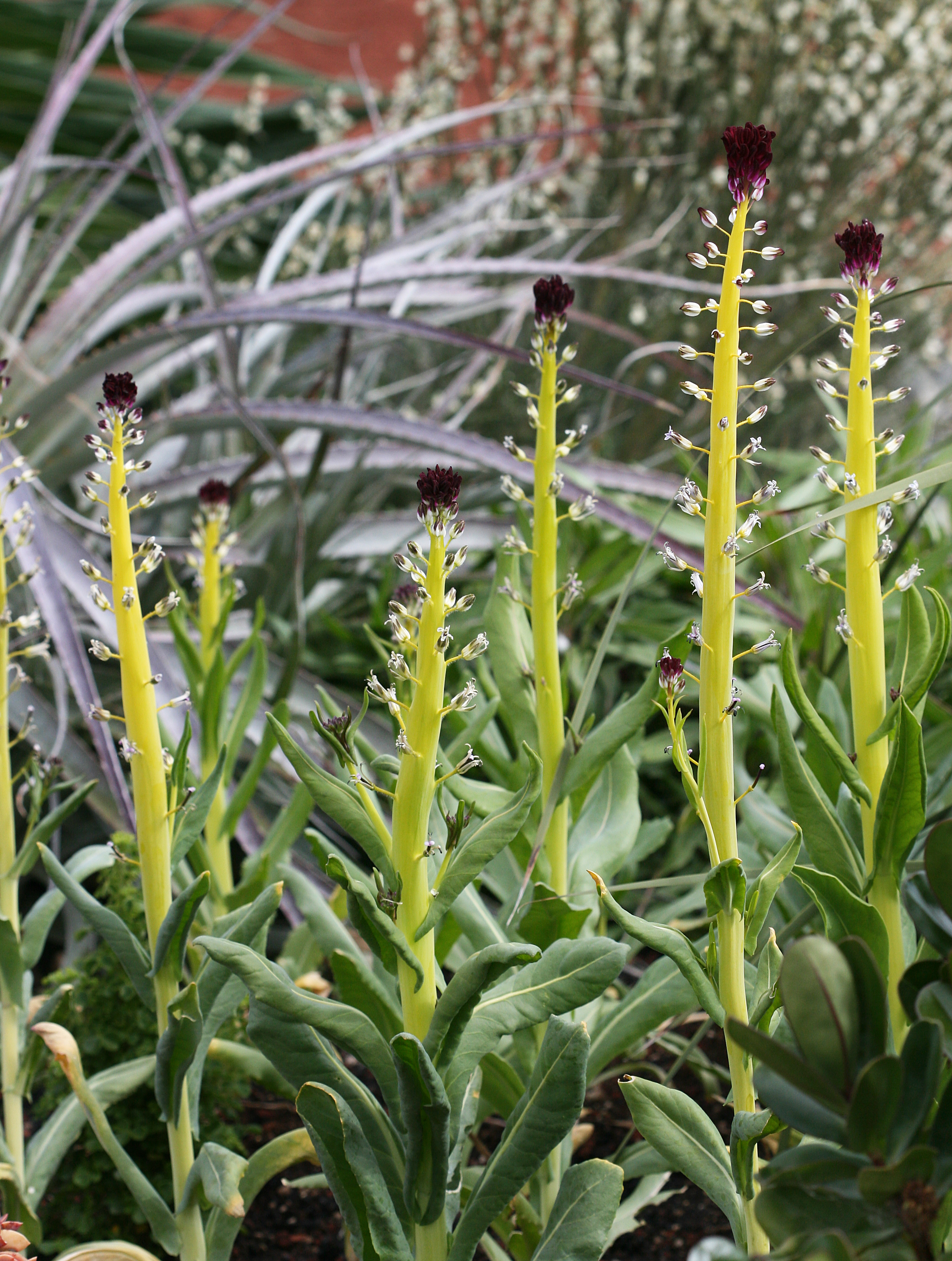

Conservation status
- Vulnerable (NatureServe)

Scientific classification
- Kingdom: Plantae
- Clade: Tracheophytes
- Clade: Angiosperms
- Clade: Eudicots
- Clade: Rosids
- Order: Brassicales
- Family: Brassicaceae
- Genus: Caulanthus
- Species: C. inflatus

Binomial name
- Caulanthus inflatus S.Watson

= Caulanthus inflatus =

Species of flowering plant

Caulanthus inflatus, the desert candle, also referred to as squaw cabbage, is a flowering plant in the family Brassicaceae, native to the Mojave Desert of California and Nevada, and the southern Sierra Nevada and Transverse Ranges in the United States. It is found at elevations between 150–1,500 metres (490–4,920 ft).

== Description ==
Caulanthus inflatus is an annual plant growing up to 70 cm (28 in) in height, with a thick, swollen, (ventricose) hollow stem that is "conspicuously inflated" with an unspecified gas, and looks like a yellow candle. The basal leaves are 2–7 cm (0.8–2.8 in) long, smaller higher up the stem. The flowers are small, with four reddish-purple petals. and six stamens.
