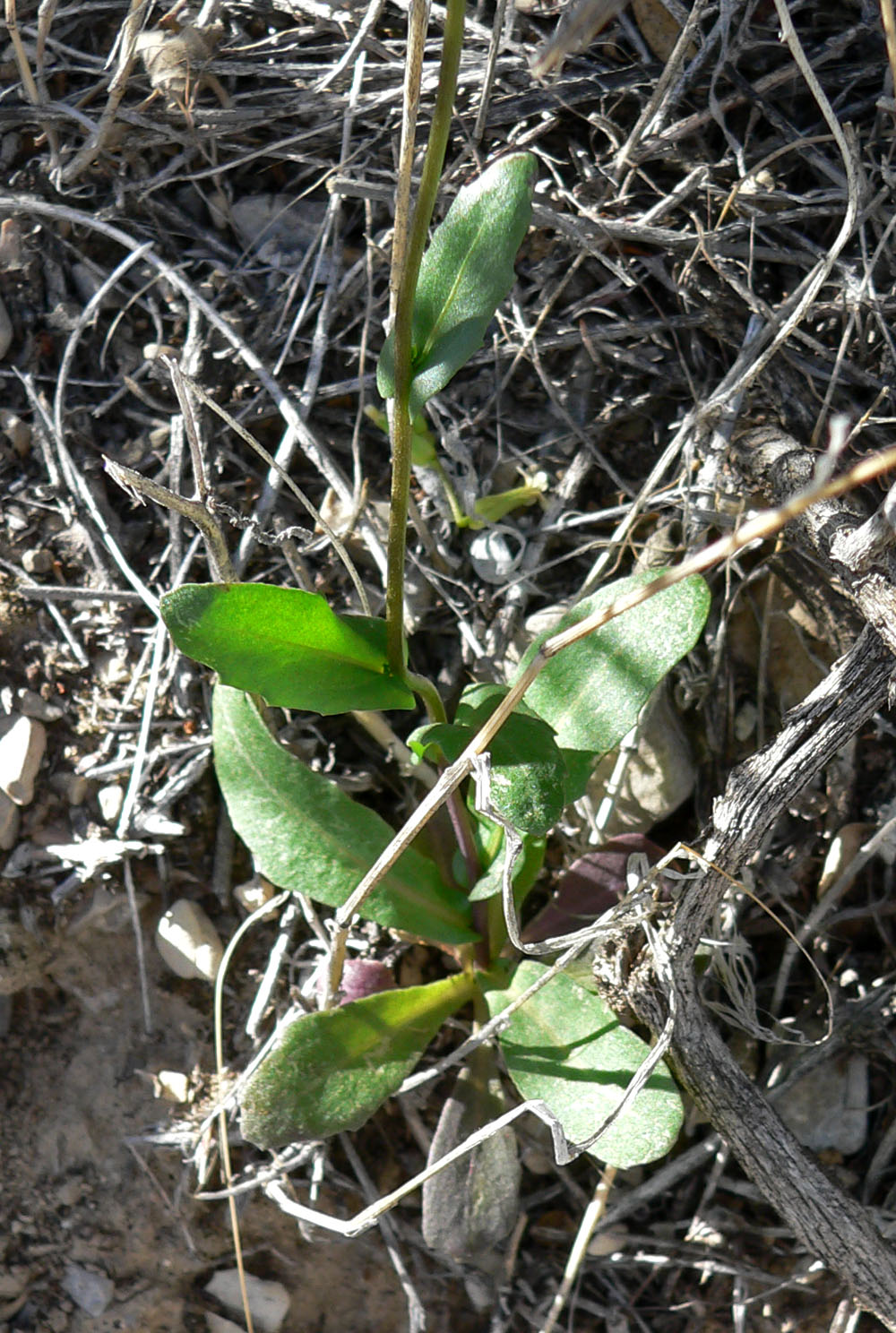

Conservation status
- Secure (NatureServe)

Scientific classification
- Kingdom: Plantae
- Clade: Tracheophytes
- Clade: Angiosperms
- Clade: Eudicots
- Clade: Rosids
- Order: Brassicales
- Family: Brassicaceae
- Genus: Caulanthus
- Species: C. cooperi

Binomial name
- Caulanthus cooperi (S.Watson) Payson

Synonyms
- Thelypodium cooperi S.Watson (basionym)

= Caulanthus cooperi =

Species of flowering plant

Caulanthus cooperi is a species of flowering plant in the family Brassicaceae known by the common name Cooper's wild cabbage. It is native to the southwestern United States and Baja California, where it is a common plant in a number of open, sandy habitats. This annual herb produces a slender, somewhat twisted stem with widely lance-shaped to oblong leaves clasping it. The flower has a rounded or urn-shaped coat of pinkish or pale greenish sepals enclosing light yellow or pale purple petals. The fruit is a straight or curving silique several centimeters long.
