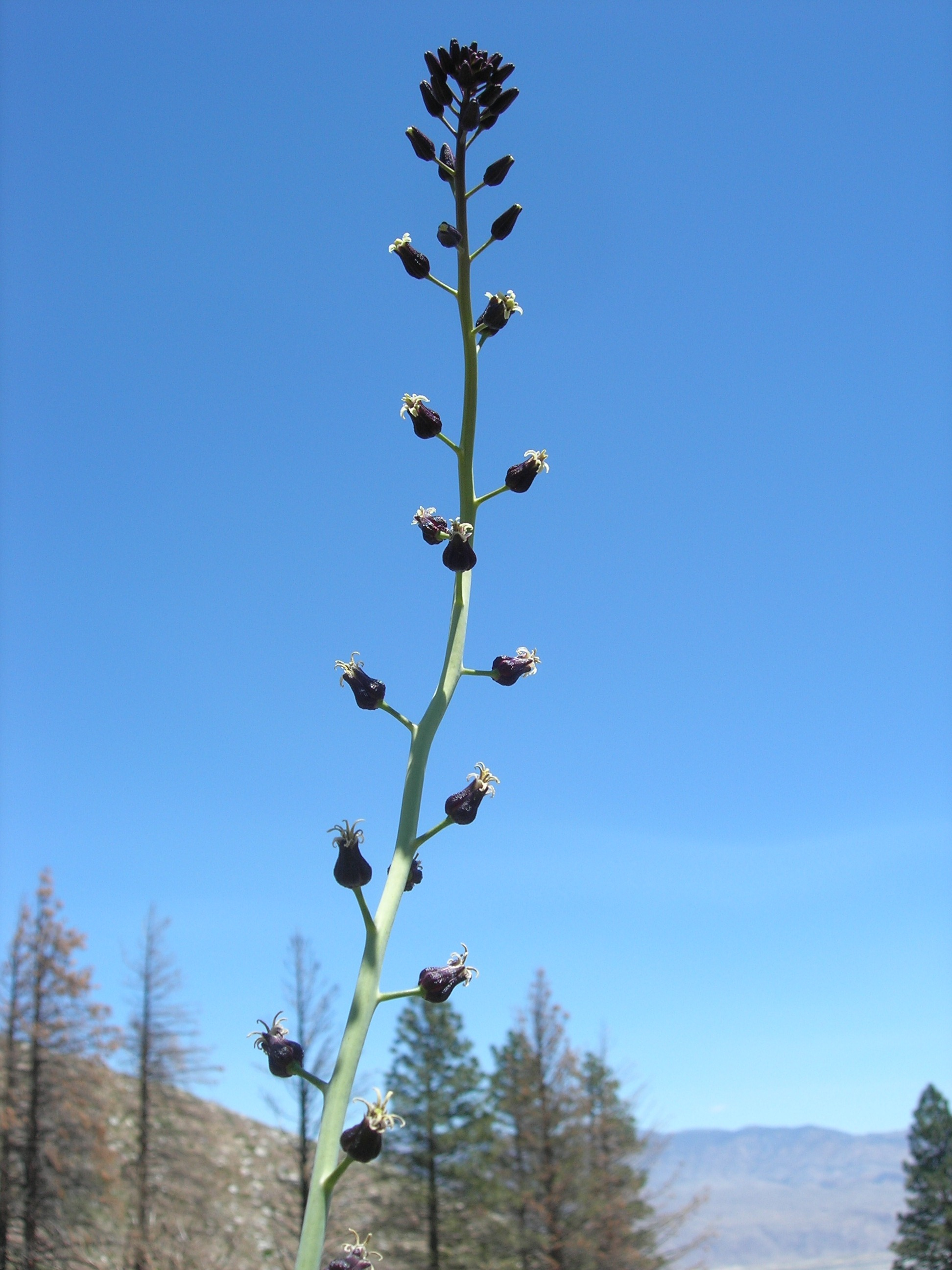

Scientific classification
- Kingdom: Plantae
- Clade: Tracheophytes
- Clade: Angiosperms
- Clade: Eudicots
- Clade: Rosids
- Order: Brassicales
- Family: Brassicaceae
- Genus: Caulanthus
- Species: C. pilosus

Binomial name
- Caulanthus pilosus S.Watson

= Caulanthus pilosus =

Species of flowering plant

Caulanthus pilosus is a species of flowering plant in the family Brassicaceae known by the common names hairy wild cabbage and chocolate drops. It is native to open, dry habitat in the Great Basin of Nevada, the Eastern slope of the Sierra Nevada to 9,000 ft (2,700 m) and surrounding regions of the United States northward to the SE corner of Oregon. It is an annual or occasionally perennial herb coated in thin hairs, especially toward the base.

== Description ==
Caulanthus pilosus may produce many stems per plant. The leaves are oblong in shape and deeply cut into lobes, hairy, and up to 25 cm (9.8 in) long. Leaves toward the top of the stem are reduced in size, sometimes linear and smooth-edged, lacking lobes. The flower is covered in thick sepals which are greenish purple to deep purple or chocolate brown, splitting to reveal the wavy-edged, light-colored petals inside. The top cluster of flowers on each stem are sterile. The fruit is a long, narrow, upward-curving silique which may approach 18 cm (7.1 in) long but is only 1–1.5mm wide.

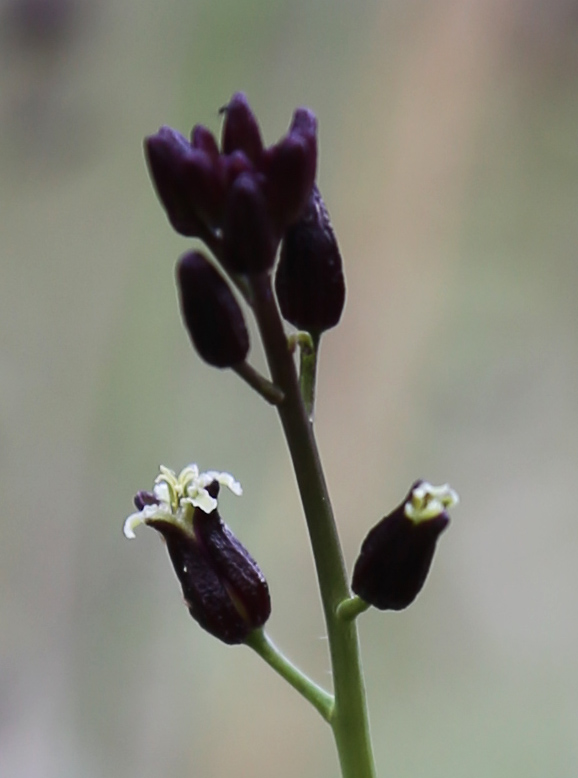
Caulanthus pilosus flowers close

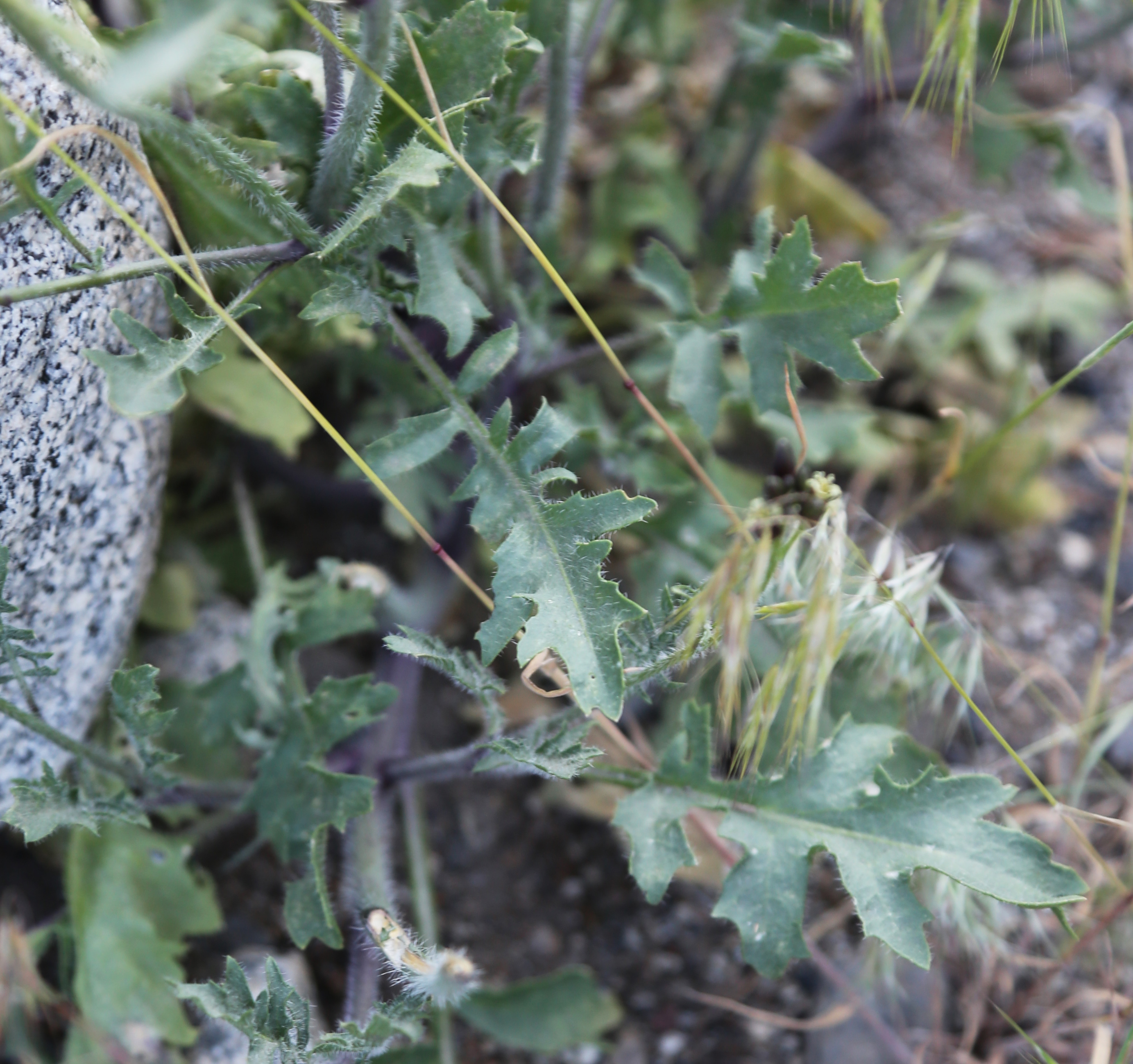
C. pilosus, hairy basal leaves and stem

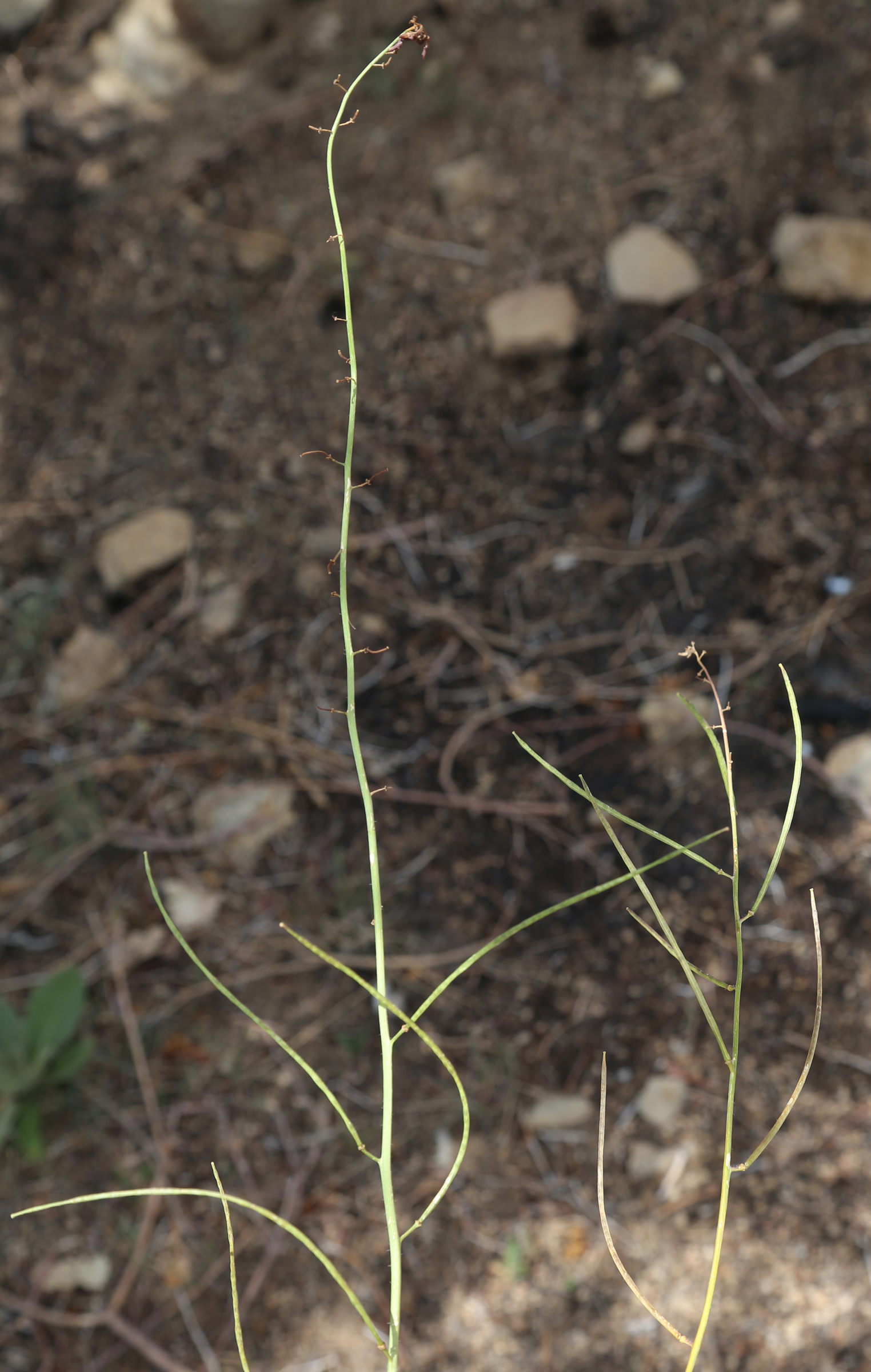
C. pilosus stems, with seedpods
