= Caulanthus hallii =

Conservation status
- Vulnerable (NatureServe)

Scientific classification
- Kingdom: Plantae
- Clade: Tracheophytes
- Clade: Angiosperms
- Clade: Eudicots
- Clade: Rosids
- Order: Brassicales
- Family: Brassicaceae
- Genus: Caulanthus
- Species: C. hallii

Binomial name
- Caulanthus hallii Payson

Species of flowering plant

Caulanthus hallii is a species of flowering plant in the family Brassicaceae known by the common name Hall's wild cabbage.

== Distribution and habitat ==
It is native to southern California and northern Baja California.

It grows in the Colorado Desert (western Sonoran Desert), Mojave Desert sky islands, and the dry eastern Peninsular Ranges slopes.

== Description ==
Caulanthus hallii is an annual herb producing a hollow stem fringed at the base with long, deeply cut leaves which are hairless or sometimes bristly.

The greenish yellow flower has a coat of hairy sepals over narrow, pale petals. The fruit is a silique up to about 11 centimeters (4.3 in) long.
