= Caulanthus simulans =

Scientific classification
- Kingdom: Plantae
- Clade: Tracheophytes
- Clade: Angiosperms
- Clade: Eudicots
- Clade: Rosids
- Order: Brassicales
- Family: Brassicaceae
- Genus: Caulanthus
- Species: C. simulans

Binomial name
- Caulanthus simulans Payson

Species of flowering plant

Caulanthus simulans is a species of flowering plant in the family Brassicaceae known by the common names Payson's wild cabbage and Payson's jewelflower. It is endemic to southern California, where it is known mainly from open, dry habitat in the hills and deserts of Riverside and San Diego Counties. It is a bristly annual herb with deeply cut leaves, the longest arranged in cluster around the base of the stem. The flower is covered in thick, purple-tinted greenish sepals which split to reveal narrow, pale yellow petals at the tip. The fruit is a silique up to 8 centimeters (3.1 in) long.
