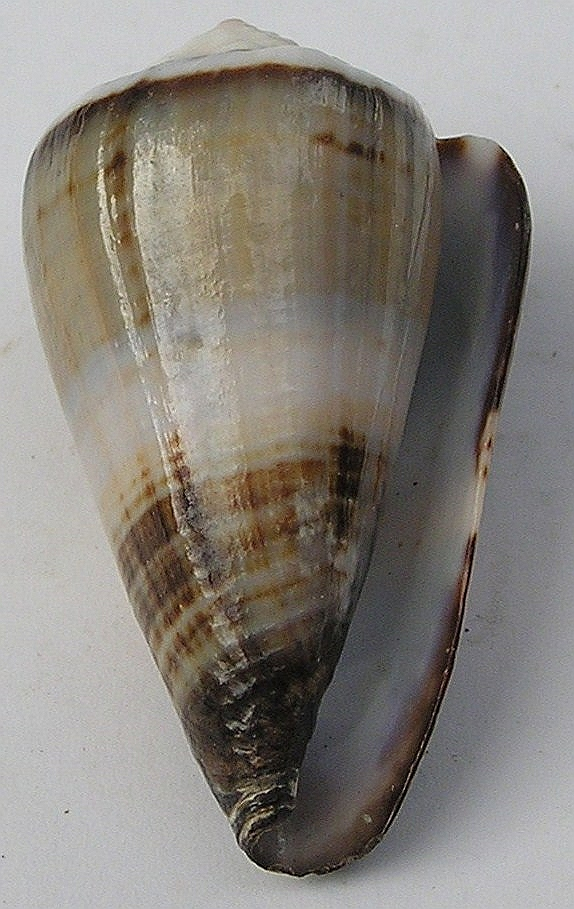
- Apertural view of Conus muriculatus

Conservation status
- Least Concern (IUCN 3.1)

Scientific classification
- Domain: Eukaryota
- Kingdom: Animalia
- Phylum: Mollusca
- Class: Gastropoda
- Subclass: Caenogastropoda
- Order: Neogastropoda
- Superfamily: Conoidea
- Family: Conidae
- Genus: Conus
- Species: C. muriculatus

Binomial name
- Conus muriculatus G. B. Sowerby I, 1833

Synonyms
- Conus muriculatus var. laevigata G. B. Sowerby I, 1833 (invalid: junior homonym of Conus laevigatus Link, 1807); Conus sugillatus Reeve, 1843; Conus (Kermasprella) muriculatus laevigata (f) Sowerby, G.B. I & II, 1833; Conus (Lividoconus) muriculatus G. B. Sowerby I, 1833 · accepted, alternate representation; Lividoconus muriculatus G. B. Sowerby I, 1833

= Conus muriculatus =

Species of sea snail

Conus muriculatus, common name the muricate cone, is a species of sea snail, a marine gastropod mollusk in the family Conidae, the cone snails and their allies.

Like all species within the genus Conus, these snails are predatory and venomous. They are capable of stinging humans, therefore live ones should be handled carefully or not at all.

== Description ==
The size of an adult shell varies between 15 mm and 50 mm. The solid shell has straight sides, and a short conical spire. The shoulder is sharply angulated and tuberculated. The body whorl is strongly striate towards the base, encircled throughout with lines of granules. The color of the shell is white, violet-tinged towards the base, with two light chestnut or yellowish brown, broad, irregular and somewhat indistinct bands.

== Distribution ==
This species occurs in the Indian Ocean off Madagascar, the Mascarene Basin to Western Australia; in the Pacific Ocean from Japan to New Caledonia, Fiji, the Solomon Islands, Tonga, Vanuatu and French Polynesia; off Australia (New South Wales, Queensland).

== Gallery ==
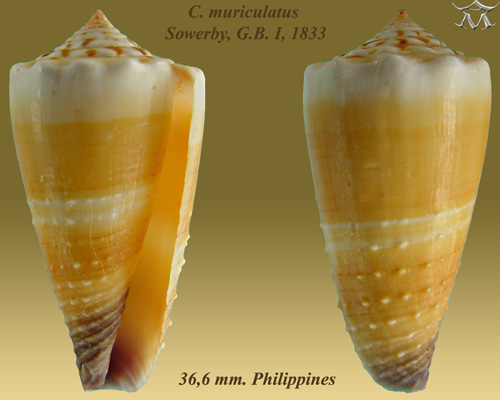
Conus muriculatus Sowerby, G.B. I, 1833

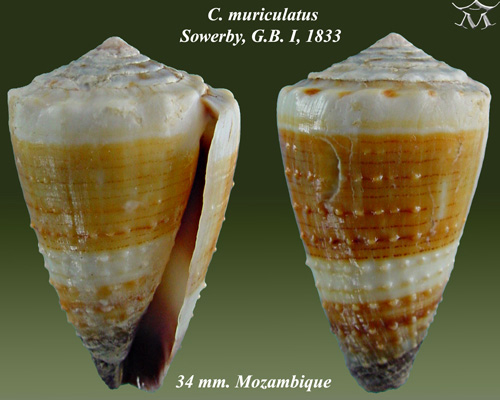
Conus muriculatus Sowerby, G.B. I, 1833
