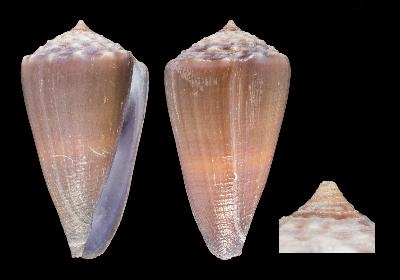
- Shell of Conus conco (holotype at MNHN, Paris)

Scientific classification
- Kingdom: Animalia
- Phylum: Mollusca
- Class: Gastropoda
- Subclass: Caenogastropoda
- Order: Neogastropoda
- Superfamily: Conoidea
- Family: Conidae
- Genus: Conus
- Species: C. conco

Binomial name
- Conus conco Puillandre, Stöcklin, Favreau, Bianchi, Perret, Rivasseau, Limpalaër, Monnier & Bouchet, 2015

Synonyms
- Lividoconus conco (Puillandre, Stöcklin, Favreau, Bianchi, Perret, Rivasseau, Limpalaër, Monnier & Bouchet, 2015 )

= Conus conco =

Species of sea snail

Conus conco is a species of sea snail, a marine gastropod mollusc in the family Conidae, the cone snails, cone shells or cones.

These snails are predatory and have venomous stingers.

== Nomenclature ==
The description of Conus conco was included in the online Supplementary Material to the article by Puillandre et al. (2014). This description was not included in the printed version of the article, and thus did not meet the requirements of the International Code of Zoological Nomenclature (ICZN) for electronic publications, and the name Conus conco Puillandre et al., 2014, was not a nomenclaturally available name. To meet the ICZN requirements and make the name Conus conco available, the description was published in January 2015 as a standard print part of Molecular Phylogenetics and Evolution.

== Description ==
The size of the shell attains varies from 37.4 mm to 56.8 mm. The last whorl is conical, with a low spire and strongly tuberculated shoulder. The number of tubercles on the last whorl varies from 10 to 11. The protoconch was eroded in all studied specimens and thus the number of its whorls is unknown. It is deep pink in color from observation of the best preserved ones. Adult shells had 11–12 teleoconch whorls. The outline of the spire is straight with a pointed apex. There are up to six irregular shallow spiral striae at the sutural ramp. The last whorl is very slightly convex in the upper part and straight below.

== Distribution ==
This species occurs in the Pacific Ocean off the Marquesas Islands.
