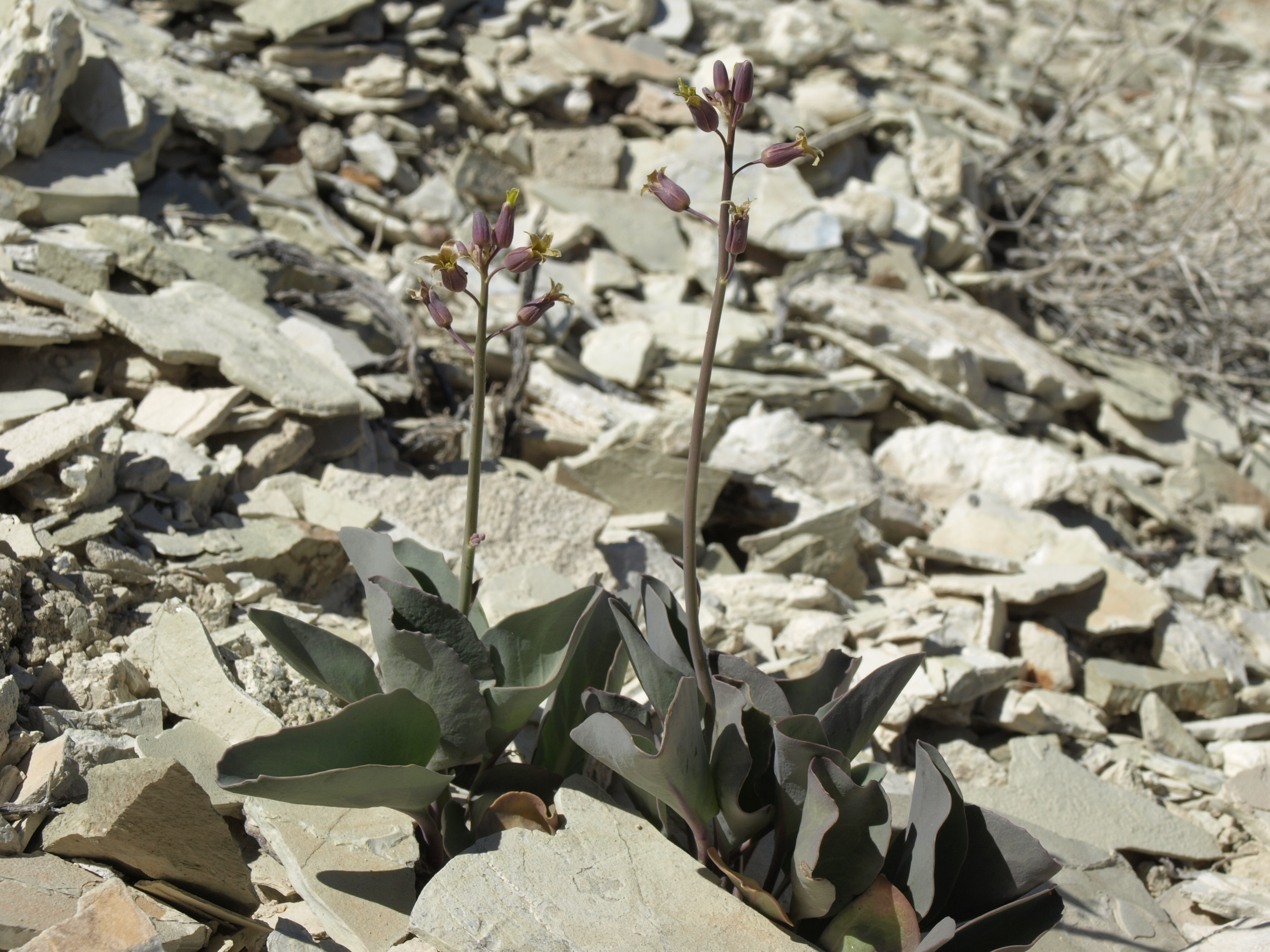

Conservation status
- Vulnerable (NatureServe)

Scientific classification
- Kingdom: Plantae
- Clade: Tracheophytes
- Clade: Angiosperms
- Clade: Eudicots
- Clade: Rosids
- Order: Brassicales
- Family: Brassicaceae
- Genus: Caulanthus
- Species: C. glaucus

Binomial name
- Caulanthus glaucus S.Watson

Synonyms
- Streptanthus glaucus (S.Watson) Jeps.

= Caulanthus glaucus =

Species of flowering plant

Caulanthus glaucus is a species of flowering plant in the family Brassicaceae known by the common names glaucous wild cabbage, bigleaf wildcabbage, and limestone jewelflower.

It is native to southern Nevada and adjacent parts of eastern California and Mojave Desert sky islands, where it grows in open, rocky habitat in the desert mountains.

== Description ==
Caulanthus glaucus is a perennial herb producing a slender, branching stem from a woody caudex.

The largest of the leaves appear in a cluster at the base of the plant, and are oblong or oval and up to 10 centimeters (3.9 in) long. Smaller, lance-shaped leaves appear higher up on the stem.

The flower has a coat of thick green sepals over narrow yellowish or purplish petals. The fruit is a long, thin silique which may approach 15 centimeters (5.9 in) in length.
