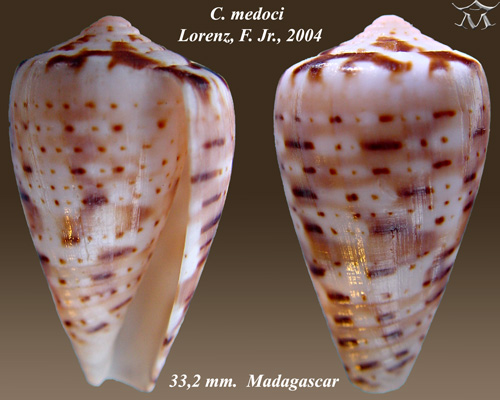
- Apertural and abapertural views of shell of Conus medoci Lorenz, F. Jr., 2004
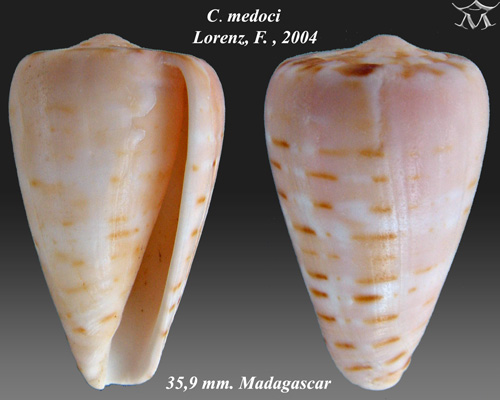

Conservation status
- Least Concern (IUCN 3.1)

Scientific classification
- Kingdom: Animalia
- Phylum: Mollusca
- Class: Gastropoda
- Subclass: Caenogastropoda
- Order: Neogastropoda
- Superfamily: Conoidea
- Family: Conidae
- Genus: Conus
- Species: C. medoci

Binomial name
- Conus medoci Lorenz, 2004

Synonyms
- Conus (Dendroconus) medoci Lorenz, 2004 · accepted, alternate representation; Dendroconus medoci (Lorenz, 2004)

= Conus medoci =

Species of sea snail

Conus medoci is a species of sea snail, a marine gastropod mollusk in the family Conidae, the cone snails and their allies.

Like all species within the genus Conus, these snails are predatory and venomous. They are capable of stinging humans, therefore live ones should be handled carefully or not at all.

== Description ==
The size of the shell varies between 53 mm and 76 mm.

== Distribution ==
This marine species occurs off Southern Madagascar.
