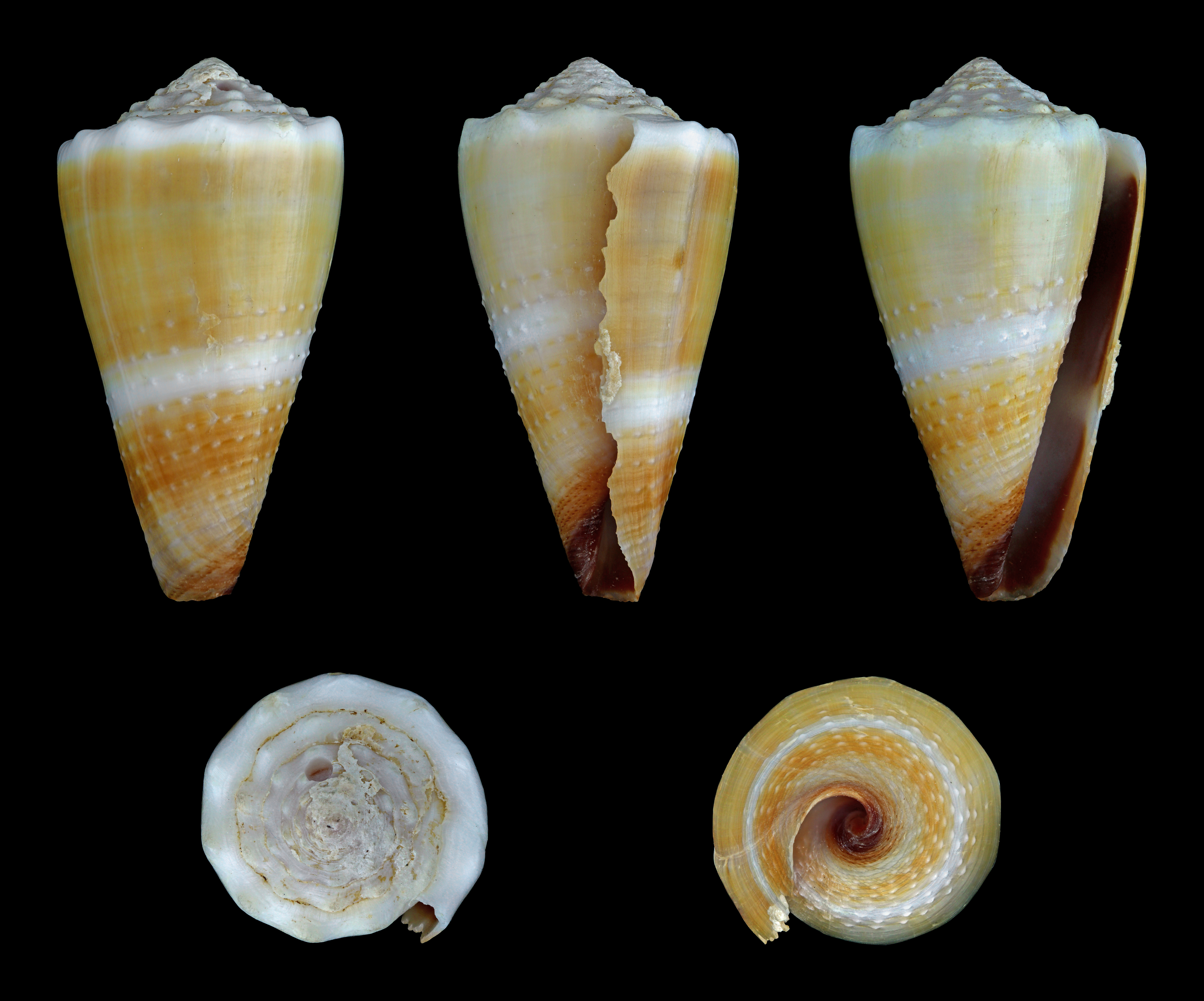
- Five views of shell of Conus lividus Hwass in Bruguière, J.G., 1792

Conservation status
- Least Concern (IUCN 3.1)

Scientific classification
- Kingdom: Animalia
- Phylum: Mollusca
- Class: Gastropoda
- Subclass: Caenogastropoda
- Order: Neogastropoda
- Superfamily: Conoidea
- Family: Conidae
- Genus: Conus
- Species: C. lividus

Binomial name
- Conus lividus Hwass in Bruguiere, 1792

Synonyms
- Conus (Lividoconus) lividus Hwass in Bruguière, 1792 · accepted, alternate representation; Conus detritus Menke, K.T., 1830; Conus lividus var. detritus Menke, 1830; Conus plebejus Link, 1807; Conus primula Reeve, 1849; Conus virgo fasciata (f) Menke, K.T., 1828 (invalid: junior homonym of Conus fasciatus Schröter, 1803, and several others); Cucullus monachos Röding, 1798; Lividoconus lividus (Hwass in Bruguière, 1792)

= Conus lividus =

Species of sea snail

Conus lividus, common name the livid cone, is a species of sophisticated predatory sea snails, marine gastropod molluscs in the family Conidae, the cone snails, cone shells or cones.

Like all species within the genus Conus, these snails are predatory and venomous. They are capable of stinging humans, therefore live ones should be handled carefully or not at all.

== Description ==
The size of an adult shell varies between 25 mm and 81 mm. The moderate spire is coronated, depressed conical. It shows prominent nodules on shoulders of the whorls. The lower half of the body whorl is distantly striated, and the striae sparsely granulous. The color of the shell is light yellowish or fawn, olivaceous to orange-brown. The tubercles of the spire and a band below the shoulder, as well as a single central band on the body whorl, are white. The aperture is narrow and purple with faint central, white band. The base and the interior are violaceous. The epidermis is somewhat tufted in distant revolving series.

== Distribution ==
This cone snail has a very wide distribution. It is found in the Red Sea, in the Indian Ocean off Aldabra, Chagos, Mascarene Basin, Mauritius, Mozambique, Tanzania and the West Coast of South Africa; in the entire Pacific Ocean.; off Australia (New South Wales, Northern Territory, Queensland, Western Australia).

== Habitat ==
This species can be found around rocks and coral reefs in shallow water.

== Gallery ==
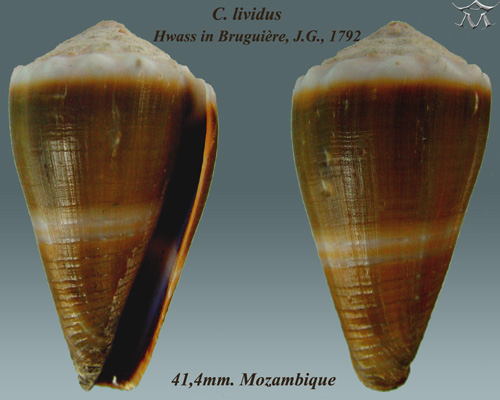
Conus lividus Hwass in Bruguière, J.G., 1792

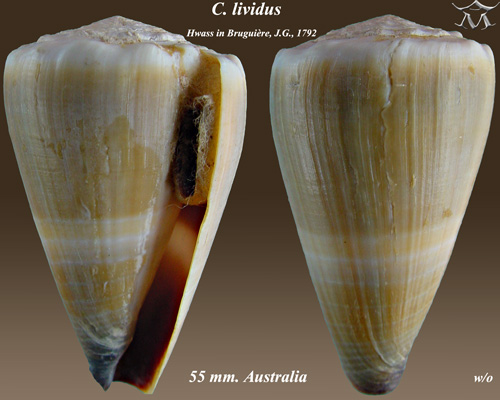
Conus lividus Hwass in Bruguière, J.G., 1792

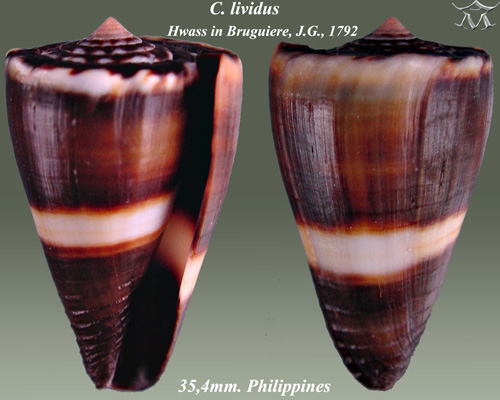
Conus lividus Hwass in Bruguière, J.G., 1792

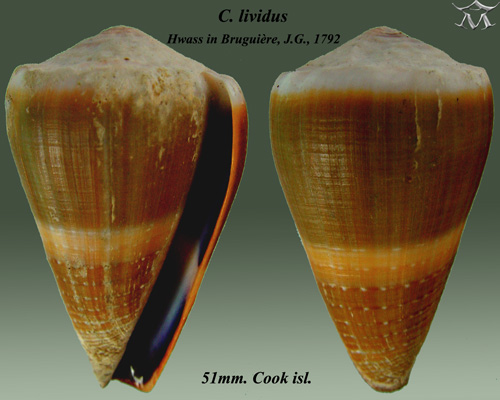
Conus lividus Hwass in Bruguière, J.G., 1792
