= Conus royaikeni =

Scientific classification
- Domain: Eukaryota
- Kingdom: Animalia
- Phylum: Mollusca
- Class: Gastropoda
- Subclass: Caenogastropoda
- Order: Neogastropoda
- Superfamily: Conoidea
- Family: Conidae
- Genus: Conus
- Species: C. royaikeni

Binomial name
- Conus royaikeni (S. G. Veldsman, 2010)

Synonyms
- Conus (Leptoconus) royaikeni (S. G. Veldsman, 2010) · accepted, alternate representation; Dendroconus royaikeni S. G. Veldsman, 2010 (original combination); Nataliconus royaikeni (S. G. Veldsman, 2010)

Species of sea snail

Conus royaikeni is a species of sea snail, a marine gastropod mollusc in the family Conidae, the cone snails, cone shells or cones.

These snails are predatory and venomous. They are capable of stinging humans.

== Description ==
The size of the shell attains 51 mm.

== Distribution ==
This marine species occurs off KwaZulu-Natal, South Africa
