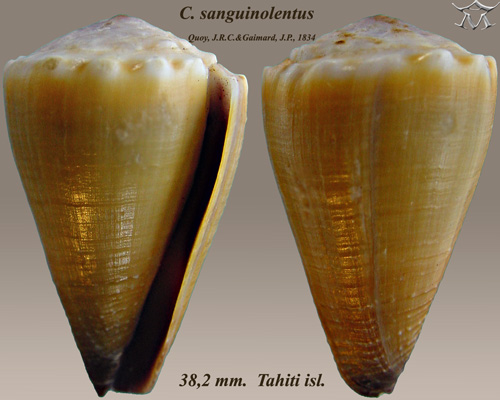
- Apertural and abapertural views of shell of Conus sanguinolentus Quoy, J.R.C. & Gaimard, J.P., 1834
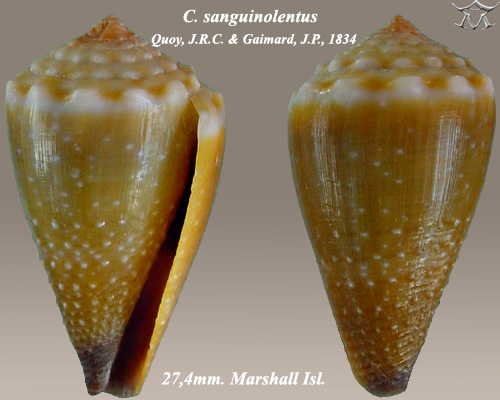

Conservation status
- Least Concern (IUCN 3.1)

Scientific classification
- Kingdom: Animalia
- Phylum: Mollusca
- Class: Gastropoda
- Subclass: Caenogastropoda
- Order: Neogastropoda
- Superfamily: Conoidea
- Family: Conidae
- Genus: Conus
- Species: C. sanguinolentus

Binomial name
- Conus sanguinolentus Quoy & Gaimard, 1834

Synonyms
- Conus (Lividoconus) sanguinolentus Quoy & Gaimard, 1834 · accepted, alternate representation; Lividoconus sanguinolentus (Quoy & Gaimard, 1834); Virgiconus sanguinolentus (Quoy & Gaimard, 1834)

= Conus sanguinolentus =

Species of sea snail

Conus sanguinolentus, common name the blood-stained cone, is a species of sea snail, a marine gastropod mollusk in the family Conidae, the cone snails and their allies.

These snails are predatory and venomous. They are capable of stinging humans, therefore live ones should be handled carefully or not at all.

== Description ==
The size of the shell varies between 22 mm and 65 mm. The shell has a pinkish white color. it is rather narrow with continuous but almost obsolete, longitudinal striae with chestnut.

== Distribution ==
This marine species occurs in the Red Sea, in the Indian Ocean off South Africa, Aldabra and the Mascarene Islands; off Indo-China, Indo-Malaysia; in the Western Pacific and off Australia (Northern Territory, Queensland and Western Australia).
