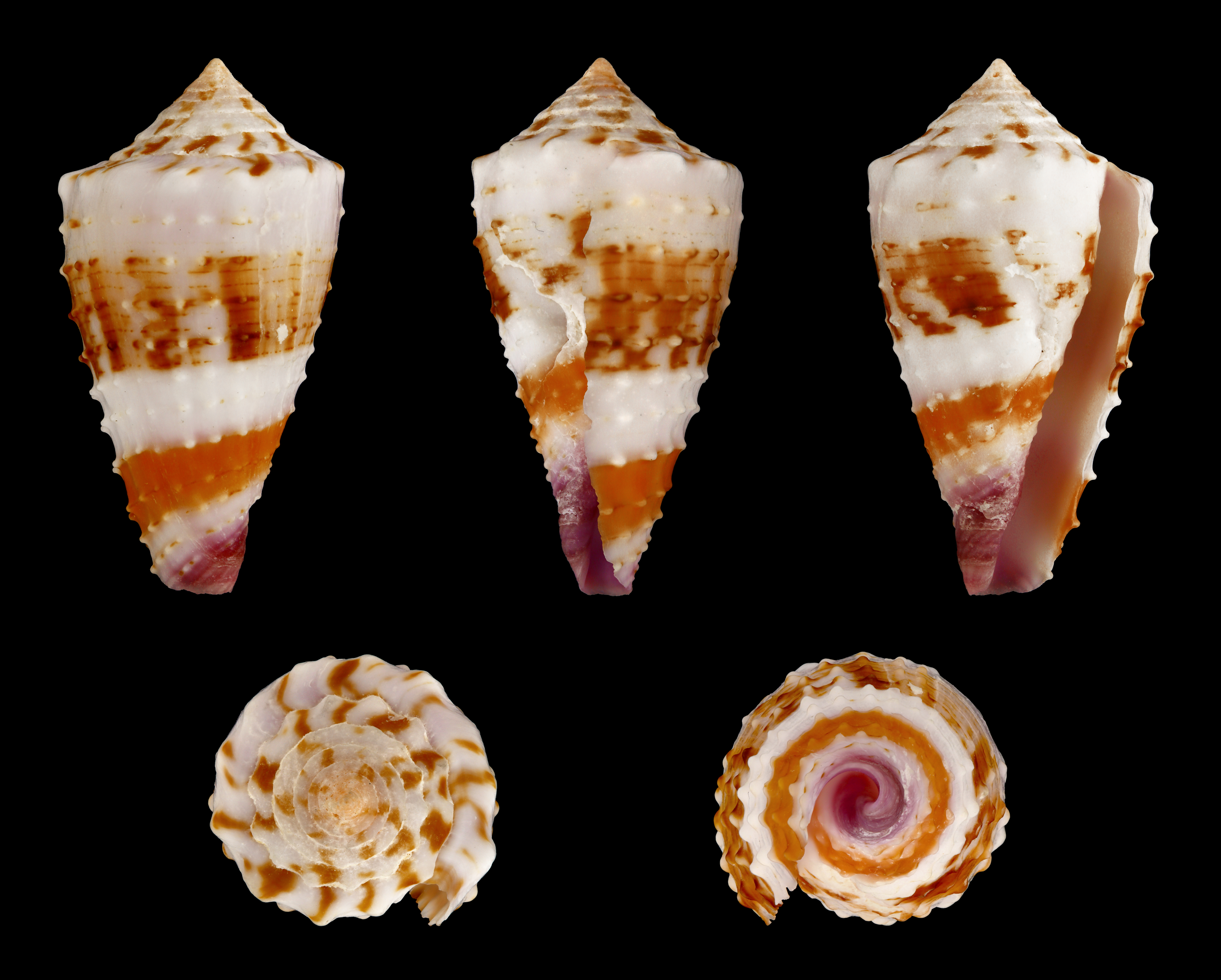
- Five views of a shell of the granulose form of Conus floridulus Adams, A. & Reeve, L.A., 1848

Conservation status
- Least Concern (IUCN 3.1)

Scientific classification
- Kingdom: Animalia
- Phylum: Mollusca
- Class: Gastropoda
- Subclass: Caenogastropoda
- Order: Neogastropoda
- Superfamily: Conoidea
- Family: Conidae
- Genus: Conus
- Species: C. floridulus

Binomial name
- Conus floridulus A. Adams & Reeve, 1848

Synonyms
- Conus (Lividoconus) floridulus A. Adams & Reeve, 1848 · accepted, alternate representation; Conus tenuis G. B. Sowerby II, 1857 (invalid: junior homonym of Conus tenuis G.B. Sowerby I, 1833); Lividoconus floridulus (A. Adams & Reeve, 1848)

= Conus floridulus =

Species of sea snail

Conus floridulus is a species of sea snail, a marine gastropod mollusk in the family Conidae, the cone snails and their allies.

Like all species within the genus Conus, these snails are predatory and venomous. They are capable of stinging humans, therefore live ones should be handled carefully or not at all.

== Description ==
The size of the shell varies between 22 mm and 59 mm. The rosy white shell shows two continuous bands of irregular longitudinal light chestnut blotches. The base is violet-tinted.

== Distribution ==
This marine species occurs off the Philippines and in the Gulf of Papua.

== Gallery ==
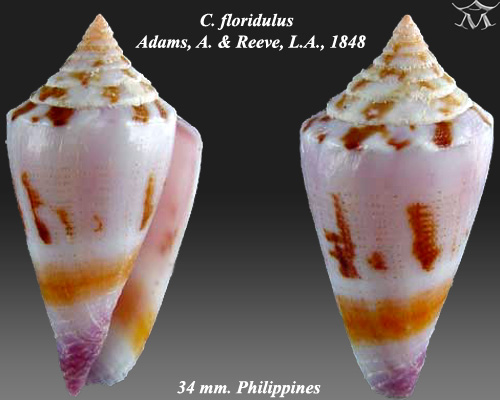
Conus floridulus Adams, A. & Reeve, L.A., 1848

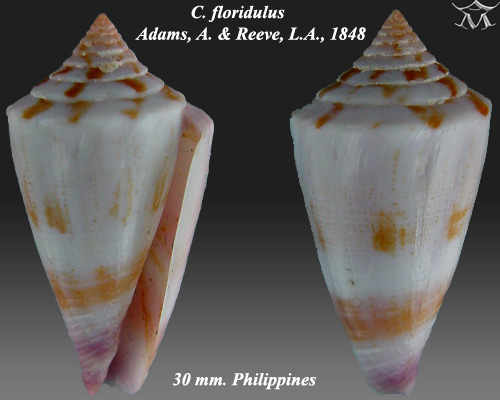
Conus floridulus Adams, A. & Reeve, L.A., 1848

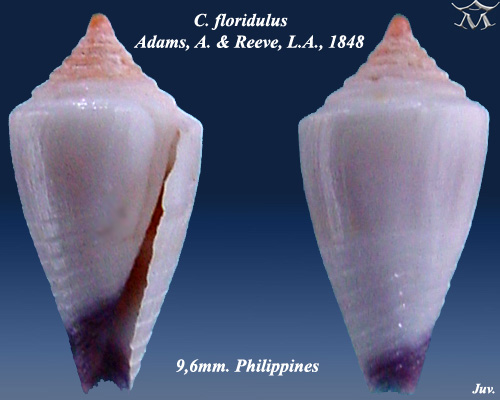
Conus floridulus Adams, A. & Reeve, L.A., 1848 (juv.)

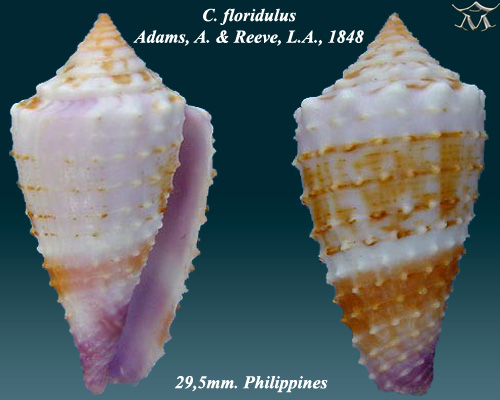
Conus floridulus Adams, A. & Reeve, L.A., 1848, granulose form
