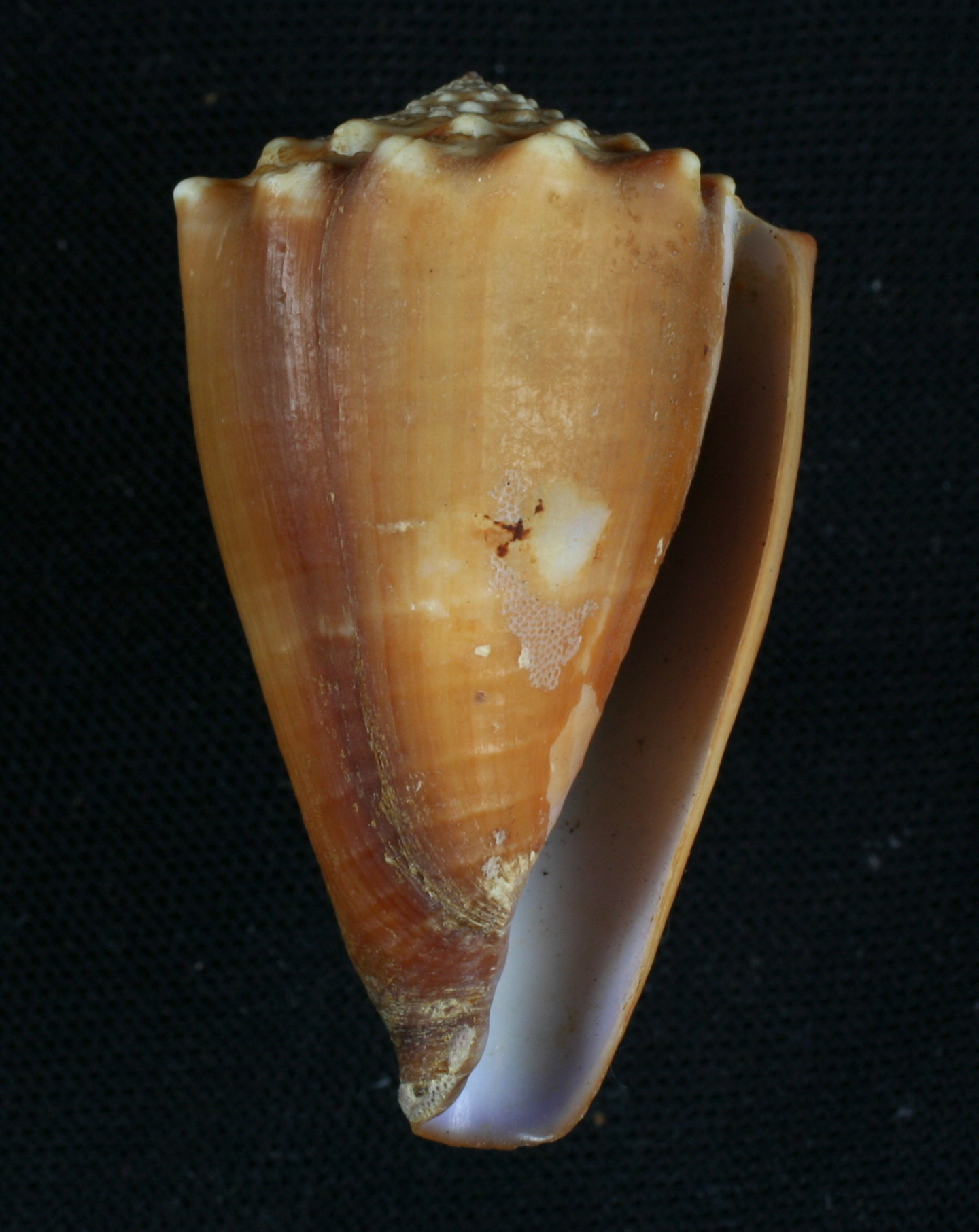
- Apertural view of shell of Conus diadema G.B. Sowerby I, 1834, measuring 44.5 mm in height, collected at 20 ft. off west side of Ceralbo Island, in Mexico.

Conservation status
- Least Concern (IUCN 3.1)

Scientific classification
- Kingdom: Animalia
- Phylum: Mollusca
- Class: Gastropoda
- Subclass: Caenogastropoda
- Order: Neogastropoda
- Superfamily: Conoidea
- Family: Conidae
- Genus: Conus
- Species: C. diadema

Binomial name
- Conus diadema G. B. Sowerby I, 1834

Synonyms
- Conus (Lividoconus) diadema G. B. Sowerby I, 1834 · accepted, alternate representation; Conus prytanis G. B. Sowerby III, 1882; Lividoconus diadema (G. B. Sowerby I, 1834)

= Conus diadema =

Species of sea snail

Conus diadema, common name the diadem cone, is a species of sea snail, a marine gastropod mollusk in the family Conidae, the cone snails and their allies.

Like all species within the genus Conus, these snails are predatory and venomous. They are capable of stinging humans, therefore live ones should be handled carefully or not at all.

== Description ==
The size of the shell varies between 25 mm and 60 mm. The short spire is conical and tuberculate. The color of the shell is uniformly brown, lineated with chocolate, with sometimes longitudinal white maculations forming a broad central interrupted band, and a few additional maculations on other portions of the surface. The base of the shell is subgranularly striate.

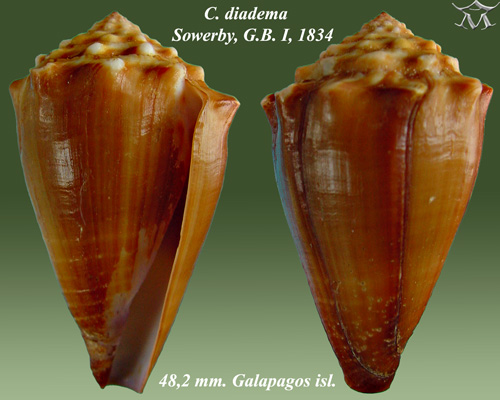
Conus diadema Sowerby, G.B. I, 1834

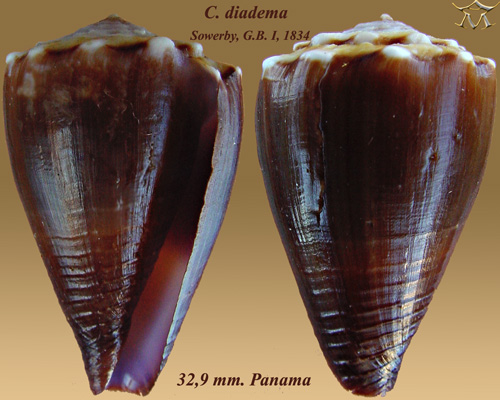
Conus diadema Sowerby, G.B. I, 1834

== Distribution ==
This marine species occurs in the Gulf of California, Western Mexico to Panama; off the Galápagos Islands.
