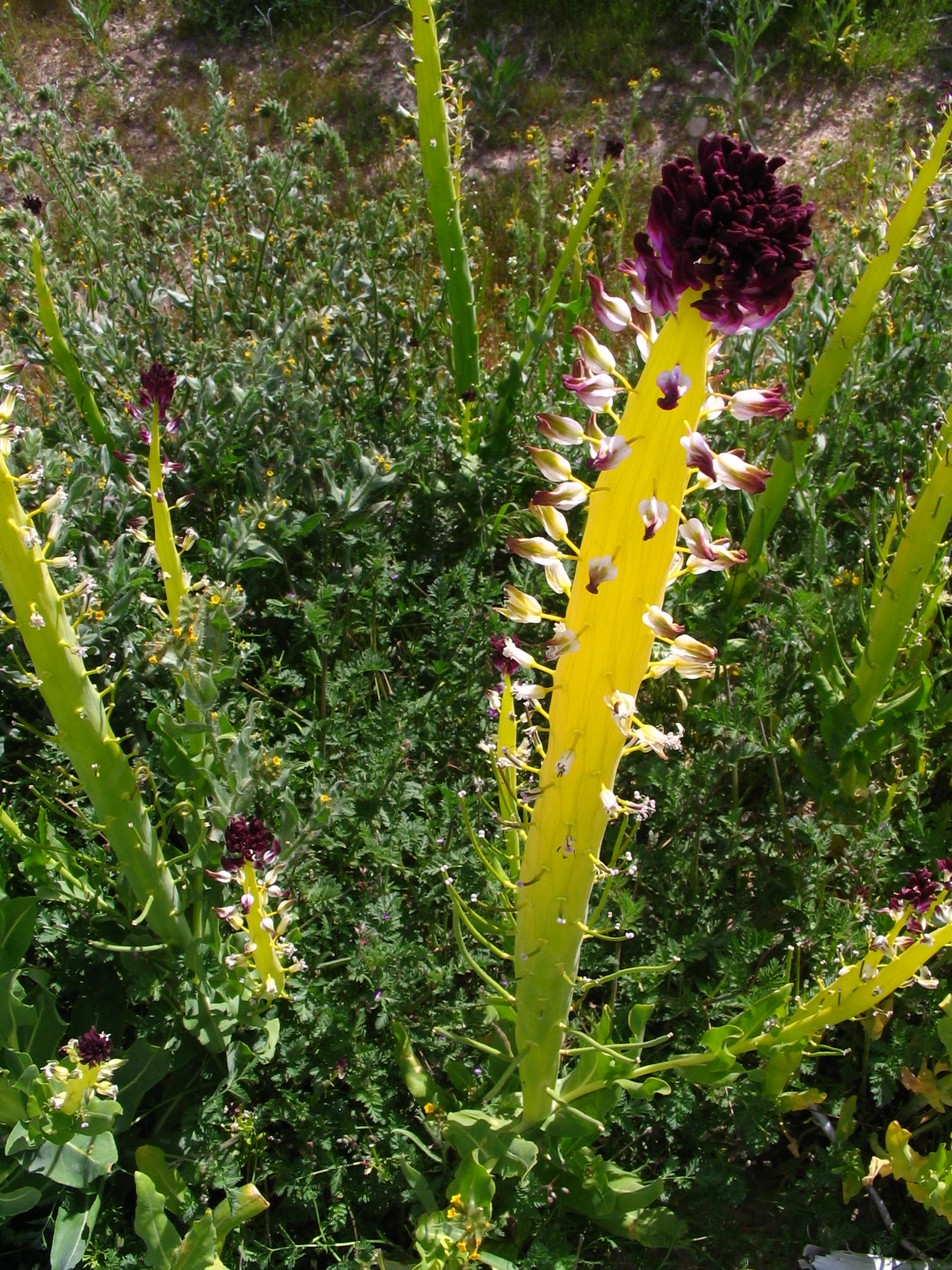
- Caulanthus inflatus

Scientific classification
- Kingdom: Plantae
- Clade: Tracheophytes
- Clade: Angiosperms
- Clade: Eudicots
- Clade: Rosids
- Order: Brassicales
- Family: Brassicaceae
- Genus: Caulanthus; S.Wats.

Species
- ~14 - See text

= Caulanthus =

Genus of flowering plants

Caulanthus is a genus of plants in the family Brassicaceae. Plants of this genus may be known as jewelflowers. They are also often referred to as wild cabbage, although this common name usually refers to wild variants of Brassica oleracea, the cabbage plant. Jewelflowers are native to the southwestern United States and northern Mexico, where they are often found in warm, arid regions. Many species have an enlarged, erect stem rising from a basal rosette of leaves. Flowers arise directly from the surface of the stem; many species have colorful, bell-shaped flowers. The best-known of the fourteen species is probably the desert candle.

Selected species:

- Caulanthus amplexicaulis – claspingleaf wild cabbage, Santa Barbara jewelflower
- Caulanthus barnebyi – Black Rock wild cabbage
- Caulanthus californicus – California jewelflower
- Caulanthus cooperi – Cooper's wild cabbage
- Caulanthus coulteri – Coulter's wild cabbage
- Caulanthus crassicaulis – thickstem wild cabbage
- Caulanthus glaucus – glaucous wild cabbage
- Caulanthus hallii – Hall's wild cabbage
- Caulanthus heterophyllus – San Diego wild cabbage
- Caulanthus inflatus – desert candle
- Caulanthus major – slender wild cabbage
- Caulanthus pilosus – hairy wild cabbage, chocolate drops
- Caulanthus simulans – Payson's wild cabbage

== Formerly included taxa ==
- Streptanthus anceps – Lemmon's mustard
- Streptanthus flavescens – yellow mustard
- Streptanthus lasiophyllus – California mustard
