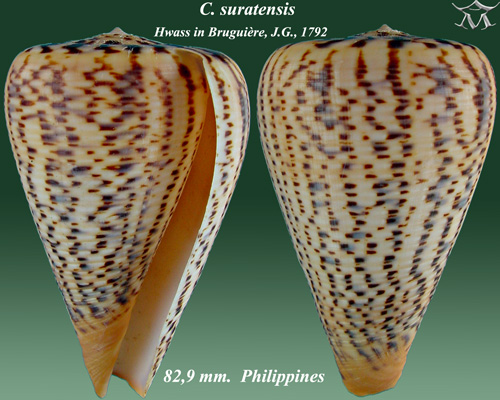
- Apertural and abapertural views of shell of Conus suratensis Hwass in Bruguière, J.G., 1792
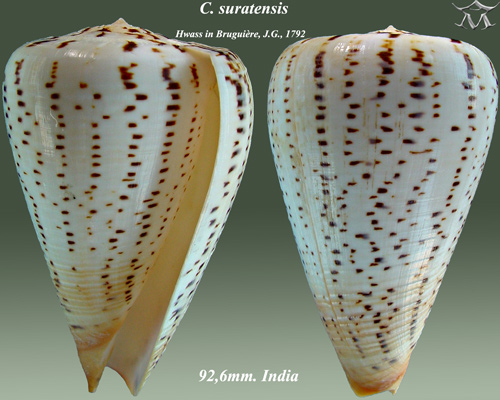

Conservation status
- Least Concern (IUCN 3.1)

Scientific classification
- Kingdom: Animalia
- Phylum: Mollusca
- Class: Gastropoda
- Subclass: Caenogastropoda
- Order: Neogastropoda
- Superfamily: Conoidea
- Family: Conidae
- Genus: Conus
- Species: C. suratensis

Binomial name
- Conus suratensis Hwass in Bruguière, 1792

Synonyms
- Conus (Dendroconus) suratensis Hwass in Bruguière, 1792 · accepted, alternate representation; Dendroconus suratensis (Hwass in Bruguière, 1792)

= Conus suratensis =

Species of sea snail

Conus suratensis, common name the Surat cone, is a species of sea snail, a marine gastropod mollusk in the family Conidae, the cone snails and their allies.

Like all species within the genus Conus, these snails are predatory and venomous. They are capable of stinging humans, therefore live ones should be handled carefully or not at all.

== Description ==
The size of the shell varies between 40 mm and 161 mm. The color of the shell is yellow or orange-brown, with revolving series of numerous spots, and short lines of chocolate upon narrow white bands. The more rugose growth lines cause them to be rather regularly interrupted, so that they form longitudinal as well as revolving series. The spire is radiated with chocolate. The base of the shell is strongly grooved.

== Distribution ==
This marine species occurs in the Indo-Pacific off the Andaman and Nicobar Islands, in the Andaman Sea, off Bangladesh, in the Bay of Bengal, off Eastern Indi, off Indo-Malaysia, off Madagascar, off Myanmar (Burma), off the Solomon Islands, off Sri Lanka, off Thailand and off Australia (Queensland).
