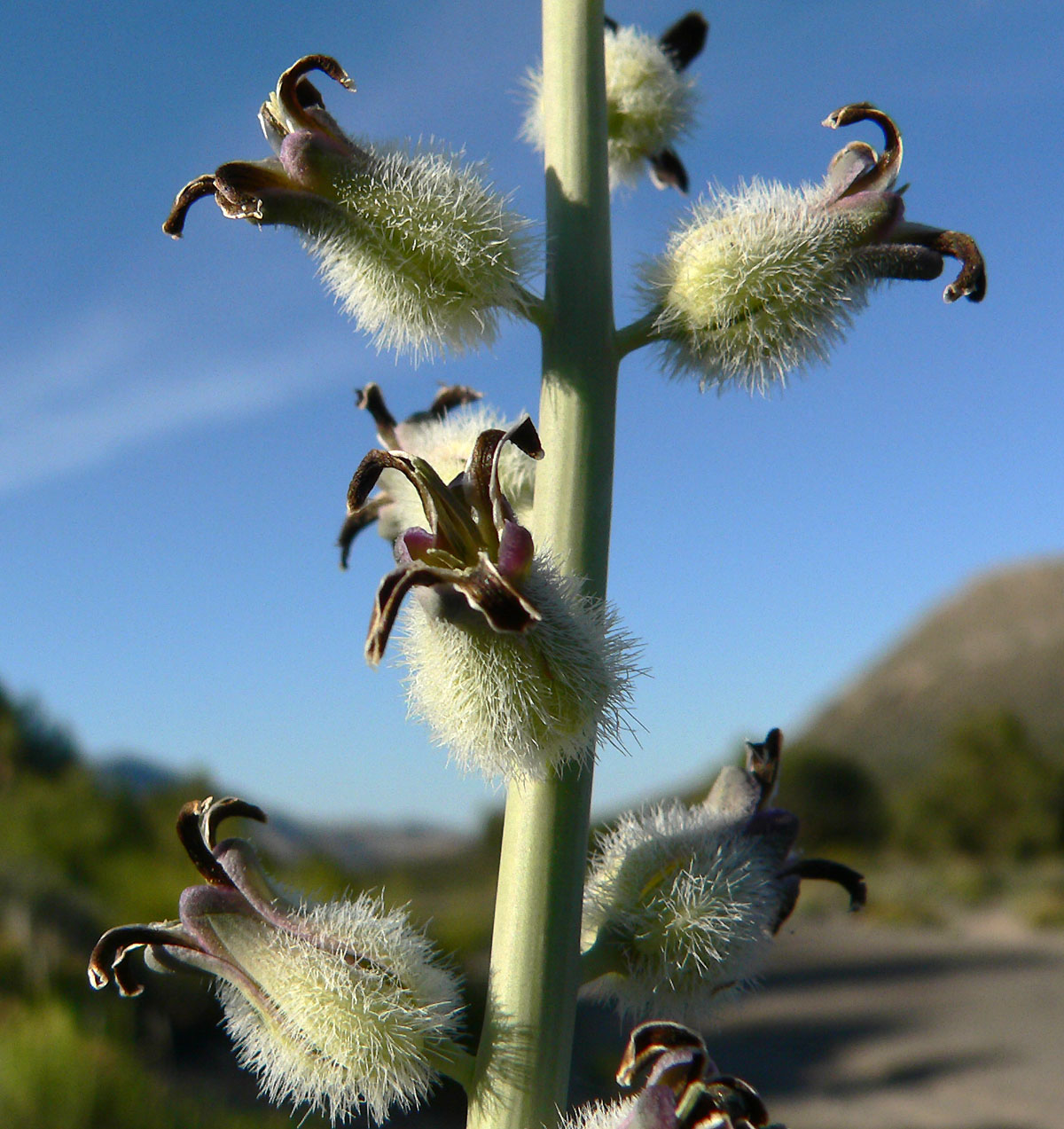
- var. crassicaulis

Conservation status
- Apparently Secure (NatureServe)

Scientific classification
- Kingdom: Plantae
- Clade: Tracheophytes
- Clade: Angiosperms
- Clade: Eudicots
- Clade: Rosids
- Order: Brassicales
- Family: Brassicaceae
- Genus: Caulanthus
- Species: C. crassicaulis

Binomial name
- Caulanthus crassicaulis (Torr.) S.Watson

= Caulanthus crassicaulis =

Species of flowering plant

Caulanthus crassicaulis is a species of flowering plant in the family Brassicaceae known by the common name thickstem wild cabbage. It is native to the western United States where it is a member of the flora in sagebrush, woodland, and desert scrub habitats. This is a perennial herb producing a stout, inflated stem from a woody caudex base. The leaves form a basal rosette and occur at intervals along the stem. They are broadly lance-shaped on the lower stem and much smaller and linear in shape higher up. They may have smooth, toothed, or deeply cut edges. The rounded flower has a coat of thick, pouched sepals which part at the flower tip to reveal narrow dark purple or brown petals. There are two varieties of this species: var. crassicaulis generally has hairy flowers, while var. glaber has hairless. The fruit is a long, thin silique which may approach 13 centimeters (5.1 in) in length.
