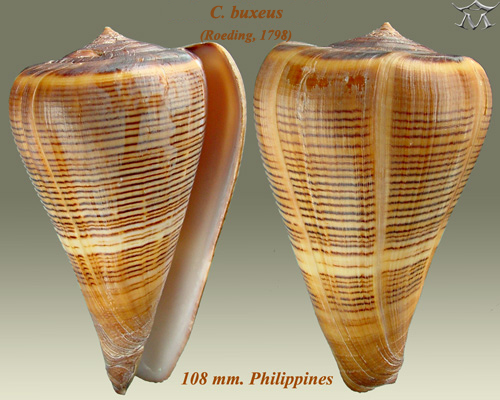
- Apertural and abapertural views of shell of Conus buxeus (Roeding, 1798)
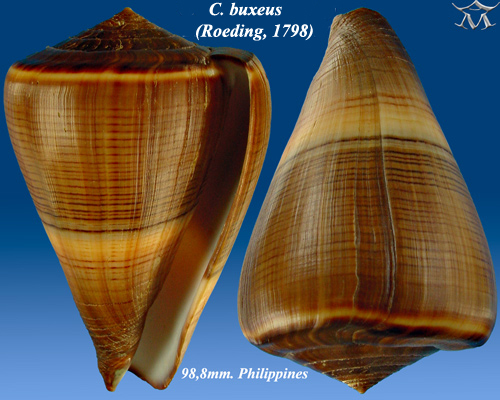

Scientific classification
- Kingdom: Animalia
- Phylum: Mollusca
- Class: Gastropoda
- Subclass: Caenogastropoda
- Order: Neogastropoda
- Superfamily: Conoidea
- Family: Conidae
- Genus: Conus
- Species: C. buxeus

Binomial name
- Conus buxeus (Röding, 1798)

Synonyms
- Conus (Dendroconus) buxeus (Röding, 1798) · accepted, alternate representation; Conus buxeus buxeus (Röding, 1798); Cucullus buxeus Röding, 1798; Dendroconus buxeus (Röding, 1798); Dendroconus buxeus buxeus (Röding, 1798)

= Conus buxeus =

Species of sea snail

Conus buxeus, common name the fig cone, is a species of sea snail, a marine gastropod mollusk in the family Conidae, the cone snails and their allies.

Like all species within the genus Conus, these snails are predatory and venomous. They are capable of stinging humans, therefore live ones should be handled carefully or not at all.

There is one subspecies : Conus buxeus loroisii Kiener, 1845 (synonyms : Conus agrestis Mörch, 1850; Conus figulinus var. insignis Dautzenberg, 1937; Conus huberorum da Motta, 1989; Dendroconus loroisii insignis (f) Dautzenberg, 1937)

== Description ==
The size of the shell varies between 30 mm and 135 mm.

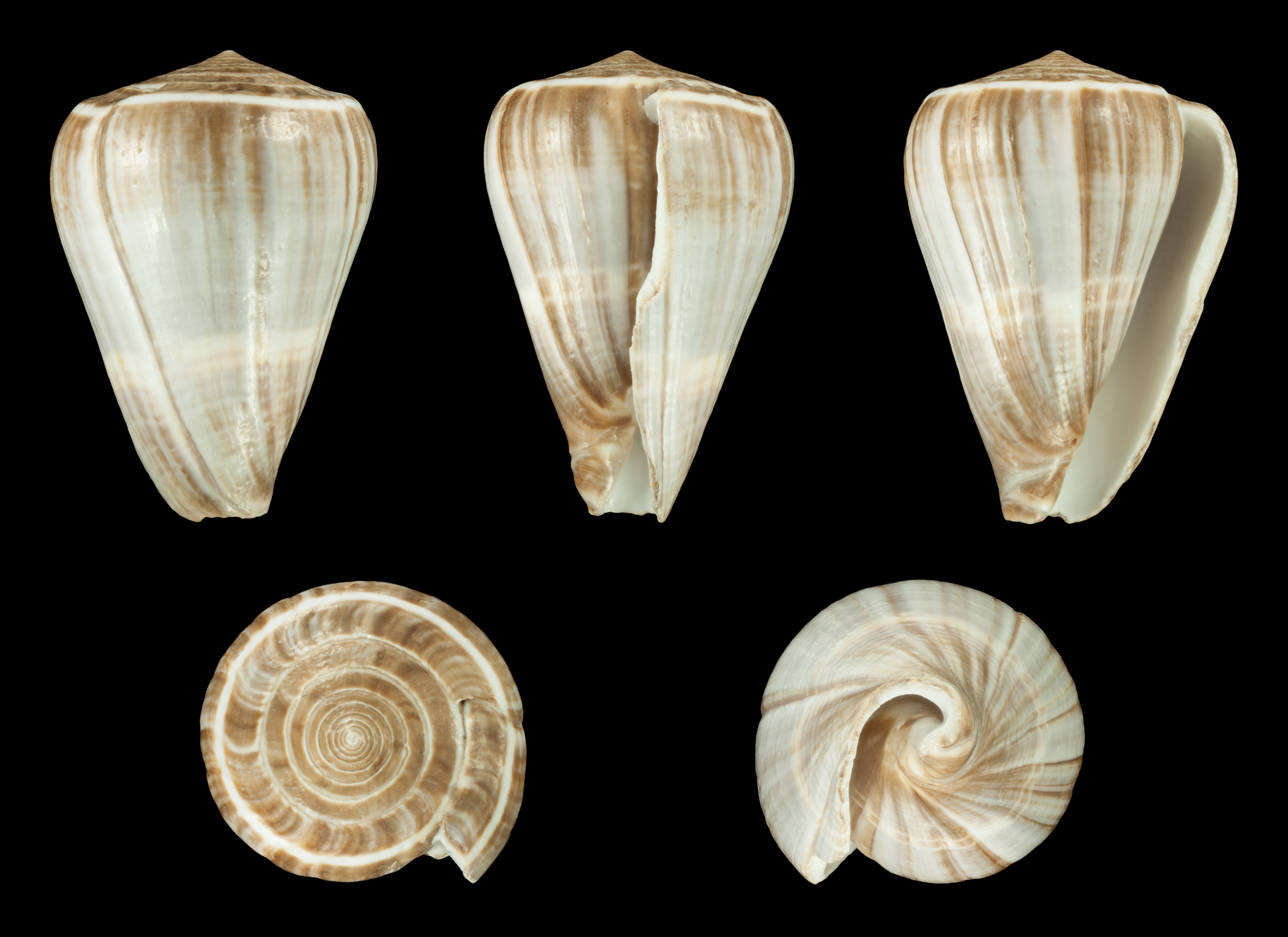
Conus buxeus loroisii

== Distribution ==
This species occurs in the Indo-West Pacific.
