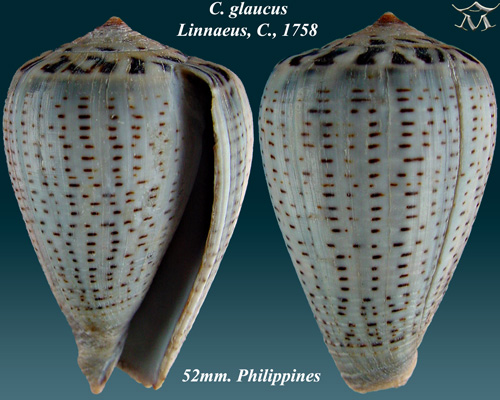
- Apertural and abapertural views of shell of Conus glaucus Linnaeus, C., 1758
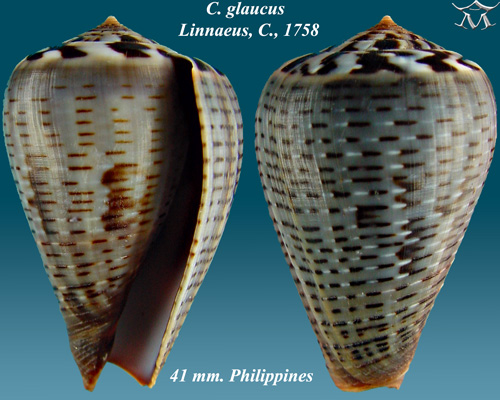

Conservation status
- Least Concern (IUCN 3.1)

Scientific classification
- Kingdom: Animalia
- Phylum: Mollusca
- Class: Gastropoda
- Subclass: Caenogastropoda
- Order: Neogastropoda
- Superfamily: Conoidea
- Family: Conidae
- Genus: Conus
- Species: C. glaucus

Binomial name
- Conus glaucus Linnaeus, 1758

Synonyms
- Conus (Dendroconus) glaucus Linnaeus, 1758 · accepted, alternate representation; Cucullus fraxineus Röding, 1798; Dendroconus glaucus (Linnaeus, 1758)

= Conus glaucus =

Species of sea snail

Conus glaucus, common name the glaucous cone, is a species of sea snail, a marine gastropod mollusk in the family Conidae, the cone snails and their allies.

Like all species within the genus Conus, these snails are predatory and venomous. They are capable of stinging humans, therefore live ones should be handled carefully or not at all.

== Description ==
The size of the shell varies between 30 mm and 65 mm. The color of the shell is bluish ash or very light chocolate, with usually a lighter narrow central band, and numerous short chocolate lines in revolving series. The spire is broadly radiated with chocolate.

== Distribution ==
This marine species occurs off the Philippines, Indonesia and Vanuatu.
