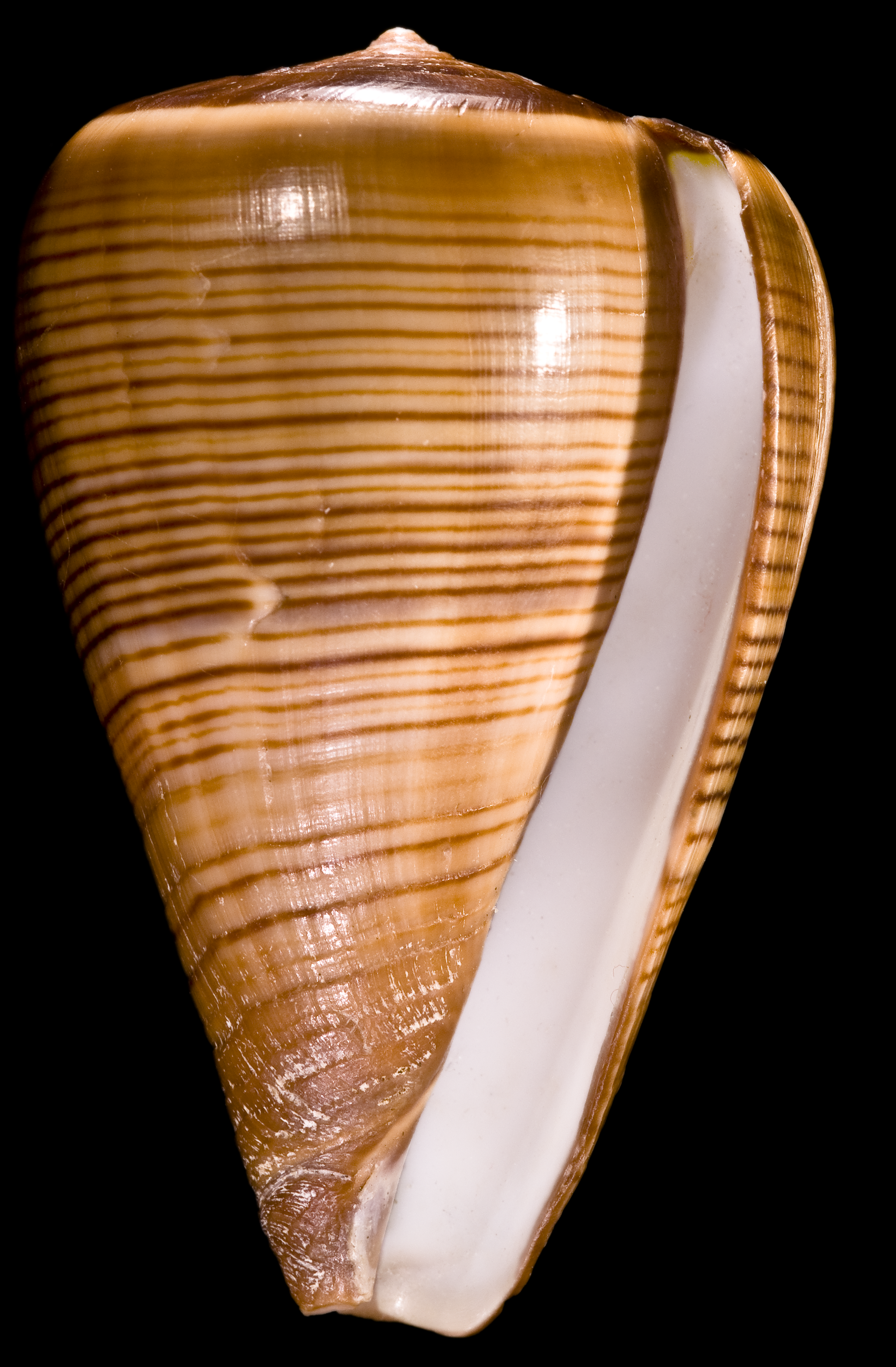
- Apertural view of a shell of Conus figulinus

Conservation status
- Least Concern (IUCN 3.1)

Scientific classification
- Kingdom: Animalia
- Phylum: Mollusca
- Class: Gastropoda
- Subclass: Caenogastropoda
- Order: Neogastropoda
- Superfamily: Conoidea
- Family: Conidae
- Genus: Conus
- Species: C. figulinus

Binomial name
- Conus figulinus Linnaeus, 1758

Synonyms
- Cleobula figulina (Linnaeus, 1758); Conus (Dendroconus) figulinus Linnaeus, 1758 accepted, alternate representation; Conus lucirensis Paes Da Franca, 1957; Conus violascens Barros e Cunha, 1933.; Dendroconus figulinus (Linnaeus, 1758); Dendroconus loroisii violascens (f) Barros & C.M.I. Cunha, 1933

= Conus figulinus =

Species of mollusc

Conus figulinus, common name the fig cone, is a cone snail, a species of sea snail, a marine gastropod mollusk in the family Conidae, the cone snails and their allies.

Like all species within the genus Conus, these snails are predatory and venomous. They are capable of stinging humans, therefore live ones should be handled carefully or not at all.

Dendroconus buxeus, Dendroconus glaucus and Dendroconus loroisii are all very similar to Conus figulinus, but are considered each a unique species.

== Description ==
The size of an adult shell varies between 30 mm and 135 mm. The shell has a chestnut color, encircled by numerous, unbroken, narrow chocolate lines. The spire is chocolate-colored. The body whorl is occasionally narrowly light-banded in the middle.

== Distribution ==
This species occurs in the Indian Ocean off Madagascar, the Mascarene Basin, Mauritius and Tanzania; in the Indo-West Pacific, Indo-Malaysia, Fiji, New Caledonia, Solomon Islands, Vanuatu, India and Australia (Queensland).

== Gallery ==
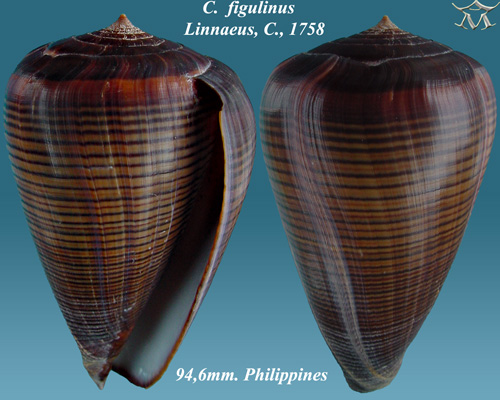
Conus figulinus Linnaeus, C., 1758

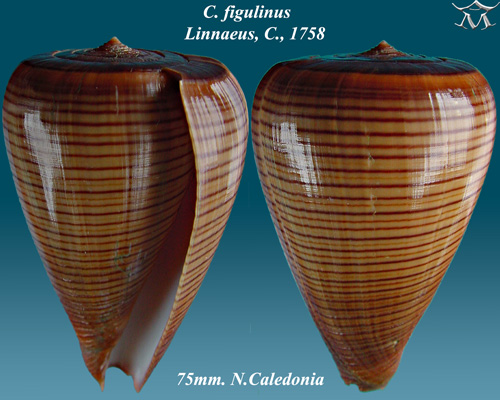
Conus figulinus Linnaeus, C., 1758

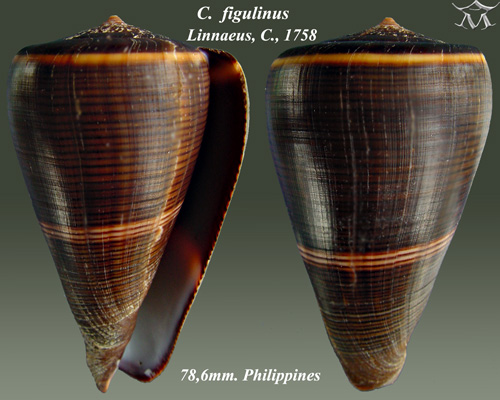
Conus figulinus Linnaeus, C., 1758

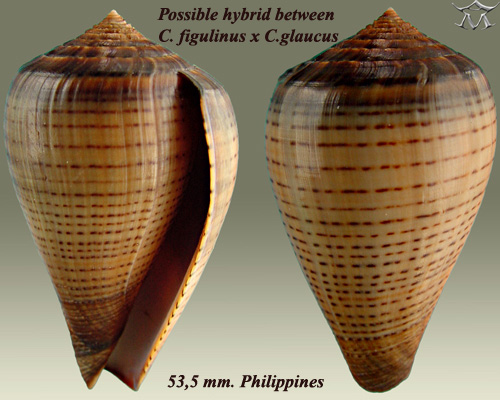
Possible hybrid between the two species. C. figulinus x glaucus
