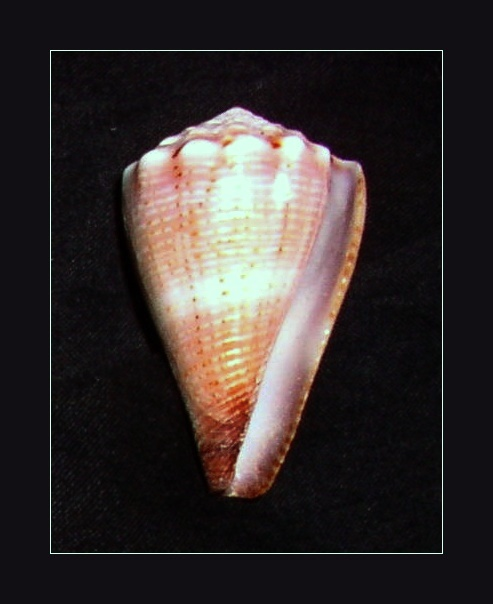

Conservation status
- Least Concern (IUCN 3.1)

Scientific classification
- Kingdom: Animalia
- Phylum: Mollusca
- Class: Gastropoda
- Subclass: Caenogastropoda
- Order: Neogastropoda
- Superfamily: Conoidea
- Family: Conidae
- Genus: Conus
- Species: C. biliosus

Binomial name
- Conus biliosus (Röding, 1798)

Synonyms
- Conus (Splinoconus) biliosus (Röding, 1798) accepted, alternate combination; Conus biliosus biliosus (Röding, 1798); Conus concinnus G. B. Sowerby II, 1866 (invalid: junior homonym of Conus concinnus J. de C. Sowerby, 1821; Conus sapphirostoma is a replacement name); Conus piperatus Dillwyn, 1817; Conus punctatus Hwass in Bruguière, 1792; Conus roseus Lamarck, 1810 (Invalid: junior homonym of Conus roseus Fischer von Waldheim, 1807; Dendroconus neoroseus is a replacement name); Conus sapphirostoma Weinkauff, 1874; Cucullus biliosus Röding, 1798 (original combination); Dendroconus biliosus (Röding, 1798); Dendroconus neoroseus da Motta, 1993; Lividoconus biliosus (Röding, 1798); Splinoconus biliosus (Röding, 1798); Splinoconus biliosus biliosus (Röding, 1798); Viroconus imperator Woolacott, 1956

= Conus biliosus =

Species of sea snail

Conus biliosus, common name the bilious cone, is a species of sea snail, a marine gastropod mollusk in the family Conidae, the cone snails and their allies.

Like all species within the genus Conus, these snails are predatory and venomous. They are capable of stinging humans, therefore live ones should be handled carefully or not at all.

== Subspecies ==
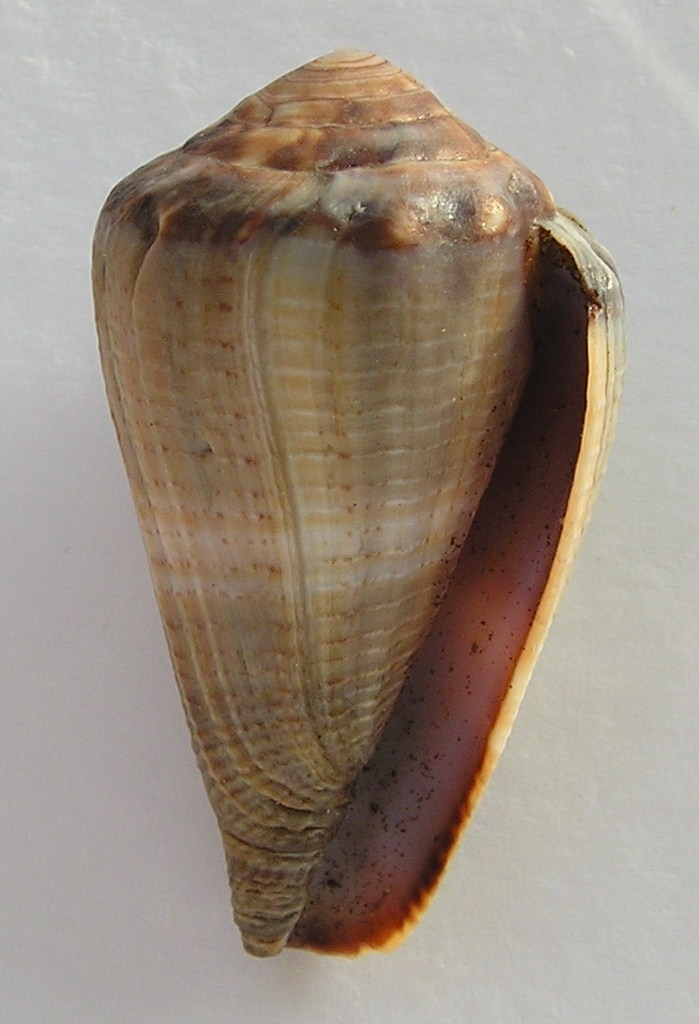
Apertural view of Conus biliosus parvulus

Subspecies include:

- Conus biliosus meyeri Walls, 1979 (synonym: Lividiconus meyeri (Walls, 1979); Splinoconus biliosus meyeri (Walls, 1979)· accepted, alternate representation)
- Conus biliosus parvulus Link, 1807 (synonyms: Conus parvulus Link, 1807; Conus imperator Woolacott, 1956; Conus roseus Lamarck, 1810)

== Description ==
The size of an adult shell varies between 25 mm and 64 mm. The small shell is smooth and striate below. Its color is yellowish white, with revolving rows of quadrangular chestnut spots, sometimes partly clouded over, so as to form bands of chestnut clouds. The spire is maculate.

== Distribution ==
This species occurs in the Western Indian Ocean (from South Africa to Somalia) and off India and Sri Lanka; in the Pacific Ocean from Indonesia to the Philippines and to Papua New Guinea, the Solomon Islands and Queensland and the Northern Territory, Australia.

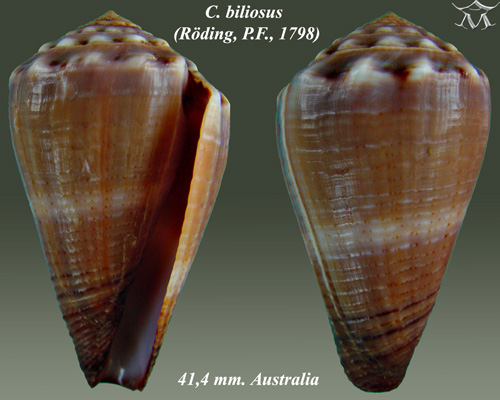
Conus biliosus (Röding, P.F., 1798)

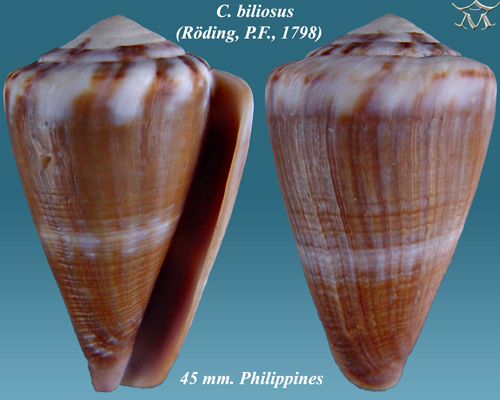
Conus biliosus (Röding, P.F., 1798)

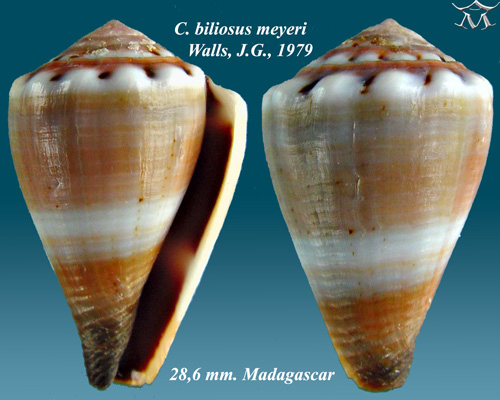
Conus biliosus meyeri Walls, J.G., 1979

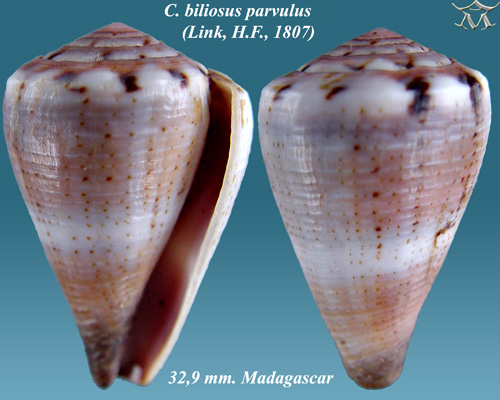
Conus biliosus parvulus (Link, H.F., 1807)
