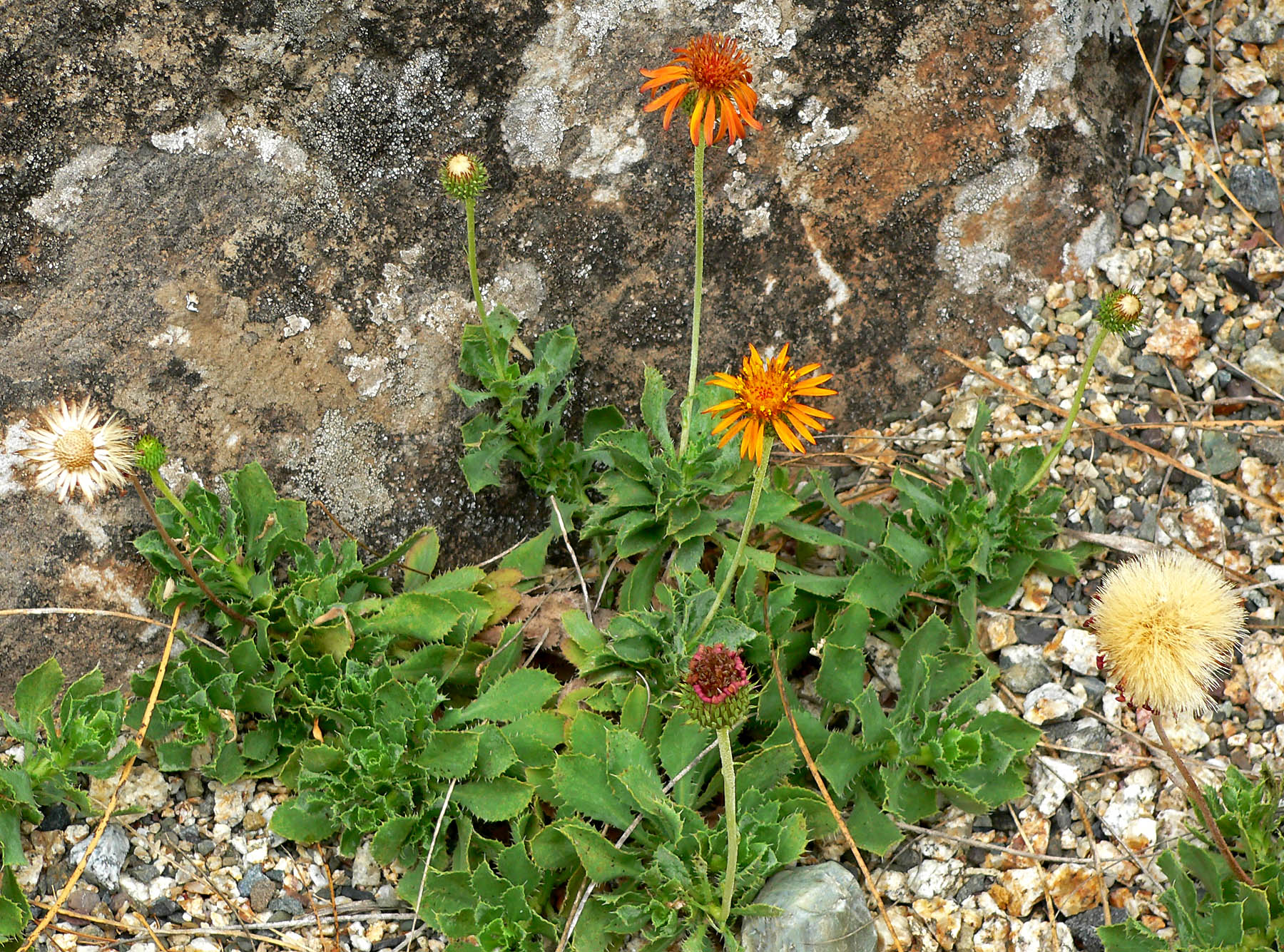
- Haplopappus foliosus

Scientific classification
- Kingdom: Plantae
- Clade: Embryophytes
- Clade: Tracheophytes
- Clade: Spermatophytes
- Clade: Angiosperms
- Clade: Eudicots
- Clade: Asterids
- Order: Asterales
- Family: Asteraceae
- Subfamily: Asteroideae
- Tribe: Astereae
- Subtribe: Machaerantherinae
- Genus: Haplopappus; Cass. conserved spelling

Type species
- Haplopappus glutinosus Cass.

Synonyms
- Aplopappus alternate spelling; Apargidium Torr. & A.Gray; Exothamnus D.Don ex Hook.; Chroilema Bernhardi ex Schlechtendal; Haplodiscus (Benth.) Phil.

= Haplopappus =

Genus of flowering plants

Haplopappus is a genus of flowering plants in the family Asteraceae found in South America, mostly restricted to the dry regions of the Southern Andes, Chilean Matorral, and Patagonia.

== Taxonomy ==
=== Species ===
Species accepted by the Plants of the World Online as of December 2022:

- Haplopappus albicans Benoist
- Haplopappus angustifolius Reiche
- Haplopappus anthylloides Meyen & Walp.
- Haplopappus baylahuen J.Rémy
- Haplopappus bezanillanus (J.Rémy) Reiche
- Haplopappus boelckei Tortosa & Adr.Bartoli
- Haplopappus canescens Reiche
- Haplopappus cerberoanus (J.Rémy) Reiche
- Haplopappus chrysanthemifolius DC.
- Haplopappus coquimbensis (Hook. & Arn.) Klingenb.
- Haplopappus decurrens J.Rémy
- Haplopappus deserticola Phil.
- Haplopappus diplopappus J.Rémy
- Haplopappus donianus Sch.Bip. ex Reiche
- Haplopappus elatus Reiche
- Haplopappus ferreyrae Cabrera
- Haplopappus foliosus DC.
- Haplopappus glutinosus Cass.
- Haplopappus graveolens Reiche
- Haplopappus grindelioides DC.
- Haplopappus hirtellus Phil.
- Haplopappus humilis Reiche
- Haplopappus integerrimus (Hook. & Arn.) H.M.Hall
- Haplopappus kingii Reiche
- Haplopappus lanatus Hook.f.
- Haplopappus latifolius Reiche
- Haplopappus linifolius Reiche
- Haplopappus macreanus (J.Rémy) Reiche
- Haplopappus macrocephalus (Poepp. ex Less.) DC.
- Haplopappus marginalis Phil.
- Haplopappus maulinus Klingenb.
- Haplopappus mendocinus Tortosa & Adr.Bartoli
- Haplopappus mieresii P.Medina & Nic.García
- Haplopappus mucronatus Hook. & Arn.
- Haplopappus multifolius Phil. ex Reiche
- Haplopappus nahuelbutae Klingenb.
- Haplopappus ochagavianus Phil.
- Haplopappus parvifolius A.Gray
- Haplopappus paucidentatus Phil.
- Haplopappus pedunculosus J.Rémy
- Haplopappus philippii H.M.Hall
- Haplopappus phyllophorus Reiche
- Haplopappus pinea Reiche
- Haplopappus pinnatifidus Nutt.
- Haplopappus platylepis Phil.
- Haplopappus poeppigianus A.Gray
- Haplopappus pristiphyllus (J.Rémy) H.M.Hall
- Haplopappus pulchellus DC.
- Haplopappus pusillus Klingenb.
- Haplopappus racemiger Klingenb.
- Haplopappus reicheanus H.M.Hall
- Haplopappus remyanus Wedd.
- Haplopappus rengifoanus J.Rémy
- Haplopappus retinervius (Kuntze) Klingenb.
- Haplopappus rigidus Phil.
- Haplopappus rosulatus H.M.Hall
- Haplopappus rotundifolius H.M.Hall
- Haplopappus scaposus J.Rémy
- Haplopappus schumannii (Kuntze) G.K.Br. & W.D.Clark
- Haplopappus scrobiculatus DC.
- Haplopappus serrulatus Reiche
- Haplopappus setulosus Klingenb.
- Haplopappus stelliger J.Rémy
- Haplopappus stolpii Phil.
- Haplopappus struthionum Speg.
- Haplopappus taeda Reiche
- Haplopappus uncinatus Phil.
- Haplopappus undulatus Klingenb.
- Haplopappus valparadisiacus Klingenb.
- Haplopappus velutinus J.Rémy
- Haplopappus vicuniensis Klingenb.
- Haplopappus viridialbus Cuatrec.

Formerly included

Many species once included in Haplopappus are now regarded as belonging to other genera: Acamptopappus, Ageratina, Aztecaster, Benitoa, Croptilon, Ericameria, Grindelia, Gundlachia, Haploesthes, Hazardia, Inulopsis, Isocoma, Leptostelma, Llerasia, Lorandersonia, Machaeranthera, Nestotus, Noticastrum, Oonopsis, Oreochrysum, Oreostemma, Osbertia, Pyrrocoma, Rayjacksonia, Stenotus, Toiyabea, Tonestus, Xanthisma
