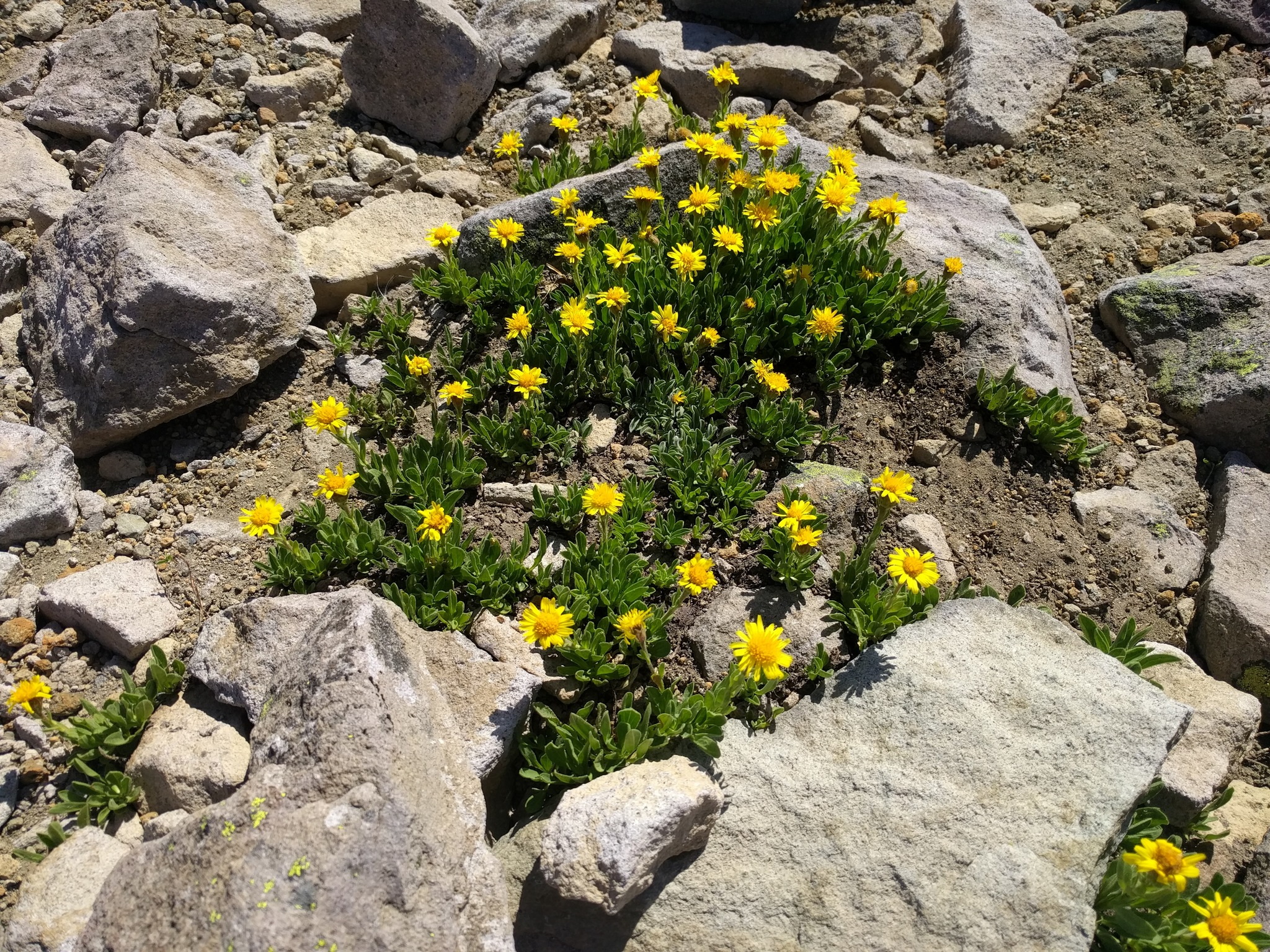
- Tonestus lyallii

Scientific classification
- Kingdom: Plantae
- Clade: Embryophytes
- Clade: Tracheophytes
- Clade: Spermatophytes
- Clade: Angiosperms
- Clade: Eudicots
- Clade: Asterids
- Order: Asterales
- Family: Asteraceae
- Subfamily: Asteroideae
- Tribe: Astereae
- Subtribe: Solidagininae
- Genus: Tonestus; A.Nelson

Synonyms
- Haplopappus sect. Tonestus (A.Nelson) H.M.Hall

= Tonestus =

Genus of plants

Tonestus, common name serpentweed, is a genus of North American flowering plants in the family Asteraceae.

The name is an anagram of the name of the related genus Stenotus. Nestotus is similarly another anagram of the same name.

Species

- Tonestus lyallii (A.Gray) A.Nelson - Alberta, British Columbia, WA OR ID MT CO WY NV CA
- Tonestus pygmaeus (Torr. & A.Gray) A.Nelson - MT WY CO NM

formerly included

now in Eurybia Lorandersonia Toiyabea Triniteurybia

- Tonestus aberrans (A.Nelson) G.L.Nesom & D.R.Morgan - Triniteurybia aberrans
- Tonestus alpinus (L.C.Anderson & Goodrich) G.L.Nesom & D.R.Morgan - Toiyabea alpina (L.C.Anderson & Goodrich) R.P.Roberts, Urbatsch & Neubig
- Tonestus eximius (H.M.Hall) A.Nelson & J.F.Macbr. - Toiyabea eximia (H.M. Hall) Nesom
- Tonestus graniticus (Tiehm & L.M.Shultz) G.L.Nesom & D.R.Morgan - Toiyabea granitica (Tiehm & Schultz) Nesom
- Tonestus kingii (D.C.Eaton) G.L.Nesom - Eurybia kingii (D.C.Eaton) G.L.Nesom
- Tonestus microcephalus (Cronquist) G.L.Nesom & D.R.Morgan - Lorandersonia microcephala (Cronquist) Urbatsch, R.P.Roberts & Neubig
- Tonestus peirsonii (D.D.Keck) G.L.Nesom & D.R.Morgan - Toiyabea peirsonii (D.D. Keck) Nesom
