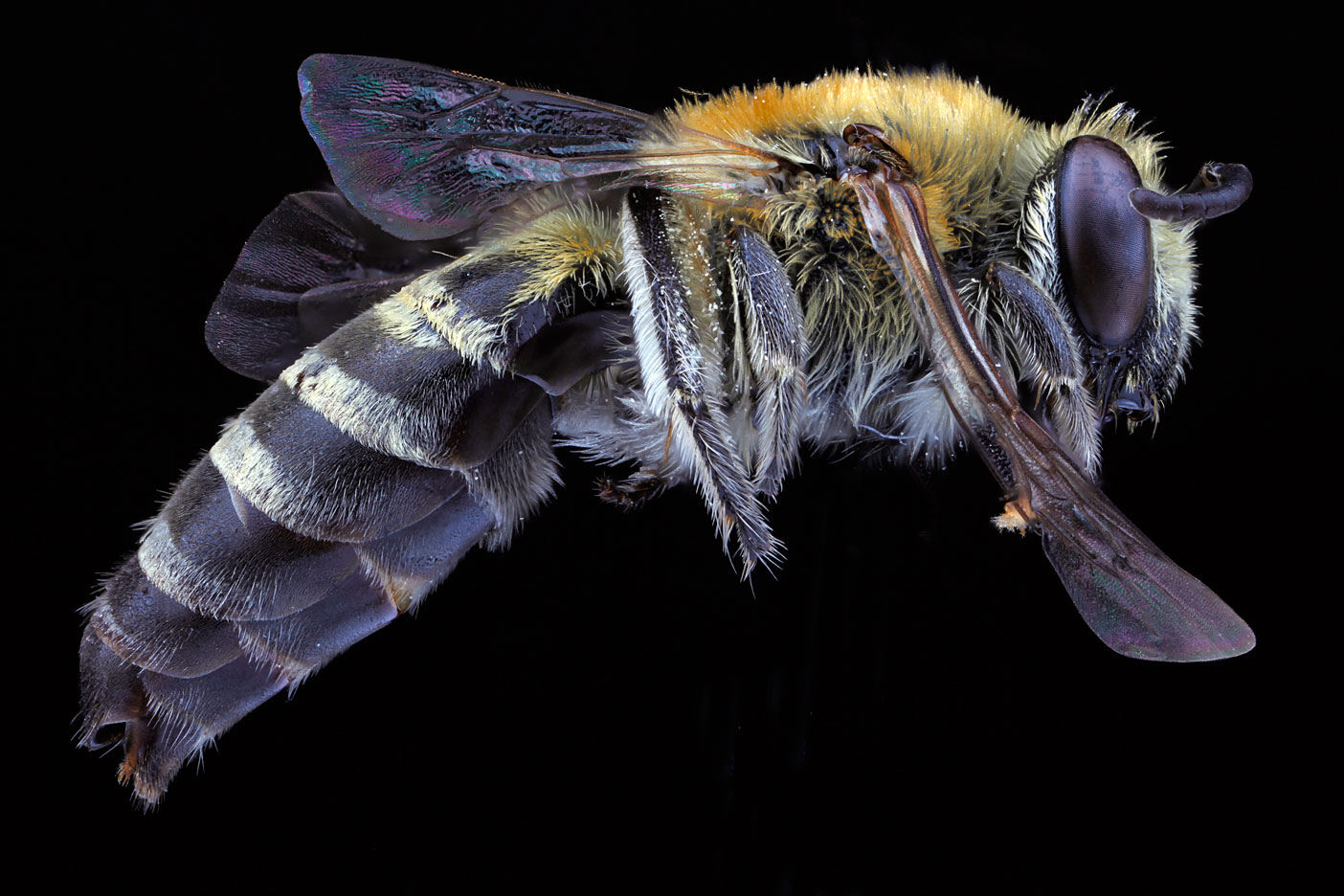
- Image of a female from South Carolina
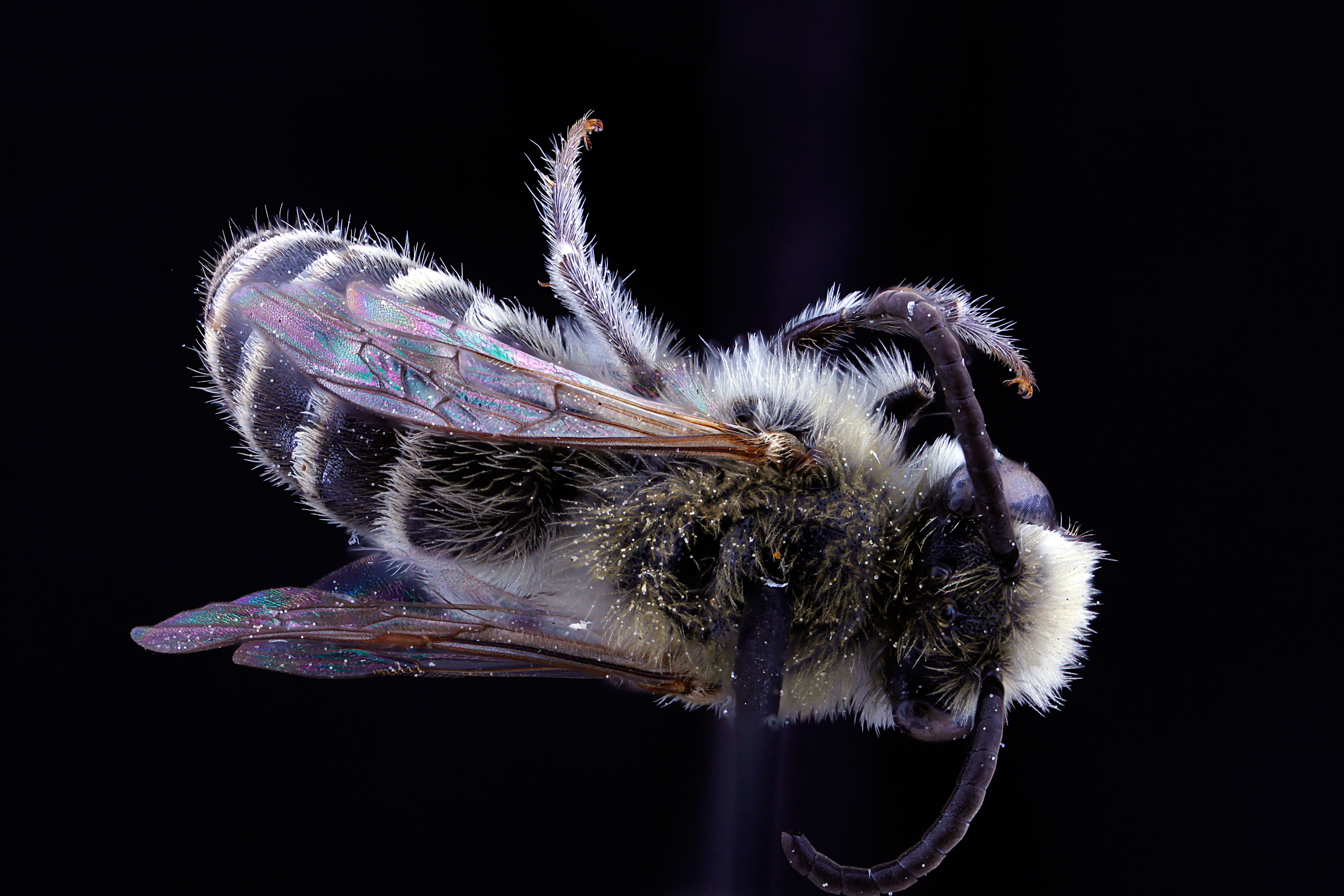
- A male from South Carolina

Scientific classification
- Kingdom: Animalia
- Phylum: Arthropoda
- Clade: Pancrustacea
- Class: Insecta
- Order: Hymenoptera
- Family: Colletidae
- Genus: Colletes
- Species: C. speculiferus

Binomial name
- Colletes speculiferus Cockerell, 1927

= Colletes speculiferus =

Species of bee

Colletes speculiferus, also known as the beach dune cellophone bee, is a species of bee on the subfamily Colletinae It is native to the eastern regions of the United States. They visit many flowers such as Aster, Haplopappus, Pentstemon, Solidago, Melilotus alba and Erigeon quercifolius.

== Distribution ==
It is native to most of the eastern United States in states such as New York, New Jersey, Massachusetts, Delaware, Maryland, North Carolina, South Carolina, Georgia, Florida, Texas, Illinois and Minnesota.

== Description ==
Females of this species are 10 millimeters long. Males are 7-9 millimeters long.
