= Rabbitbrush =

Rabbitbrush at Riverbend Ponds Natural Area, Fort Collins, Colorado

Rabbitbrush is a common name for shrubs, principally of the western United States, in three related genera of the family Asteraceae:

- Chrysothamnus — about seven species in the United States, including Greene's rabbitbrush
- Ericameria — about six species in the United States, including gray (or rubber) and Parry's rabbitbrush
- Lorandersonia — about four species in the United States, including Bailey's rabbitbrush and spearleaf rabbitbrush

Taxonomy for these genera has changed recently; previously, the rabbitbrushes in Ericameria and Lorandersonia were included in Chrysothamnus. In each of these genera, not all species are called "rabbitbrush"; most Ericameria, for instance, are called "goldenbush", and only a minority are called "rabbitbrush".
