= S. acaulis =

S. acaulis may refer to:

- Silene acaulis, a small mountain-dwelling wildflower species
- Stenotus acaulis, a sunflower species
