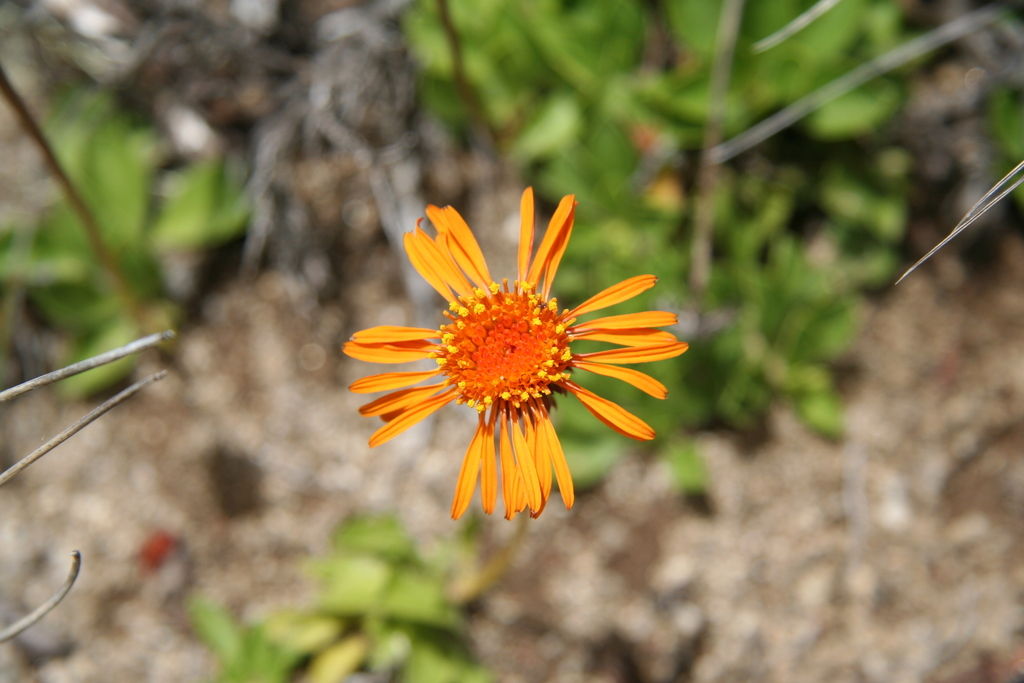
- Parque Nacional Nahuelbuta,10 January 2017
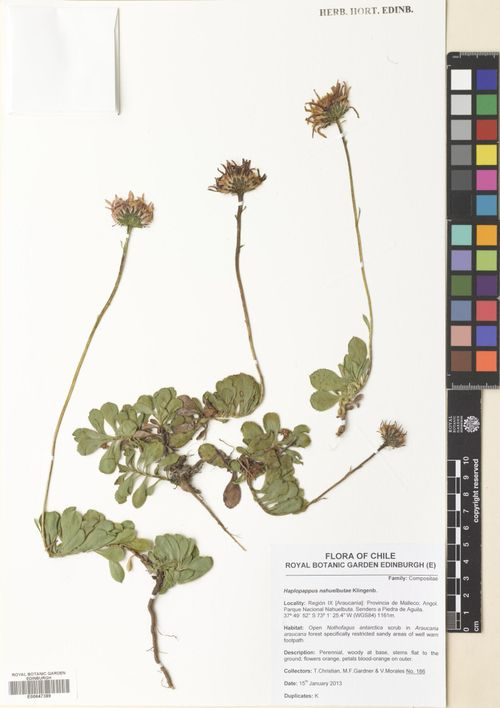
- E00647389

Scientific classification
- Kingdom: Plantae
- Clade: Tracheophytes
- Clade: Angiosperms
- Clade: Eudicots
- Clade: Asterids
- Order: Asterales
- Family: Asteraceae
- Genus: Haplopappus
- Species: H. nahuelbutae

Binomial name
- Haplopappus nahuelbutae Klingenb.

= Haplopappus nahuelbutae =

Species of plant

Haplopappus nahuelbutae is a species of flowering plant in the family Asteraceae that is endemic to Chile and found in the Araucania region.

The species was first described in 1997 by Lieselotte Klingenberg.
