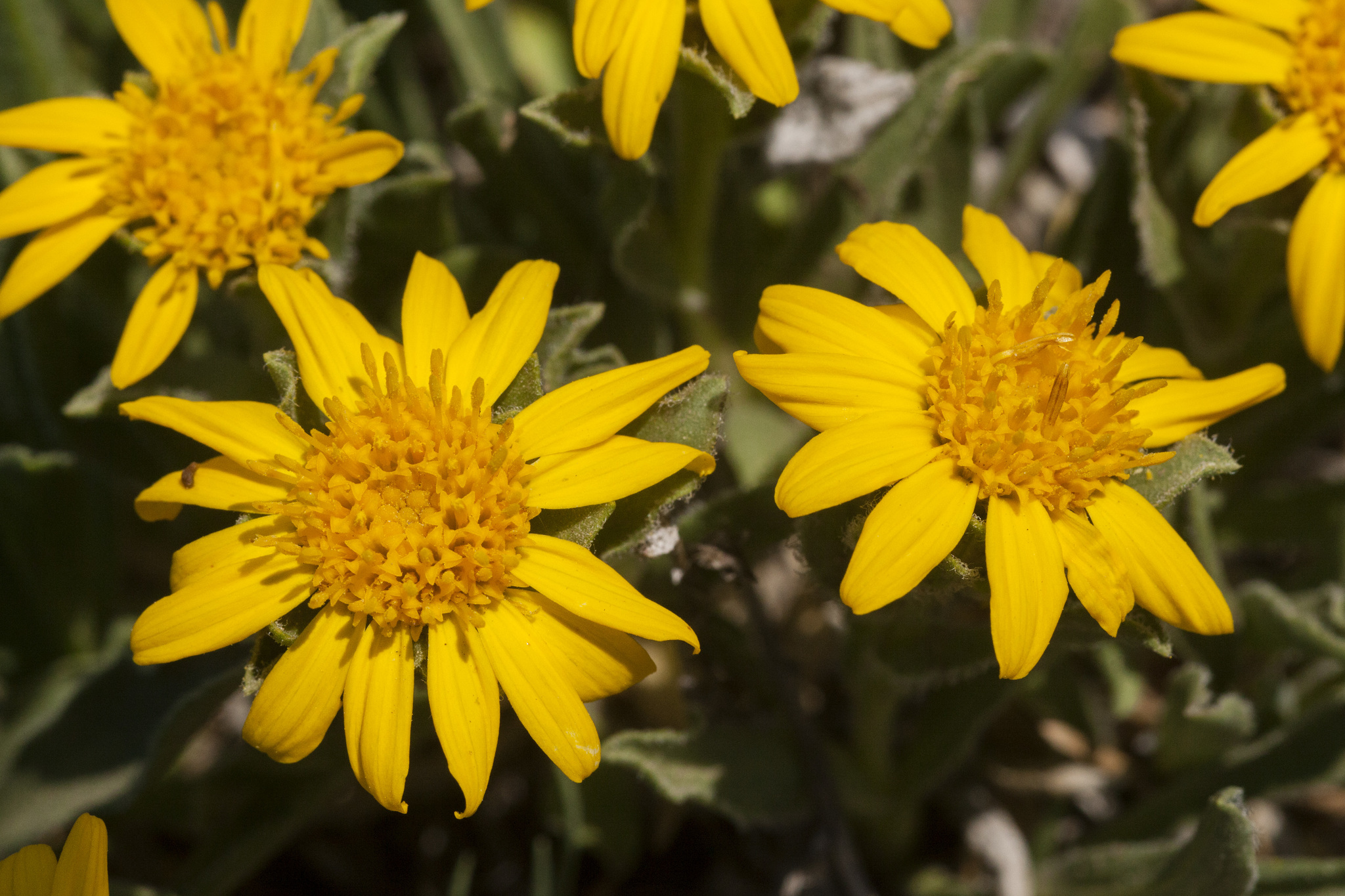

Conservation status
- Apparently Secure (NatureServe)

Scientific classification
- Kingdom: Plantae
- Clade: Tracheophytes
- Clade: Angiosperms
- Clade: Eudicots
- Clade: Asterids
- Order: Asterales
- Family: Asteraceae
- Genus: Tonestus
- Species: T. pygmaeus

Binomial name
- Tonestus pygmaeus (Torr. & A.Gray) A.Nelson

= Tonestus pygmaeus =

Species of plant

Tonestus pygmaeus, the pygmy serpentweed or pygmy goldenweed, is a species of flowering plant in the family Asteraceae. It is endemic to the western United States, where it is found in New Mexico, Colorado, Wyoming, and Montana. The occurrence of pygmy serpentweed in Montana is based solely upon historical specimens.
