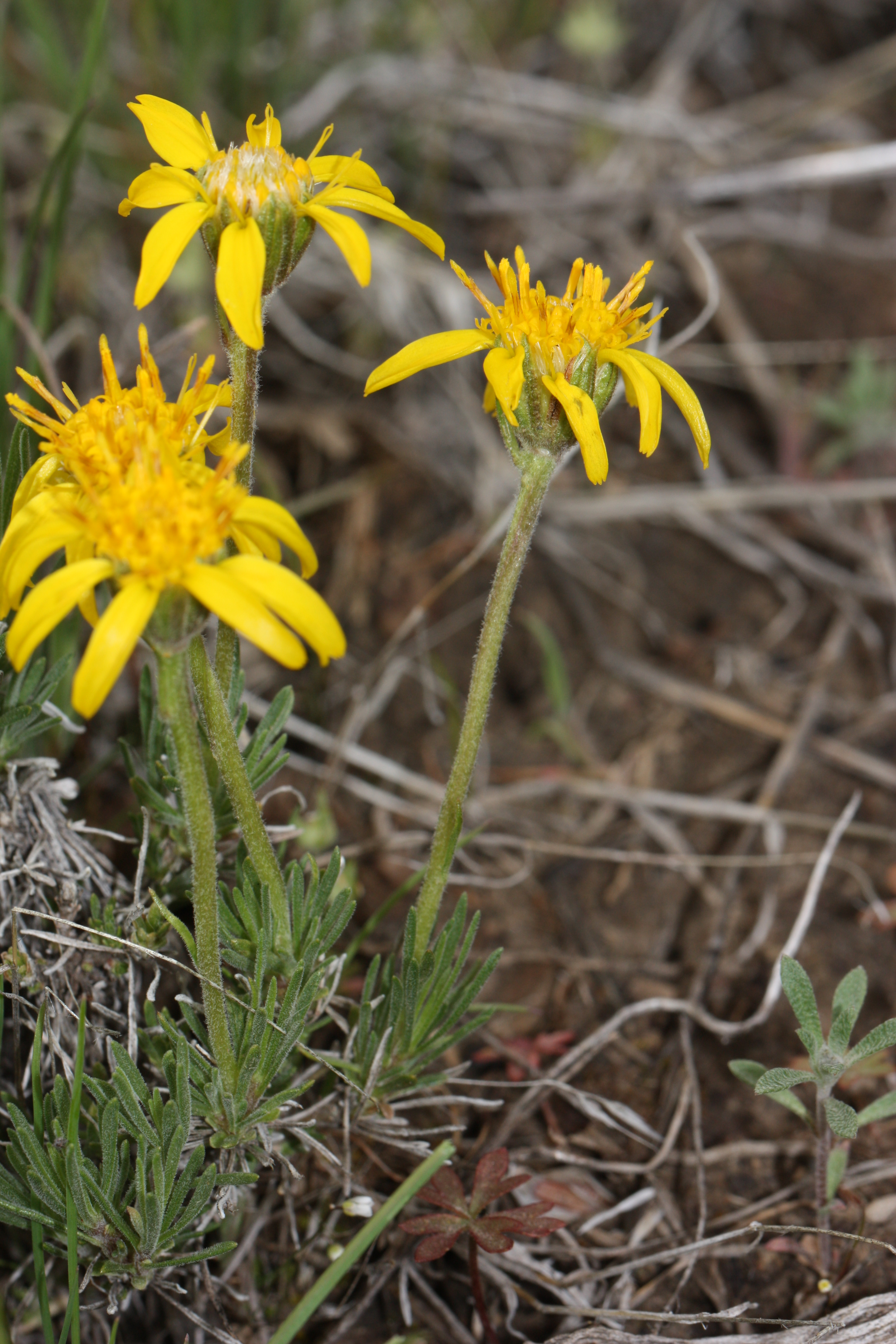

Scientific classification
- Kingdom: Plantae
- Clade: Tracheophytes
- Clade: Angiosperms
- Clade: Eudicots
- Clade: Asterids
- Order: Asterales
- Family: Asteraceae
- Genus: Nestotus
- Species: N. stenophyllus

Binomial name
- Nestotus stenophyllus (A.Gray) R.P.Roberts, Urbatsch & Neubig

Synonyms
- Haplopappus stenophyllus; Stenotus stenophyllus

= Nestotus stenophyllus =

Species of flowering plant

Nestotus stenophyllus is a species of flowering plant in the family Asteraceae known by the common name narrowleaf mock goldenweed. It was previously known as Stenotus stenophyllus. It is native to the western United States, especially the inland Pacific Northwest and northern Great Basin, where it grows in sagebrush habitat usually in rocky soil.

== Description ==
Nestotus stenophyllus is a small, clump-forming perennial sub-shrub growing up to about 12 centimeters tall. Mature plants have a very low woody sprawling base from which the growing stems arise. The woody base is often largely hidden by leaves, so the plant may appear to be herbaceous without close inspection. The rough-glandular leaves are 1 or 2 centimeters long and linear to lance-shaped and are arranged along upright to angled stems up to 6 centimeters long, growing from short woody bases. The leaf glands give them a distinctive stippled appearance when viewed closely. The inflorescence is a solitary flower head atop an erect densely to sparsely wooly peduncle that emerges from the tip of the leafy stem. The flower has glandular-hairy bracts and 8 to 12 yellow ray florets each around a centimeter long, and at the center many yellow disc florets. The involucre (flower bract) is 5 to 9 mm long and consists of many lanceolate lobes with pointed tips. The bracts often appear to have a fringe of long hairs near the top of each lobe, which is actually attached to the base of the florets and will form part of the seed pappus. It flowers in early spring. The fruit is a silky-haired achene tipped with a white pappus.

== Range and Habitat ==
Nestotus stenophyllus grows mostly in dry rocky soils and is common in the shallow rocky soil of the scablands on the Columbia Plateau in Washington State and Oregon. It is also found in Idaho, Nevada, and northern California in similar habitats.

== Gallery ==
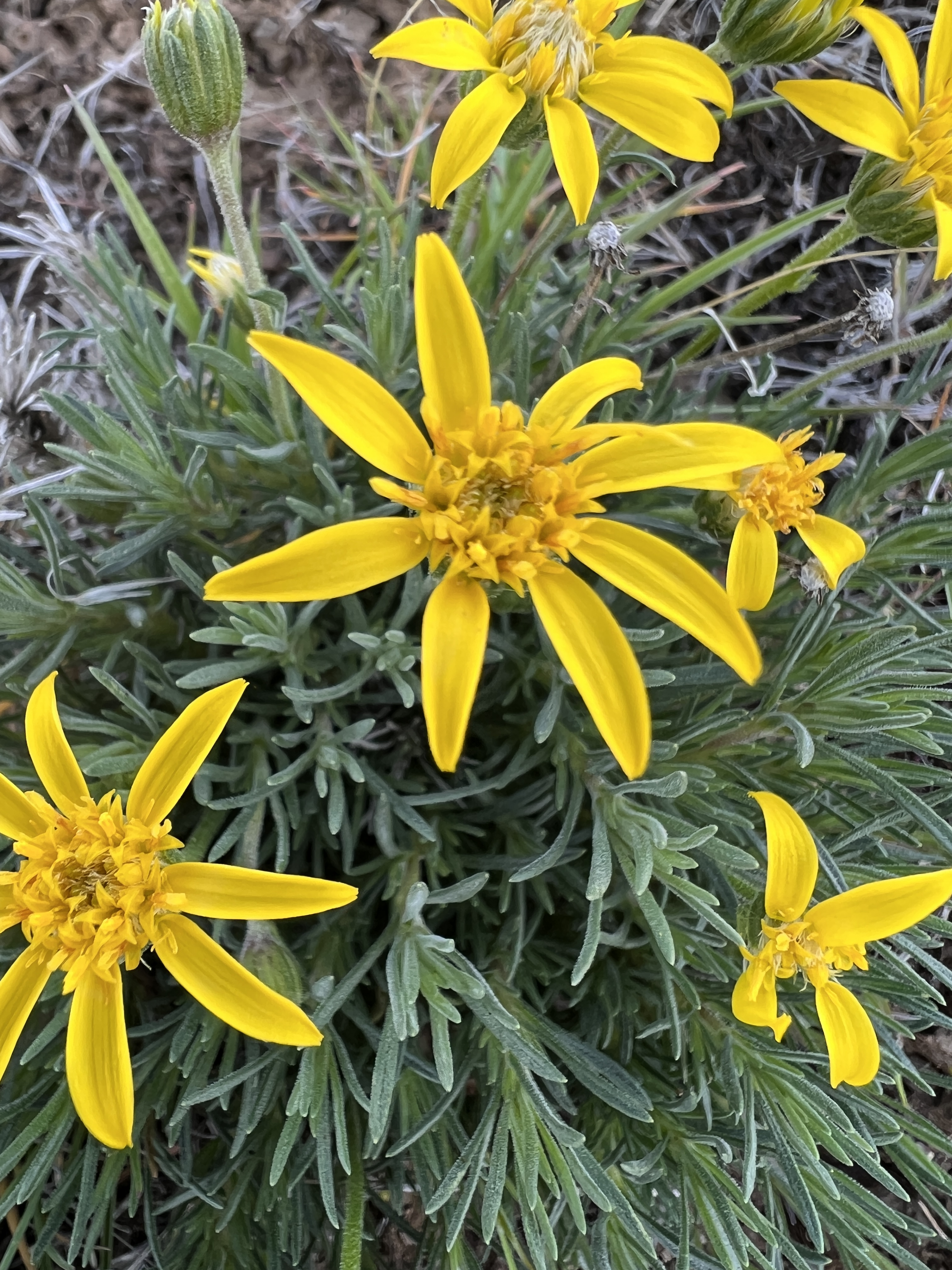
Flower

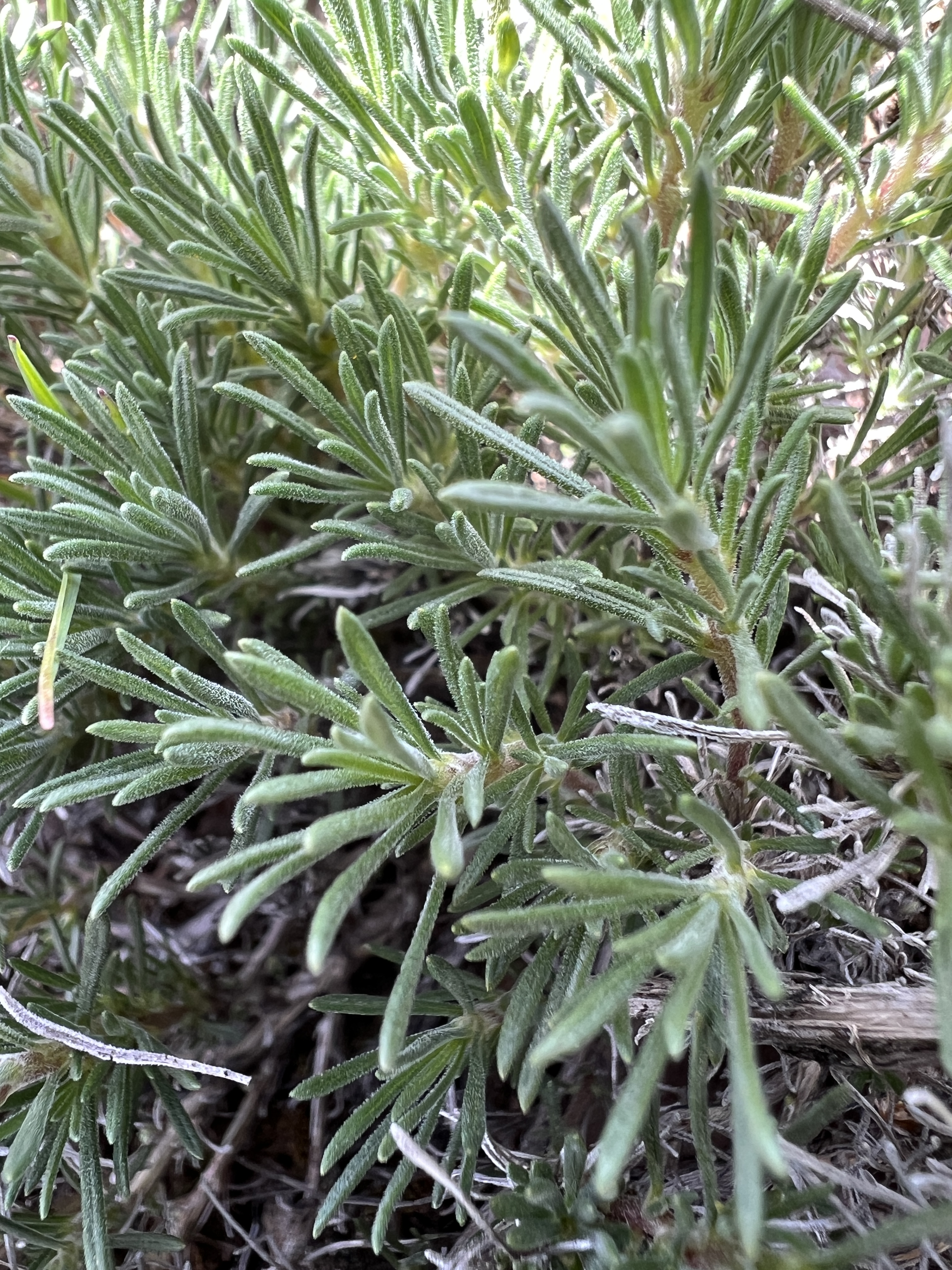
Leaves

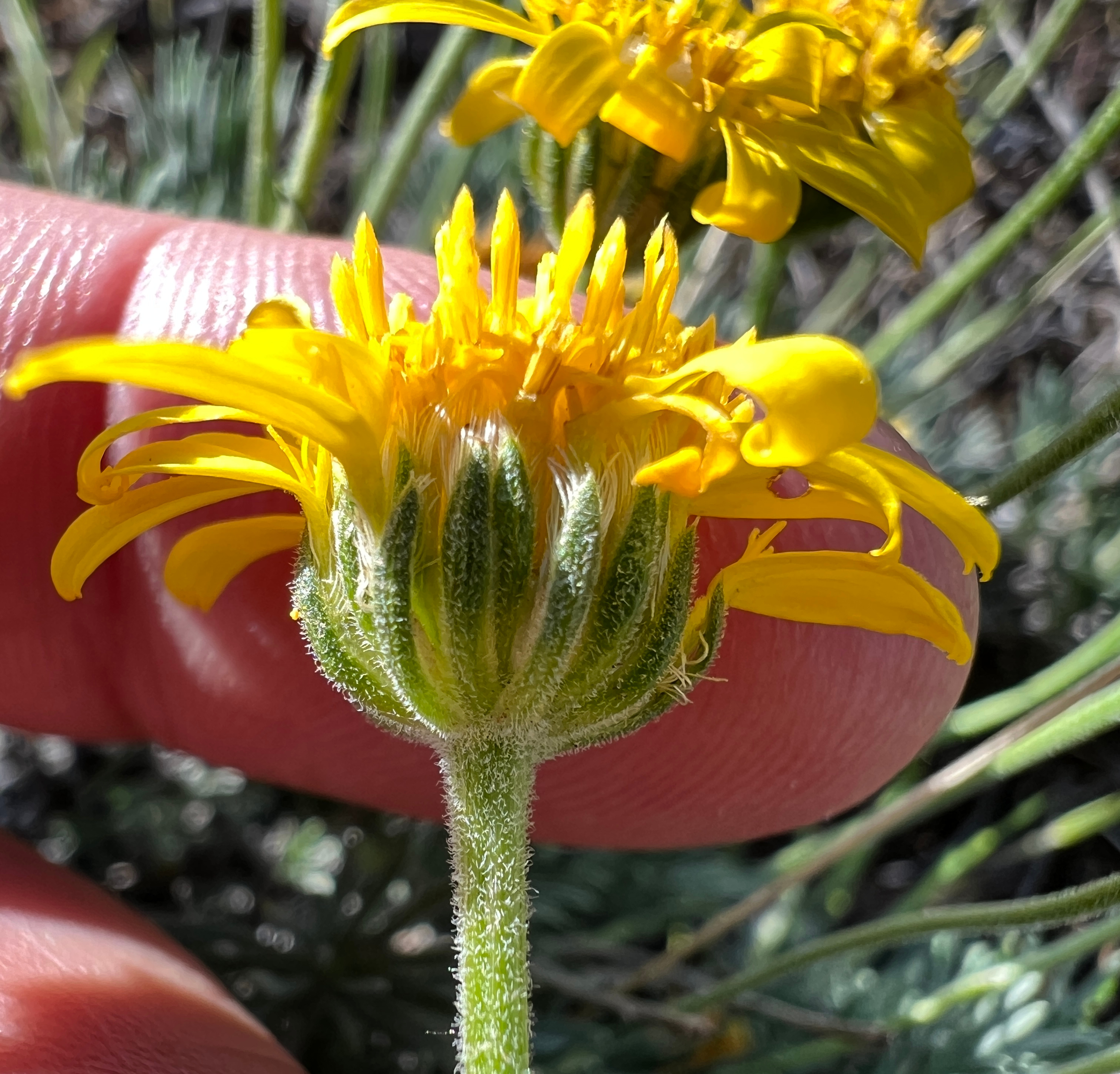
Floral bract
