= Vernon Orlando Bailey =

American naturalist

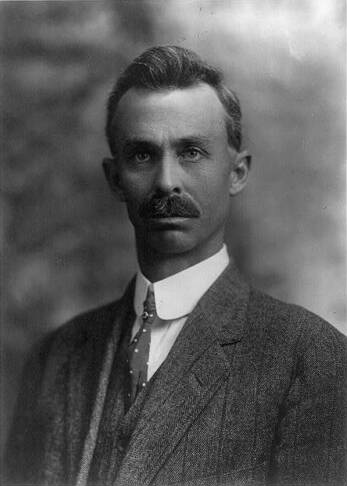
- Born: June 21, 1864; Manchester, Michigan, U.S.
- Died: April 20, 1942 (aged 77); Washington, DC, U.S.
- Known for: Research on animal trapping, beavers, rodents, coyotes, wolves, bobcats
- Spouse: Florence Merriam Bailey (m. 1899)
- Scientific career
- Fields: Mammalogy
- Workplaces: United States Department of Agriculture

Vernon Orlando Bailey (June 21, 1864 – April 20, 1942) was an American naturalist who specialized in mammalogy. He was employed by the Bureau of Biological Survey, United States Department of Agriculture (USDA). His contributions to the bureau numbered roughly 13,000 specimens, including many new species. Bailey published 244 monographs and articles during his career with the USDA and is best known for his biological surveys of Texas, New Mexico, North Dakota, and Oregon.

== Life and work ==
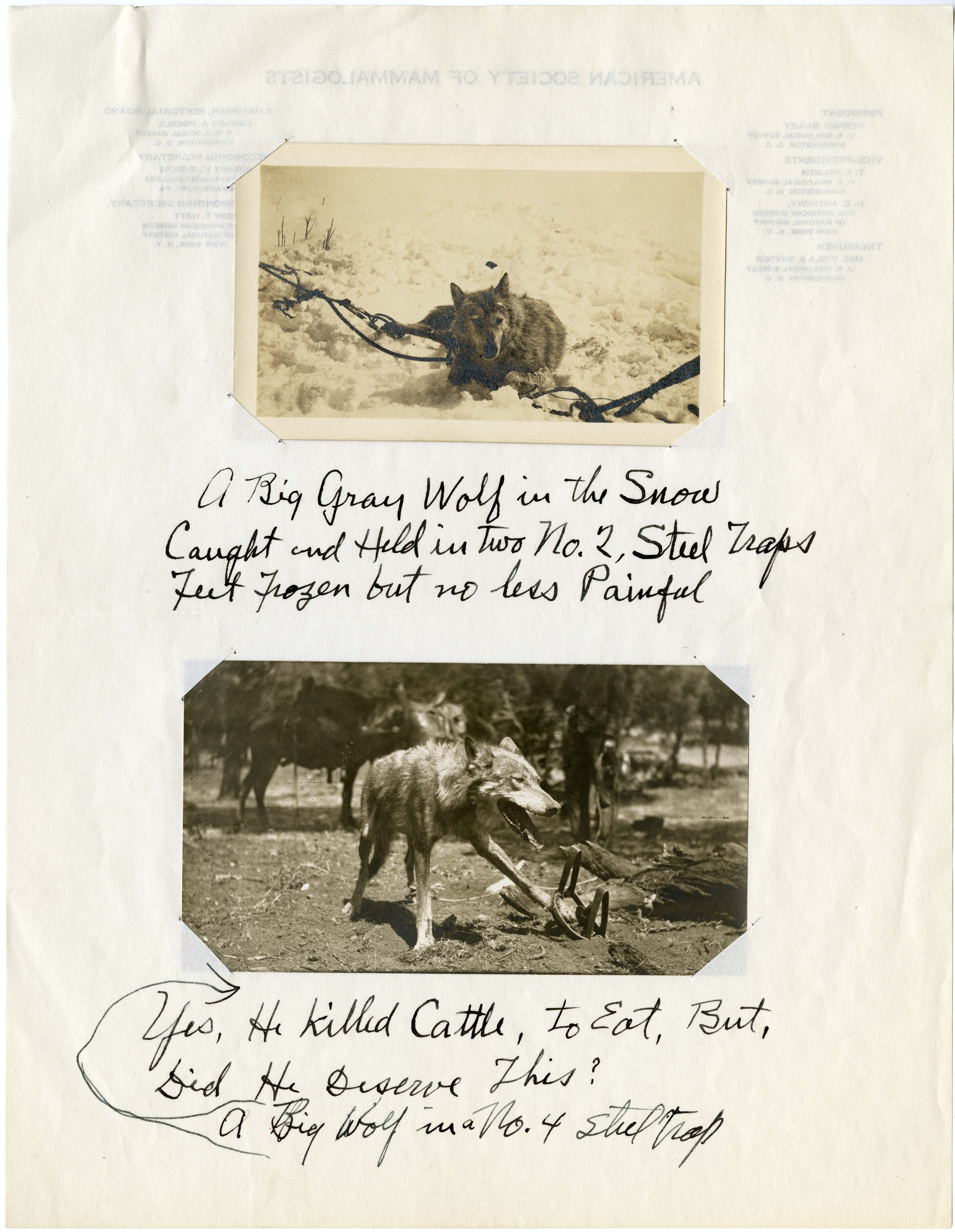
Photograph taken for Vernon Orlando Bailey during his work as field naturalist for the USDA Bureau of Biological Survey: Bailey was particularly interested in creating more humane animal traps and devoted much of his time after retirement to this cause.

The fourth child of Emily and Hiram Bailey, Vernon Orlando Bailey was born on June 21, 1864, in Manchester, Michigan. Bailey and his pioneer family moved by horse-drawn wagon to Elk River, Minnesota, in 1870. Hiram Bailey was a woodsman and a mason by trade, who taught his son how to hunt at an early age. Since no school was in the frontier town at the time, the Baileys schooled their children at home until several other local families and they established a school in 1873. Vernon briefly attended the University of Michigan and later Columbian University. While in Elk River, Bailey began collecting specimens and forwarding them to Dr. C. Hart Merriam, founder of the Bureau of Biological Survey (the predecessor to the current U.S. Fish and Wildlife Service). Bailey was appointed special field agent to the Division of Economic Ornithology and Mammalogy in 1887. By 1890, Bailey was awarded the title of chief field naturalist. He served in this position until his retirement in 1933. He was the president of the American Society of Mammalogists from 1933 to 1934, which he also had helped found in 1919.

During his career, his fieldwork focused on collecting and describing mammals but also included birds, reptiles, and plants. His efforts provided the bureau some 13,000 mammal specimens. In 1899, he married ornithologist Florence Augusta Merriam. The two traveled the United States together and separately collected and observed specimens in the field. They co-authored several articles, including "Cave Life of Kentucky" with Leonard Giovannoli, published in the September 1933 edition of American Midland Naturalist (vol. 14, no. 5).

== Legacy ==
Vernon Bailey Peak is a 6,672 ft (2,034 m) peak in Big Bend National Park in Texas.

== Publications ==
- The Prairie Ground Squirrels or Spermophiles of the Mississippi Valley, 1893
- Biological Survey of Texas, 1905
- A New Subspecies of Beaver from North Dakota, 1919-1920
- Beaver Habits, Beaver Control and Possibilities of Beaver Farming, 1922
- The Cave Life of Kentucky, The American Midland Naturalist, 1933

== Associated eponyms ==
- Lorandersonia baileyi Woot. & Standl.
- Ostrya baileyi Rose (Ostrya baileyi is a synonym for Ostrya knowltonii.)
- Tillandsia baileyi Rose ex Small
- Echinocereus baileyi Rose (This is now classified as a subspecies of Echinocereus reichenbachii.)
- Sarcobatus baileyi Coville.
- Yucca baileyi Woot. & Standl.
- Campanula baileyi Eastwood. (Campanula baileyi is a synonym for Campanula wilkinsiana.)
- Crotaphytus collaris baileyi Stejneger, 1890
- Canis lupus baileyi (Mexican wolf)

== See also ==
- Mount Bailey (Oregon)
