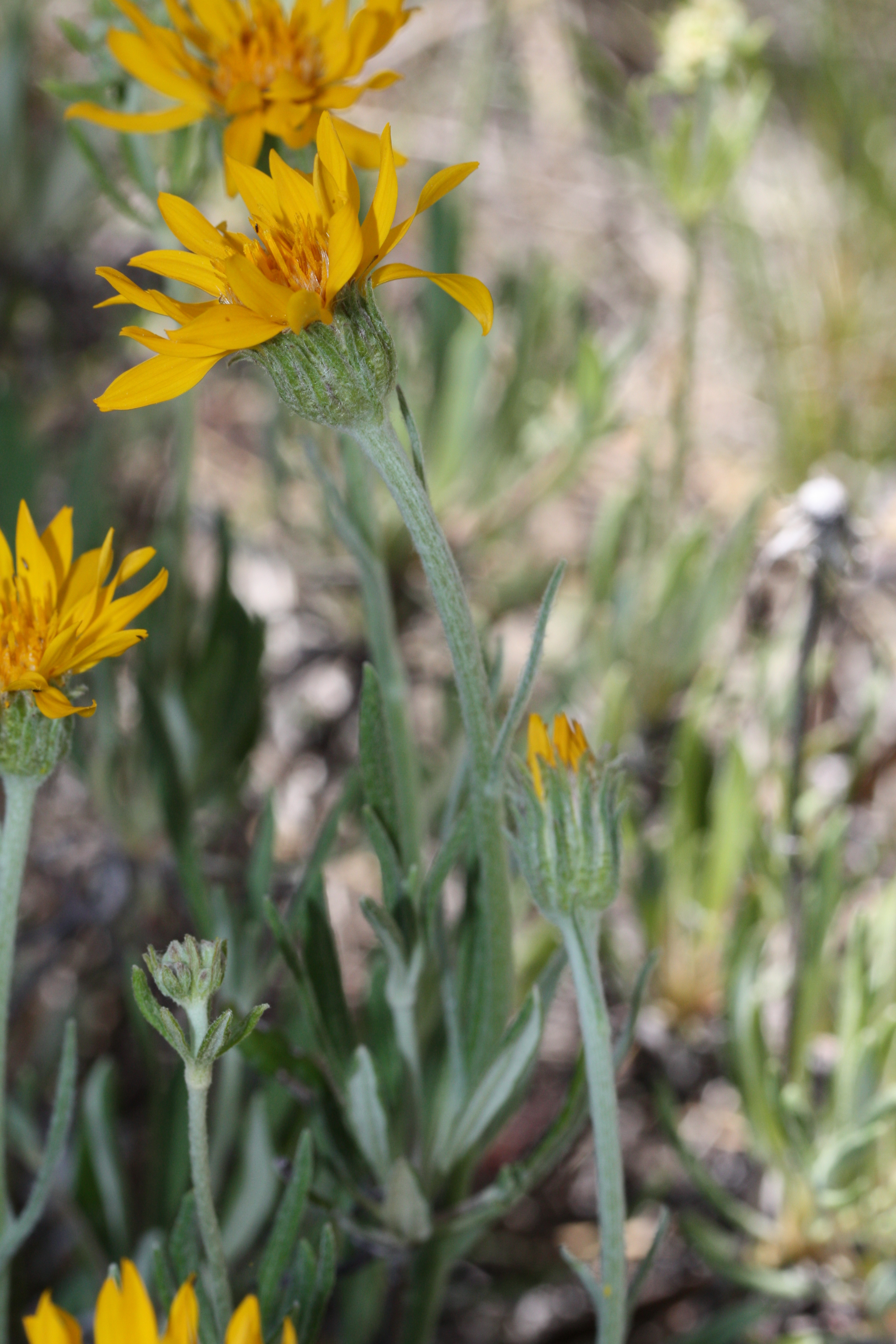

Scientific classification
- Kingdom: Plantae
- Clade: Tracheophytes
- Clade: Angiosperms
- Clade: Eudicots
- Clade: Asterids
- Order: Asterales
- Family: Asteraceae
- Genus: Stenotus
- Species: S. lanuginosus

Binomial name
- Stenotus lanuginosus (A.Gray) Greene

Synonyms
- Haplopappus lanuginosus

= Stenotus lanuginosus =

Species of flowering plant

Stenotus lanuginosus is a species of flowering plant in the family Asteraceae known by the common names woolly mock goldenweed and woolly stenotus.

== Distribution ==
The plant is endemic to the western United States, especially the Great Basin region of the inland Pacific Northwest, northeastern California, and northern Nevada. It grows in cold, dry regions such as sagebrush plateau and high mountain slopes in subalpine and alpine climates.

== Description ==
Stenotus lanuginosus is a perennial herb usually forming a compact tuft of herbage with a fibrous root system. The leaves are linear to widely lance-shaped and measure up to 10 centimeters long. They are coated in white woolly fibers and are generally glandular.

The inflorescence is a solitary flower head with woolly or hairy green phyllaries. The flower head contains yellow disc florets and several yellow ray florets, each about a centimeter long.
