= Nestotus macleanii =

Scientific classification
- Kingdom: Plantae
- Clade: Tracheophytes
- Clade: Angiosperms
- Clade: Eudicots
- Clade: Asterids
- Order: Asterales
- Family: Asteraceae
- Genus: Nestotus
- Species: N. macleanii

Binomial name
- Nestotus macleanii (Brandegee) R.P. Roberts, Urbatsch & Neubig

Species of plant

Nestotus macleanii, also known as the Yukon goldenweed, is a species of plant in the genus Nestotus. It is endemic to the Yukon, Canada. According to NatureServe, it is vulnerable but not currently at risk.
