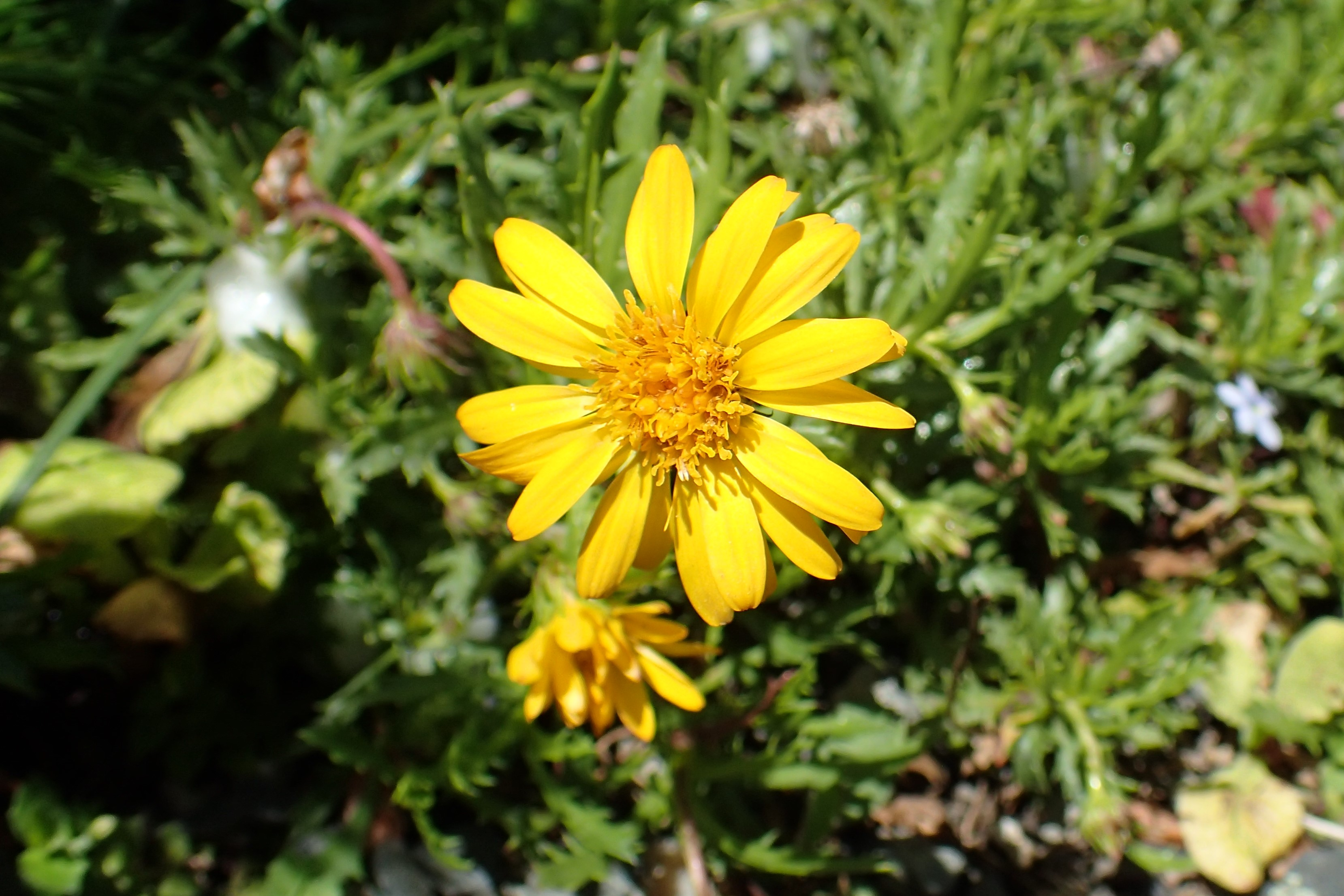

Scientific classification
- Kingdom: Plantae
- Clade: Tracheophytes
- Clade: Angiosperms
- Clade: Eudicots
- Clade: Asterids
- Order: Asterales
- Family: Asteraceae
- Genus: Haplopappus
- Species: H. glutinosus

Binomial name
- Haplopappus glutinosus Cass.

= Haplopappus glutinosus =

Species of flowering plant

Haplopappus glutinosus, known also by the common name sticky haplopappus is a species of plant in the genus Haplopappus in the family Asteraceae. It is native to Chile and Argentina. Haplopappus is derived from Greek and means 'single-down' or 'single feather'. The name is in reference to the single pappus attached to each seed. Glutinosus means 'sticky', 'glutinous', 'viscous', or 'glue-bearing'.

Haplopappus glutinosus is an evergreen perennial which forms a cushion. Its leaves are sticky, which is the basis for its species name (glutinosus is a cognate of 'glutinous'). In summer, it bears yellow daisy-like flowers which reach up to 2.5 centimeters in diameter.
