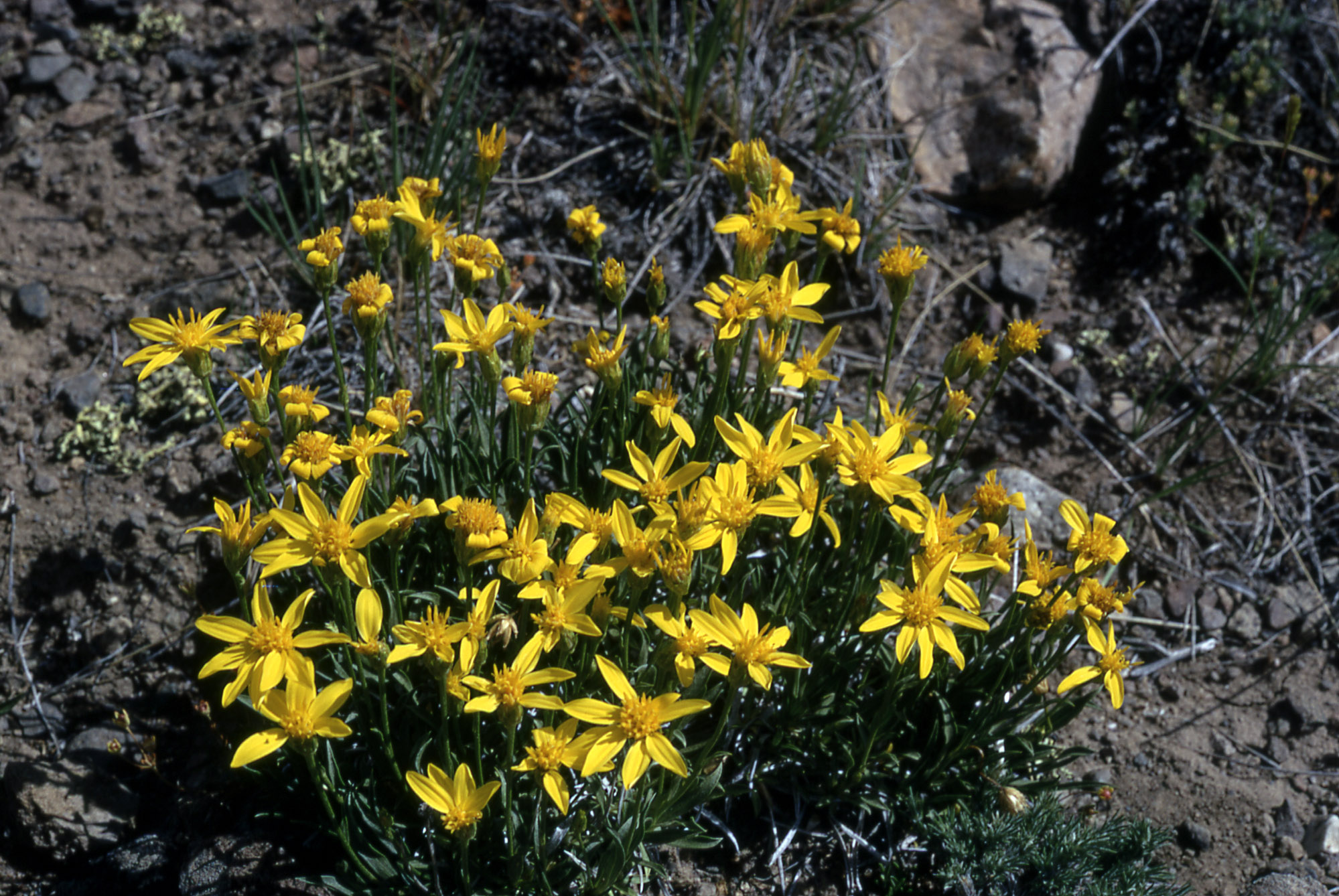

Conservation status
- Secure (NatureServe)

Scientific classification
- Kingdom: Plantae
- Clade: Embryophytes
- Clade: Tracheophytes
- Clade: Spermatophytes
- Clade: Angiosperms
- Clade: Eudicots
- Clade: Asterids
- Order: Asterales
- Family: Asteraceae
- Genus: Stenotus
- Species: S. acaulis

Binomial name
- Stenotus acaulis Nutt.

= Stenotus acaulis =

Species of flowering plant

Stenotus acaulis is a species of flowering plant in the family Asteraceae known by the common name stemless mock goldenweed.

It is native to the western United States, where it grows in rocky soils in sagebrush plateau and mountain habitats.

== Description ==
Stenotus acaulis is a perennial herb usually forming a compact tuft or mat of hairless to hairy and sometimes glandular herbage. The linear to widely lance-shaped leaves are up to 5 centimetres (2 in) long with three veins.

The inflorescence is a solitary 4-cm flower head or small cluster of a few heads. The flower head contains yellow disc florets and 6–15 yellow ray florets each about 1.5 cm long; the bracts are pointed.

=== Similar species ===
S. armerioides is similar but the tips of its bracts are round.
