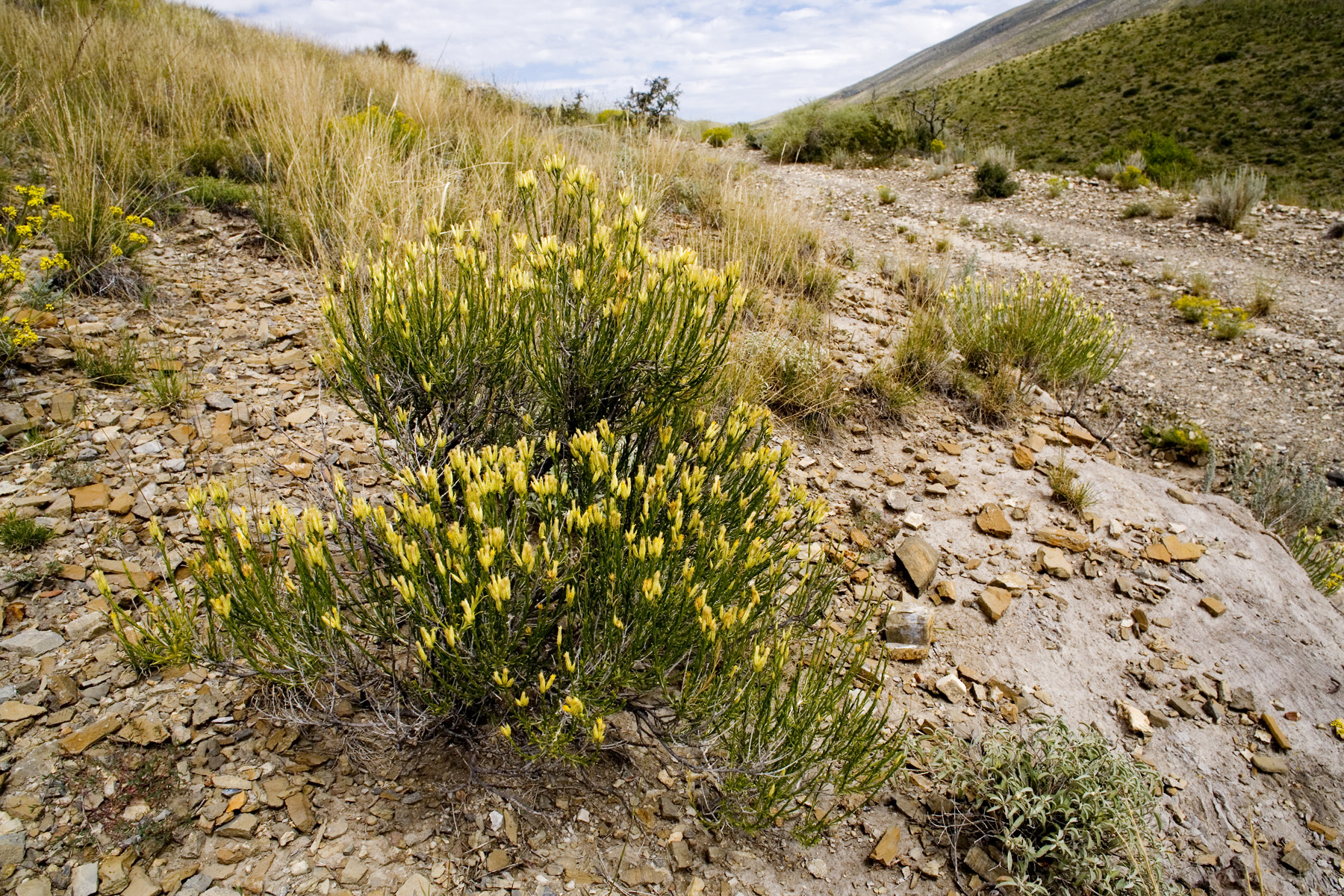
- Lorandersonia baileyi Doña Ana County, New Mexico

Conservation status
- Apparently Secure (NatureServe)

Scientific classification
- Kingdom: Plantae
- Clade: Tracheophytes
- Clade: Angiosperms
- Clade: Eudicots
- Clade: Asterids
- Order: Asterales
- Family: Asteraceae
- Genus: Lorandersonia
- Species: L. baileyi

Binomial name
- Lorandersonia baileyi (Wooton & Standl.) Urbatsch, R.P. Roberts & Neubig

Synonyms
- Chrysothamnus baileyi Wooton & Standl.; Chrysothamnus pulchellus subsp. baileyi (Wooton & Standl.) H.M.Hall & Clem.; Chrysothamnus pulchellus var. baileyi (Wooton & Standl.) S.F.Blake; Ericameria pulchella subsp. baileyi (Wooton & Standl.) L.C.Anderson

= Lorandersonia baileyi =

Species of flowering plant

Lorandersonia baileyi (Bailey's rabbitbrush), is a North American species of flowering plants in the tribe Astereae within the family Asteraceae. It was initially discovered in the Guadalupe Mountains of New Mexico in 1902, and has since been collected in Arizona, Utah, Colorado, Kansas, Oklahoma, Texas, Chihuahua, Coahuila, and Nuevo León.

Lorandersonia baileyi is a branching shrub up to 70 cm (28 inches) tall. It has many small yellow flower heads, each with about 5 disc florets but no ray florets.

== See also ==
- Vernon Orlando Bailey
