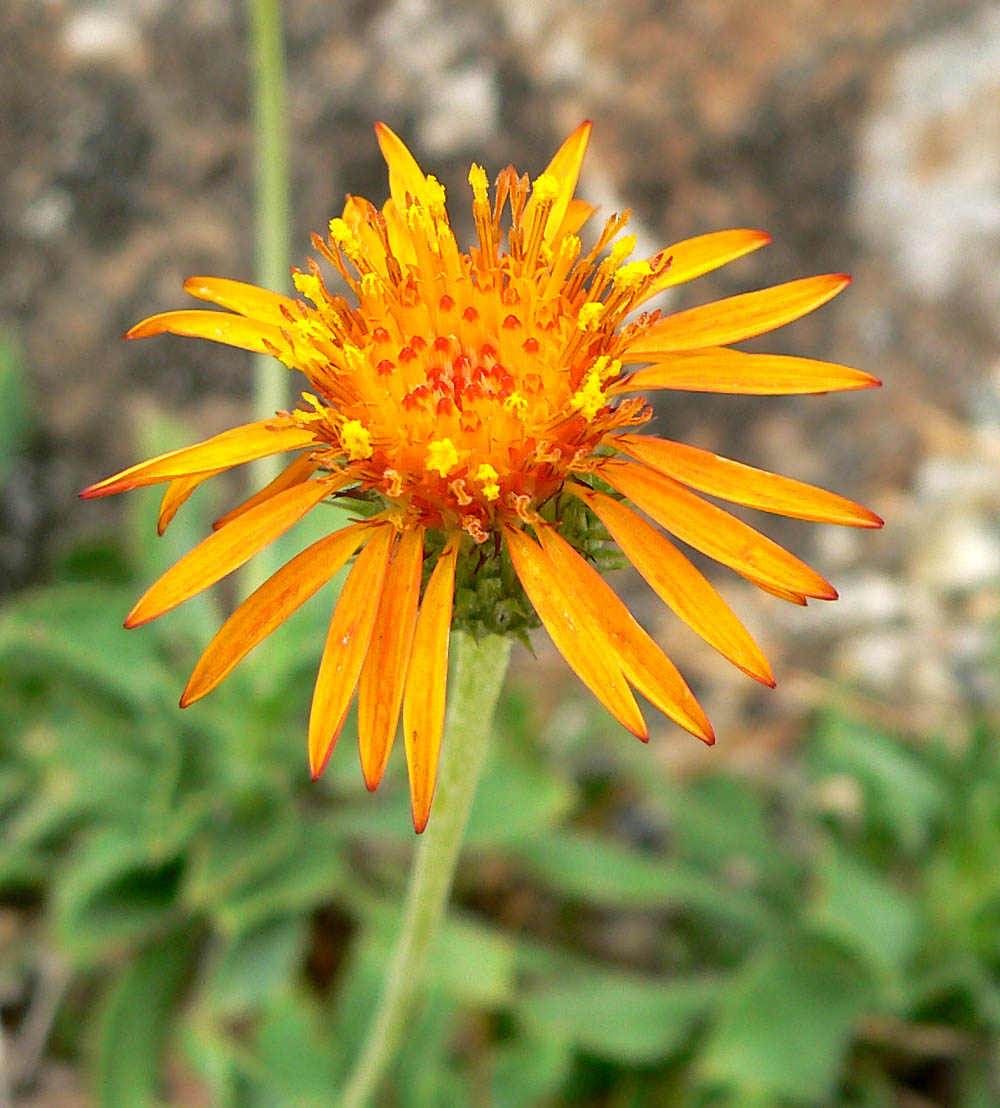

Scientific classification
- Kingdom: Plantae
- Clade: Tracheophytes
- Clade: Angiosperms
- Clade: Eudicots
- Clade: Asterids
- Order: Asterales
- Family: Asteraceae
- Genus: Haplopappus
- Species: H. foliosus

Binomial name
- Haplopappus foliosus DC.

= Haplopappus foliosus =

Species of plant

Haplopappus foliosus is a species of flowering plant in the family Asteraceae that is endemic to Chile.

== Description and ecology ==
It grows in coastal areas, including the mountains at an elevation of 500–2,000 metres (1,600–6,600 ft). The species is used for ornaments, the inflorescences of which are yellow in colour and have around 14 florets.
