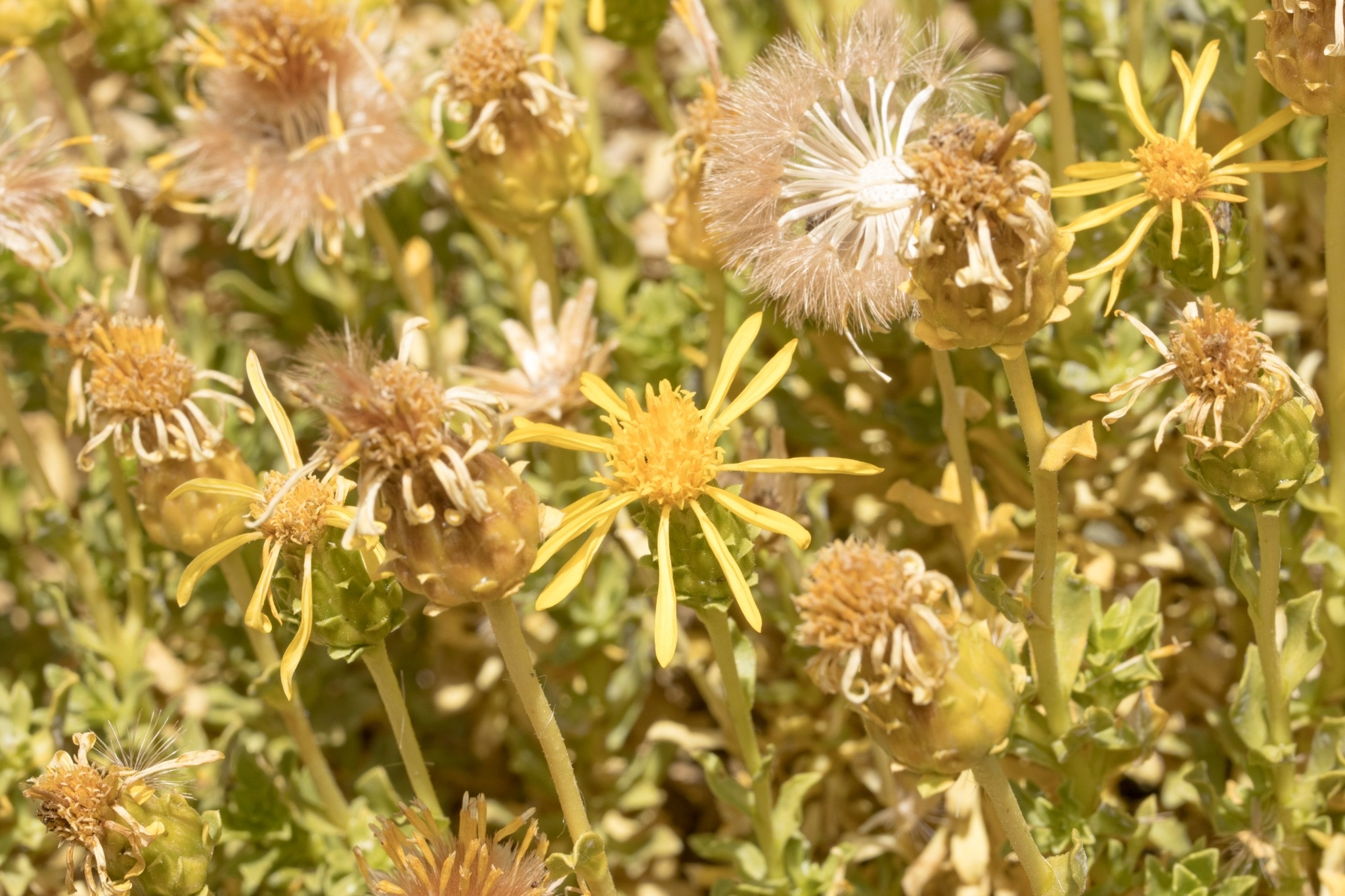

Scientific classification
- Kingdom: Plantae
- Clade: Embryophytes
- Clade: Tracheophytes
- Clade: Spermatophytes
- Clade: Angiosperms
- Clade: Eudicots
- Clade: Asterids
- Order: Asterales
- Family: Asteraceae
- Genus: Haplopappus
- Species: H. baylahuen

Binomial name
- Haplopappus baylahuen J. Remy

= Haplopappus baylahuen =

Species of flowering plant

Haplopappus baylahuen, locally known as bailahuen, is a species of flowering plant in the family Asteraceae. It is a shrub native to Chile and Argentina. In Chile, it can be found in the Atacama and Coquimbo regions. The plant is consumed as an herbal tea and, in folk medicine, it is regarded as useful for intestinal and liver diseases. Although the chemical profile of the plant has been studied, there is no proof of any therapeutic effect.
