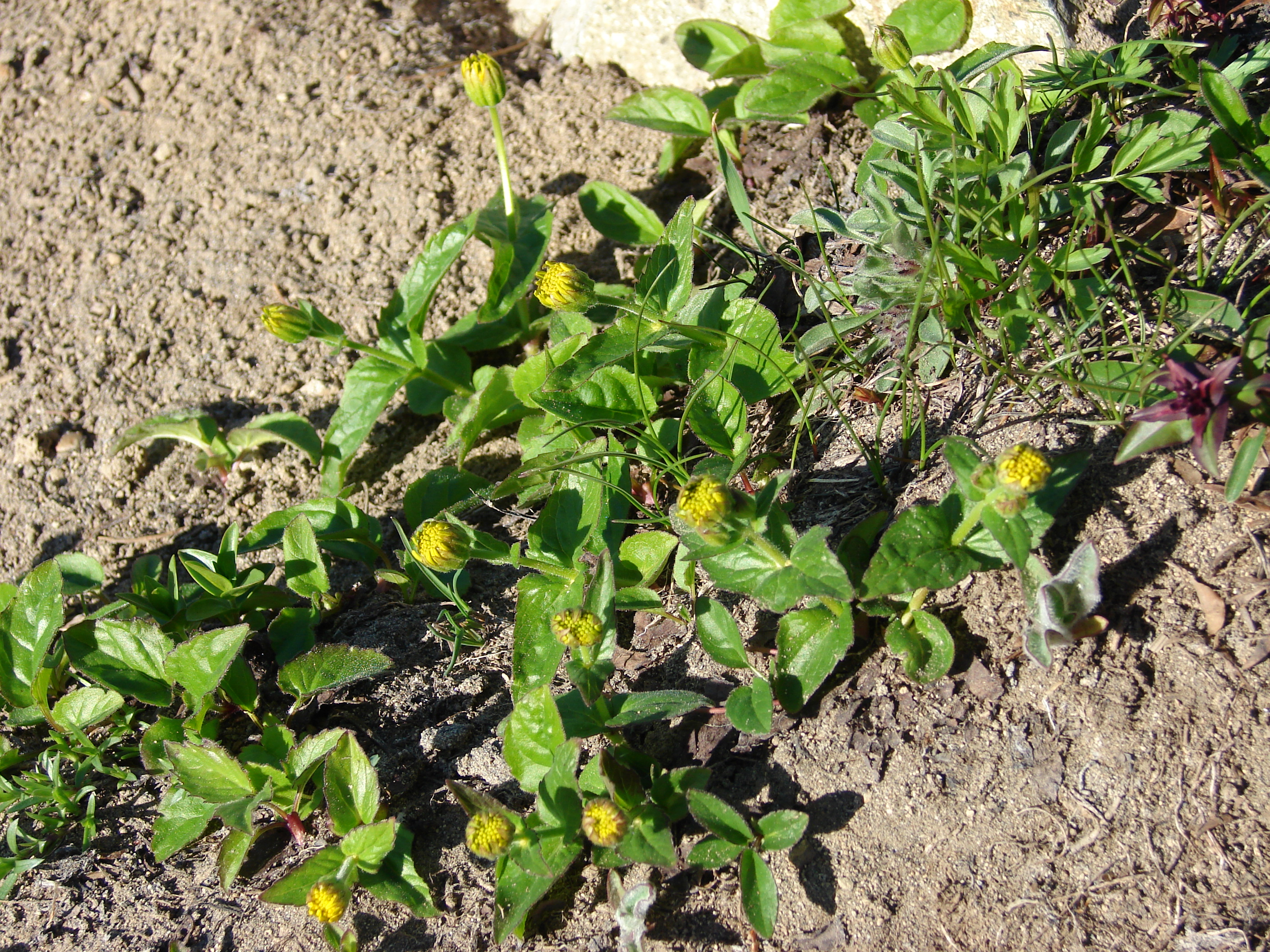

Conservation status
- Secure (NatureServe)

Scientific classification
- Kingdom: Plantae
- Clade: Tracheophytes
- Clade: Angiosperms
- Clade: Eudicots
- Clade: Asterids
- Order: Asterales
- Family: Asteraceae
- Genus: Tonestus
- Species: T. lyallii

Binomial name
- Tonestus lyallii (A.Gray) A.Nelson

Synonyms
- Haplopappus lyallii

= Tonestus lyallii =

Species of plant

Tonestus lyallii is a species of flowering plant in the family Asteraceae known by the common names Lyall's goldenweed, Lyall's serpentweed and Lyall's tonestus. It is native to western North America, particularly in the Rocky Mountains and the mountain ranges of the Pacific Northwest with scattered occurrences between. It is a perennial herb growing in clumps or short bunches not more than about 15 centimeters tall, the stem branching from a tough caudex. The leaves are smooth-edged and linear or lance-shaped, the largest at the base of the plant reaching up to about 8 centimeters long. The inflorescence is a single flower head or a pair of heads each about a centimeter wide with green or red phyllaries. The head bears at least 10 or 11 bright yellow ray florets around a center containing many tubular disc florets.
