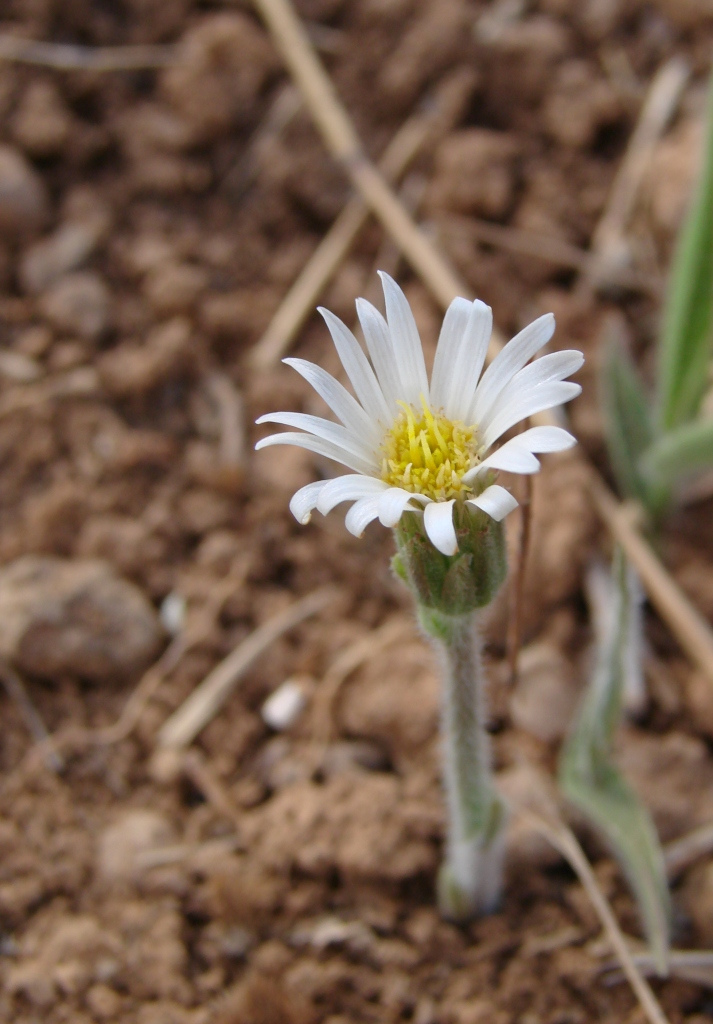
- Inulopsis camporum

Scientific classification
- Kingdom: Plantae
- Clade: Tracheophytes
- Clade: Angiosperms
- Clade: Eudicots
- Clade: Asterids
- Order: Asterales
- Family: Asteraceae
- Subfamily: Asteroideae
- Tribe: Astereae
- Subtribe: Baccharidinae
- Genus: Inulopsis; O. Hoffmann in Engler & Prantl

Synonyms
- Haplopappus sect. Inulopsis DC.

= Inulopsis =

Genus of flowering plants

Inulopsis is a genus of South American flowering plants in the family Asteraceae.

Species

- Inulopsis camporum (Gardner) G.L.Nesom - Brazil, Bolivia
- Inulopsis scaposa (DC.) O.Hoffm. - Brazil, Paraguay
- Inulopsis stenophylla Dusén - Brazil
