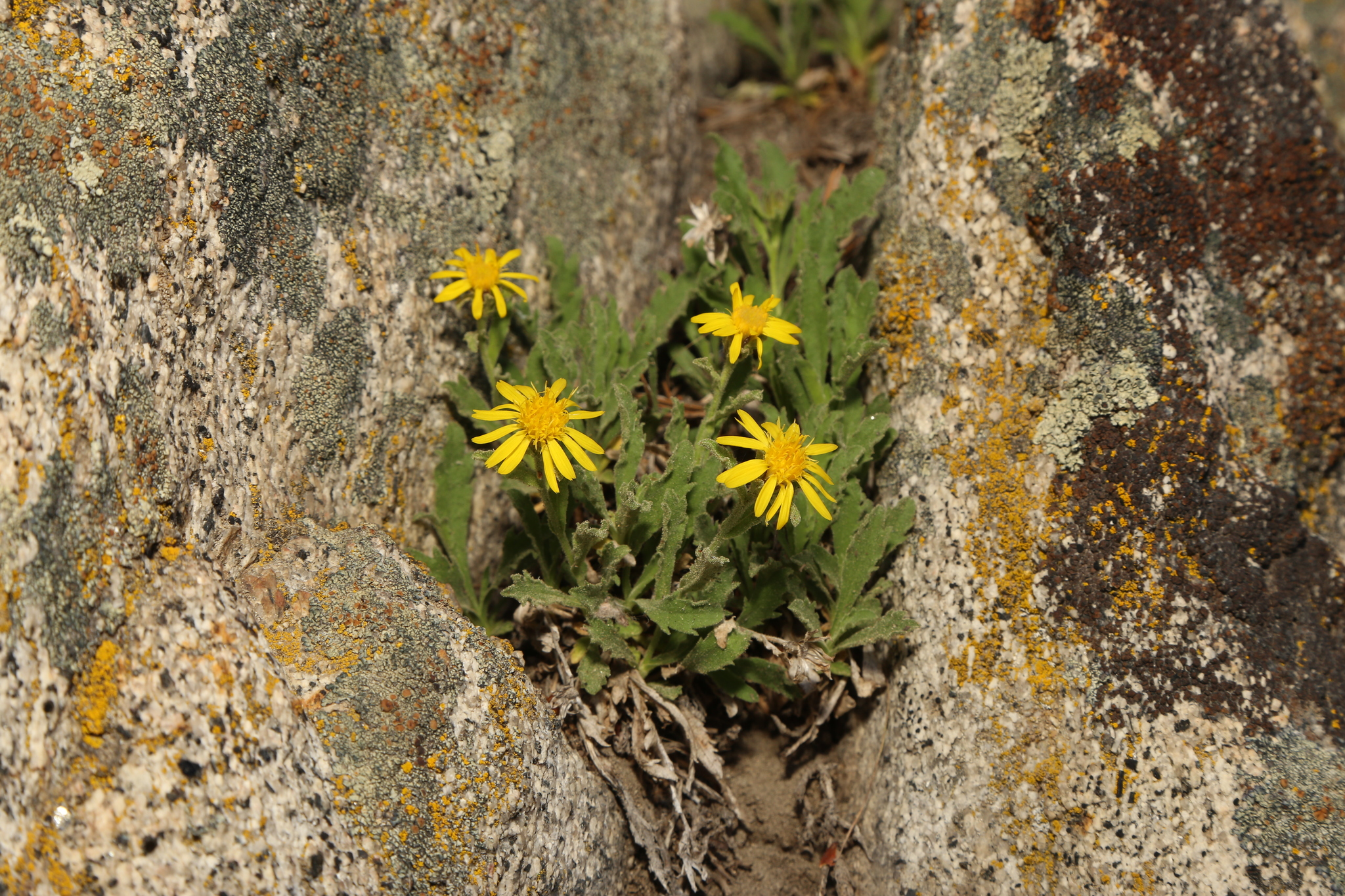

Scientific classification
- Kingdom: Plantae
- Clade: Tracheophytes
- Clade: Angiosperms
- Clade: Eudicots
- Clade: Asterids
- Order: Asterales
- Family: Asteraceae
- Genus: Toiyabea
- Species: T. eximia

Binomial name
- Toiyabea eximia (H.M.Hall) G.L.Nesom

Synonyms
- Haplopappus eximius H.M.Hall; Haplopappus eximius subsp. typicus D.D.Keck, not validly publ.; Tonestus eximius A.Nelson & J.F.Macbr.

= Toiyabea eximia =

Species of plant

Toiyabea eximia is a species of flowering plant in the family Asteraceae known by the common names Lake Tahoe serpentweed and Tahoe tonestus. It is native to the High Sierra Nevada, where it is known only from the vicinity of Lake Tahoe on the California-Nevada border. It grows in alpine and subalpine mountain habitats. It is a short, clumpy perennial herb growing up to 13 centimeters tall. The thick stems are hairless and glandular, the lower parts covered in the withered leaf bases of previous seasons' growth. The toothed or serrated leaf blades are up to 3 to 5 centimeters in length. The inflorescence is a single flower head or a cluster of a few heads. Each is 1 to 1.5 centimeters wide with green phyllaries. The head bears at least 10 bright yellow ray florets around a center containing many tubular disc florets.
