= Aztecaster =

Scientific classification
- Kingdom: Plantae
- Clade: Embryophytes
- Clade: Tracheophytes
- Clade: Angiosperms
- Clade: Eudicots
- Clade: Asterids
- Order: Asterales
- Family: Asteraceae
- Subfamily: Asteroideae
- Tribe: Astereae
- Subtribe: Baccharidinae
- Genus: Aztecaster; G.L.Nesom

Type species
- Aztecaster pyramidatus (B.L.Rob. & Greenm.) G.L.Nesom

Genus of flowering plants

Aztecaster is a genus of Mexican flowering plants in the family Asteraceae.

Species

- Aztecaster matudae (Rzed.) G.L.Nesom - Nuevo León, Coahuila, Zacatecas, San Luis Potosí
- Aztecaster pyramidatus (B.L.Rob. & Greenm.) G.L.Nesom - Oaxaca
