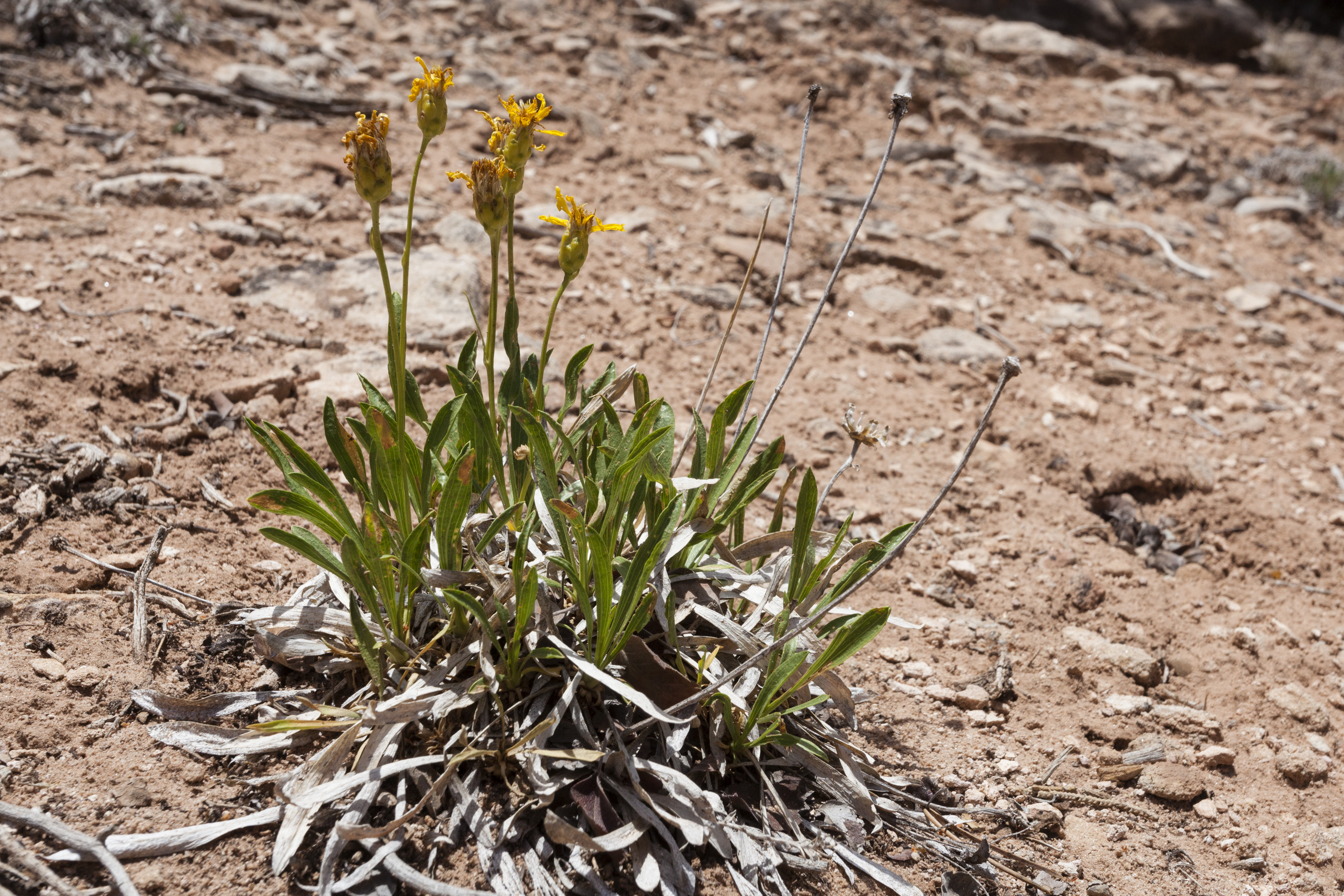
- In Colorado

Conservation status
- Apparently Secure (NatureServe)

Scientific classification
- Kingdom: Plantae
- Clade: Tracheophytes
- Clade: Angiosperms
- Clade: Eudicots
- Clade: Asterids
- Order: Asterales
- Family: Asteraceae
- Genus: Stenotus
- Species: S. armerioides

Binomial name
- Stenotus armerioides Nutt.

Synonyms
- Haplopappus armerioides (Nutt.) A.Gray

= Stenotus armerioides =

Species of flowering plant

Stenotus armerioides, the thrift mock goldenweed, is a perennial plant in the family Asteraceae.

The plant is native to areas of the Western United States and to Saskatchewan, Canada. It is found in the Colorado Plateau and Canyonlands region.
