= Osbertia =

Scientific classification
- Kingdom: Plantae
- Clade: Tracheophytes
- Clade: Angiosperms
- Clade: Eudicots
- Clade: Asterids
- Order: Asterales
- Family: Asteraceae
- Subfamily: Asteroideae
- Tribe: Astereae
- Subtribe: Chrysopsidinae
- Genus: Osbertia; Greene

Type species
- Haplopappus stolonifer DC.

Genus of plants

Osbertia is a genus of Mesoamerican flowering plants in the family Asteraceae.

Species

- Osbertia bartlettii (S.F.Blake) G.L.Nesom - Nuevo León, Tamaulipas
- Osbertia chihuahuana B.L.Turner & S.D.Sundb. - Chihuahua
- Osbertia heleniastrum (Greene) Greene - State of México
- Osbertia stolonifera (DC.) Greene - Chiapas, Oaxaca, Guatemala
