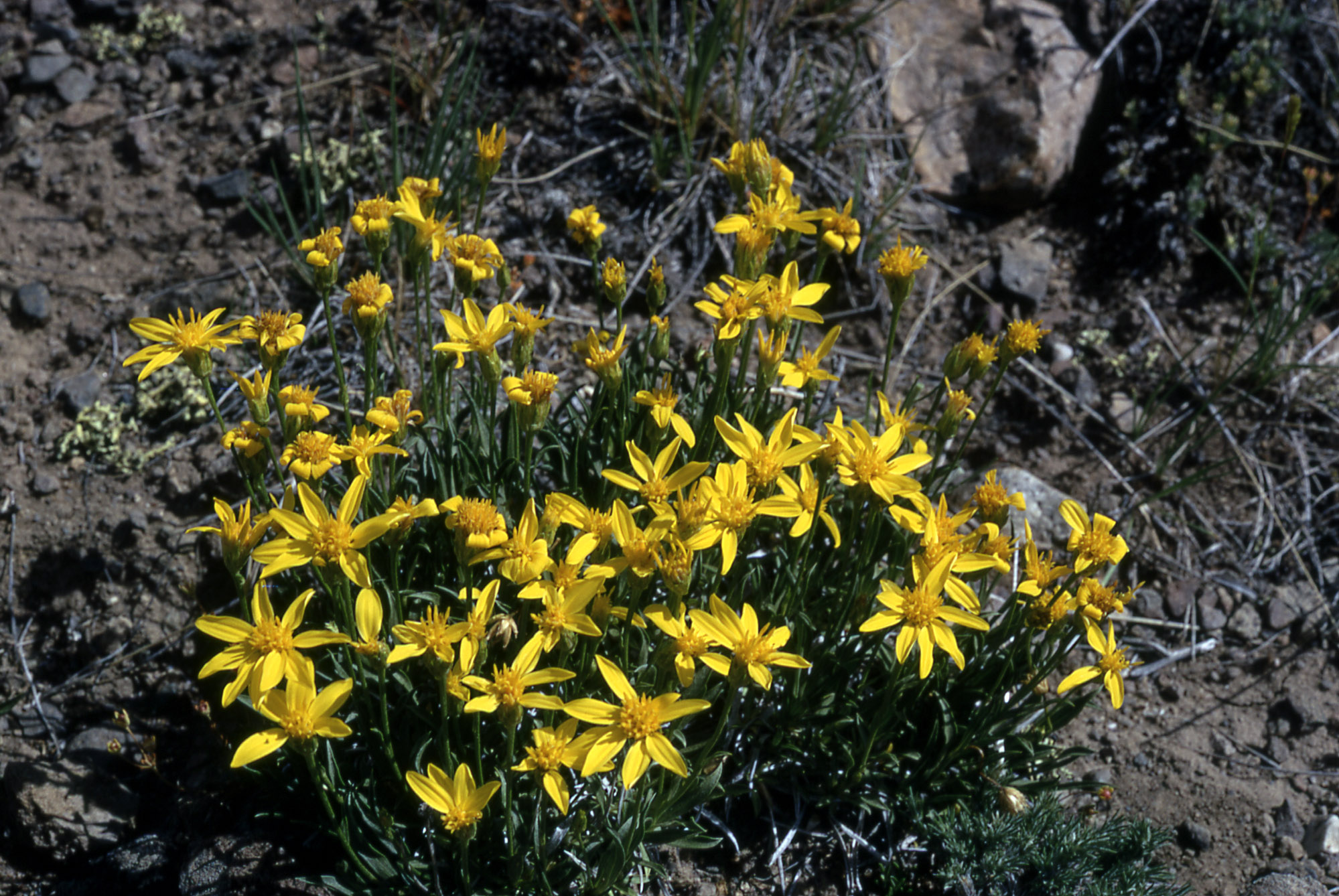
- Stenotus acaulis

Scientific classification
- Kingdom: Plantae
- Clade: Tracheophytes
- Clade: Angiosperms
- Clade: Eudicots
- Clade: Asterids
- Order: Asterales
- Family: Asteraceae
- Subfamily: Asteroideae
- Tribe: Astereae
- Subtribe: Solidagininae
- Genus: Stenotus; Nutt.

Synonyms
- Haplopappus sect. Stenotus (Nutt.) A.Gray

= Stenotus (plant) =

Genus of flowering plants

Stenotus is a genus of flowering plants in the family Asteraceae. There are four species, all native to western North America. They are known commonly as mock goldenweeds.

These are perennial herbs sometimes forming mats or clumps a few centimeters high, producing erect stems up to about 30 centimeters tall but known to reach 60 centimeters at times. They grow from a taproot and branching caudex. The stems and foliage are hairless to quite woolly, and nonglandular to glandular-hairy. The leaf blades are linear to widely lance-shaped, white near the bases and green or grayish toward the tips. The flower head is solitary, paired, or in an array of up to four. There are yellow disc florets and usually yellow ray florets. The fruit has a pappus of fine white bristles.

The names of two related genera were coined because they are anagrams of the name Stenotus: Nestotus and Tonestus.

Species

- Stenotus acaulis (Nutt.) Nutt. – stemless mock goldenweed, stemless goldenweed - CA NV AZ UT CO WY ID OR MT, Alberta
- Stenotus armerioides Nutt. – thrift mock goldenweed, thrifty goldenweed - AZ NM CO WY MT KS NE SD ND Saskatchewan
- Stenotus lanuginosus (A.Gray) Greene – woolly mock goldenweed, woolly goldenweed - CA NV OR WA ID MT
- Stenotus pulvinatus (Moran) G.L. Nesom - Baja California

formerly included

Several species once included in Stenotus are now considered to belong to other genera, including Ericameria, Erigeron, Nestotus, Oonopsis, Tonestus, and Townsendia.
