= Toiyabea alpina =

Scientific classification
- Kingdom: Plantae
- Clade: Tracheophytes
- Clade: Angiosperms
- Clade: Eudicots
- Clade: Asterids
- Order: Asterales
- Family: Asteraceae
- Genus: Toiyabea
- Species: T. alpina

Binomial name
- Toiyabea alpina (L.C. Anderson & Goodrich) R.P. Roberts, Urbatsch & Neubig

Synonyms
- Haplopappus alpinus L.C. Anderson & Goodrich; Tonestus alpinus (L.C.Anderson & Goodrich) G.L.Nesom & D.R.Morgan

Genus of plants

Toiyabea alpina, the alpine serpentweed, is a species of North American plants in the tribe Astereae within the family Asteraceae. It is native to the Toiyabe and Toquima Mountains of central Nevada (Nye and Lander Counties).
