= Toiyabea granitica =

Scientific classification
- Kingdom: Plantae
- Clade: Tracheophytes
- Clade: Angiosperms
- Clade: Eudicots
- Clade: Asterids
- Order: Asterales
- Family: Asteraceae
- Genus: Toiyabea
- Species: T. granitica

Binomial name
- Toiyabea granitica (Tiehm & L.M. Shultz) G.L. Nesom

Synonyms
- Haplopappus graniticus Tiehm & L.M. Shultz; Tonestus graniticus (Tiehm & L.M.Shultz) G.L.Nesom & D.R.Morgan

Species of plant

Toiyabea granitica, common names granite serpentweed and Lone Mountain serpentweed, is a rare endemic plant species known only from the east side of Lone Mountain in Esmeralda County, Nevada, about 20 km (12.5 miles) west of Tonopah. It grows there in the crevices of granitic outcrops.

Toiyabea granitica is a perennial herb growing close to the ground and forming mats. Leaves are ovate to spatulate, irregularly toothed, up to 4 cm (1.6 inches) long. Flower heads are born in racemose or corymbiform arrays. There are no ray flowers, but up to 23 yellow disc flowers.
