= Leptostelma =

Scientific classification
- Kingdom: Plantae
- Clade: Tracheophytes
- Clade: Angiosperms
- Clade: Eudicots
- Clade: Asterids
- Order: Asterales
- Family: Asteraceae
- Subfamily: Asteroideae
- Tribe: Astereae
- Subtribe: Conyzinae
- Genus: Leptostelma; D.Don

Genus of flowering plants

Leptostelma is a genus of South American flowering plants in the family Asteraceae.

Species

- Leptostelma camposportoi (Cabrera) A.M.Teles & Sobral - Rio de Janeiro
- Leptostelma catharinensis (Cabrera) A.M.Teles & Sobral - Santa Catarina
- Leptostelma maximum D.Don - Bolivia
- Leptostelma meyeri (Cabrera) A.M.Teles - Chaco, Entre Rios
- Leptostelma tucumanense (Cabrera) A.M.Teles - Catamarca, Tucuman
- Leptostelma tweediei (Hook. & Arn.) D.J.N.Hind & G.L.Nesom - Brazil, Bolivia, Paraguay, Uruguay, Argentina
