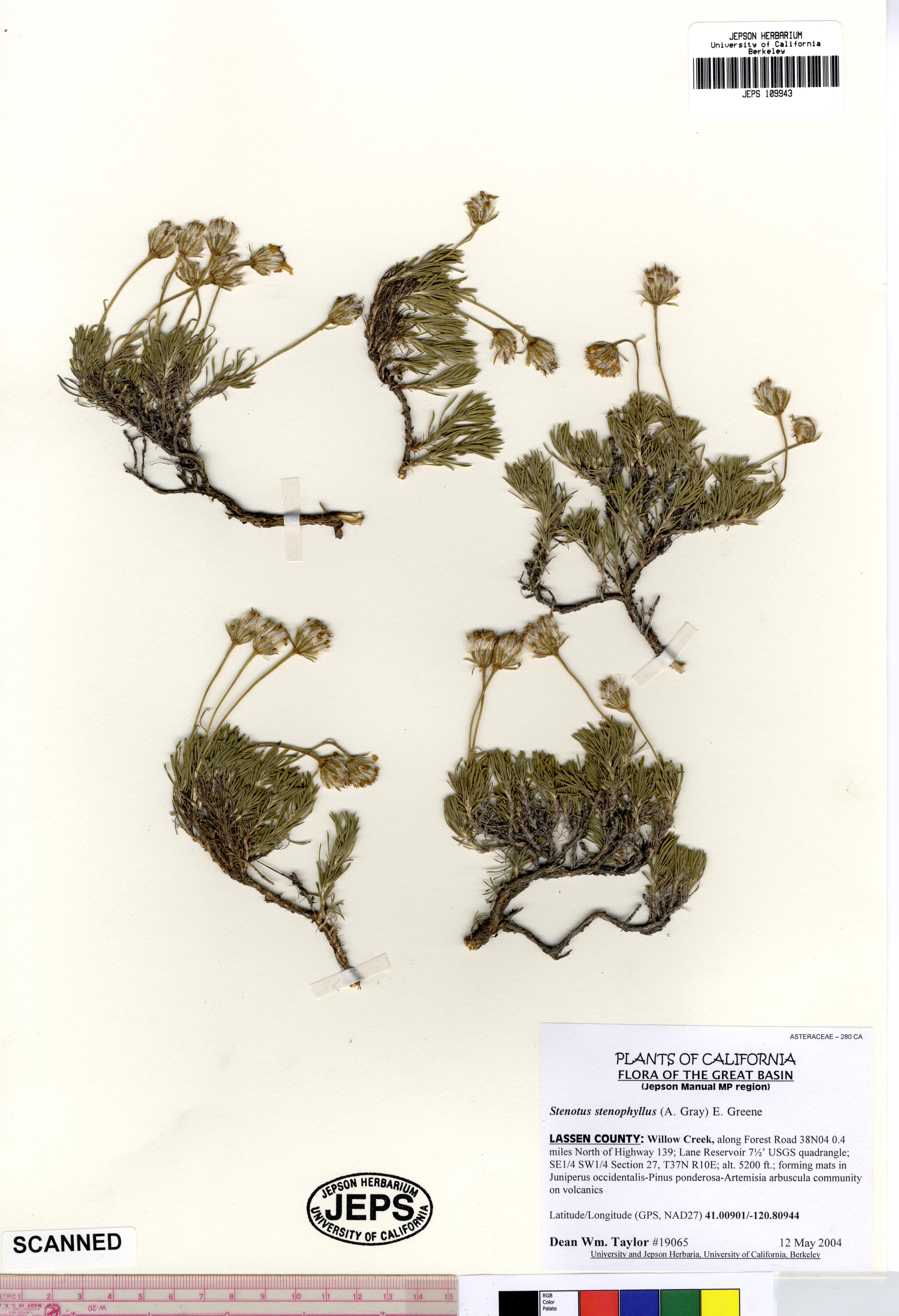
- Nestotus stenophyllus herbarium specimen from Lassen County, California

Scientific classification
- Kingdom: Plantae
- Clade: Tracheophytes
- Clade: Angiosperms
- Clade: Eudicots
- Clade: Asterids
- Order: Asterales
- Family: Asteraceae
- Subfamily: Asteroideae
- Tribe: Astereae
- Subtribe: Solidagininae
- Genus: Nestotus; R.P.Roberts, Urbatsch & Neubig

Type species
- Haplopappus stenophyllus A.Gray

= Nestotus =

Genus of flowering plants

Nestotus is a genus of flowering plants in the family Asteraceae.

The name Nestotus was chosen because it is an anagram of the name of the related genus Stenotus. Tonestus is similarly another anagram of the same name.

Species

- Nestotus macleanii (Brandegee) R.P.Roberts, Urbatsch & Neubig - Yukon Territory
- Nestotus stenophyllus (A.Gray) R.P.Roberts, Urbatsch & Neubig - California, Nevada, Oregon, Idaho, Washington
