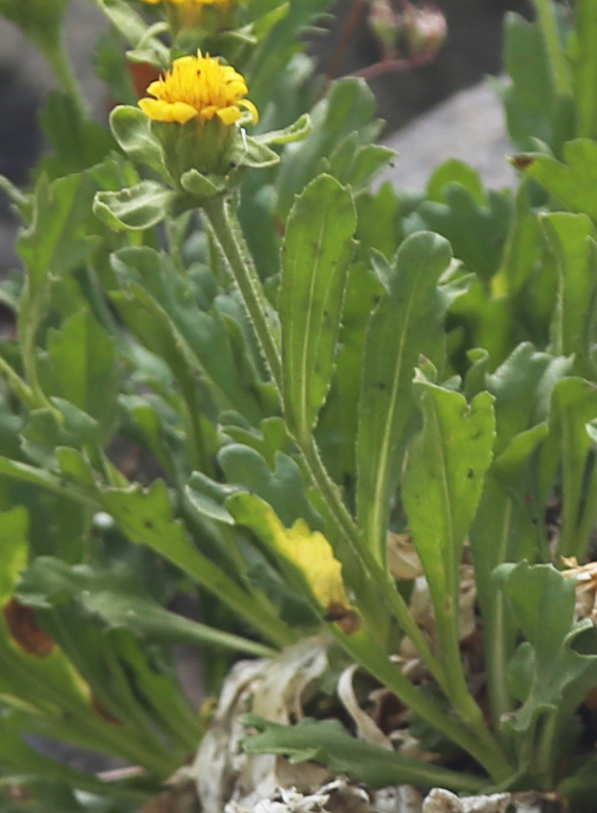
- Tonestus peirsonii in the Sierra Nevada, California

Scientific classification
- Kingdom: Plantae
- Clade: Tracheophytes
- Clade: Angiosperms
- Clade: Eudicots
- Clade: Asterids
- Order: Asterales
- Family: Asteraceae
- Subfamily: Asteroideae
- Tribe: Astereae
- Subtribe: Solidagininae
- Genus: Toiyabea; R.P.Roberts, Urbatsch & Neubig

= Toiyabea =

Genus of plants

Toiyabea is a genus of North American plants in the tribe Astereae within the family Asteraceae. The genus is named for the Toiyabe Mountains in the US state of Nevada.

== Species ==
Species accepted by Plants of the World Online as of March 2024:

- Toiyabea alpina (L.C.Anderson & Goodrich) R.P.Roberts, Urbatsch & Neubig
- Toiyabea eximia (H.M.Hall) G.L.Nesom
- Toiyabea granitica (Tiehm & L.M.Shultz) G.L.Nesom
- Toiyabea peirsonii (D.D.Keck) G.L.Nesom
