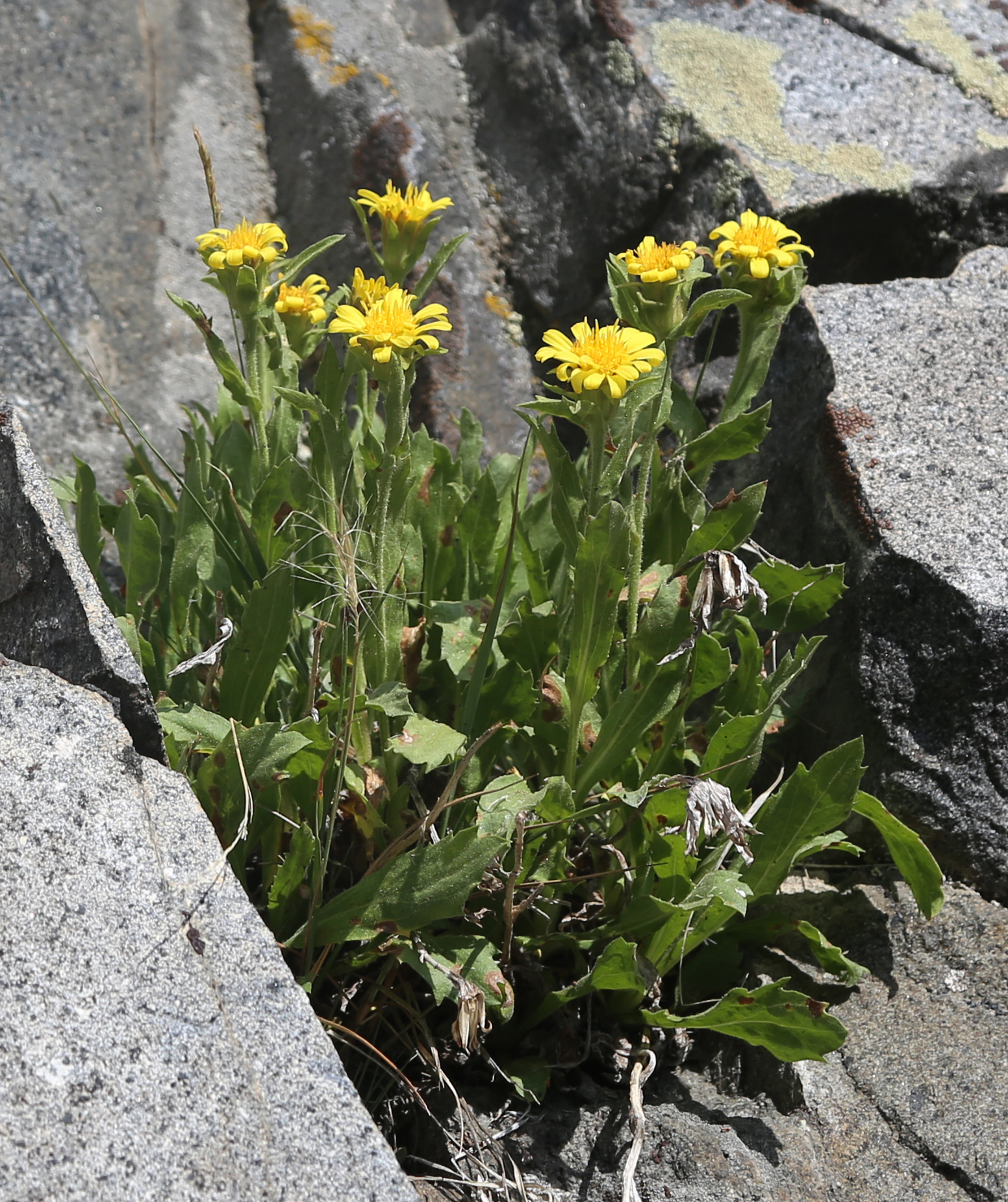

Scientific classification
- Kingdom: Plantae
- Clade: Tracheophytes
- Clade: Angiosperms
- Clade: Eudicots
- Clade: Asterids
- Order: Asterales
- Family: Asteraceae
- Genus: Toiyabea
- Species: T. peirsonii

Binomial name
- Toiyabea peirsonii (D.D.Keck) G.L.Nesom

Synonyms
- Haplopappus eximius subsp. peirsonii D.D.Keck; Haplopappus peirsonii (D.D.Keck) J.T.Howell; Lorandersonia peirsonii (D.D.Keck) Urbatsch, R.P.Roberts & Neubig; Tonestus peirsonii (D.D.Keck) G.L.Nesom & D.R.Morgan

= Toiyabea peirsonii =

Species of plant

Tonestus peirsonii is a local-endemic species of flowering plant in the family Asteraceae known by the common names Inyo tonestus, Peirson's serpentweed and Peirson's tonestus.

== Distribution ==
The plant is endemic to California, where it is known only from the Eastern High Sierra Nevada, and the White Mountains across Owens Valley to the east, both within Inyo National Forest. It grows in mountain habitat in subalpine and alpine climates at 2900–3700 m, preferring rock talus or niches in granite cliffs. These images are from the original type location high in Rock Creek basin, Inyo County CA.

== Description ==
Toiyabea peirsonii is a perennial herb producing a branching stem from a caudex and taproot unit, reaching up to about 20 centimeters tall and taking a clumpy form. The leaves are up to 8 centimeters long, variable in shape but usually broader toward the end, and with toothed edges. Dried remnants of leaves or flowers from previous years may be visible.

The inflorescence is usually a single flower head, or a cluster of up to four heads, each up to 2 centimeters wide with green, rough-haired phyllaries in a broad (14-28mm) somewhat leaf-like involucre below the flower. The head bears 16-20 curling, bright yellow ray florets around a center containing many tubular disc florets. Blooming occurs in July and August.

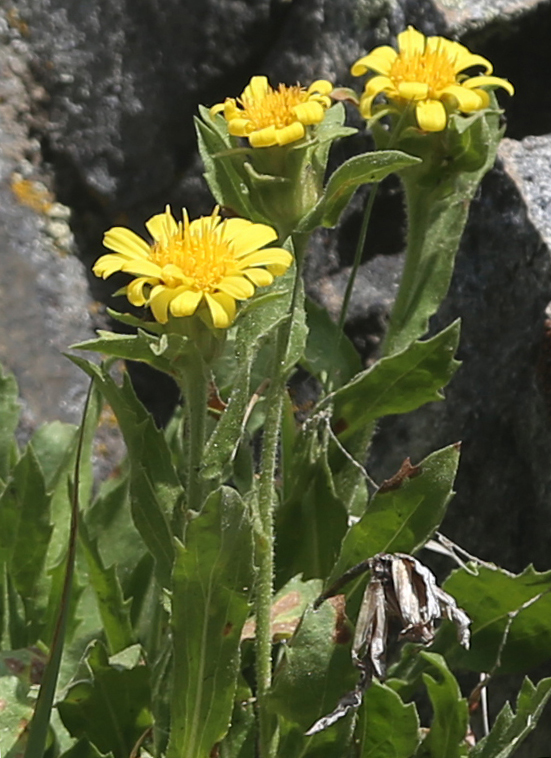
Toiyabea peirsonii flower closeup
