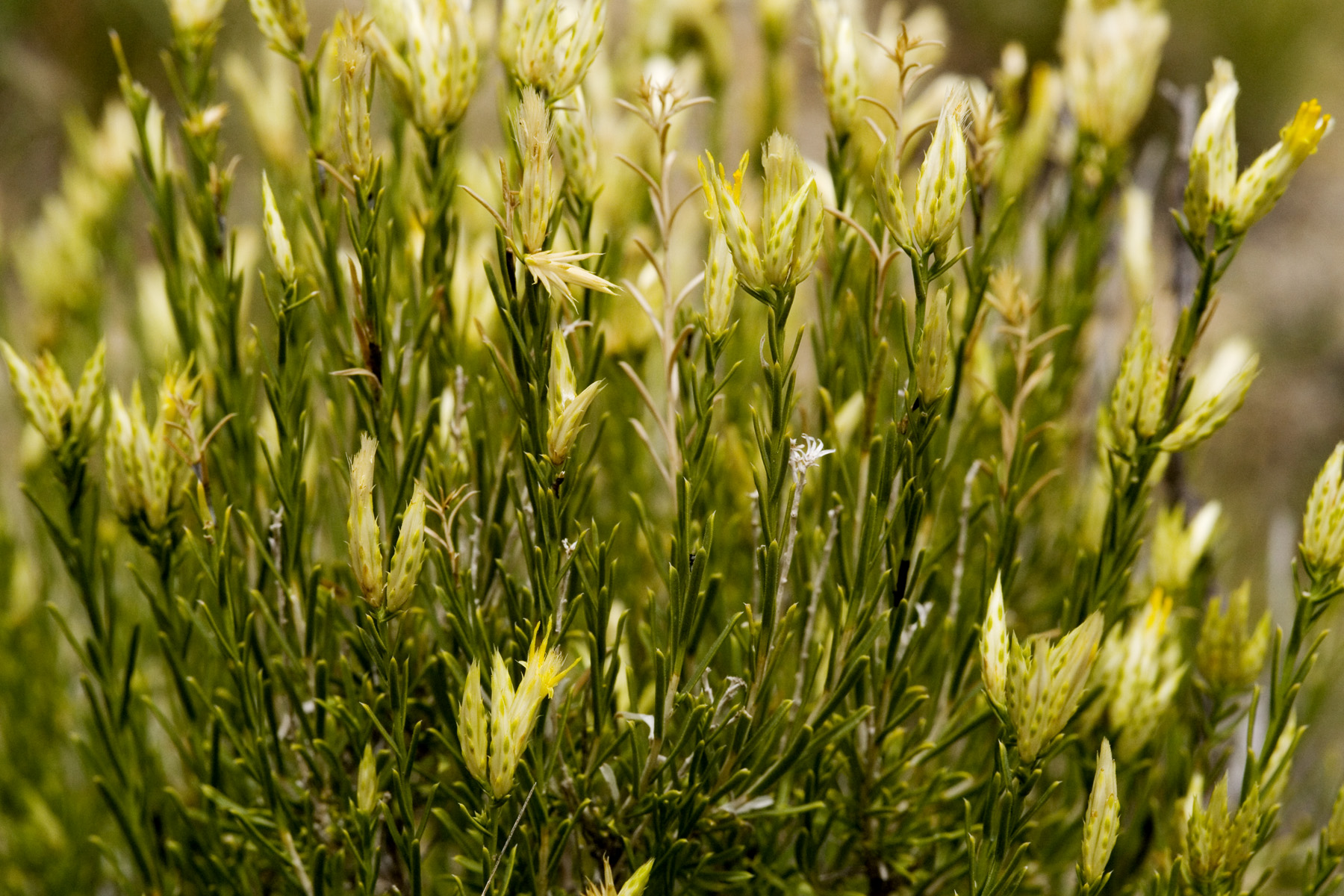
- Lorandersonia baileyi

Scientific classification
- Kingdom: Plantae
- Clade: Tracheophytes
- Clade: Angiosperms
- Clade: Eudicots
- Clade: Asterids
- Order: Asterales
- Family: Asteraceae
- Subfamily: Asteroideae
- Tribe: Astereae
- Subtribe: Solidagininae
- Genus: Lorandersonia; Urbatsch, R.P. Roberts & Neubig

Type species
- Linosyris pulchella A.Gray

= Lorandersonia =

Rabbitbush

Genus of flowering plants

Lorandersonia, commonly called rabbitbush, is a genus of North American flowering plants in the family Asteraceae.

The genus is named for American botanist Loran Crittenden Anderson of Florida State University.

Species

- Lorandersonia baileyi (Wooton & Standl.) Urbatsch, R.P.Roberts & Neubig – northern Mexico (Chihuahua, Coahuila, Nuevo León) + Southwestern United States (Arizona New Mexico Texas Oklahoma Kansas Colorado Utah)
- Lorandersonia linifolia (Greene) Urbatsch, R.P.Roberts & Neubig – Arizona New Mexico Colorado Utah Wyoming Montana
- Lorandersonia microcephala (Cronquist) Urbatsch, R.P.Roberts & Neubig – New Mexico (Taos + Rio Arriba Cos), southern Colorado
- Lorandersonia peirsonii (D.D.Keck) Urbatsch, R.P.Roberts & Neubig – Sierra Nevada in California (Inyo, Mono, Fresno Cos)
- Lorandersonia pulchella (A.Gray) Urbatsch, R.P.Roberts & Neubig – Chihuahua, Coahuila, Texas New Mexico
- Lorandersonia salicina (S.F.Blake) Urbatsch, R.P.Roberts & Neubig – Nevada (Clark Co), Arizona (Mohave + Yavapai Cos)
- Lorandersonia spathulata (L.C.Anderson) Urbatsch, R.P.Roberts & Neubig – Texas New Mexico
