= List of Erigeron species =

As of December 2020, Plants of the World Online (POWO) lists around 460 species of plants in the genus Erigeron (Asteraceae):

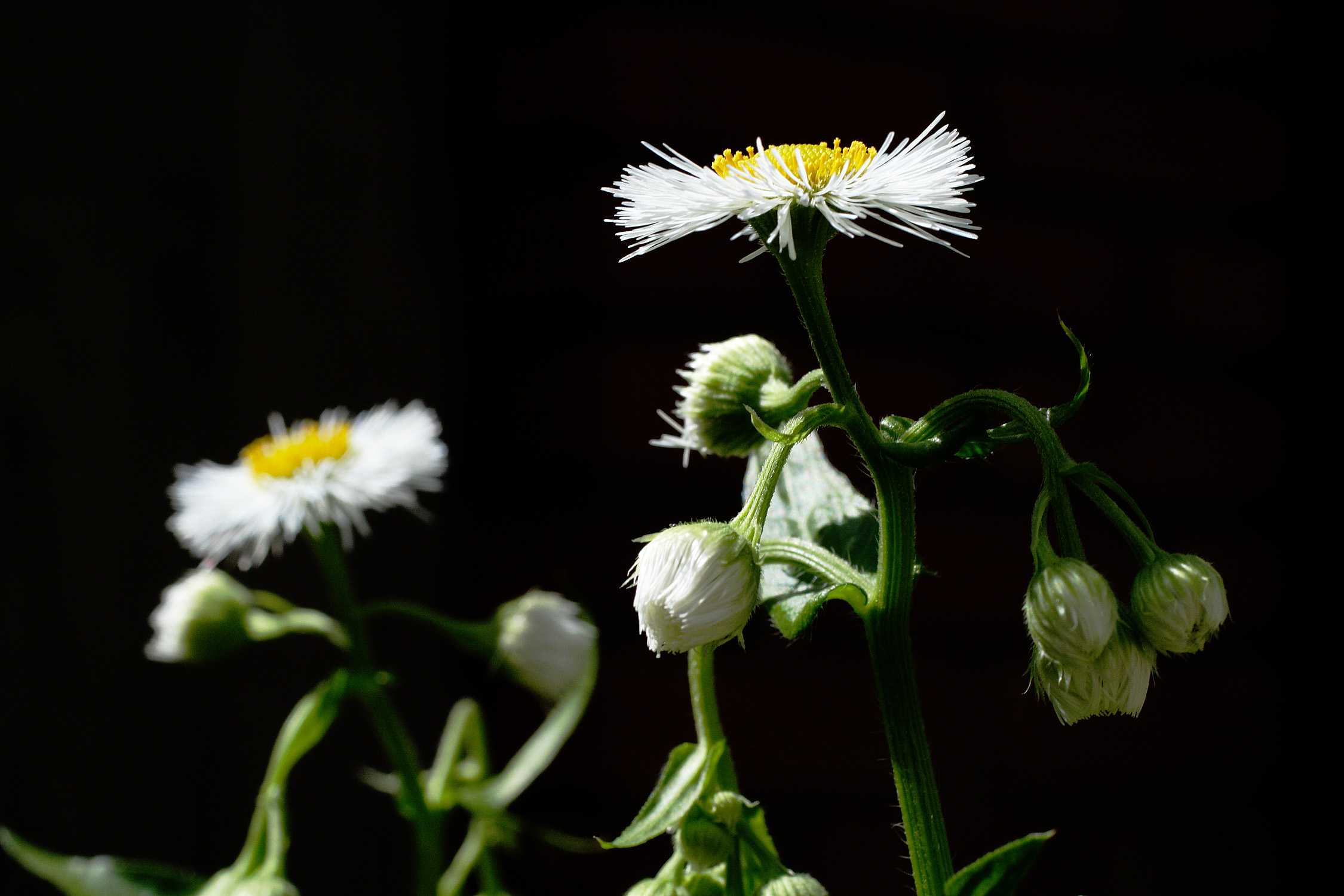
Erigeron annuus

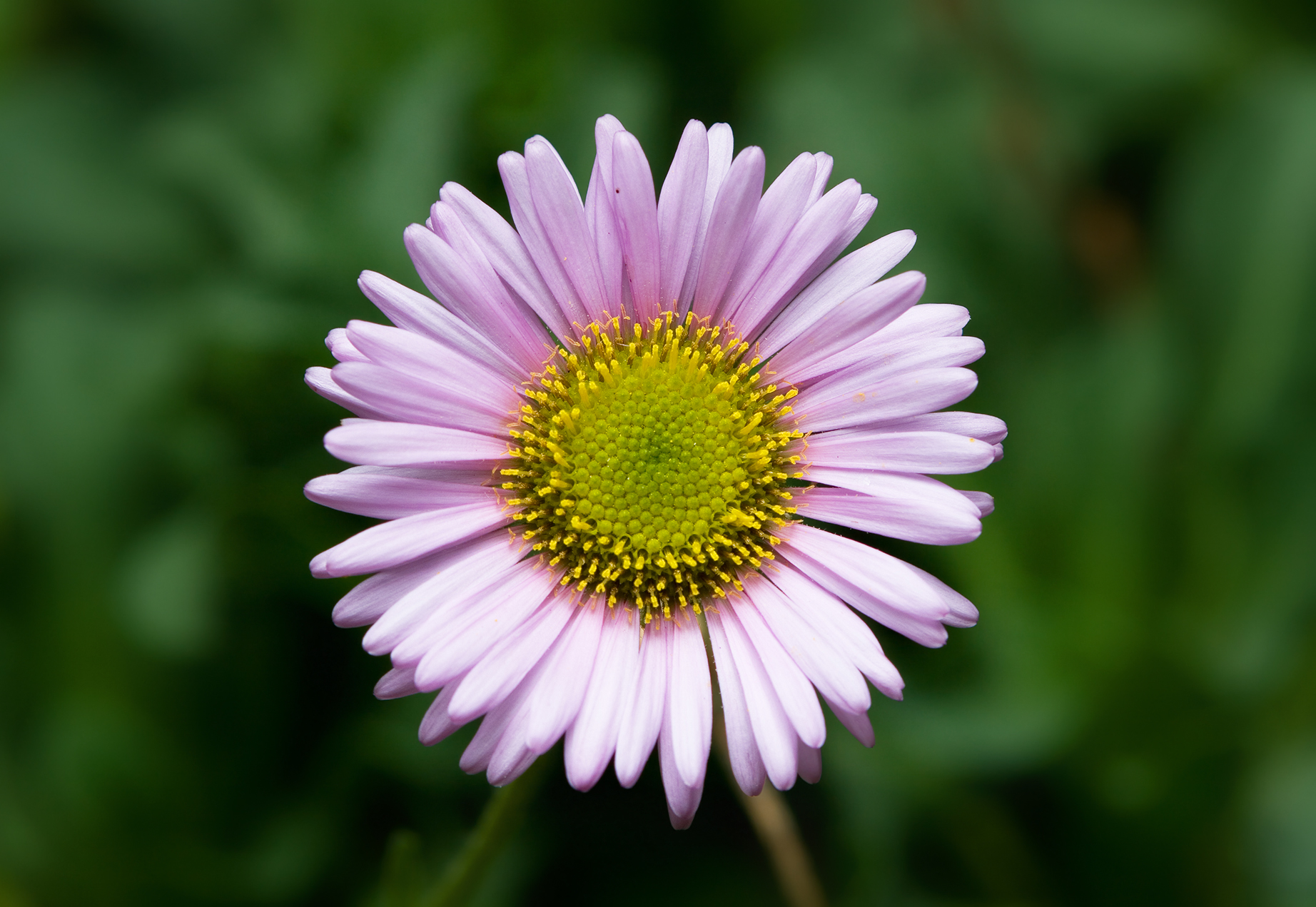
Erigeron glaucus

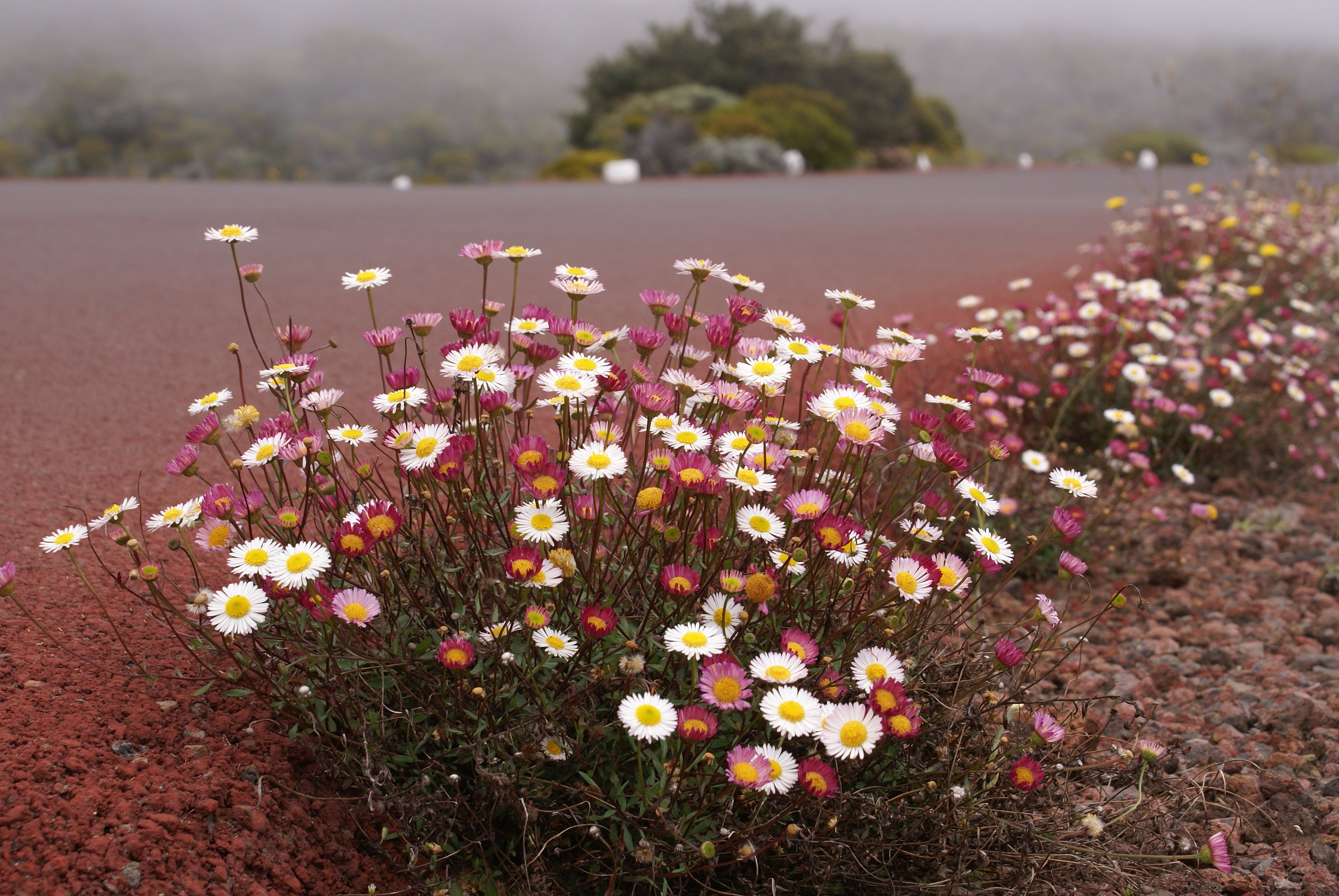
Erigeron karvinskianus

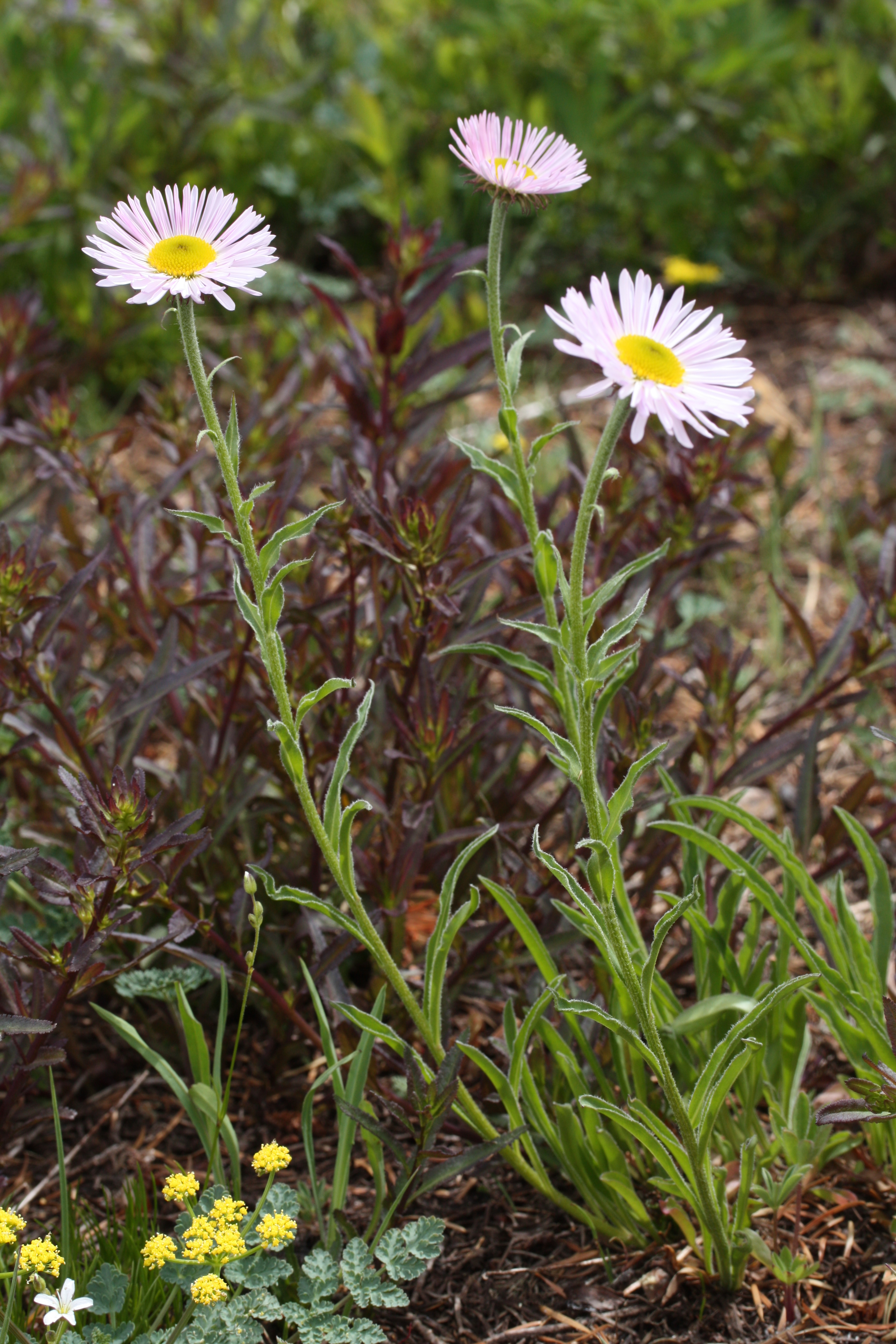
Erigeron peregrinus

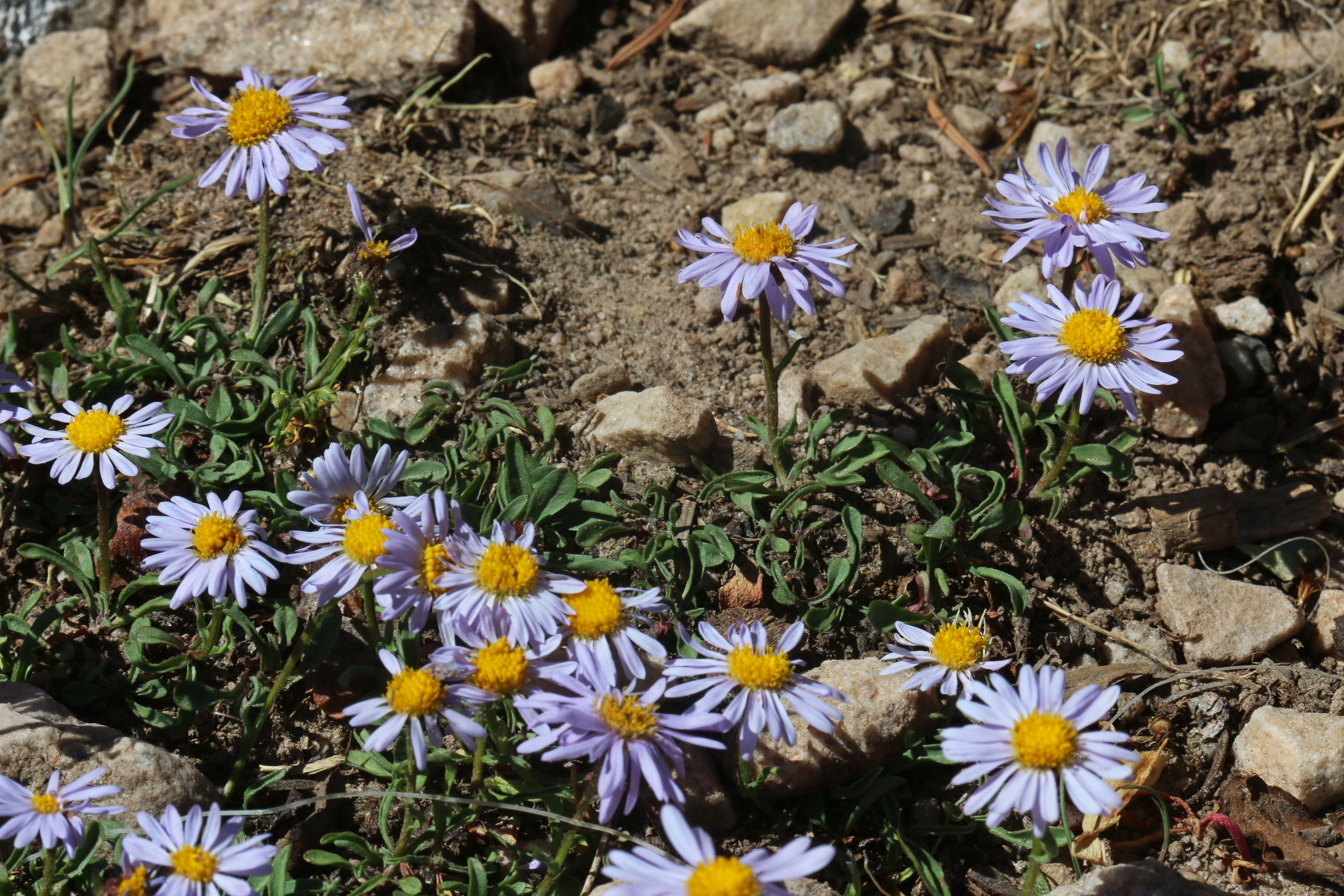
Erigeron ursinus

== A ==
- Erigeron abajoensis Cronquist
- Erigeron abyssinicus (Sch.Bip. ex A.Rich.) Sch.Bip. ex Schweinf. & Asch.
- Erigeron acomanus Spellenb. & P.J.Knight
- Erigeron acris L.
- Erigeron adscendens Turcz.
- Erigeron aequifolius H.M.Hall
- Erigeron algidus Jeps.
- Erigeron aliceae Howell
- Erigeron allisonii D.B.Poind., B.R.Keener & Noyes
- Erigeron allochrous Botsch.
- Erigeron allocotus S.F.Blake
- Erigeron alpicola (Makino) Makino
- Erigeron alpiniformis Cronquist
- Erigeron alpinus L.
- Erigeron altaicus Popov
- Erigeron alternifolius (Lawesson & Adsersen) N.Andrus & Tye
- Erigeron altissimus R.R.Stewart
- Erigeron anchana G.L.Nesom
- Erigeron andicola DC.
- Erigeron angustissimus Lindl. ex DC.
- Erigeron anisophyllus Rech.f.
- Erigeron annuactis G.L.Nesom
- Erigeron annuus (L.) Pers.
- Erigeron aphanactis Greene
- Erigeron apiculatus Benth.
- Erigeron aquarius Standl. & Steyerm.
- Erigeron arachnoideus Bornm.
- Erigeron aragonensis Vierh.
- Erigeron arenarioides (Eaton ex A.Gray) Rydb.
- Erigeron argentatus A.Gray
- Erigeron arisolius G.L.Nesom
- Erigeron arizonicus A.Gray
- Erigeron asperugineus A.Gray
- Erigeron astranthioides De Jong & G.L.Nesom
- Erigeron atticus Vill.
- Erigeron aurantiacus Regel
- Erigeron aureus Greene
- Erigeron azureus Regel ex Popov

== B ==
- Erigeron badachschanicus Botsch.
- Erigeron baicalensis Botsch.
- Erigeron barbarensis G.L.Nesom & T.Van Devender
- Erigeron barbellulatus Greene
- Erigeron basalticus Hoover
- Erigeron basaseachensis G.L.Nesom
- Erigeron basilobatus S.F.Blake
- Erigeron baumii O.Hoffm.
- Erigeron bellidiastroides Griseb.
- Erigeron bellidiastrum Nutt.
- Erigeron bellidiformis Popov
- Erigeron bellioides DC.
- Erigeron bigelovii A.Gray
- Erigeron biolettii Greene
- Erigeron blakei Cabrera
- Erigeron blochmaniae Greene
- Erigeron bloomeri A.Gray
- Erigeron bonariensis L.
- Erigeron borealis Simmons
- Erigeron breviscapus (Vaniot) Hand.-Mazz.
- Erigeron breweri A.Gray
- Erigeron burejensis Barkalov

== C ==
- Erigeron cabelloi A.Pujadas, García-Salmones & E.López
- Erigeron caeruleus Urb.
- Erigeron caespitans Kom.
- Erigeron caespitosus Nutt.
- Erigeron calcicola Greenm.
- Erigeron calderae A.Hansen
- Erigeron calvus Coville
- Erigeron campanensis Valdeb., Lowrey & Stuessy
- Erigeron canaani S.L.Welsh
- Erigeron canadensis L.
- Erigeron canus A.Gray
- Erigeron capillipes Ekman ex Urb.
- Erigeron caramanicus Bornm.
- Erigeron cardaminifolius Wedd.
- Erigeron cascadensis A.Heller
- Erigeron caucasicus Steven
- Erigeron caulinifolius G.L.Nesom
- Erigeron cavernensis S.L.Welsh & N.D.Atwood
- Erigeron cedretorum Rech.f.
- Erigeron celerieri Emb. & Maire
- Erigeron cervinus Greene
- Erigeron chiangii G.L.Nesom
- Erigeron chihuahuanus Greene
- Erigeron chionophilus Wedd.
- Erigeron chrysopsidis A.Gray
- Erigeron cieloensis G.L.Nesom
- Erigeron cilicicus Vierh.
- Erigeron cinereus Hook. & Arn.
- Erigeron circulis G.L.Nesom
- Erigeron clokeyi Cronquist
- Erigeron columnaris G.L.Nesom
- Erigeron compactus S.F.Blake
- Erigeron compositus Pursh
- Erigeron concinnus Torr. & A.Gray
- Erigeron conditii D.J.Keil
- Erigeron consimilis Cronquist
- Erigeron conyzoides F.Muell.
- Erigeron cordatus (Kuntze) Cabrera
- Erigeron coronarius Greene
- Erigeron coroniglandifer G.L.Nesom
- Erigeron corrales-molinensis Danton
- Erigeron corymbosus Nutt.
- Erigeron coulteri Porter & J.M.Coult.
- Erigeron crenatus Eastw. ex I.M.Johnst.
- Erigeron cronquistii Maguire
- Erigeron cuatrocienegensis G.L.Nesom
- Erigeron cuneifolius DC.
- Erigeron cyanactis Rech.f.

== D ==
- Erigeron dactyloides (Greenm.) G.L.Nesom
- Erigeron daenensis Vierh.
- Erigeron darrellianus Hemsl.
- Erigeron daveauanus (Sennen) Greuter
- Erigeron davisii (Cronquist) G.L.Nesom
- Erigeron decumbens Nutt.
- Erigeron delphinifolius Willd.
- Erigeron denalii A.Nelson
- Erigeron disparipilus Cronquist
- Erigeron dissectus Urb.
- Erigeron divaricatus Michx.
- Erigeron divergens Torr. & A.Gray
- Erigeron dolomiticola (J.R.Allison) D.B.Poind., B.R.Keener & Noyes
- Erigeron domingensis Urb.
- Erigeron dryophyllus A.Gray

== E ==
- Erigeron eatonii A.Gray
- Erigeron ecuadoriensis Hieron.
- Erigeron elatior Greene
- Erigeron elatus Greene
- Erigeron elborsensis Boiss.
- Erigeron elegantulus Greene
- Erigeron elmeri Greene
- Erigeron emodi I.M.Turner
- Erigeron engelmannii A.Nelson
- Erigeron epiroticus (Vierh.) Halácsy
- Erigeron eriocalyx (Ledeb.) Vierh.
- Erigeron eriocephalus J.Vahl
- Erigeron eruptens G.L.Nesom
- Erigeron evermannii Rydb.
- Erigeron exilis A.Gray
- Erigeron eximius Greene

== F ==
- Erigeron fasciculatus Colla
- Erigeron fernandezianus (Colla) Solbrig
- Erigeron filifolius (Hook.) Nutt.
- Erigeron flabellifolius Rydb.
- Erigeron flagellaris A.Gray
- Erigeron flagellifolius Cabrera
- Erigeron flahaultianus Thell.
- Erigeron flettii G.N.Jones
- Erigeron floribundus (Kunth) Sch.Bip.
- Erigeron foliosus Nutt.
- Erigeron formosissimus Greene
- Erigeron forreri (Greene) Greene
- Erigeron fraternus Greene
- Erigeron frigidus Boiss. ex DC.
- Erigeron fuertesii Urb.
- Erigeron fukuyamae Kitam.
- Erigeron fundus G.L.Nesom

== G ==
- Erigeron galeottii (A.Gray ex Hemsl.) Greene
- Erigeron garrettii A.Nelson
- Erigeron geiseri Shinners
- Erigeron gilliesii (Hook. & Arn.) Cabrera
- Erigeron glabellus Nutt.
- Erigeron glabratus Hoppe & Hornsch. ex Bluff & Fingerh.
- Erigeron glacialis (Nutt.) A.Nelson
- Erigeron glaucus Ker Gawl.
- Erigeron goodrichii S.L.Welsh
- Erigeron gouanii L.
- Erigeron gracilis Rydb.
- Erigeron grandiflorus Hook.
- Erigeron griseus (Greenm.) G.L.Nesom
- Erigeron guatemalensis (S.F.Blake) G.L.Nesom

== H ==
- Erigeron heleniae G.L.Nesom
- Erigeron heliographis G.L.Nesom
- Erigeron hessii G.L.Nesom
- Erigeron heteromorphus B.L.Rob.
- Erigeron hillii Domke
- Erigeron himalajensis Vierh.
- Erigeron hintoniorum G.L.Nesom
- Erigeron hircianus
- Erigeron hirtellus DC.
- Erigeron hispanicus Maire
- Erigeron hissaricus Botsch.
- Erigeron hodgsoniae G.L.Nesom
- Erigeron howellii A.Gray
- Erigeron × huelsenii Vatke
- Erigeron humilis Graham
- Erigeron hungaricus (Vierh.) Pawl.
- Erigeron hyoseroides Griseb.
- Erigeron hyperboreus Greene
- Erigeron hyrcanicus Bornm. & Vierh.
- Erigeron hyssopifolius Michx.

== I ==
- Erigeron illapelinus Phil.
- Erigeron imbricatus Vierh.
- Erigeron incaicus Solbrig
- Erigeron incanus Vahl
- Erigeron incertus Skottsb.
- Erigeron ingae Skottsb.
- Erigeron inoptatus A.Gray
- Erigeron inornatus A.Gray
- Erigeron irazuense Greenm.

== J ==
- Erigeron jaeschkei Vierh.
- Erigeron jamaicensis L.
- Erigeron janivultus G.L.Nesom
- Erigeron jenkinsii G.L.Nesom
- Erigeron jonesii Cronquist

== K ==
- Erigeron kachinensis S.L.Welsh & Gl.Moore
- Erigeron karvinskianus DC.
- Erigeron katiae S.L.Welsh & N.D.Atwood
- Erigeron kiukiangensis Y.Ling & Y.L.Chen
- Erigeron klamathensis (G.L.Nesom) G.L.Nesom
- Erigeron krylovii Serg.
- Erigeron kumaunensis (Vierh.) Wendelbo
- Erigeron kunshanensis Y.Ling & Y.L.Chen
- Erigeron kuschei Eastw.

== L ==
- Erigeron lachnocephalus Botsch.
- Erigeron lackschewitzii G.L.Nesom & W.A.Weber
- Erigeron laevigatus Rich.
- Erigeron lalehzaricus (Rech.f.) ída f.
- Erigeron lanatus Hook.
- Erigeron lanceolatus Wedd.
- Erigeron lancifolius Hook.f.
- Erigeron lanuginosus Y.L.Chen
- Erigeron larrainianus (J.Rémy) Cabrera
- Erigeron lassenianus Greene
- Erigeron latifolius Hao Zhang & Zhi F.Zhang
- Erigeron latus (A.Nelson & J.F.Macbr.) Cronquist
- Erigeron laxiflorus Baker
- Erigeron lechleri Sch.Bip.
- Erigeron leibergii Piper
- Erigeron leiolepis Solbrig
- Erigeron leiomerus A.Gray
- Erigeron leioreades Popov
- Erigeron lemmonii A.Gray
- Erigeron lepidopodus (B.L.Rob. & Fernald) G.L.Nesom
- Erigeron leptocladus Rech.f.
- Erigeron leptopetalus Phil.
- Erigeron leptorhizon DC.
- Erigeron leucoglossus Y.Ling & Y.L.Chen
- Erigeron libanensis Urb.
- Erigeron libanoticus Vierh.
- Erigeron linearis (Hook.) Piper
- Erigeron lobatus A.Nelson
- Erigeron lonchophyllus Hook.
- Erigeron longipes DC.
- Erigeron lorentzii (Griseb.) Cabrera
- Erigeron luteoviridis Skottsb.
- Erigeron luxurians (Skottsb.) Solbrig

== M ==
- Erigeron macdonaldii G.L.Nesom
- Erigeron maguirei Cronquist
- Erigeron major (Boiss.) Vierh.
- Erigeron mancus Rydb.
- Erigeron maniopotamicus G.L.Nesom & T.W.Nelson
- Erigeron mariposanus Congdon
- Erigeron mashadansis Parsa & Maleki
- Erigeron matthiolifolius Parsa
- Erigeron maxonii S.F.Blake
- Erigeron mayoensis G.L.Nesom
- Erigeron melanocephalus A.Nelson
- Erigeron mendocinensis D.J.Keil
- Erigeron metrius S.F.Blake
- Erigeron mihianus S.F.Blake
- Erigeron mimus (S.F.Blake) G.L.Nesom
- Erigeron miser A.Gray
- Erigeron miyabeanus (Tatew. & Kitam.) Tatew. & Kitam. ex H.Hara
- Erigeron modestus A.Gray
- Erigeron mohinorensis G.L.Nesom
- Erigeron monorchis Griseb.
- Erigeron monticolus Wall. ex DC.
- Erigeron morelensis Greenm.
- Erigeron morrisonensis Hayata
- Erigeron muirii A.Gray
- Erigeron multiceps Greene
- Erigeron multifolius Hand.-Mazz.
- Erigeron multiradiatus (Lindl. ex DC.) Benth. & Hook.f.
- Erigeron muralis Lapeyr.
- Erigeron myosotis Pers.

== N ==
- Erigeron nacoriensis G.L.Nesom
- Erigeron nannogeron Rech.f.
- Erigeron nanus Nutt.
- Erigeron narcissus G.L.Nesom
- Erigeron nauseosus A.Nelson
- Erigeron neglectus A.Kern.
- Erigeron nematophylloides S.L.Welsh & A.Huber
- Erigeron nematophyllus Rydb.
- Erigeron neomexicanus A.Gray
- Erigeron nitens G.L.Nesom
- Erigeron nivalis Nutt.

== O ==
- Erigeron oaxacanus Greenm.
- Erigeron ochroleucus Nutt.
- Erigeron ocoensis Urb. & Ekman
- Erigeron olympicus Schott & Kotschy
- Erigeron onofrensis G.L.Nesom
- Erigeron oreades (Schrenk) Fisch. & C.A.Mey.
- Erigeron oreganus A.Gray
- Erigeron oreophilus Greenm.
- Erigeron othonnifolius Hook. & Arn.
- Erigeron ovinus Cronquist
- Erigeron oxyphyllus Greene

== P ==
- Erigeron pacalis Björk
- Erigeron pacayensis Greenm.
- Erigeron pallens Cronquist
- Erigeron pallidus Popov
- Erigeron palmeri A.Gray
- Erigeron pamiricus Botsch. & Kochk.
- Erigeron pampeanus Parodi
- Erigeron paolii Gamisans
- Erigeron parishii A.Gray
- Erigeron parryi Canby & Rose
- Erigeron patagonicus Phil.
- Erigeron patentisquama Jeffrey
- Erigeron pattersonii G.L.Nesom
- Erigeron paucilobus Urb.
- Erigeron pauper Benoist
- Erigeron pazensis Sch.Bip.
- Erigeron peregrinus Greene
- Erigeron petiolaris Vierh.
- Erigeron petroiketes Rech.f.
- Erigeron petrophilus Greene
- Erigeron philadelphicus L.
- Erigeron pinkavii B.L.Turner
- Erigeron pinnatisectus (A.Gray) A.Nelson
- Erigeron piperianus Cronquist
- Erigeron piscaticus G.L.Nesom
- Erigeron plesiogeron Rech.f.
- Erigeron podophyllus G.L.Nesom
- Erigeron poliospermus A.Gray
- Erigeron polycephalus (Larsen) G.L.Nesom
- Erigeron polycladus Urb.
- Erigeron popayanensis Hieron.
- Erigeron popovii Botsch.
- Erigeron porphyrolepis Y.Ling & Y.L.Chen
- Erigeron porsildii G.L.Nesom & D.F.Murray
- Erigeron potosinus Standl.
- Erigeron primulifolius (Lam.) Greuter
- Erigeron pringlei A.Gray
- Erigeron procumbens (Mill.) G.L.Nesom
- Erigeron × pseudocrispus Pierrot
- Erigeron pseuderiocephalus Popov
- Erigeron pseudohyrcanicus Grierson ex R.R.Stewart
- Erigeron pseudoseravschanicus Botsch.
- Erigeron pseudotenuicaulis Brouillet & Y.L.Chen
- Erigeron psilocaulis Urb.
- Erigeron pubescens Kunth
- Erigeron pulchellus Michx.
- Erigeron pulcher Phil.
- Erigeron pulcherrimus A.Heller
- Erigeron pumilus Nutt.
- Erigeron punjabensis T.Akhtar & Chaudhri
- Erigeron purpurascens Y.Ling & Y.L.Chen
- Erigeron purpuratus Greene
- Erigeron pygmaeus Greene
- Erigeron pyrami Botsch.

== Q ==
- Erigeron quattuordomuum Molinari
- Erigeron quercifolius Lam.
- Erigeron quiexobrensis G.L.Nesom

== R ==
- Erigeron radicatus Hook.
- Erigeron raphaelis Cuatrec.
- Erigeron reductus (Cronquist) G.L.Nesom
- Erigeron reinanus G.L.Nesom
- Erigeron religiosus Cronquist
- Erigeron rhizomactis G.L.Nesom
- Erigeron rhizomatus Cronquist
- Erigeron robustior (Cronquist) G.L.Nesom
- Erigeron rosulatus Wedd.
- Erigeron roylei DC.
- Erigeron rupicola Phil.
- Erigeron rybius G.L.Nesom
- Erigeron rydbergii Cronquist

== S ==
- Erigeron sachalinensis Botsch.
- Erigeron salishii G.W.Douglas & Packer
- Erigeron salmonensis Brunsfeld & G.L.Nesom
- Erigeron sanctarum S.Watson
- Erigeron saxatilis G.L.Nesom
- Erigeron sceptrifer G.L.Nesom
- Erigeron schalbusii Vierh.
- Erigeron schikotanensis Barkalov
- Erigeron schimperi (Sch.Bip. ex A.Rich.) Sch.Bip. ex Schweinf.
- Erigeron schleicheri Gremli
- Erigeron schmalhausenii Popov
- Erigeron schnackii Solbrig
- Erigeron scoparioides G.L.Nesom
- Erigeron scopulinus G.L.Nesom & V.D.Roth
- Erigeron seemannii (Sch.Bip.) Greene
- Erigeron semibarbatus DC.
- Erigeron seravschanicus Popov
- Erigeron serpentinus G.L.Nesom
- Erigeron silenifolius (Turcz.) Botsch.
- Erigeron sionis Cronquist
- Erigeron sivinskii G.L.Nesom
- Erigeron socorrensis Brandegee
- Erigeron sogdianus Popov
- Erigeron sparsifolius Eastw.
- Erigeron speciosus (Lindl.) DC.
- Erigeron spiciformis Griseb.
- Erigeron spiculosus Hook. & Arn.
- Erigeron stanfordii I.M.Johnst. ex G.L.Nesom
- Erigeron × stanleyi (A.R.G.Mundell) A.R.G.Mundell
- Erigeron stanselliae K.L.Chambers
- Erigeron stenophyllus Hook. & Arn.
- Erigeron steudelii (Sch.Bip. ex A.Rich.) Sch.Bip. ex Schweinf.
- Erigeron strigosus Muhl. ex Willd.
- Erigeron strigulosus Greene
- Erigeron subacaulis (McVaugh) G.L.Nesom
- Erigeron subalpinus Urb.
- Erigeron subglaber Cronquist
- Erigeron sublyratus Roxb. ex DC.
- Erigeron subtrinervis Rydb. ex Porter & Britton
- Erigeron sumatrensis Retz.
- Erigeron supplex A.Gray
- Erigeron swatensis Grierson ex R.R.Stewart

== T ==
- Erigeron taipeiensis Y.Ling & Y.L.Chen
- Erigeron talyschensis Tzvelev
- Erigeron taylorii Britton & P.Wilson
- Erigeron tenellus DC.
- Erigeron tener A.Gray
- Erigeron tenuis Torr. & A.Gray
- Erigeron tephropodus G.L.Nesom
- Erigeron thermarum (Phil.) Cabrera
- Erigeron thrincioides Griseb.
- Erigeron thunbergii A.Gray
- Erigeron tianschanicus Botsch.
- Erigeron tracyi Greene
- Erigeron trifidus Hook.
- Erigeron trihecatactis S.F.Blake
- Erigeron trimorphopsis Botsch.
- Erigeron trisulcus D.Don
- Erigeron tuerckheimii Urb.
- Erigeron tunariensis Kuntze
- Erigeron turnerorum G.L.Nesom
- Erigeron tweedyi Canby

== U ==
- Erigeron uintahensis Cronquist
- Erigeron uliginosus Benth.
- Erigeron uncialis S.F.Blake
- Erigeron unguiphyllus G.L.Nesom
- Erigeron uniflorus L.
- Erigeron untermannii S.L.Welsh & Goodrich
- Erigeron ursinus D.C.Eaton
- Erigeron utahensis A.Gray

== V ==
- Erigeron vagus Payson
- Erigeron variegatus (Sch.Bip. ex A.Rich.) Sch.Bip. ex Schweinf. & Asch.
- Erigeron variifolius S.F.Blake
- Erigeron vegaensis Urb.
- Erigeron velutipes Hook. & Arn.
- Erigeron veracruzensis G.L.Nesom
- Erigeron verguinii Sennen
- Erigeron vernus (L.) Torr. & A.Gray
- Erigeron versicolor (Greenm.) G.L.Nesom
- Erigeron vetensis Rydb.
- Erigeron vicarius Botsch.
- Erigeron vichrenensis Pawl.
- Erigeron vicinus G.L.Nesom
- Erigeron violaceus Popov
- Erigeron vreelandii Rydb.

== W ==
- Erigeron watsonii (A.Gray) Cronquist
- Erigeron wellsii G.L.Nesom
- Erigeron wendelboi Rech.f.
- Erigeron wightii DC.
- Erigeron wilkenii O'Kane
- Erigeron wislizeni (A.Gray) Greene

== Y ==
- Erigeron yukonensis Rydb.

== Z ==
- Erigeron zacatensis G.L.Nesom
- Erigeron zederbaueri Vierh.
