= Erigeron porphyrolepis =

Scientific classification
- Kingdom: Plantae
- Clade: Tracheophytes
- Clade: Angiosperms
- Clade: Eudicots
- Clade: Asterids
- Order: Asterales
- Family: Asteraceae
- Genus: Erigeron
- Species: E. porphyrolepis

Binomial name
- Erigeron porphyrolepis Y.Ling & Y.L.Chen

Species of plant

Erigeron porphyrolepis is a Chinese species of flowering plants in the family Asteraceae. It grows on slopes and meadows in Sichuan and Tibet.

Erigeron porphyrolepis is a perennial, clumping-forming herb up to 27 cm (11 inches) tall, forming a thick woody rhizomes. Its flower heads have purple ray florets surrounding yellow disc florets.
