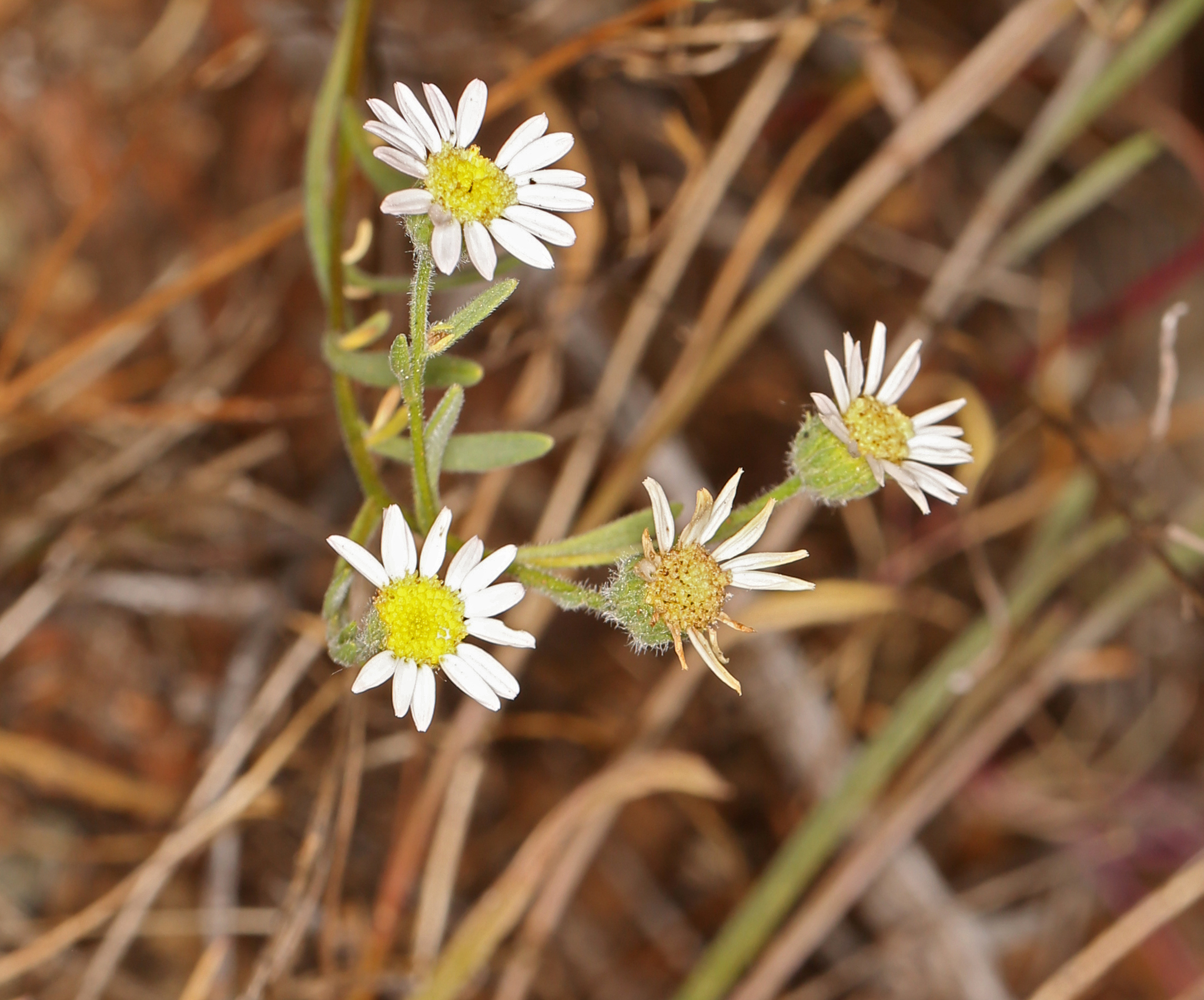
- In the Trinity Alps, California

Scientific classification
- Kingdom: Plantae
- Clade: Tracheophytes
- Clade: Angiosperms
- Clade: Eudicots
- Clade: Asterids
- Order: Asterales
- Family: Asteraceae
- Genus: Erigeron
- Species: E. lassenianus

Binomial name
- Erigeron lassenianus Greene

Synonyms
- Erigeron flexuosus Cronquist

= Erigeron lassenianus =

Species of flowering plant

Erigeron lassenianus is a species of flowering plant in the family Asteraceae known by the common name Mount Lassen fleabane.

Erigeron lassenianus is endemic to the high mountains of northern California, from close to the Oregon border south as far as northeastern Mendocino County and El Dorado County.

Erigeron lassenianus is a member of the coniferous forest understory. It grows erect or in low patches on the ground, reaching a maximum height of about 35 centimeters (14 inches). Its blue-green hairy foliage grows in a basal patch and along the stem, the leaves long and straight to spoon-shaped and between 5 and 15 centimeters (2-6 inches) in length. Atop the few-branched stem is an inflorescence of one to several flower heads each 5 to 12 centimeters (2-5 inches) wide. The center of each head is packed with golden yellow to pinkish-orange disc florets. Some heads also have ray florets which may be lavender or pinkish.
