= Erigeron leioreades =

Scientific classification
- Kingdom: Plantae
- Clade: Tracheophytes
- Clade: Angiosperms
- Clade: Eudicots
- Clade: Asterids
- Order: Asterales
- Family: Asteraceae
- Genus: Erigeron
- Species: E. leioreades

Binomial name
- Erigeron leioreades Popov

Species of flowering plant

Erigeron leioreades is an Asian species of flowering plants in the family Asteraceae. It grows in spruce forests and alpine meadows in Siberia, Xinjiang, and Kazakhstan.

Erigeron leioreades is a perennial, clump-forming herb up to 37 cm (15 inches) tall, forming underground rhizomes. Its flower heads have lilacray florets surrounding yellow disc florets.
