= Erigeron schmalhausenii =

Scientific classification
- Kingdom: Plantae
- Clade: Tracheophytes
- Clade: Angiosperms
- Clade: Eudicots
- Clade: Asterids
- Order: Asterales
- Family: Asteraceae
- Genus: Erigeron
- Species: E. schmalhausenii

Binomial name
- Erigeron schmalhausenii Popov

Synonyms
- Erigeron eriocephalus Regel & Schmalh. 1877 not Vahl. 1840

Species of flowering plant

Erigeron schmalhausenii is an Asian species of flowering plants in the family Asteraceae. It grows on mountains and glacial moraines in Xinjiang, Kazakhstan, Uzbekistan, and Siberia.

Erigeron schmalhausenii is a perennial, clumping-forming herb up to 45 cm (18 inches) tall, forming a thick woody rhizomes. Its flower heads have pink or lilac ray florets surrounding yellow disc florets.
