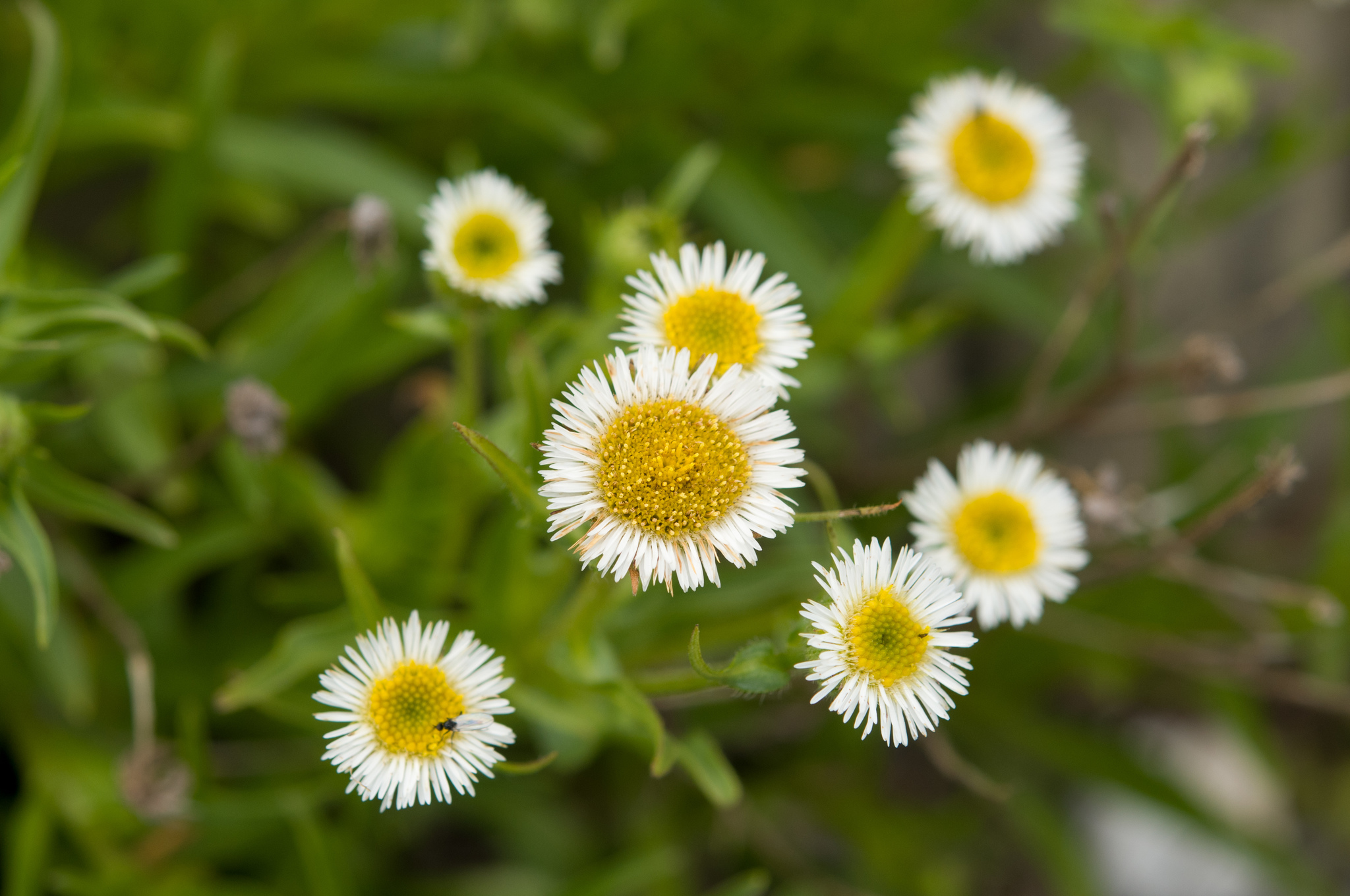

Scientific classification
- Kingdom: Plantae
- Clade: Tracheophytes
- Clade: Angiosperms
- Clade: Eudicots
- Clade: Asterids
- Order: Asterales
- Family: Asteraceae
- Genus: Erigeron
- Species: E. morrisonensis

Binomial name
- Erigeron morrisonensis Hayata

= Erigeron morrisonensis =

Species of flowering plant

Erigeron morrisonensis is an Asian species of flowering plants in the family Asteraceae. It grows in grasslands, rocky slopes, and coniferous forest in Taiwan.

Erigeron morrisonensis is a perennial, clump-forming herb up to 20 cm (8 inches) tall, forming a shortunderground rhizomes. Its flower heads have lilac or pale purple ray florets surrounding yellow disc florets.
