= Erigeron subglaber =

Scientific classification
- Kingdom: Plantae
- Clade: Tracheophytes
- Clade: Angiosperms
- Clade: Eudicots
- Clade: Asterids
- Order: Asterales
- Family: Asteraceae
- Genus: Erigeron
- Species: E. subglaber

Binomial name
- Erigeron subglaber Cronquist

Species of flowering plant

Erigeron subglaber is a rare North American species of flowering plants in the family Asteraceae known by the common name hairless fleabane. It has been found in the southern Rocky Mountains in the north-central part of the US state of New Mexico.

Erigeron subglaber grows in meadows in subalpine conifer forests, as well as on ridges and mountain peaks at high elevations. It is a very small perennial herb rarely more than 7 cm (2.8 inches) tall, producing a taproot and a woody caudex. The inflorescence generally contains only one flower heads per stem. Each head contains 25–35 purple or lavender ray florets surrounding many yellow disc florets.
