= Erigeron piscaticus =

Conservation status
- Critically Imperiled (NatureServe)

Scientific classification
- Kingdom: Plantae
- Clade: Tracheophytes
- Clade: Angiosperms
- Clade: Eudicots
- Clade: Asterids
- Order: Asterales
- Family: Asteraceae
- Genus: Erigeron
- Species: E. piscaticus

Binomial name
- Erigeron piscaticus G.L.Nesom

Species of flowering plant

Erigeron piscaticus is a rare species of flowering plant in the family Asteraceae known by the common name Fish Creek fleabane. It is endemic to Arizona in the United States, where it is known from three locations in Maricopa and Graham Counties.

Erigeron piscaticus is an annual herb producing hairy, glandular stems up to 40 centimeters (16 inches) tall from a taproot. The oval leaves are 1 or 2 centimeters (0.4-0.8 inches) long and mostly smooth-edged. The flower heads are produced 1-4 per stem, each lined with hairy, glandular phyllaries. The heads contain 45–58 white ray florets each about 3 millimeters (0.12 inches) long.

This plant grows on river terraces and washes. The "Fish Creek" part of the common name refers to Fish Creek Canyon in Maricopa County, where the type specimen was collected.
