= Erigeron vicarius =

Scientific classification
- Kingdom: Plantae
- Clade: Tracheophytes
- Clade: Angiosperms
- Clade: Eudicots
- Clade: Asterids
- Order: Asterales
- Family: Asteraceae
- Genus: Erigeron
- Species: E. vicarius

Binomial name
- Erigeron vicarius Botsch.

Species of flowering plant

Erigeron vicarius is an Asian species of flowering plants in the family Asteraceae. It grows in alpine meadows in Xinjiang, Uzbekistan, and Kazakhstan.

Erigeron vicarius is a perennial herb up to 28 cm (11 inches) tall, producing a short, branching rhizomes. Its flower heads have blue ray florets surrounding yellow disc florets.
