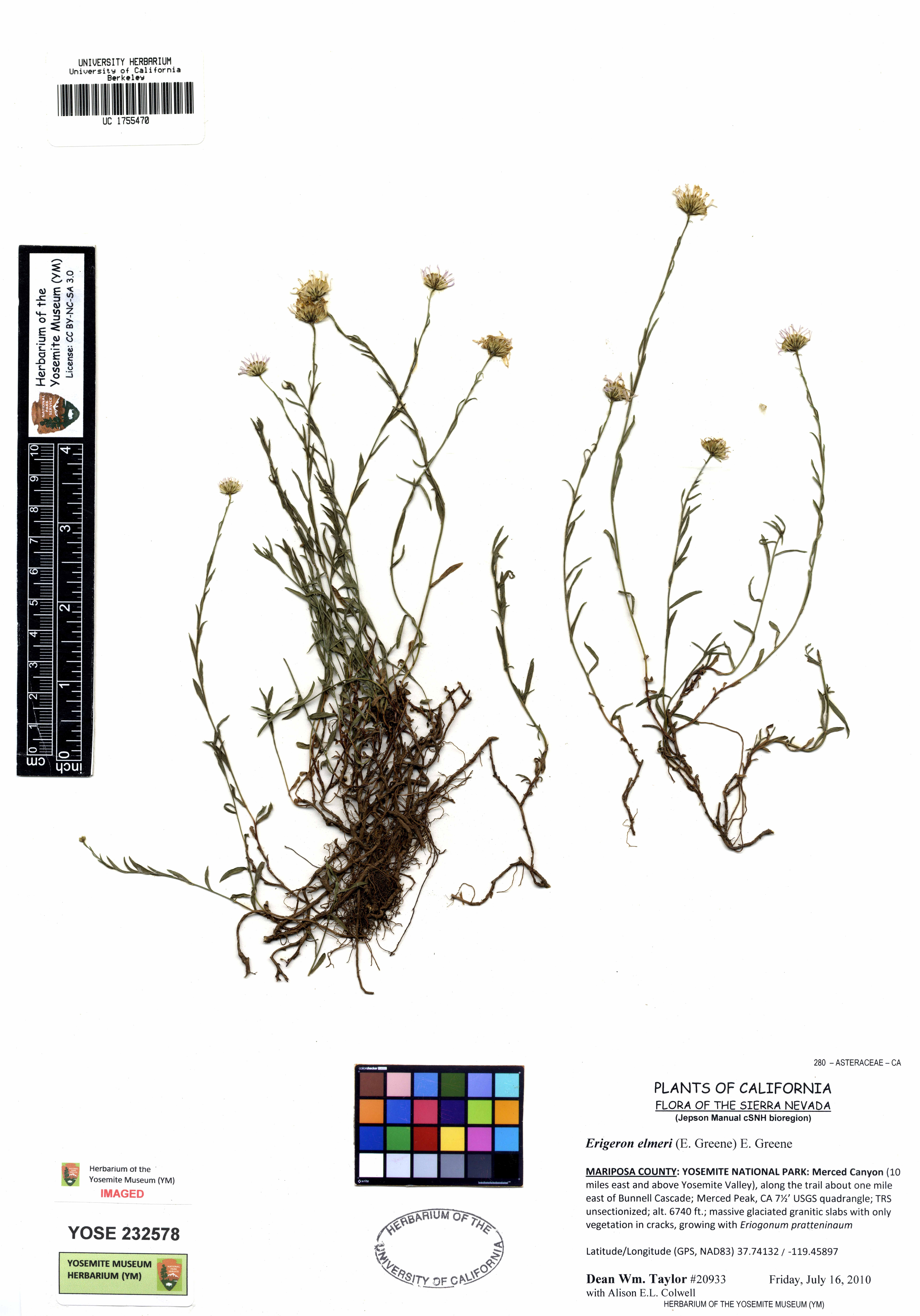

Scientific classification
- Kingdom: Plantae
- Clade: Tracheophytes
- Clade: Angiosperms
- Clade: Eudicots
- Clade: Asterids
- Order: Asterales
- Family: Asteraceae
- Genus: Erigeron
- Species: E. elmeri

Binomial name
- Erigeron elmeri (Greene) Greene

Synonyms
- Aster elmeri Greene

= Erigeron elmeri =

Species of flowering plant

Erigeron elmeri is a North American species of flowering plants in the family Asteraceae known by the common names Elmer's fleabane and Elmer's erigeron.

Erigeron elmeri has been found only in California in the western United States. It grows at high elevations in the Sierra Nevada from Mono and Tuolumne Counties south to Tulare County.

Erigeron elmeri is a perennial herb up to 20 centimeters (8 inches) in height. It produces 1-3 flower heads per stem, each head as many as 21 white ray florets surrounding numerous yellow disc florets.
