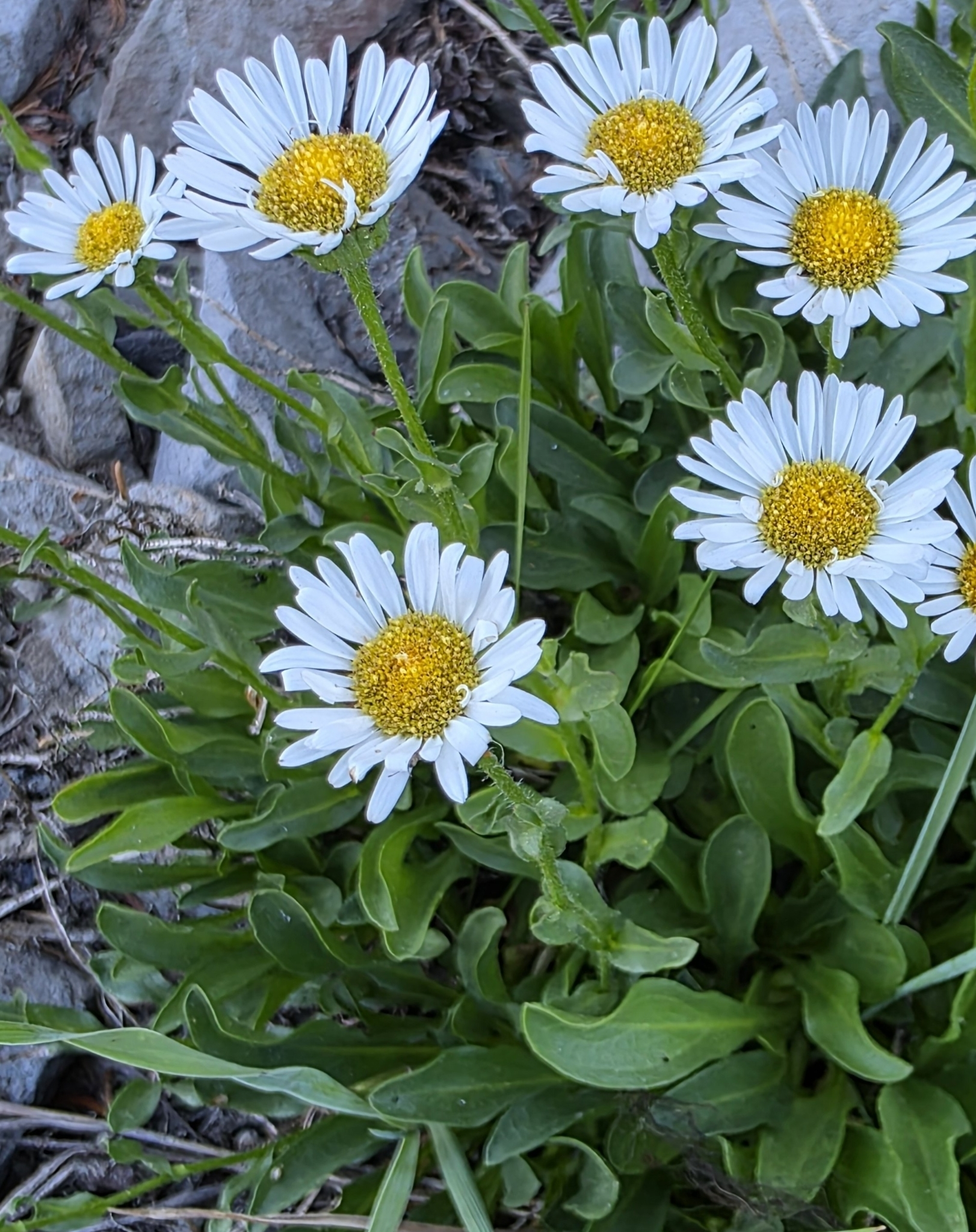

Scientific classification
- Kingdom: Plantae
- Clade: Tracheophytes
- Clade: Angiosperms
- Clade: Eudicots
- Clade: Asterids
- Order: Asterales
- Family: Asteraceae
- Genus: Erigeron
- Species: E. cascadensis

Binomial name
- Erigeron cascadensis A.Heller

Synonyms
- Erigeron pachyrhizus Greene; Erigeron spathulifolius Howell 1900, illegitimate homonym not Rydb. 1899

= Erigeron cascadensis =

Species of flowering plant

Erigeron cascadensis, commonly known as Cascade fleabane, is a species of flowering plant in the family Asteraceae. It endemic to the state of Oregon in the northwestern United States, primarily in subalpine meadows in the Cascades mountain range.

Erigeron cascadensis is a perennial herb up to 15 cm (6 inches) tall, producing a taproot. One plant can produce several flower heads, sometimes one per branch, sometimes in groups of 2 or 3. Each head has 30–50 white or purple ray florets plus numerous yellow disc florets.
