= Erigeron pseudotenuicaulis =

Scientific classification
- Kingdom: Plantae
- Clade: Tracheophytes
- Clade: Angiosperms
- Clade: Eudicots
- Clade: Asterids
- Order: Asterales
- Family: Asteraceae
- Genus: Erigeron
- Species: E. pseudotenuicaulis

Binomial name
- Erigeron pseudotenuicaulis Brouillet & Chen Yi Ling

Synonyms
- Erigeron tenuicaulis Y.Ling & Y.L.Chen 1973, not M.E.Jones 1908

Species of flowering plant

Erigeron pseudotenuicaulis is a Chinese species of flowering plants in the family Asteraceae. It grows on hillsides in the province of Sichuan in southwestern China.

Erigeron pseudotenuicaulis is a perennial herb up to 25 cm (10 inches) tall, forming a woody rhizomes. Its flower heads have red ray florets surrounding yellow disc florets.
