= Erigeron vicinus =

Scientific classification
- Kingdom: Plantae
- Clade: Tracheophytes
- Clade: Angiosperms
- Clade: Eudicots
- Clade: Asterids
- Order: Asterales
- Family: Asteraceae
- Genus: Erigeron
- Species: E. vicinus

Binomial name
- Erigeron vicinus G.L.Nesom

Species of flowering plant

Erigeron vicinus is a North American species of flowering plant in the family Asteraceae known by the common names neighbor fleabane and border fleabane. It grows in north-central Mexico (state of Coahuila) and in western Texas in the United States. Some of the populations lie inside Big Bend National Park.

Erigeron vicinus grows on rocky slopes and in canyons. It is a perennial herb rarely up to 30 centimeters (12 inches) tall, producing a taproot and a branching woody caudex. It generally produces 1-2 flower heads per stem. Each head contains 60–95 ray florets, each ray white with a lilac stripe along the middle/ The rays surround numerous yellow disc florets.

The species was named vicinus, meaning "neighbor", in reference to the close proximity of the international border to the location where the plant was first collected.
