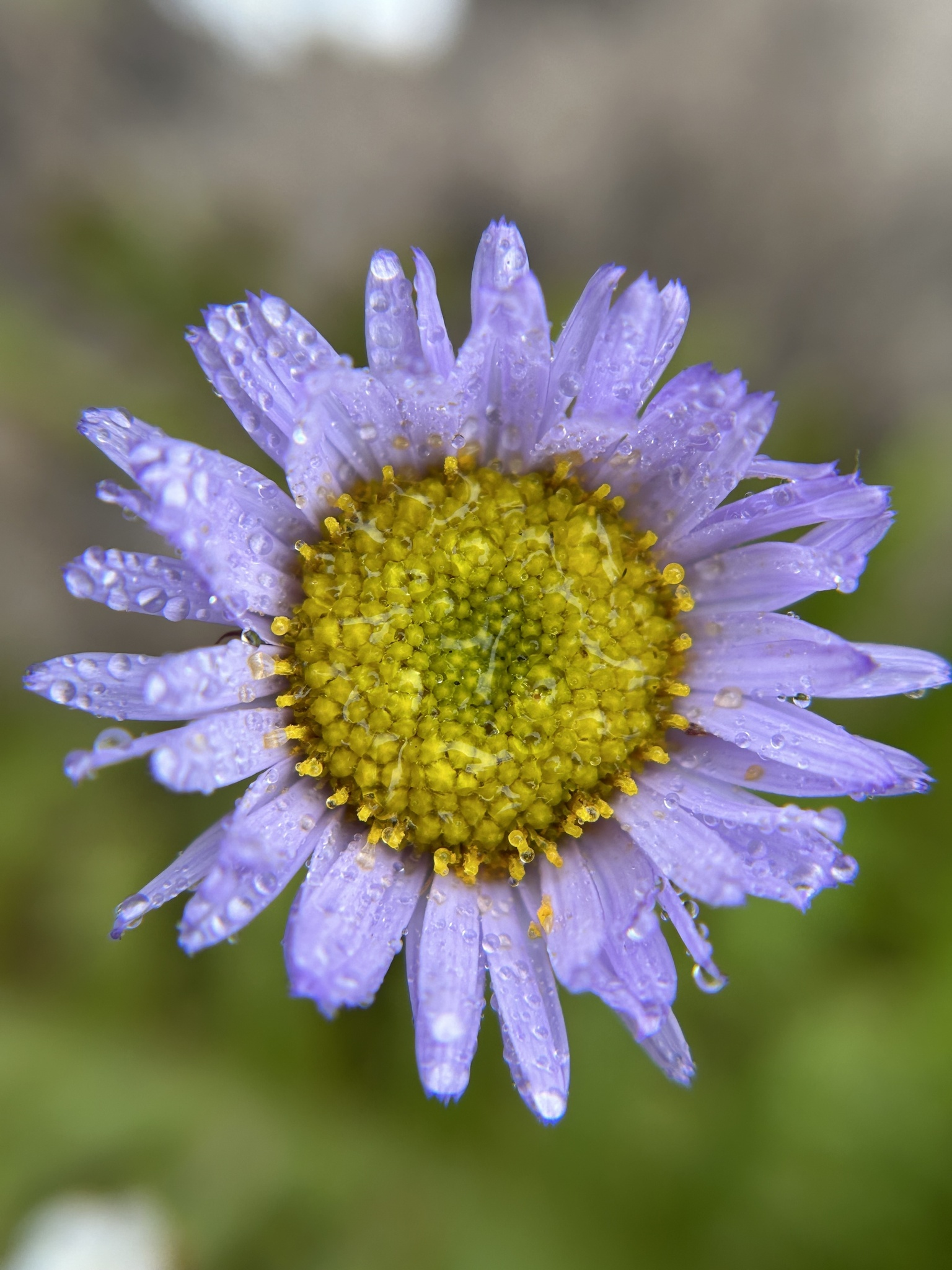

Scientific classification
- Kingdom: Plantae
- Clade: Tracheophytes
- Clade: Angiosperms
- Clade: Eudicots
- Clade: Asterids
- Order: Asterales
- Family: Asteraceae
- Genus: Erigeron
- Species: E. sanctarum

Binomial name
- Erigeron sanctarum S.Wats.

= Erigeron sanctarum =

Species of flowering plant

Erigeron sanctarum is an uncommon species of flowering plant in the family Asteraceae known by the common names saints fleabane and saints daisy. It is endemic to California, where it is known from San Luis Obispo and Santa Barbara Counties including two of the Channel Islands (Santa Rosa and Santa Cruz, both in Santa Barbara County).

Erigeron sanctarum grows in coastal and inland chaparral and oak woodland, and sandy coastal scrub habitat. It is a perennial herb producing an upright stem up to 40 centimeters (16 inches) long surrounded at the base by spoon-shaped or oblong leaves a few centimeters long. There are smaller, narrower leaves along the lower part of the stem. The inflorescence is 1-3 flower heads lined on the lower outside with hairy phyllaries. The head has 45–90 blue or purple ray florets surrounding many yellow disc florets. The fruit is an achene with a pappus of bristles.
