= Erigeron lanuginosus =

Scientific classification
- Kingdom: Plantae
- Clade: Tracheophytes
- Clade: Angiosperms
- Clade: Eudicots
- Clade: Asterids
- Order: Asterales
- Family: Asteraceae
- Genus: Erigeron
- Species: E. lanuginosus

Binomial name
- Erigeron lanuginosus Y.L.Chen

Species of flowering plant

Erigeron lanuginosus is a Chinese species of flowering plants in the family Asteraceae. It grows on alpine slopes at high elevations in Tibet.

Erigeron lanuginosus is a perennial, clump-forming herb up to 25 cm (10 inches) tall, forming a branching, woody rhizome. Its flower heads have bright purple ray florets surrounding yellow disc florets.
