= Erigeron fukuyamae =

Scientific classification
- Kingdom: Plantae
- Clade: Tracheophytes
- Clade: Angiosperms
- Clade: Eudicots
- Clade: Asterids
- Order: Asterales
- Family: Asteraceae
- Genus: Erigeron
- Species: E. fukuyamae

Binomial name
- Erigeron fukuyamae Kitam.

Synonyms
- Erigeron morrisonensis var. fukuyamae (Kitam.) Kitam.

Species of flowering plant

Erigeron fukuyamae is an Asian species of flowering plants in the family Asteraceae. It has been found only in alpine meadows at high elevations in Taiwan in East Asia.

Erigeron fukuyamae is a perennial, clump-forming herb up to 30 cm (12 inches) tall, forming short rhizomes and a branching underground caudex. Its flower heads have red ray florets surrounding yellow disc florets.
