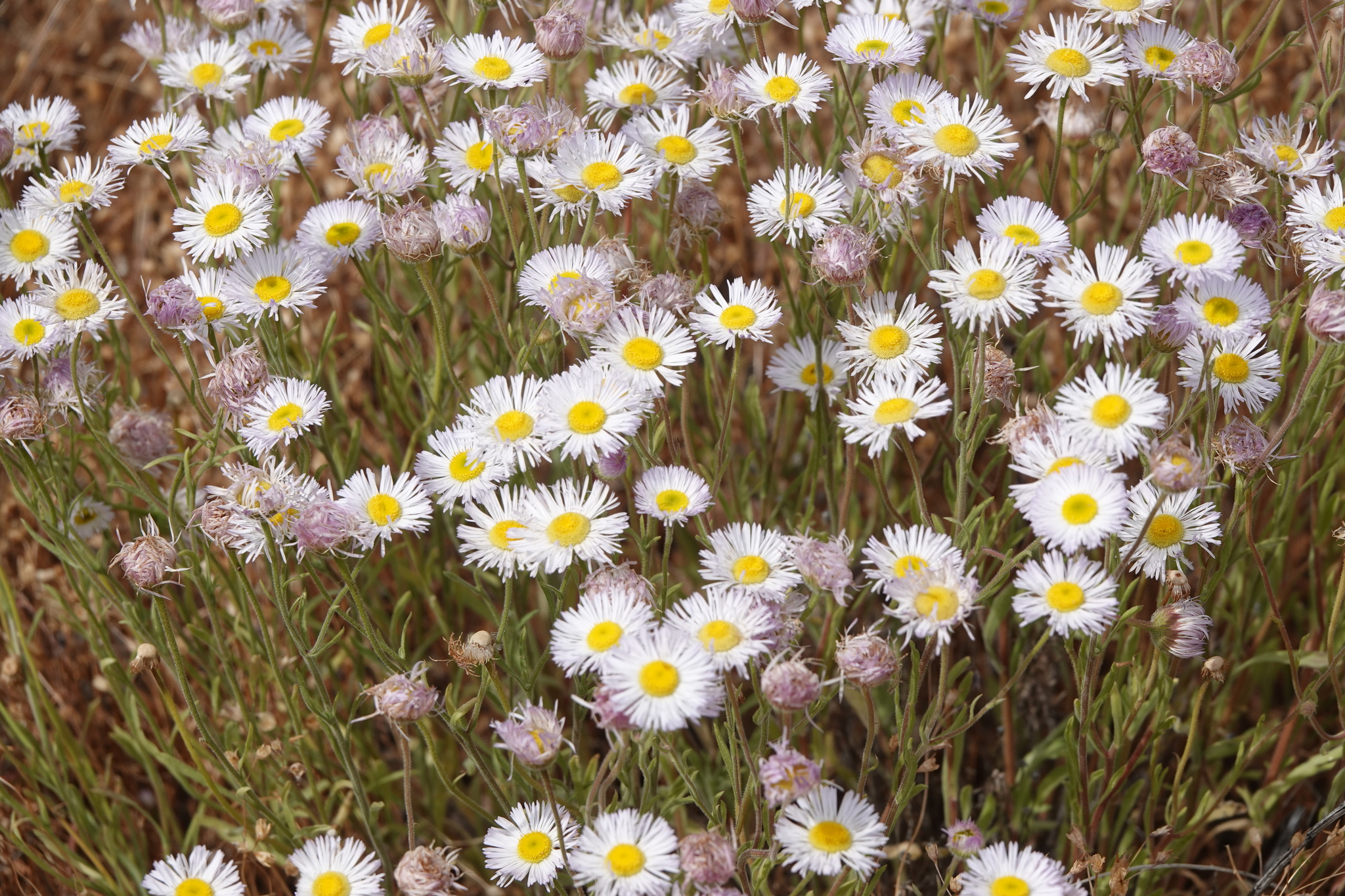

Conservation status
- Imperiled (NatureServe)

Scientific classification
- Kingdom: Plantae
- Clade: Tracheophytes
- Clade: Angiosperms
- Clade: Eudicots
- Clade: Asterids
- Order: Asterales
- Family: Asteraceae
- Genus: Erigeron
- Species: E. multiceps

Binomial name
- Erigeron multiceps Greene

= Erigeron multiceps =

Species of flowering plant

Erigeron multiceps is a species of flowering plant in the family Asteraceae known by the common names Kern River daisy and Kern River fleabane. It is endemic to California, where it is known mostly from the Kern Plateau in the southern High Sierra Nevada of eastern Tulare County. It is a perennial herb growing a hairy stem up to about 20 centimeters tall from a taproot and caudex. The base of the stem is surrounded by oblong leaves 2 to 5 centimeters long, and there are some smaller leaves along the length of the stem. The inflorescence produces hairy, glandular flower heads filled with yellow disc florets and a fringe of up to 125 thin, flat white to purple-tinged ray florets. The fruit is an achene with a pappus of bristles.
