= Erigeron latifolius =

Scientific classification
- Kingdom: Plantae
- Clade: Tracheophytes
- Clade: Angiosperms
- Clade: Eudicots
- Clade: Asterids
- Order: Asterales
- Family: Asteraceae
- Genus: Erigeron
- Species: E. latifolius

Binomial name
- Erigeron latifolius Hao Zhang & Zhi-feng Zhang

Species of flowering plant

Erigeron latifolius is a rare and little-known Chinese species of flowering plants in the family Asteraceae. It grows on mountain meadows at high elevations in Sichuan province in southwestern China. It was not formally described as a new species until 2010.

Erigeron latifolius is a perennial clump-forming herb up to 50 cm (20 inches) tall, forming a rhizome and an underground caudex. Its flower heads have purple ray florets surrounding yellow disc florets.
