= Erigeron pacayensis =

Scientific classification
- Kingdom: Plantae
- Clade: Tracheophytes
- Clade: Angiosperms
- Clade: Eudicots
- Clade: Asterids
- Order: Asterales
- Family: Asteraceae
- Genus: Erigeron
- Species: E. pacayensis

Binomial name
- Erigeron pacayensis S.F.Blake

Synonyms
- Erigeron deamii B.L.Rob.; Erigeron tripartitus S.F.Blake

Species of plant

Erigeron pacayensis is a Central American species of flowering plant in the family Asteraceae. It has been found only in Guatemala, El Salvador, and Honduras.

Erigeron pacayensis is a perennial subshrub with a woody stem up to 55 cm (22 inches) tall, producing a woody taproot. Leaves are very narrow, almost thread-like, though with a few teeth along the edges. The plant produces flower heads on long, thin stalks. Each head contains 50-120 white ray florets surrounding numerous yellow disc florets.
