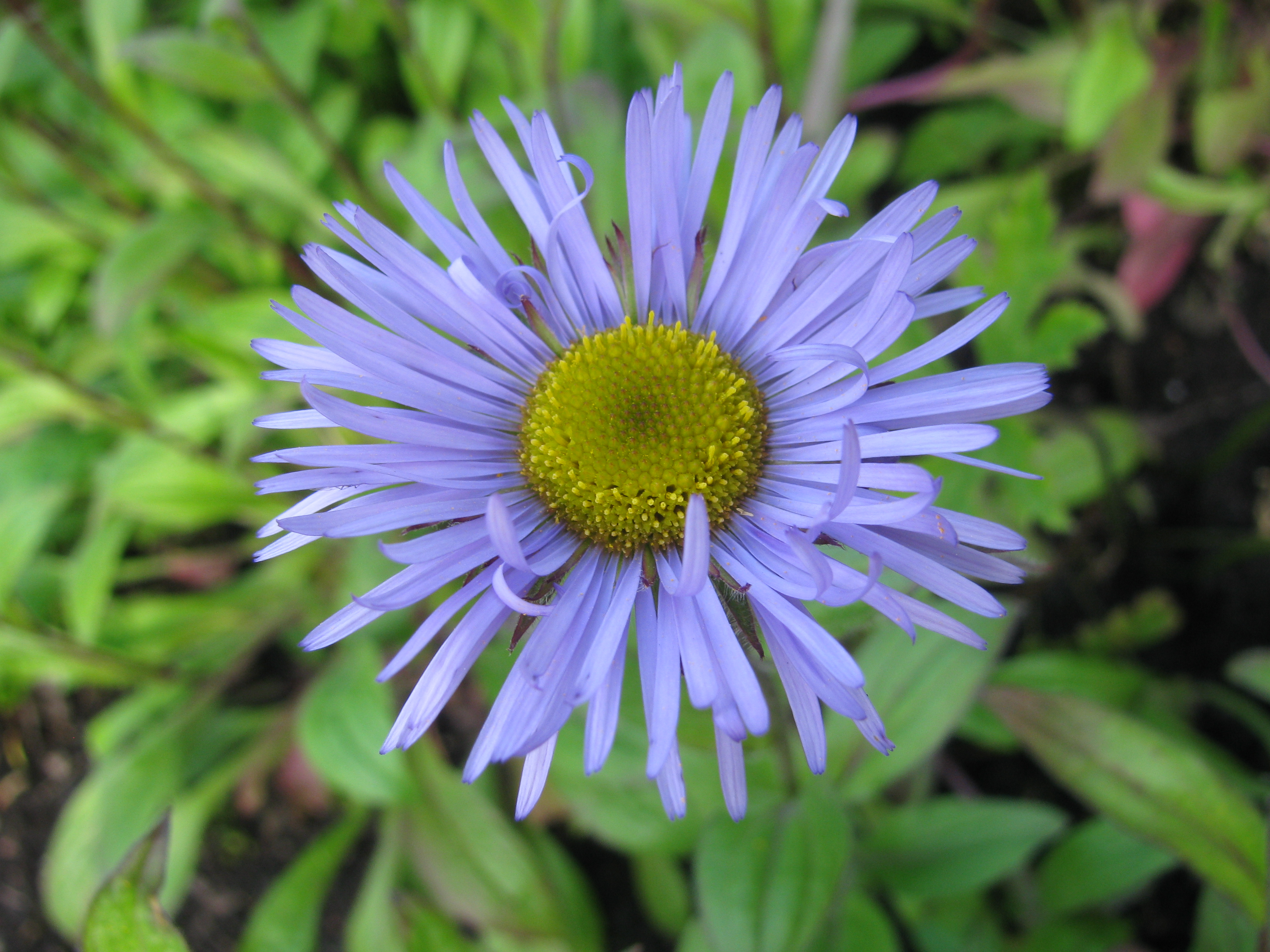
- Royal Botanic Garden Edinburgh

Scientific classification
- Kingdom: Plantae
- Clade: Tracheophytes
- Clade: Angiosperms
- Clade: Eudicots
- Clade: Asterids
- Order: Asterales
- Family: Asteraceae
- Genus: Erigeron
- Species: E. multiradiatus

Binomial name
- Erigeron multiradiatus (Lindl. ex DC.) Benth. ex C.B.Clarke

Synonyms
- Erigeron multiradiatum (Lindl. ex DC.) Benth. ex C.B.Clarke; Aster inuloides D.Don; Aster multiradiatus Wall.; Aster roylei Onno; Erigeron radiosus Spreng. ex DC.; Stenactis multiradiata Lindl. ex DC.

= Erigeron multiradiatus =

Species of flowering plant

Erigeron multiradiatus is an Asian species of flowering plants in the family Asteraceae known by the common name Himalayan fleabane. It grows at high elevations in the mountains of central and south-central Asia, in Iran, Afghanistan, Bhutan, India, Nepal and Tibet.

Erigeron multiradiatus is a branching perennial herb up to 60 centimeters (2 feet) tall, producing a woody rhizome. The plant generally has several Flower heads per stem, each head containing numerous lilac or lavender or purple ray florets surrounding many yellow disc florets.
