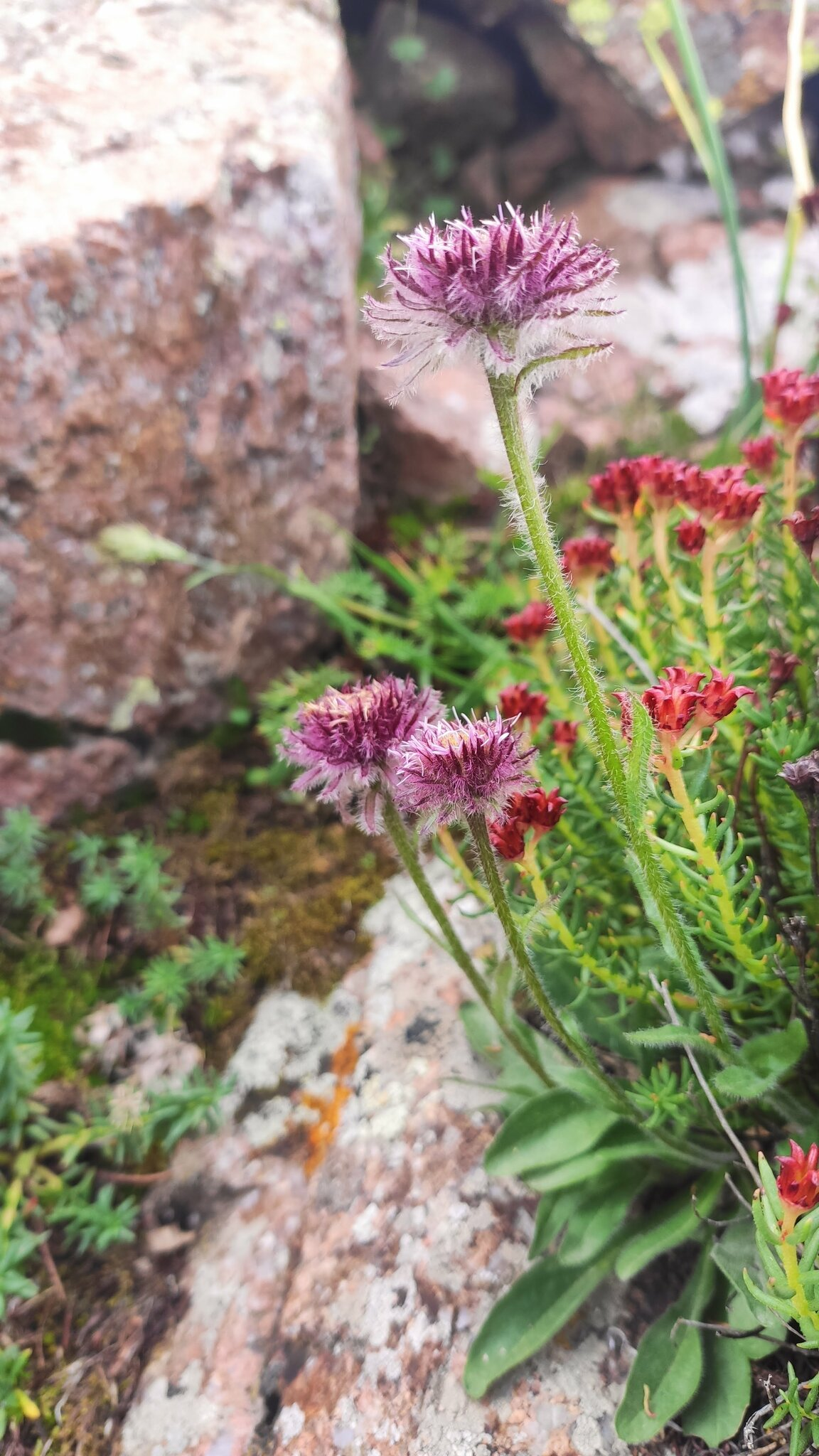

Scientific classification
- Kingdom: Plantae
- Clade: Tracheophytes
- Clade: Angiosperms
- Clade: Eudicots
- Clade: Asterids
- Order: Asterales
- Family: Asteraceae
- Genus: Erigeron
- Species: E. lachnocephalus

Binomial name
- Erigeron lachnocephalus Botsch.

Synonyms
- Erigeron turkestanicus Vierh. 1906, not (Regel & Schmalh.) O.Fedtsch. 1903.

= Erigeron lachnocephalus =

Species of flowering plant

Erigeron lachnocephalus is an Asian species of flowering plants in the family Asteraceae. It grows on rocky slopes and in alpine meadows at high elevations in Xinjiang, Kazakhstan, and Uzbekistan.

Erigeron lachnocephalus is a perennial, clump-forming herb up to 15 cm (6 inches) tall, forming a branching, woody caudex. Its flower heads have pink or lilac ray florets surrounding yellow disc florets.
