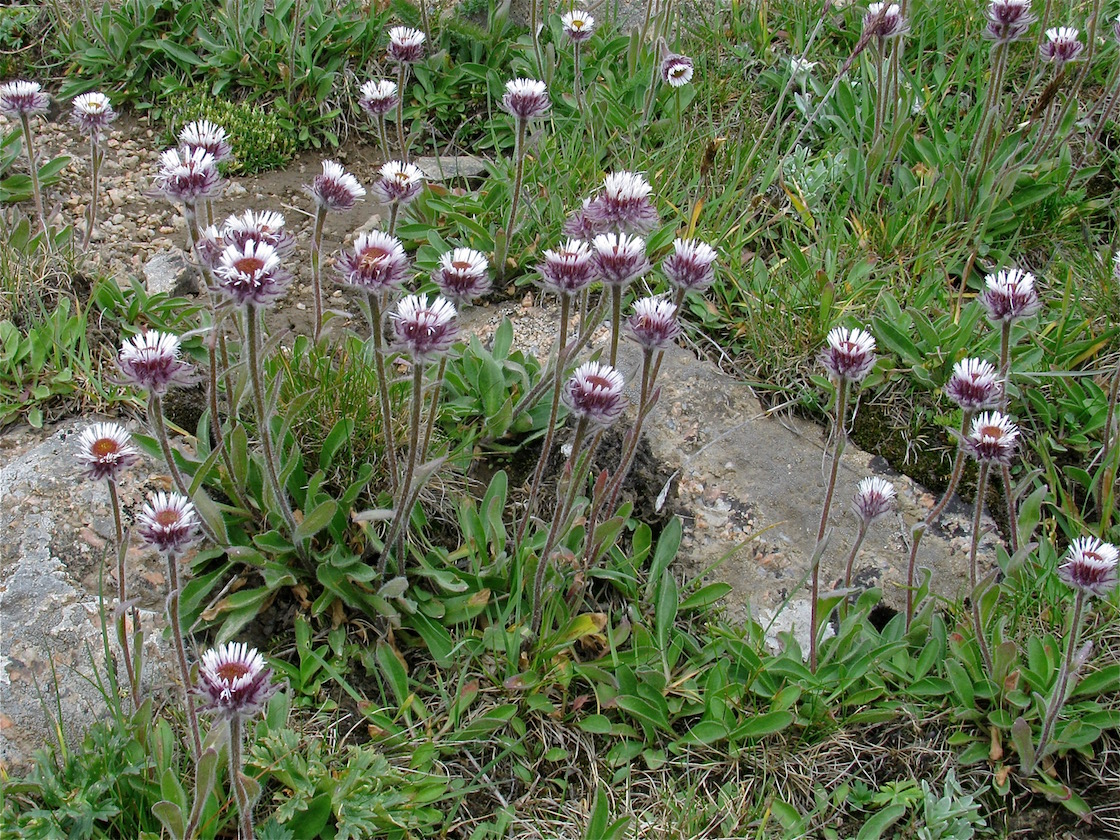

Scientific classification
- Kingdom: Plantae
- Clade: Tracheophytes
- Clade: Angiosperms
- Clade: Eudicots
- Clade: Asterids
- Order: Asterales
- Family: Asteraceae
- Genus: Erigeron
- Species: E. petiolaris

Binomial name
- Erigeron petiolaris Vierh. 1906 not Greene 1912

Synonyms
- Erigeron pseudoneglectus Popov

= Erigeron petiolaris =

Species of flowering plant

Erigeron petiolaris is a species of flowering plant in the family Asteraceae. It is native to northern and central Asia (Siberia, Xinjiang, Kazakhstan, Uzbekistan).

Erigeron petiolaris a perennial herb up to 28 cm tall, with a short rhizome. It produces flower heads one at a time or in groups of 2 or 3, each head containing pink or white ray florets and yellow disc florets. The species grows in arctic or alpine regions on rocky slopes.
