= Erigeron porsildii =

Scientific classification
- Kingdom: Plantae
- Clade: Tracheophytes
- Clade: Angiosperms
- Clade: Eudicots
- Clade: Asterids
- Order: Asterales
- Family: Asteraceae
- Genus: Erigeron
- Species: E. porsildii

Binomial name
- Erigeron porsildii G.L.Nesom & D.F.Murray

Synonyms
- Erigeron grandiflorus subsp. arcticus A.E.Porsild 1975, not E. arcticus Rouy 1903

Species of flowering plant

Erigeron porsildii is an Arctic species of flowering plant in the family Asteraceae known by the common name Porsild's Arctic fleabane. It has been found in Alaska, Yukon, and the Northwest Territories.

Erigeron porsildii is a perennial herb up to 25 centimeters (10 inches) tall, spreading by means of underground rhizomes. Leaves and stems are covered with many hairs The plant generally produces only one flower head per stem. Each head has 65–110 blue, lavender, or white ray florets surrounding numerous yellow disc florets. The species grows on cliffs, talus, gravel, and dry tundra.
