= Erigeron geiseri =

Scientific classification
- Kingdom: Plantae
- Clade: Embryophytes
- Clade: Tracheophytes
- Clade: Angiosperms
- Clade: Eudicots
- Clade: Asterids
- Order: Asterales
- Family: Asteraceae
- Genus: Erigeron
- Species: E. geiseri

Binomial name
- Erigeron geiseri Shinners

Species of flowering plant

Erigeron geiseri is a North American species of flowering plants in the family Asteraceae known by the common name Geiser's fleabane.

Erigeron geiseri has been found only in the southern part of the Great Plains of the United States, in the states of Oklahoma and Texas. It grows on prairies, fields, fencerows and roadsides.

Erigeron geiseri grows up to 40 cm (16 inches) tall, and produces a slender taproot. The plant sometimes produces as many as 20 flower heads per stem, each head containing golden yellow disc florets surrounded by as many as 70 white ray florets.
