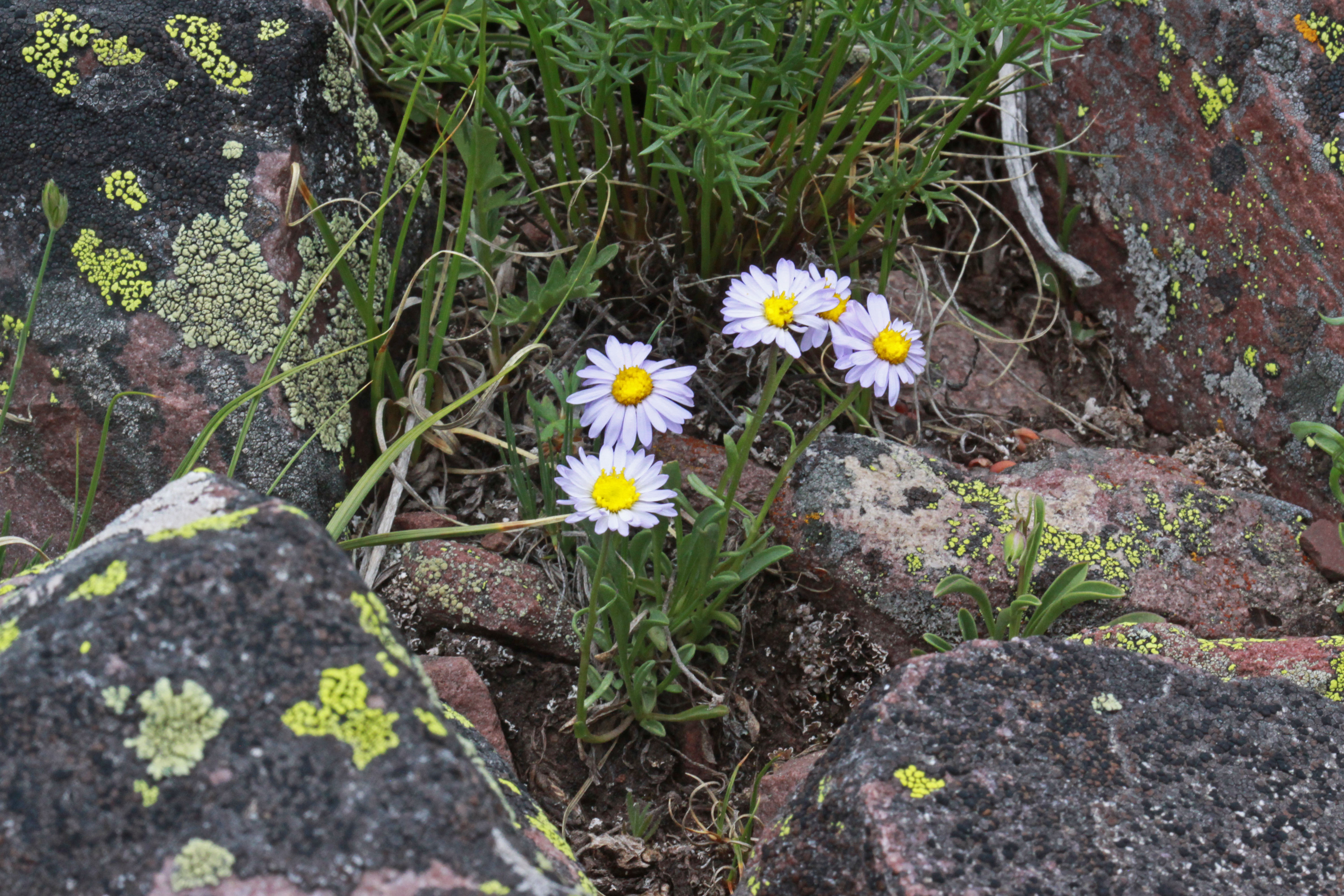

Scientific classification
- Kingdom: Plantae
- Clade: Tracheophytes
- Clade: Angiosperms
- Clade: Eudicots
- Clade: Asterids
- Order: Asterales
- Family: Asteraceae
- Genus: Erigeron
- Species: E. untermannii

Binomial name
- Erigeron untermannii S.L.Welsh & Goodrich 1983

Synonyms
- Erigeron carringtoniae S.L.Welsh

= Erigeron untermannii =

Species of flowering plant

Erigeron untermannii is a North American species of flowering plant in the family Asteraceae known by the common name Indian Canyon fleabane. It is native to the western United States, only in the state of Utah.

Erigeron untermannii grows in sunny locations in sagebrush and in open coniferous woodlands. It is a small perennial herb rarely more than 8 centimeters (3.2 inches) tall, producing rhizomes and a branching underground caudex. The inflorescence is made up of only one flower heads per stem. Each head contains 14–30 white, pink, or purple ray florets surrounding numerous yellow disc florets.
