= Erigeron mancus =

Scientific classification
- Kingdom: Plantae
- Clade: Tracheophytes
- Clade: Angiosperms
- Clade: Eudicots
- Clade: Asterids
- Order: Asterales
- Family: Asteraceae
- Genus: Erigeron
- Species: E. mancus

Binomial name
- Erigeron mancus Rydb.

Synonyms
- Erigeron pinnatisectus var. insolens J.F.Macbr. & Payson

Species of flowering plant

Erigeron mancus is a rare North American species of flowering plant in the family Asteraceae known by the common names depauperate fleabane and imperfect fleabane. It has been found only in southeastern Utah.

Erigeron mancus is a short perennial herb rarely more than 7 centimeters (2.8 inches) tall, producing a woody taproot. The leaves are pinnately lobed near the bottom of the plant, but not further up the stem. The plant generally produces only one flower heads per stem, each with several yellow disc florets, but no ray florets. The species grows in alpine meadows, ridge tops, and rocky slopes at high elevation in the mountains.
