= Erigeron pseudoseravschanicus =

Scientific classification
- Kingdom: Plantae
- Clade: Tracheophytes
- Clade: Angiosperms
- Clade: Eudicots
- Clade: Asterids
- Order: Asterales
- Family: Asteraceae
- Genus: Erigeron
- Species: E. pseudoseravschanicus

Binomial name
- Erigeron pseudoseravschanicus Botsch.

Species of flowering plant

Erigeron pseudoseravschanicus is an Asian species of flowering plants in the family Asteraceae. It grows on alpine meadows and forest margins in Xinjiang, Kazakhstan, Uzbekistan, and Siberia.

Erigeron pseudoseravschanicus is a perennial, clumping-forming herb up to 60 cm (5 feet) tall, forming a thick woody rhizomes. Its flower heads have pink or lilac ray florets surrounding yellow disc florets.
