= Erigeron barbarensis =

Scientific classification
- Kingdom: Plantae
- Clade: Tracheophytes
- Clade: Angiosperms
- Clade: Eudicots
- Clade: Asterids
- Order: Asterales
- Family: Asteraceae
- Genus: Erigeron
- Species: E. barbarensis

Binomial name
- Erigeron barbarensis G.L.Nesom & T.Van Devender

Species of flowering plant

Erigeron barbarensis is a rare Mexican species of flowering plants in the family Asteraceae. It grows in southern Sonora and southwestern Chihuahua.

Erigeron barbarensis is an annual herb up to 55 cm (22 inches) tall, producing a slender taproot. Each plant produces 3-8 flower heads per stem, with 32-48 white ray florets surrounding yellow disc florets.
