= Erigeron kunshanensis =

Scientific classification
- Kingdom: Plantae
- Clade: Tracheophytes
- Clade: Angiosperms
- Clade: Eudicots
- Clade: Asterids
- Order: Asterales
- Family: Asteraceae
- Genus: Erigeron
- Species: E. kunshanensis

Binomial name
- Erigeron kunshanensis Yong Ling & Yi Ling Chen

Species of flowering plant

Erigeron kunshanensis is a Chinese species of flowering plants in the family Asteraceae. It grows on rocky slopes and in alpine meadows at high elevations in the province of Yunnan in southwestern China.

Erigeron kunshanensis is a perennial, clump-forming herb up to 20 cm (8 inches ) tall, forming thick, woody rhizomes. Its flower heads have purple ray florets surrounding yellow disc florets.
