= Erigeron aquarius =

Scientific classification
- Kingdom: Plantae
- Clade: Tracheophytes
- Clade: Angiosperms
- Clade: Eudicots
- Clade: Asterids
- Order: Asterales
- Family: Asteraceae
- Genus: Erigeron
- Species: E. aquarius

Binomial name
- Erigeron aquarius Standl. & Steyerm.

Species of flowering plant

Erigeron aquarius is a Central American species of flowering plant in the family Asteraceae. It has been found only in Guatemala and Honduras. The type specimen was collected in Guatemala in 1939.

Erigeron aquarius is a perennial subshrub with a woody stem up to 50 cm (20 inches) tall, producing a woody underground rhizome. Stems are sometimes erect (standing straight up), moderately hairy. Leaves are moderately hairy, some produced close to the ground plus others higher on the stem. The plant produces flower heads on long, thin stalks. Each head contains 80-180 white ray florets surrounding numerous yellow disc florets.
