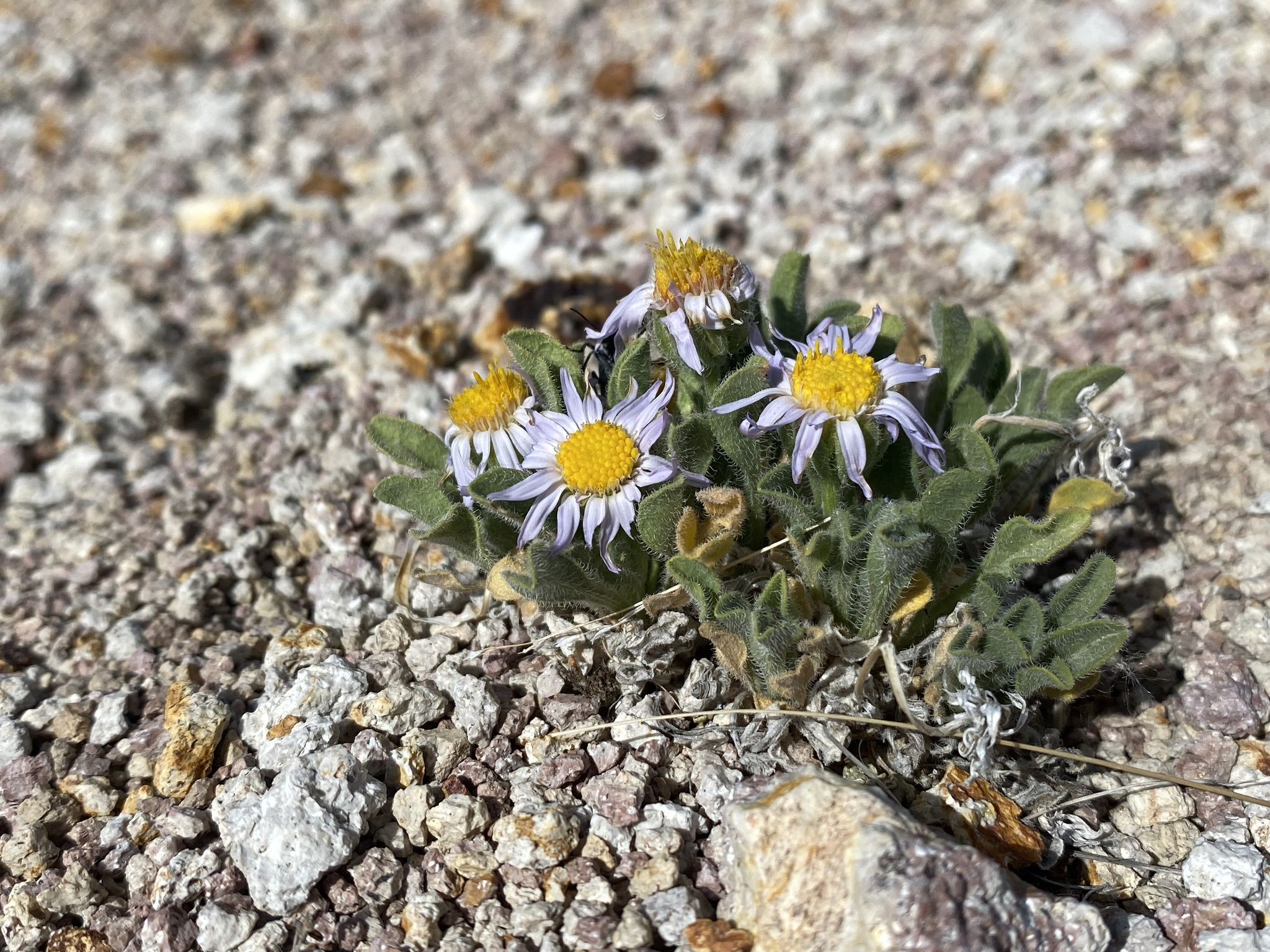
- In Nevada

Scientific classification
- Kingdom: Plantae
- Clade: Tracheophytes
- Clade: Angiosperms
- Clade: Eudicots
- Clade: Asterids
- Order: Asterales
- Family: Asteraceae
- Genus: Erigeron
- Species: E. latus

Binomial name
- Erigeron latus (A.Nelson & J.F.Macbr.) Cronquist

Synonyms
- Erigeron poliospermus var. latus A.Nelson & J.F.Macbr.

= Erigeron latus =

Species of flowering plant

Erigeron latus is a rare species of flowering plant in the family Asteraceae known by the common name broad fleabane. It is native to the Great Basin of the western United States. The natural range is small but split between three counties in three states: Malheur County in Oregon, Owyhee County in Idaho, and Elko County in Nevada.

== Description ==
Erigeron latus is a small perennial herb rarely more than 8 centimeters (0.8 inches) tall, producing a woody taproot. The leaves are mostly crowded around the base of the stem. Both the stem and the leaves are covered with stiff hairs. The plant generally produces only one flower head per stem, each head with up to 25 purple or pink ray florets surrounding numerous yellow disc florets.
