= Erigeron altaicus =

Scientific classification
- Kingdom: Plantae
- Clade: Tracheophytes
- Clade: Angiosperms
- Clade: Eudicots
- Clade: Asterids
- Order: Asterales
- Family: Asteraceae
- Genus: Erigeron
- Species: E. altaicus

Binomial name
- Erigeron altaicus Popov

Species of flowering plant

Erigeron altaicus is an Asian species of flowering plants in the family Asteraceae. It is native to Siberia, Kazakhstan, and Xinjiang.

Erigeron altaicus is a perennial, clump-forming herb up to 50 cm (20 inches) tall. Its flower heads have lilac ray florets surrounding yellow disc florets.
