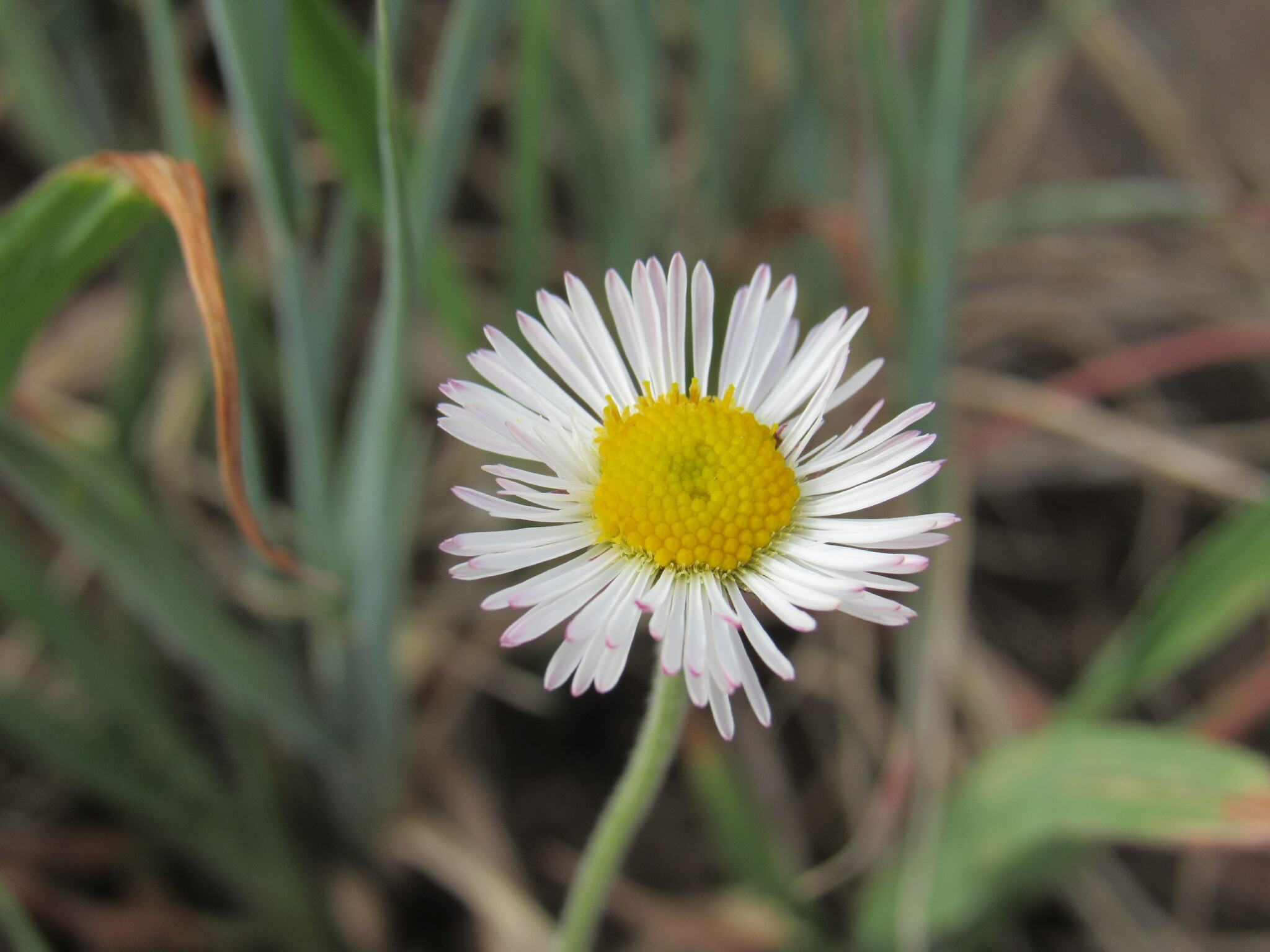

Conservation status
- Secure (NatureServe)

Scientific classification
- Kingdom: Plantae
- Clade: Tracheophytes
- Clade: Angiosperms
- Clade: Eudicots
- Clade: Asterids
- Order: Asterales
- Family: Asteraceae
- Genus: Erigeron
- Species: E. tracyi

Binomial name
- Erigeron tracyi Greene

Synonyms
- Synonymy: Erigeron cinereus A.Gray 1849, not Hooker & Arnott 1836; Erigeron colomexicanus A.Nelson; Erigeron commixtus Greene; Erigeron dicladus Greene; Erigeron divergens var. cinereus A.Gray; Erigeron tephrodes Greene; Erigeron williamsii Phil.

= Erigeron tracyi =

Species of flowering plant

Erigeron tracyi is a North American species of flowering plant in the family Asteraceae known by the common name running fleabane. It is native to northern Mexico (Baja California, Chihuahua, Coahuila, Durango, Sonora, Zacatecas) and the southwestern United States (Arizona, Colorado, Kansas, Nevada, New Mexico, Oklahoma, Texas, Utah).

Erigeron tracyi grows in pastures and open woodlands as well as on roadsides and in fence rows. It is an biennial or perennial herb up to 45 centimeters (17 inches) tall, producing unbranched underground caudex. Leaves are narrowly oblanceolate, up to 13 cm (2.5 inches) long. The inflorescence is made up of 1-60 flower heads per stem, in a loose array. Each head contains 60–120 blue, white or pale lavender ray florets surrounding numerous yellow disc florets.
