= Erigeron pauper =

Conservation status
- Endangered (IUCN 3.1)

Scientific classification
- Kingdom: Plantae
- Clade: Tracheophytes
- Clade: Angiosperms
- Clade: Eudicots
- Clade: Asterids
- Order: Asterales
- Family: Asteraceae
- Genus: Erigeron
- Species: E. pauper

Binomial name
- Erigeron pauper Benoist

Species of flowering plant

Erigeron pauper is a species of flowering plant in the family Asteraceae. It is endemic to Ecuador, where it is known from a single collection made in 1931 on the Pichincha Volcano. Because the volcano is adjacent to Quito, urban growth is considered to be a threat to its habitat.
