= Erigeron kiukiangensis =

Scientific classification
- Kingdom: Plantae
- Clade: Tracheophytes
- Clade: Angiosperms
- Clade: Eudicots
- Clade: Asterids
- Order: Asterales
- Family: Asteraceae
- Genus: Erigeron
- Species: E. kiukiangensis

Binomial name
- Erigeron kiukiangensis Ling & Y.L.Chen

Species of flowering plant

Erigeron kiukiangensis is a Chinese species of flowering plants in the family Asteraceae. It grows on mountain slopes in southwestern China (Tibet and Yunnan).

Erigeron kiukiangensis is a perennial, clump-forming herb up to 55 cm (22 jinches) tall, forming woody rhizomes. Its flower heads have red ray florets surrounding yellow disc florets.
