= Erigeron tianschanicus =

Scientific classification
- Kingdom: Plantae
- Clade: Tracheophytes
- Clade: Angiosperms
- Clade: Eudicots
- Clade: Asterids
- Order: Asterales
- Family: Asteraceae
- Genus: Erigeron
- Species: E. tianschanicus

Binomial name
- Erigeron tianschanicus Botsch. 1959

Synonyms
- Erigeron coeruleus Popov 1948, not E. caeruleus Urban (1912)

Species of flowering plant

Erigeron tianschanicus is an Asian species of flowering plant in the family Asteraceae. It grows on open slopes in Xinjiang and Kazakhstan.

Erigeron tianschanicus is a perennial, clumping-forming herb up to 60 cm (2 feet) tall, producing woody rhizomes and a branching caudex. Its flower heads have blue ray florets surrounding yellow disc florets.
