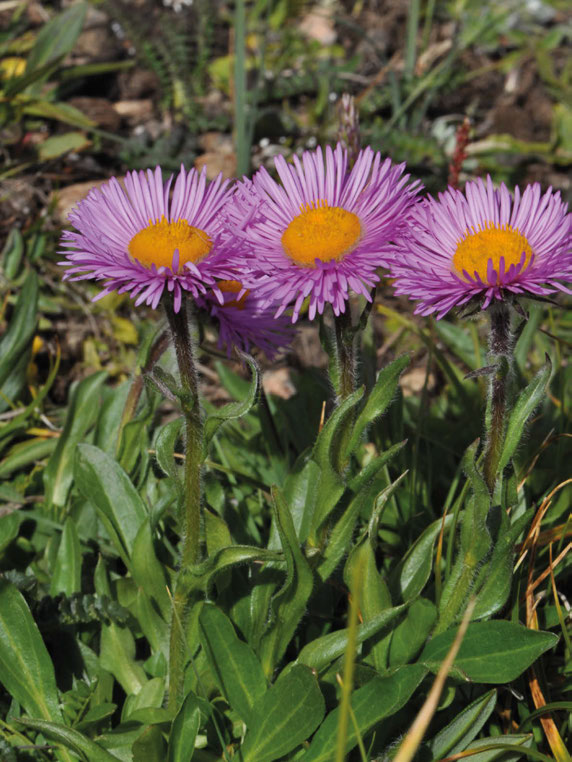

Scientific classification
- Kingdom: Plantae
- Clade: Embryophytes
- Clade: Tracheophytes
- Clade: Angiosperms
- Clade: Eudicots
- Clade: Asterids
- Order: Asterales
- Family: Asteraceae
- Genus: Erigeron
- Species: E. allochrous

Binomial name
- Erigeron allochrous Botsch.

= Erigeron allochrous =

Species of flowering plant

Erigeron allochrous is an Asian species of flowering plants in the family Asteraceae. It is native to Kazakhstan and Xinjiang in central Asia.

Erigeron allochrous is a perennial, clump-forming herb up to 28 cm (11.2 inches) tall. Its flower heads have lilac ray florets and yellow disc florets.
