= Erigeron abajoensis =

Scientific classification
- Kingdom: Plantae
- Clade: Tracheophytes
- Clade: Angiosperms
- Clade: Eudicots
- Clade: Asterids
- Order: Asterales
- Family: Asteraceae
- Genus: Erigeron
- Species: E. abajoensis

Binomial name
- Erigeron abajoensis Cronquist

Synonyms
- Erigeron awapensis S.L.Welsh

Species of flowering plant

Erigeron abajoensis, the Abajo fleabane, is a species of Erigeron in the family Asteraceae. It is native to Utah in the western United States, and has been found also in neighboring parts of Arizona, Colorado, and New Mexico. It grows on sunny, dry, rocky slopes generally at elevations of 2,270 to 3,400 meters (7,450 to 11,150 ft).

Erigeron abajoensis is a short (5 to 25 cm or 2-10 inches tall) perennial plant. The leaves are narrowly oblanceolate (i.e. with a broad-rounded apex and a tapering base), set with stiff, straight bristles and located at the base of the stem. The flower heads are sometimes produced one at a time, sometimes in groups of 3 or 4. Each head contains as many as 60 blue or pink or white ray florets and many yellow disc florets, all produced in the summer.

The species is named for the Abajo Mountains in southern Utah.
