= Erigeron himalajensis =

Scientific classification
- Kingdom: Plantae
- Clade: Tracheophytes
- Clade: Angiosperms
- Clade: Eudicots
- Clade: Asterids
- Order: Asterales
- Family: Asteraceae
- Genus: Erigeron
- Species: E. himalajensis

Binomial name
- Erigeron himalajensis Vierh. 1906

Species of flowering plant

Erigeron himalajensis is an Asian species of flowering plants in the family Asteraceae. It grows on stony slopes and the margins of forests in the mountains of Afghanistan, Tibet, Sichuan, and Yunnan.

Erigeron himalajensis is a perennial, clump-forming herb up to 60 cm (5 feet) tall, forming woody rhizomes. Its flower heads have pink or purple ray florets surrounding yellow disc florets.
