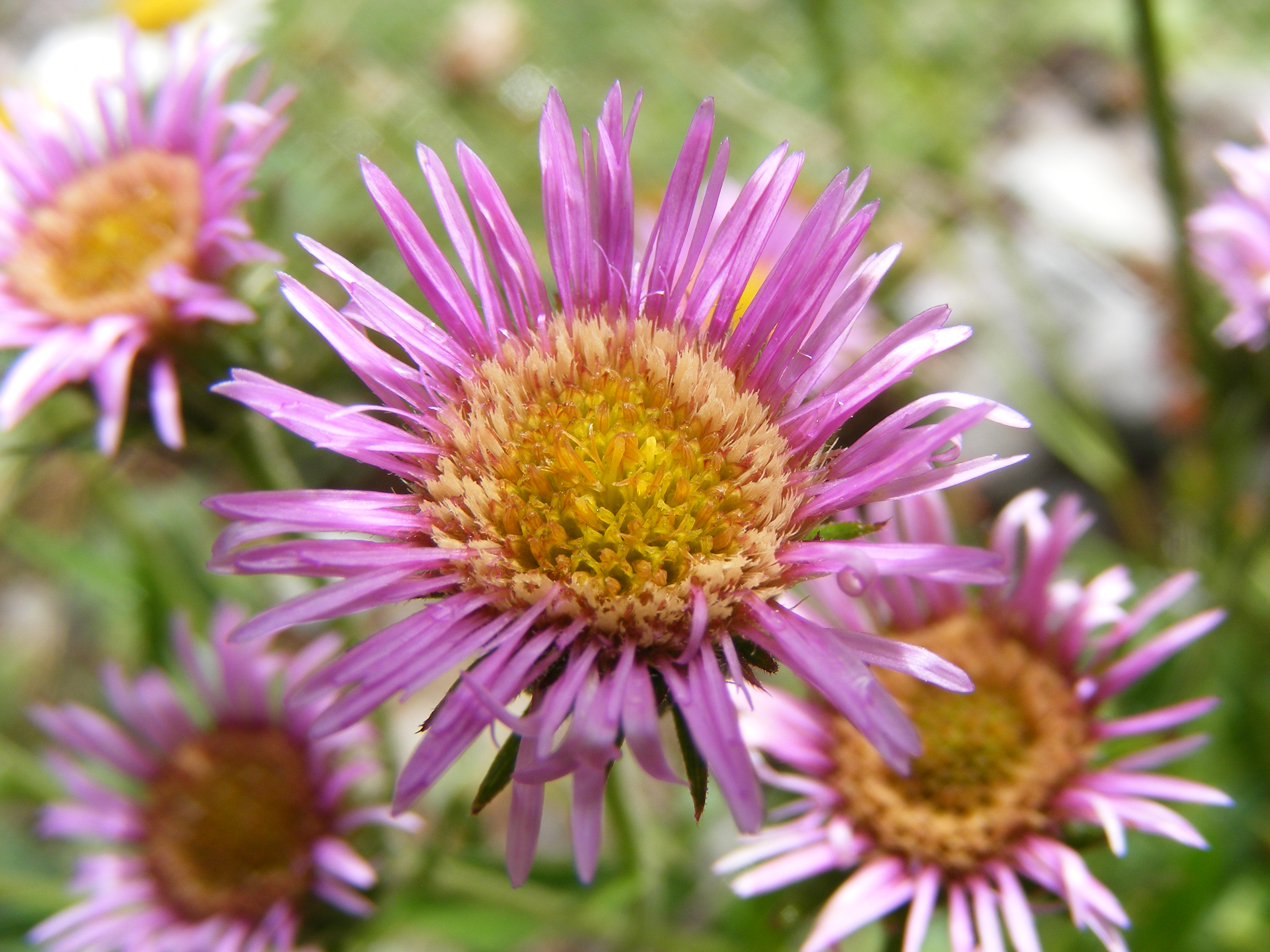

Scientific classification
- Kingdom: Plantae
- Clade: Tracheophytes
- Clade: Angiosperms
- Clade: Eudicots
- Clade: Asterids
- Order: Asterales
- Family: Asteraceae
- Genus: Erigeron
- Species: E. atticus

Binomial name
- Erigeron atticus Vill.

Synonyms
- Trimorpha attica (Vill.) Vierh.; Aster villarsii E.H.L.Krause; Erigeron carpaticus Griseb. & Schenk; Erigeron glandulosus Hegetschw.; Erigeron intermedius Nyman; Erigeron rupestris Gremli; Erigeron villarsii Bellardi

= Erigeron atticus =

Species of flowering plant

Erigeron atticus is a European species of flowering plant in the family Asteraceae. It is native to France, Spain, Italy, Switzerland, Austria, Germany, Poland, Czech Republic, Slovakia, Bulgaria, the former Yugoslavia, Hungary, and Romania.

Erigeron atticus is an herb up to 60 cm (2 feet) tall. One plant usually produces several flower heads, each with white, blue or purple ray florets surrounding many yellow disc florets.
