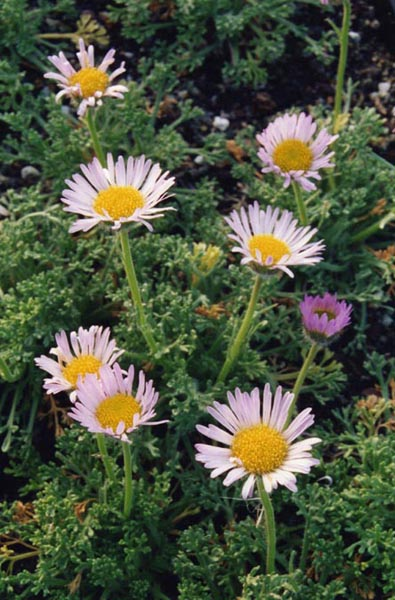

Scientific classification
- Kingdom: Plantae
- Clade: Tracheophytes
- Clade: Angiosperms
- Clade: Eudicots
- Clade: Asterids
- Order: Asterales
- Family: Asteraceae
- Genus: Erigeron
- Species: E. trifidus

Binomial name
- Erigeron trifidus Hook. 1834 not Schltdl. 1856 nor Larrañaga 1923

= Erigeron trifidus =

Species of flowering plant

Erigeron trifidus is a Canadian species of flowering plant in the family Asteraceae known by the common name Alberta fleabane. It is native to the provinces of Alberta and British Columbia in western Canada.

Erigeron trifidus grows on talus and scree slopes in alpine zones at high elevations. It is a small perennial herb rarely more than 10 centimeters (4 inches) tall, producing a branching underground caudex. Leaves are usually 3-lobed, up to 3 cm (1.2 inches) long. The inflorescence is made up of only one flower heads per stem. Each head contains 20–40 white, lavender, or pink ray florets surrounding numerous yellow disc florets.
