= Erigeron seravschanicus =

Scientific classification
- Kingdom: Plantae
- Clade: Tracheophytes
- Clade: Angiosperms
- Clade: Eudicots
- Clade: Asterids
- Order: Asterales
- Family: Asteraceae
- Genus: Erigeron
- Species: E. seravschanicus

Binomial name
- Erigeron seravschanicus Popov

Species of flowering plant

Erigeron seravschanicus is an Asian species of flowering plants in the family Asteraceae. It grows in subalpine meadows in Xinjiang, Kazakhstan, and Uzbekistan.

Erigeron seravschanicus is a perennial, clumping-forming herb up to 30 cm (12 inches) tall, forming slender rhizomes. Its flower heads have lilac ray florets surrounding yellow disc florets.
