= Erigeron multifolius =

Scientific classification
- Kingdom: Plantae
- Clade: Tracheophytes
- Clade: Angiosperms
- Clade: Eudicots
- Clade: Asterids
- Order: Asterales
- Family: Asteraceae
- Genus: Erigeron
- Species: E. multifolius

Binomial name
- Erigeron multifolius Hand.-Mazz.

Species of flowering plant

Erigeron multifolius is a Chinese species of flowering plants in the family Asteraceae. It grows on rocky slopes, and forest margins at high elevations in Tibet and Yunnan in southwestern China.

Erigeron multifolius is a perennial herb up to 25 cm (10 inches) tall, forming a thick underground rhizomes. Its flower heads have white, pale pink, or pale purple ray florets surrounding yellow disc florets.
