= Erigeron anchana =

Conservation status
- Imperiled (NatureServe)

Scientific classification
- Kingdom: Plantae
- Clade: Tracheophytes
- Clade: Angiosperms
- Clade: Eudicots
- Clade: Asterids
- Order: Asterales
- Family: Asteraceae
- Genus: Erigeron
- Species: E. anchana

Binomial name
- Erigeron anchana G.L.Nesom

Species of flowering plant

Erigeron anchana, the Sierra Ancha fleabane, is a rare Arizona species of flowering plant in the family Asteraceae. It has been found only on cliff faces and in rocky areas in central Arizona. The name "anchana" refers to a mountain range called Sierra Ancha in Gila County, Arizona.

Erigeron anchana is a short perennial rarely more than 22 cm (9 inches) tall. The inflorescence generally consists of 1 - 3 flower heads, each head with a ring of 14–36 white ray florets surrounding a disc of yellow disc florets.
