= Erigeron sparsifolius =

Scientific classification
- Kingdom: Plantae
- Clade: Tracheophytes
- Clade: Angiosperms
- Clade: Eudicots
- Clade: Asterids
- Order: Asterales
- Family: Asteraceae
- Genus: Erigeron
- Species: E. sparsifolius

Binomial name
- Erigeron sparsifolius Eastw.

Synonyms
- Erigeron utahensis var. sparsifolius (Eastw.) Cronquist

Species of flowering plant

Erigeron sparsifolius is a North American species of flowering plant in the family Asteraceae known by the common name bracted Utah fleabane.. It has been found in the southwestern United States, in the states of Arizona, Colorado, and Utah.

Erigeron sparsifolius grows on sandy soil on riverbanks and canyon bottoms. It is a perennial herb up to 55 cm (22 inches) tall. The inflorescence generally contains 1-10 flower heads per stem. Each head contains 10–20 white or blue ray florets surrounding many yellow disc florets.
