= Erigeron krylovii =

Scientific classification
- Kingdom: Plantae
- Clade: Tracheophytes
- Clade: Angiosperms
- Clade: Eudicots
- Clade: Asterids
- Order: Asterales
- Family: Asteraceae
- Genus: Erigeron
- Species: E. krylovii

Binomial name
- Erigeron krylovii Serg.

Species of flowering plant

Erigeron krylovii is an Asian species of flowering plants in the family Asteraceae. It grows in grasslands and in alpine meadows in Siberia, Xinjiang, and Kazakhstan.

Erigeron krylovii is a perennial, clump-forming herb up to 60 cm (5 feet) tall, forming woody rhizomes and a branching underground caudex. Its flower heads have pink, thread-like ray florets surrounding yellow disc florets.
