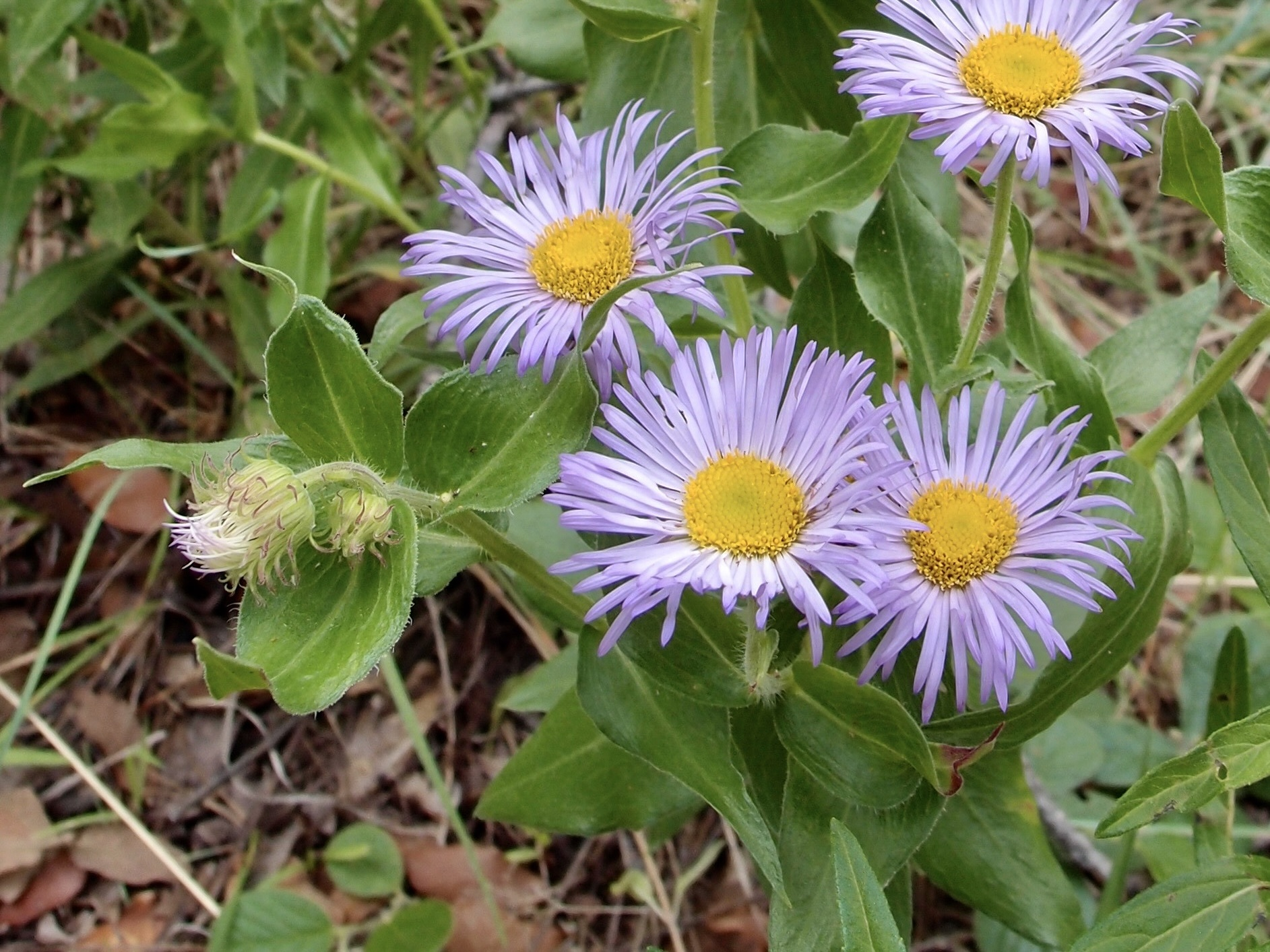

Conservation status
- Apparently Secure (NatureServe)

Scientific classification
- Kingdom: Plantae
- Clade: Tracheophytes
- Clade: Angiosperms
- Clade: Eudicots
- Clade: Asterids
- Order: Asterales
- Family: Asteraceae
- Genus: Erigeron
- Species: E. vreelandii

Binomial name
- Erigeron vreelandii Rydb.

Synonyms
- Erigeron foliosissimus Greene; Erigeron platyphyllus Greene; Erigeron semirasus Wooton & Standl.

= Erigeron vreelandii =

Species of flowering plant

Erigeron vreelandii is a North American species of flowering plant in the family Asteraceae known by the common names sticky tall fleabane and Vreeland's erigeron. It grows in northwestern Mexico (state of Sonora) and in the southwestern United States (Arizona, New Mexico, Colorado).

Erigeron vreelandii grows on rocky slopes in open areas in forests or woodlands dominated by pine, oak, or fir. It is a perennial herb up to 80 centimeters (32 inches) tall, producing a rhizomes and a branching woody caudex. It generally produces 1-22 flower heads per stem. Each head contains 75–150 blue or lavender ray florets, surrounding numerous yellow disc florets.
