= Erigeron purpurascens =

Scientific classification
- Kingdom: Plantae
- Clade: Tracheophytes
- Clade: Angiosperms
- Clade: Eudicots
- Clade: Asterids
- Order: Asterales
- Family: Asteraceae
- Genus: Erigeron
- Species: E. purpurascens

Binomial name
- Erigeron purpurascens Y.Ling & Y.L.Chen

Species of flowering plant

Erigeron purpurascens is a Chinese species of flowering plants in the family Asteraceae. It grows on mountainsides in the province of Sichuan in southwestern China.

Erigeron purpurascens is a tiny, clump-forming perennial herb rarely more than 7 cm (2.8 inches) tall, forming a woody rhizomes. Its flower heads have purple ray florets surrounding yellow disc florets.
