= Erigeron taipeiensis =

Scientific classification
- Kingdom: Plantae
- Clade: Tracheophytes
- Clade: Angiosperms
- Clade: Eudicots
- Clade: Asterids
- Order: Asterales
- Family: Asteraceae
- Genus: Erigeron
- Species: E. taipeiensis

Binomial name
- Erigeron taipeiensis Y.Ling & Y.L.Chen

Species of flowering plant

Erigeron taipeiensis is a Chinese species of flowering plant in the family Asteraceae. It grows in subalpine meadows in the Taibai Mountains Shaanxi province.

Erigeron taipeiensis is a perennial, clumping-forming herb up to 35 cm (14 inches) tall. Its flower heads have lilac ray florets surrounding yellow disc florets.
