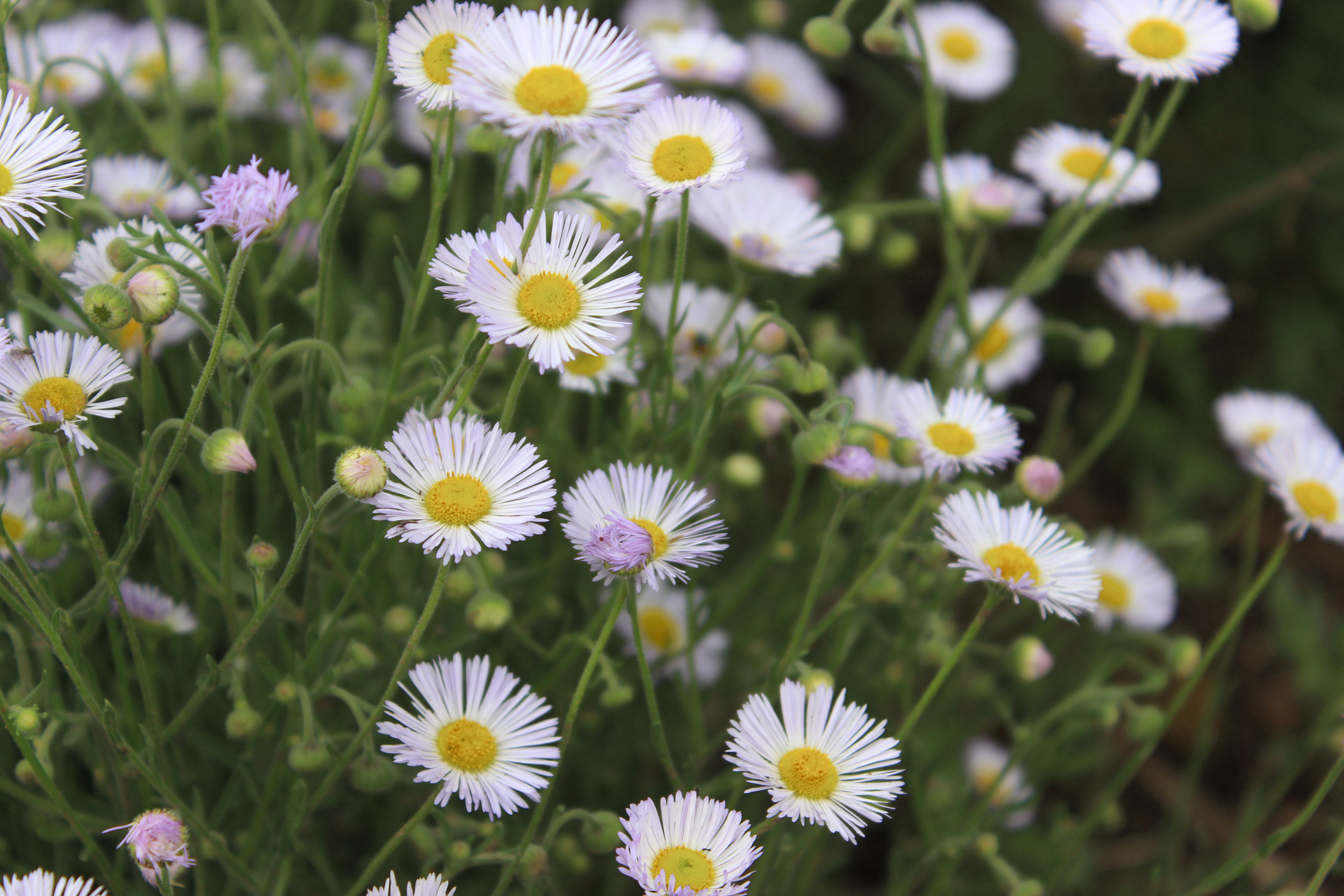
- In Sunset Crater Volcano National Monument, Arizona

Scientific classification
- Kingdom: Plantae
- Clade: Tracheophytes
- Clade: Angiosperms
- Clade: Eudicots
- Clade: Asterids
- Order: Asterales
- Family: Asteraceae
- Genus: Erigeron
- Species: E. oreophilus

Binomial name
- Erigeron oreophilus Greenm.

Synonyms
- Achaetogeron pringlei Larsen; Erigeron delphinifolius var. oreophilus (Greenm.) Cronquist

= Erigeron oreophilus =

Species of flowering plant

Erigeron oreophilus is a North American species of flowering plant in the family Asteraceae, called the chaparral fleabane. It is native to northern Mexico (Chihuahua, Durango, Sonora) and the southwestern United States (Arizona, New Mexico).

Erigeron oreophilus is a perennial herb up to 90 centimeters (3 feet) tall, with a large taproot. Leaves are pinnatifid with long narrow lobes. The plant generally produces an array of numerous flower heads per stem, each head with up to 75–130 white ray florets surrounding numerous yellow disc florets. The species grows in rocky, open locations in grasslands and conifer woodlands.
