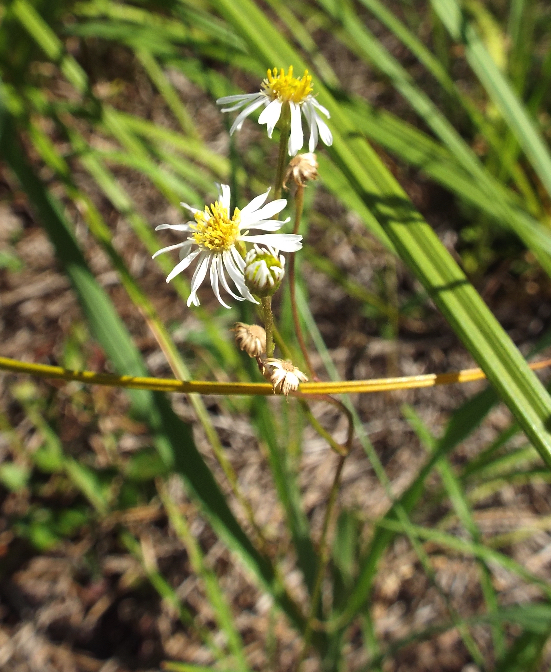

Scientific classification
- Kingdom: Plantae
- Clade: Tracheophytes
- Clade: Angiosperms
- Clade: Eudicots
- Clade: Asterids
- Order: Asterales
- Family: Asteraceae
- Genus: Erigeron
- Species: E. vernus

Binomial name
- Erigeron vernus S.L.Welsh & Goodrich 1983

Synonyms
- Synonymy: Erigeron vernum (L.) Torr. & A.Gray; Aster vernus L.; Doronicum laevifolium Walter; Erigeron integrifolius Bertol.; Fragmosa nudicaulis (Michx.) Raf. ex B.D.Jacks.; Stenactis verna (L.) Nees

= Erigeron vernus =

Species of flowering plant

Erigeron vernus is a North American species of flowering plant in the family Asteraceae known by the common name early white-top fleabane. It is native to the southeastern United States from Virginia to Louisiana. It is found most commonly in habitat types such as interdunal swales, wet savannas, cypress swamps, among others. It acts as an indicator species in the savannas of the Florida Panhandle.

Erigeron vernus grows in moist locations in flatwoods and savannahs, and sometimes in ditches and by roadsides. It is a biennial or perennial herb up to 50 centimeters (20 inches) tall, producing rhizomes and a woody underground caudex. The inflorescence is made up of 1–25 flower heads in flat-topped arrays. Each head contains 25–40 white ray florets surrounding numerous yellow disc florets.
