= Erigeron irazuense =

Scientific classification
- Kingdom: Plantae
- Clade: Tracheophytes
- Clade: Angiosperms
- Clade: Eudicots
- Clade: Asterids
- Order: Asterales
- Family: Asteraceae
- Genus: Erigeron
- Species: E. irazuense

Binomial name
- Erigeron irazuense Greenm.

Synonyms
- Erigeron irazuensis Greenm.

Species of flowering plant

Erigeron irazuense is a Central American species of flowering plant in the family Asteraceae. It has been found only in Costa Rica.

Erigeron irazuense is a perennial herb up to 25 cm (10 inches) tall, producing a branching underground caudex. Stems are sometimes erect (standing straight up) but other times recumbent (reclining on the ground or leaning on other vegetation). Leaves are moderately hairy, some produced close to the ground plus others higher on the stem. The plant produces flower heads on long, thin stalks. Each head contains 38-55 white or pink ray florets surrounding numerous yellow disc florets.
