= Erigeron lemmonii =

Conservation status
- Critically Imperiled (NatureServe)

Scientific classification
- Kingdom: Plantae
- Clade: Tracheophytes
- Clade: Angiosperms
- Clade: Eudicots
- Clade: Asterids
- Order: Asterales
- Family: Asteraceae
- Genus: Erigeron
- Species: E. lemmonii

Binomial name
- Erigeron lemmonii A.Gray

Species of flowering plant

Erigeron lemmonii is a rare species of flowering plant in the family Asteraceae known by the common name Lemmon's fleabane. It has been found only in Scheelite Canyon on the grounds of Fort Huachuca Military Reservation in Cochise County, Arizona.

Erigeron lemmonii is a branching perennial herb up to 60 centimeters (2 feet) tall, producing a woody taproot. The leaves and the stem are covered with hairs. The plant generally produces only 1-3 flower heads per stem, each head with up to 60 white ray florets surrounding numerous yellow disc florets. The species grows shaded cliff-faces in pine-oak forest.

The species is named for John Gill Lemmon (1831 - 1908), husband of prominent American botanist Sarah Plummer Lemmon (1836 – 1923).
