= Erigeron alpicola =

- Erigeron alpicola var. angustifolius

Scientific classification
- Kingdom: Plantae
- Clade: Tracheophytes
- Clade: Angiosperms
- Clade: Eudicots
- Clade: Asterids
- Order: Asterales
- Family: Asteraceae
- Genus: Erigeron
- Species: E. alpicola

Binomial name
- Erigeron alpicola Makino

Synonyms
- Erigeron alpicolus Makino 1914; Erigeron dubius var. alpicolus Makino 1906

Species of flowering plant

Erigeron alpicola is an Asian species of flowering plants in the family Asteraceae. It is native to Japan, Kamchatka Krai, Khabarovsk Krai, Korea, the Kuril Islands, Magadan Oblast, Manchuria, Sakhalin, and Sakha Republic.

Erigeron alpicola is a perennial, clump-forming herb up to 28 cm (11.2 inches) tall. Its flower heads have lilac ray florets and yellow disc florets.

== Varieties ==
The species includes the following varieties:

- Erigeron alpicola var. alpicola
- Erigeron alpicola var. angustifolius (Tatew.) Kadota
- Erigeron alpicola var. haruoi (Toyok.) Kadota
- Erigeron alpicola var. heterotrichus (H.Hara) Kadota
- Erigeron alpicola var. kirigishiensis (Inagaki & Toyok.) Kadota
- Erigeron alpicola var. riparius Kadota
- Erigeron alpicola var. schikotanensis (Barkalov) Kadota
