= Erigeron leucoglossus =

Scientific classification
- Kingdom: Plantae
- Clade: Tracheophytes
- Clade: Angiosperms
- Clade: Eudicots
- Clade: Asterids
- Order: Asterales
- Family: Asteraceae
- Genus: Erigeron
- Species: E. leucoglossus

Binomial name
- Erigeron leucoglossus Y.Ling & Y.L.Chen

Species of flowering plant

Erigeron leucoglossus is an Asian species of flowering plants in the family Asteraceae. It grows in alpine grasslands in Tibet.

Erigeron leucoglossus is a perennial, clump-forming herb up to 35 cm (14 inches) tall, forming woody underground rhizomes. Its flower heads have white ray florets surrounding yellow disc florets.
