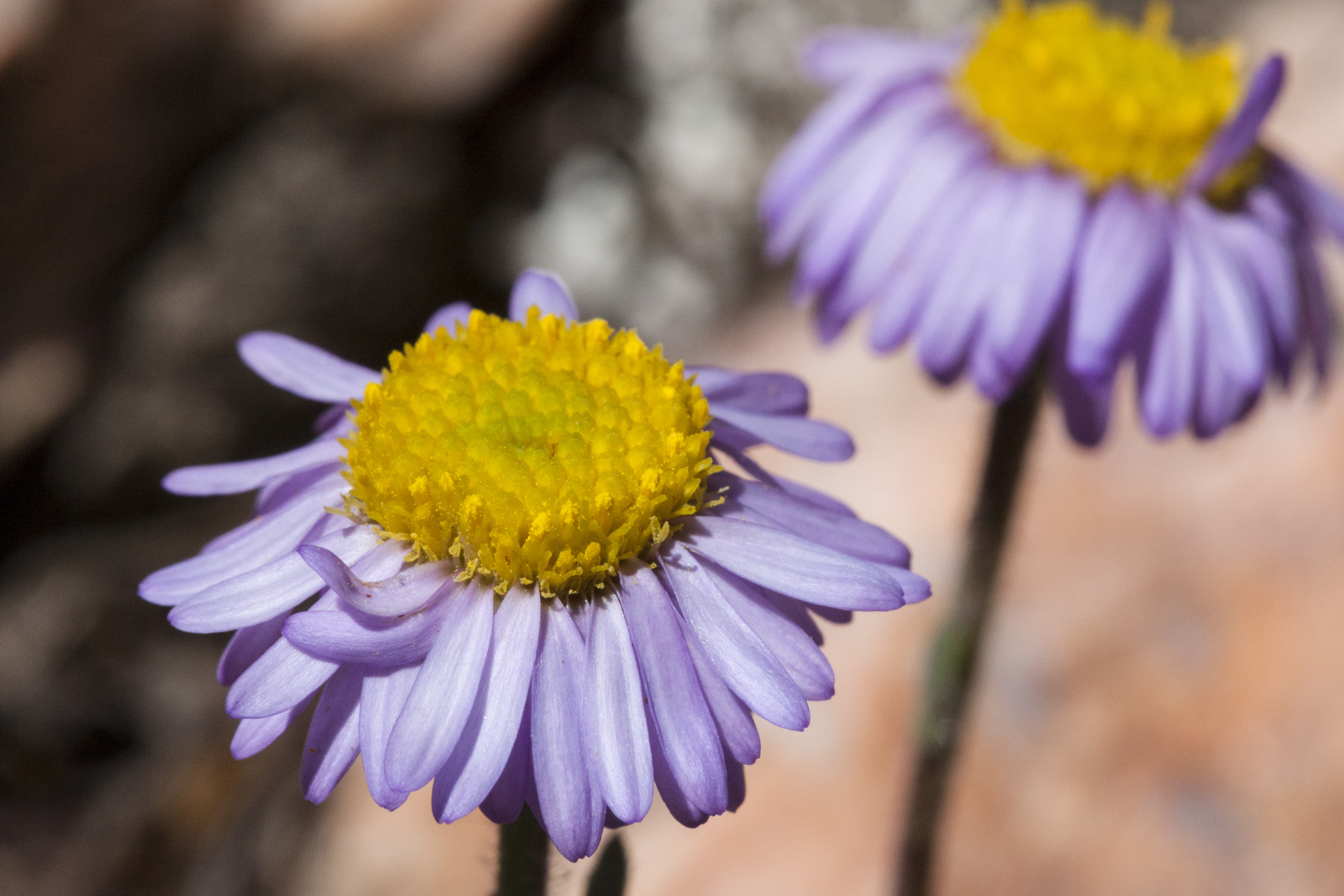

Conservation status
- Apparently Secure (NatureServe)

Scientific classification
- Kingdom: Plantae
- Clade: Tracheophytes
- Clade: Angiosperms
- Clade: Eudicots
- Clade: Asterids
- Order: Asterales
- Family: Asteraceae
- Genus: Erigeron
- Species: E. vetensis

Binomial name
- Erigeron vetensis Rydb.

Synonyms
- Erigeron glandulosus Porter; Erigeron porteri S.F.Blake

= Erigeron vetensis =

Species of flowering plant

Erigeron vetensis is a North American species of flowering plant in the family Asteraceae known by the common name early blue-top fleabane. It is native to the western United States (primarily in the Rocky Mountains of Wyoming, Colorado, and New Mexico but with an isolated population in Nebraska).

Erigeron vetensis grows in dry, open sites in openings in conifer forests. It is a perennial herb up to 50 centimeters (20 inches) tall. It generally produces only one flower head per stem. Each head contains 30–90; blue, purple, or white ray florets surrounding numerous yellow disc florets.
