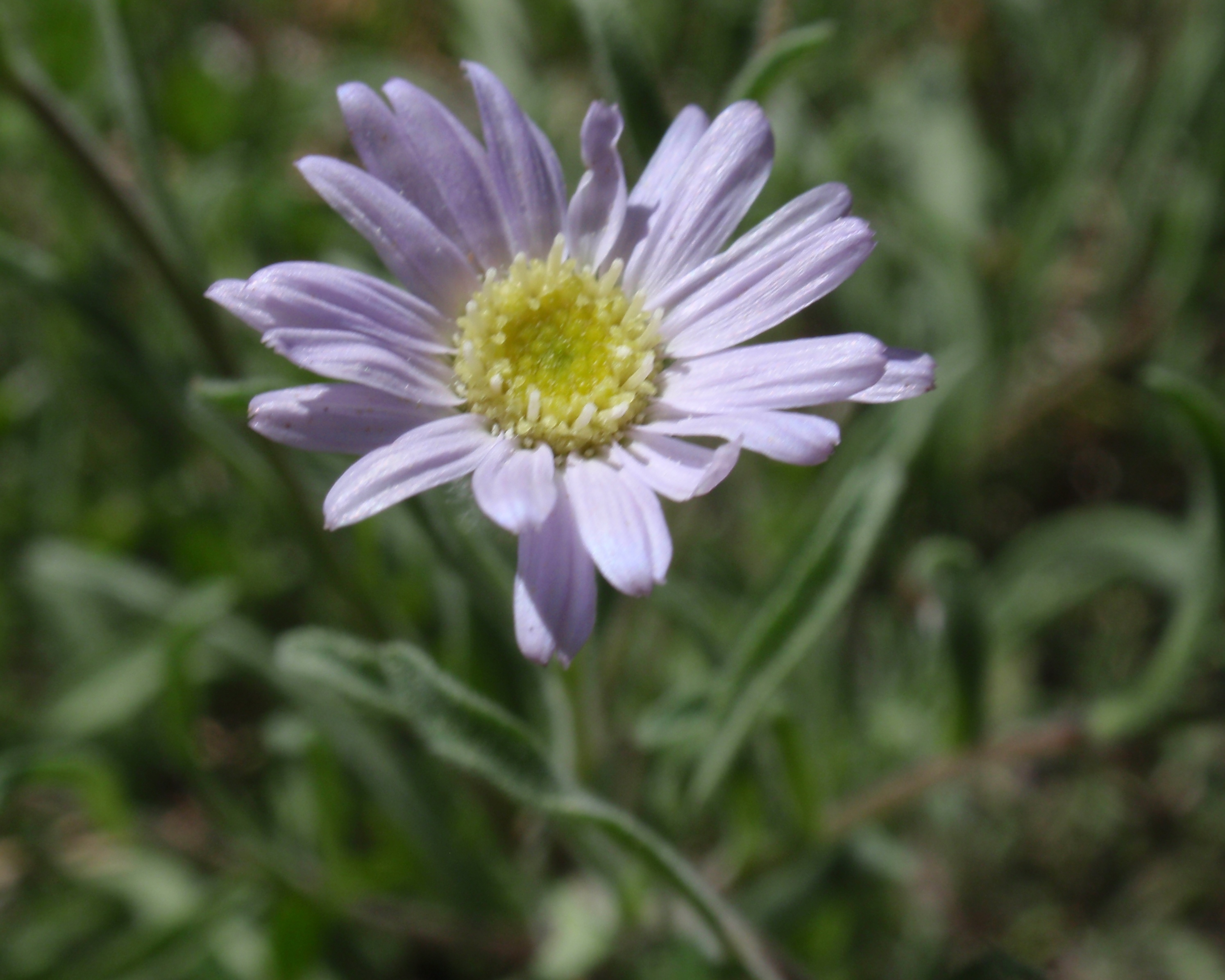

Scientific classification
- Kingdom: Plantae
- Clade: Tracheophytes
- Clade: Angiosperms
- Clade: Eudicots
- Clade: Asterids
- Order: Asterales
- Family: Asteraceae
- Genus: Erigeron
- Species: E. barbellulatus

Binomial name
- Erigeron barbellulatus Greene

= Erigeron barbellulatus =

Species of flowering plant

Erigeron barbellulatus, commonly known as shining fleabane, is a species of fleabane in the family Asteraceae.

== Distribution ==
The small plant is endemic to northeastern California, in the Sierra Nevada, from Lassen County south to Tulare County. It is found on gravelly and rocky slopes, at elevations of 2,100–3,300 metres (6,900–10,800 ft), from sagebrush/pine to Sierra Nevada subalpine zone forest habitats.

== Description ==
Erigeron barbellulatus is a small perennial herb up to 15 cm (6 inches) tall.

One plant usually produces only one flower head, with 15–35 white, lavender, or blue ray florets surrounding numerous small disc florets.
