= Erigeron gracilis =

Scientific classification
- Kingdom: Plantae
- Clade: Tracheophytes
- Clade: Angiosperms
- Clade: Eudicots
- Clade: Asterids
- Order: Asterales
- Family: Asteraceae
- Genus: Erigeron
- Species: E. gracilis

Binomial name
- Erigeron gracilis Rydb.

Species of flowering plant

Erigeron gracilis is a North American species of flowering plant in the family Asteraceae known by the common name quill fleabane.

Erigeron gracilis is native to the Rocky Mountains of the United States, in the states of Idaho, Montana, and Wyoming. Some of the known populations lie inside Yellowstone National Park.

Erigeron gracilis is a perennial herb up to 20 cm (20 inches) tall, spreading by means of underground rhizomes. The plant generally produces only one flower heads per stem. Each head contains as many as 10 blue or purple ray florets surrounding numerous yellow disc florets.
