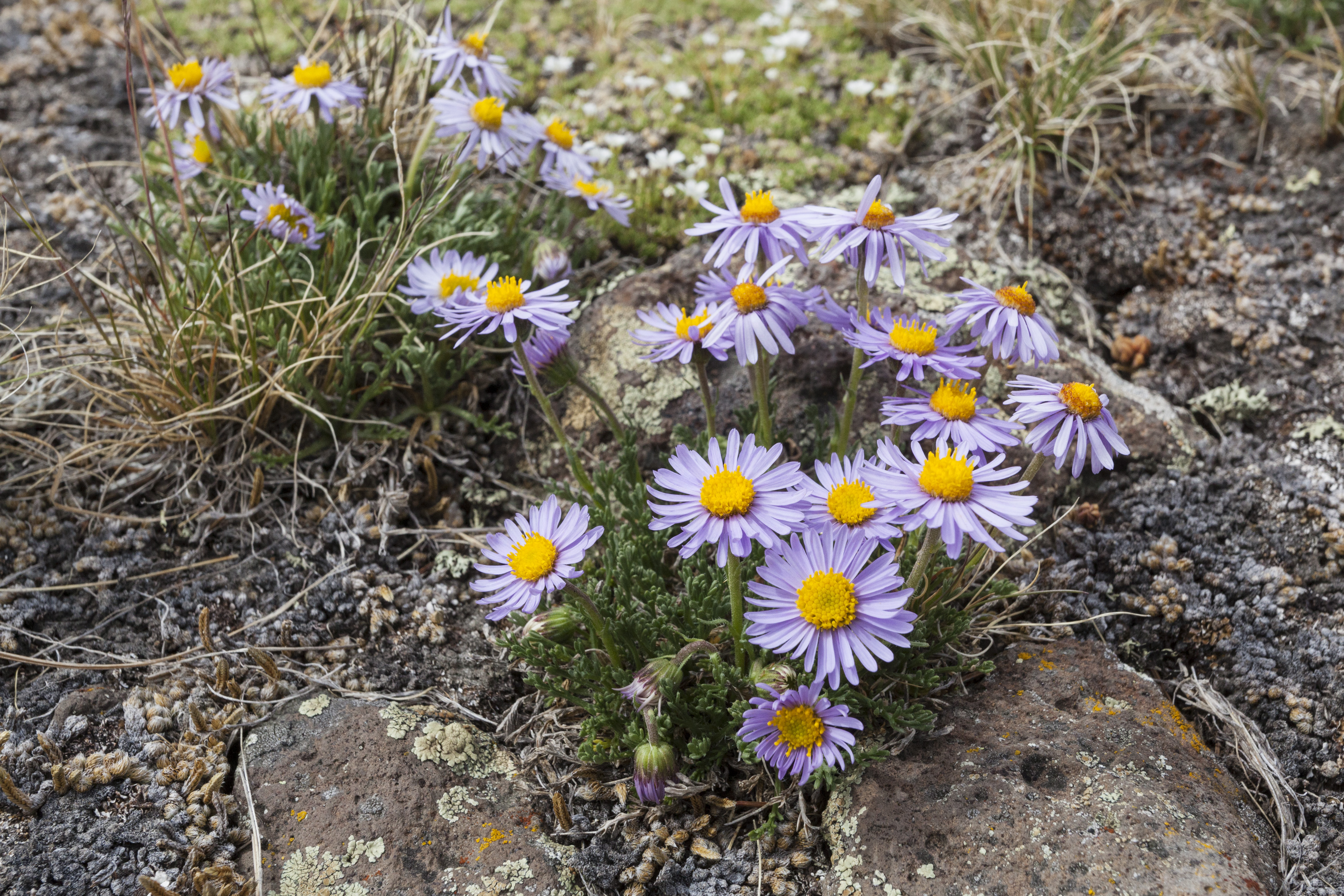

Conservation status
- Apparently Secure (NatureServe)

Scientific classification
- Kingdom: Plantae
- Clade: Tracheophytes
- Clade: Angiosperms
- Clade: Eudicots
- Clade: Asterids
- Order: Asterales
- Family: Asteraceae
- Genus: Erigeron
- Species: E. pinnatisectus

Binomial name
- Erigeron pinnatisectus (A.Gray) A.Nelson

Synonyms
- Erigeron compositus var. pinnatisectus A.Gray

= Erigeron pinnatisectus =

Species of flowering plant

Erigeron pinnatisectus is a species of flowering plant in the family Asteraceae known by the common name feather-leaf fleabane. It is native to the Rocky Mountains of Wyoming, Colorado, and New Mexico.

Erigeron pinnatisectus is a small perennial herb rarely more than 11 centimeters (4.4 inches) tall, producing a woody taproot. The leaves are covered with wool. The plant generally produces only 1 flower head per stem. Each head has 40–70 purple or pale blue ray florets surrounding numerous yellow disc florets. The plant grows on buffs, ledges, and steep slopes at high altitudes, often above tree line.
