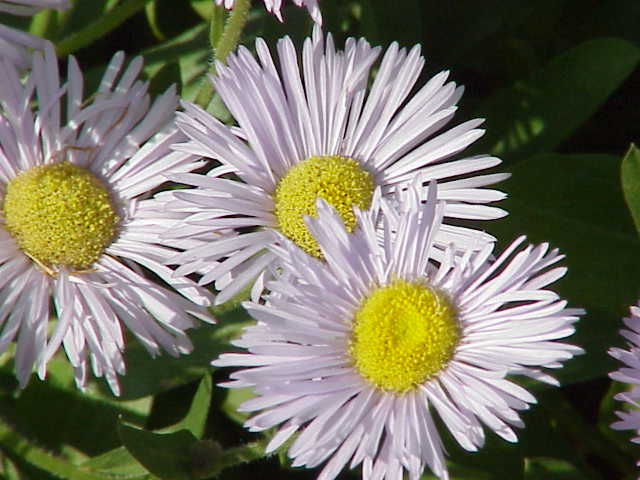

Scientific classification
- Kingdom: Plantae
- Clade: Tracheophytes
- Clade: Angiosperms
- Clade: Eudicots
- Clade: Asterids
- Order: Asterales
- Family: Asteraceae
- Genus: Erigeron
- Species: E. aurantiacus

Binomial name
- Erigeron aurantiacus Regel

= Erigeron aurantiacus =

Species of flowering plant

Erigeron aurantiacus is an Asian species of flowering plants in the family Asteraceae. It is native to Kazakhstan and Xinjiang in central Asia.

Erigeron aurantiacus is a perennial, clump-forming herb up to 35 cm (14 inches) tall. Its flower heads have orange, yellow, or deep red ray florets and yellow disc florets.
