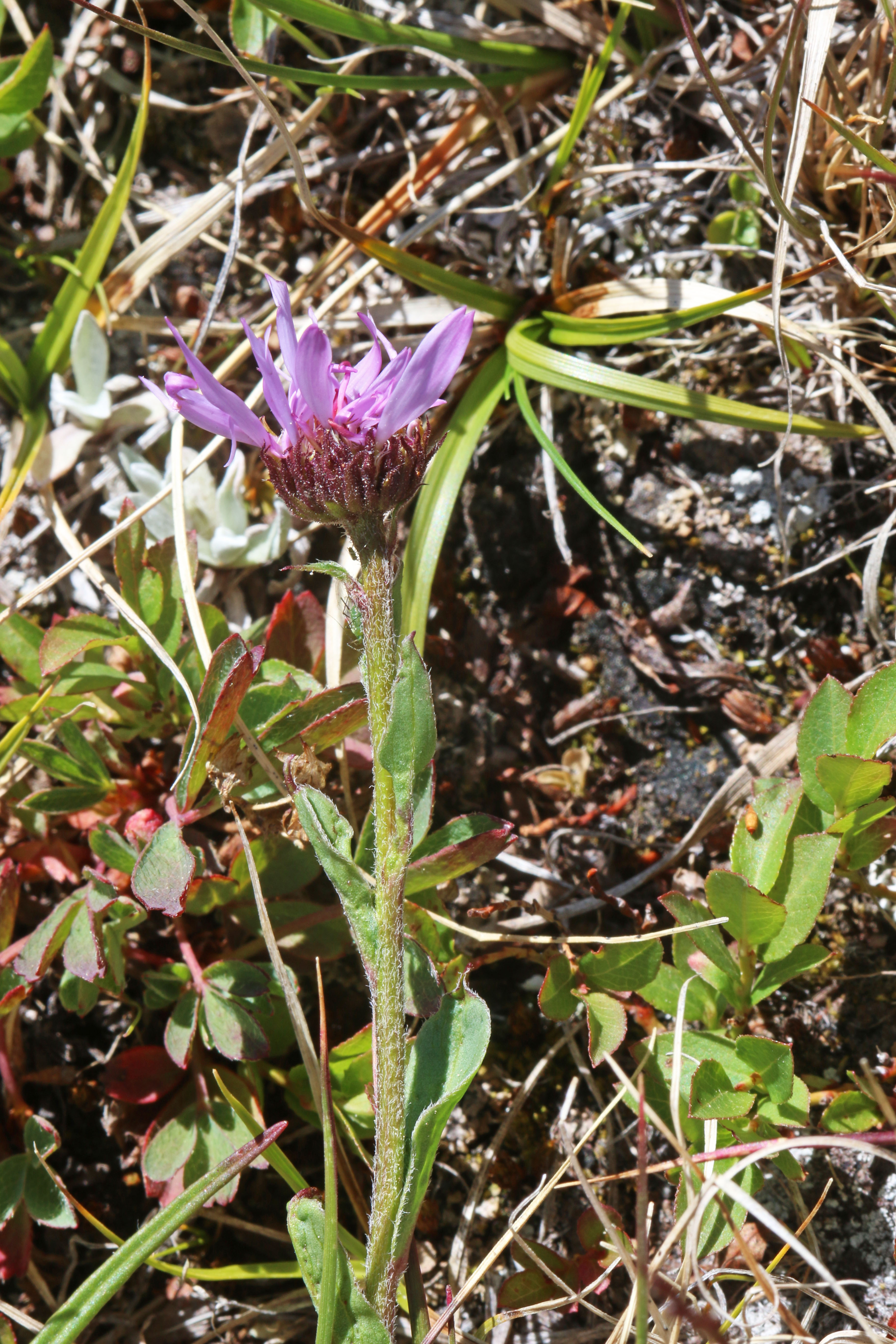

Conservation status
- Vulnerable (NatureServe)

Scientific classification
- Kingdom: Plantae
- Clade: Tracheophytes
- Clade: Angiosperms
- Clade: Eudicots
- Clade: Asterids
- Order: Asterales
- Family: Asteraceae
- Genus: Erigeron
- Species: E. uintahensis

Binomial name
- Erigeron uintahensis Cronquist

= Erigeron uintahensis =

Species of flowering plant

Erigeron uintahensis is a North American species of flowering plant in the family Asteraceae known by the common name Uinta fleabane. It is native to the western United States, in the states of Idaho, Wyoming, Utah, and Colorado.

Erigeron uintahensis grows alongside sagebrush, pine, aspen, spruce and fir, and also on alpine meadows at high elevation. It is a perennial herb up to 50 centimeters (20 inches) tall, producing rhizomes and a woody underground caudex. The inflorescence is made up of 1-5 flower heads per stem, in a loose array. Each head contains 75–125 blue or lavender ray florets surrounding numerous yellow disc florets.
