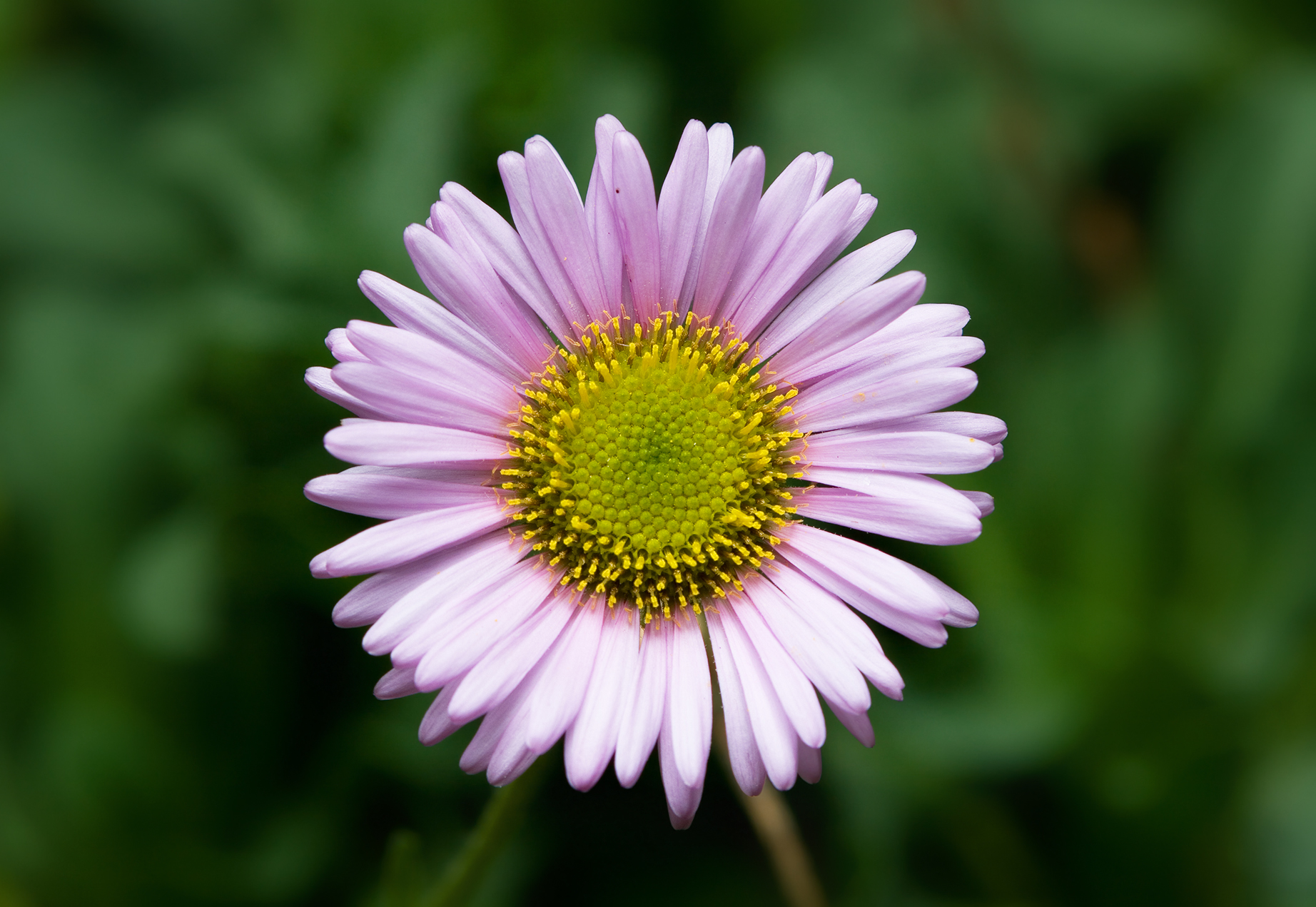
- Erigeron glaucus, seaside daisy

Scientific classification
- Kingdom: Plantae
- Clade: Tracheophytes
- Clade: Angiosperms
- Clade: Eudicots
- Clade: Asterids
- Order: Asterales
- Family: Asteraceae
- Subfamily: Asteroideae
- Tribe: Astereae
- Subtribe: Conyzinae
- Genus: Erigeron; L.

Diversity
- Around 460 species

Synonyms
- Synonymy: Astradelphus J.Rémy; Polyactis Less.; Dimorphanthes Cass.; Fragmosa Raf.; Woodvillea DC.; Stenactis Cass.; Terranea Colla; Conyzoides Fabr.; Trimorpha Cass.; Eschenbachia Moench; Brachyactis Ledeb.; Musteron Raf.; Heterochaeta DC. 1836, illegitimate homonym not Besser 1827 (Poaceae); Polyactidium DC.; Wyomingia A.Nelson; Fimbrillaria Cass.; Trimorphaea Cass.; Phalacroloma Cass.; Asterigeron Rydb.; Achaetogeron A.Gray; Gusmania J.Rémy; Diplemium Raf.

= Erigeron =

Fleabane

Genus of flowering plants

Erigeron (/ɪˈrɪdʒərɒn/) is a large genus of plants in the composite family (Asteraceae). It is placed in the tribe Astereae and is closely related to the Old World asters (Aster) and the true daisies (Bellis). The genus has a cosmopolitan distribution, and the highest diversity occurs in North America.

== Etymology ==
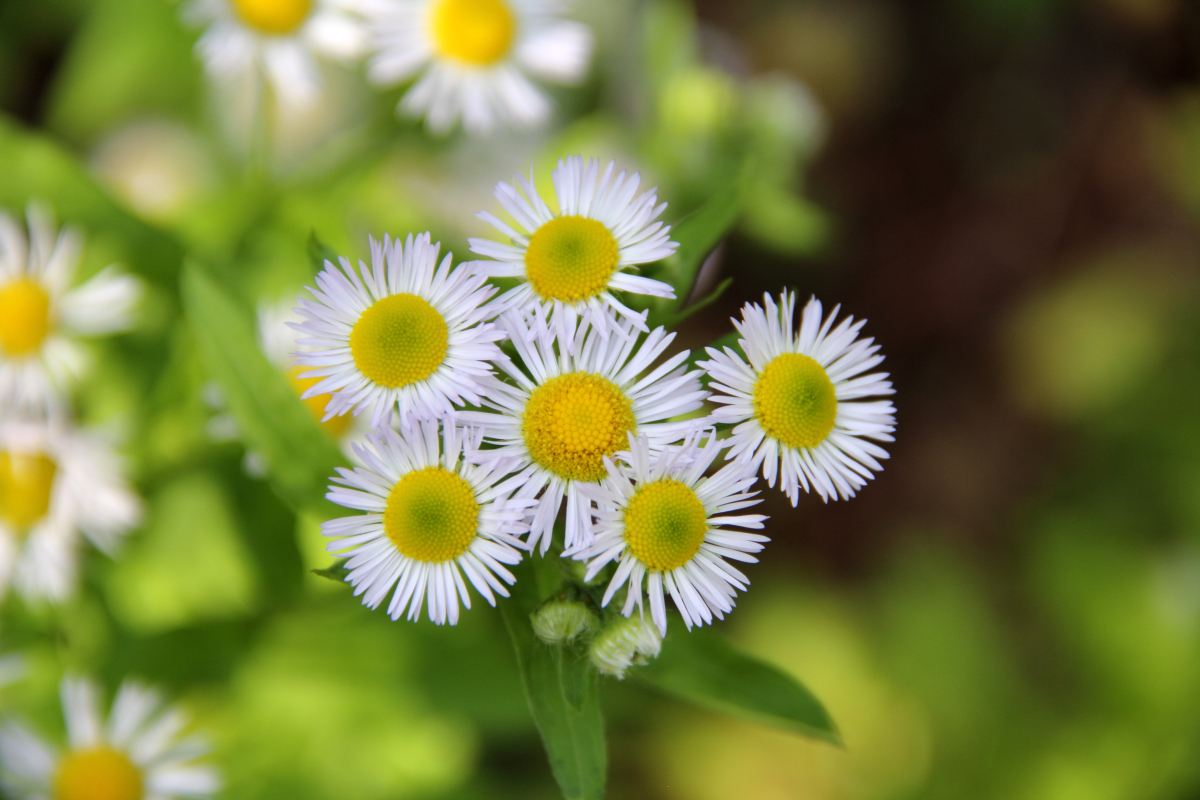
Erigeron annuus

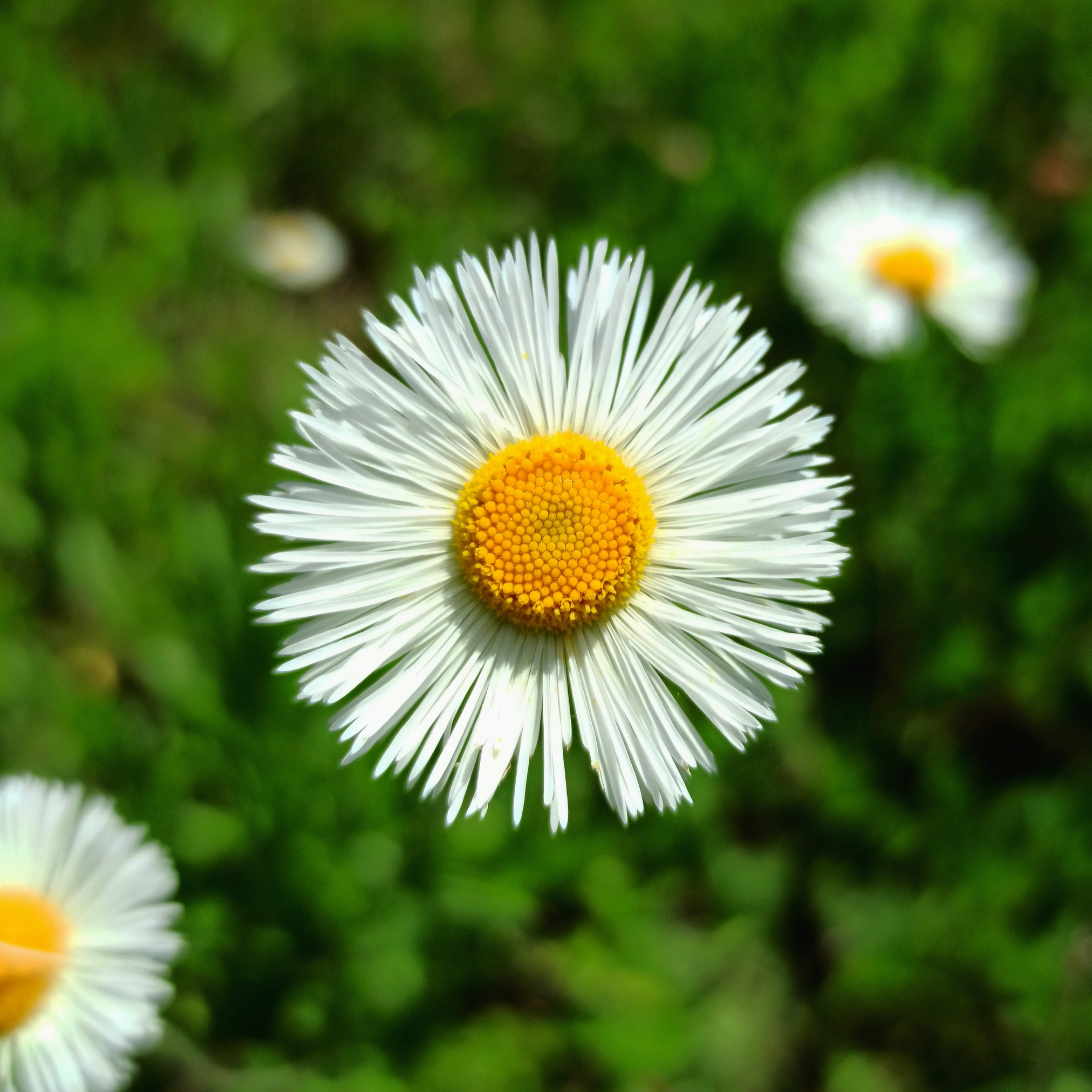
Erigeron longipes

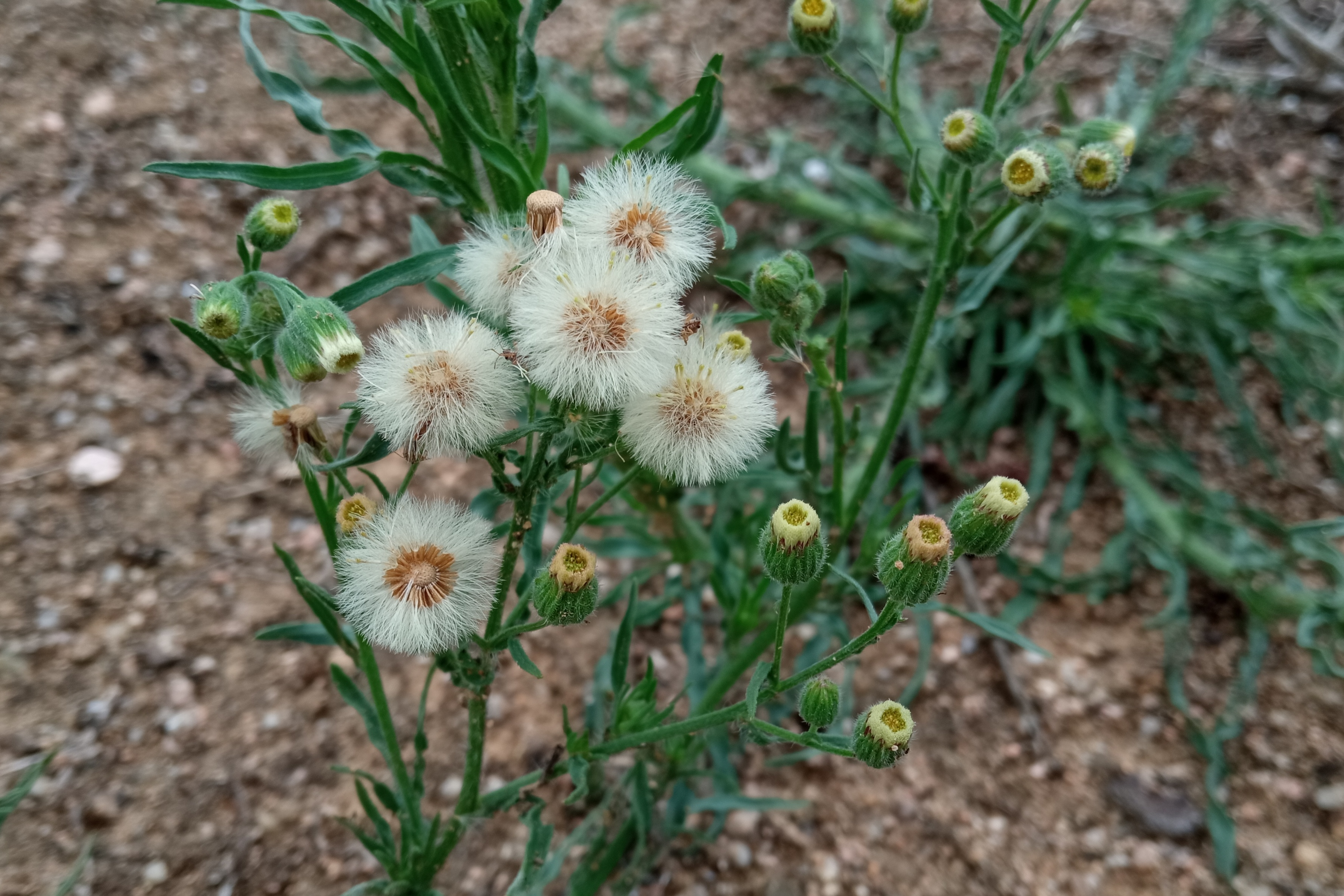
Erigeron bonariensis

Its English name, fleabane, is shared with related plants in several other genera. It appears to be derived from a belief that the dried plants repelled fleas or that the plants were poisonous to fleas. Botanist Thomas Meehan, though, calls "fleabane" a misnomer for North American species, rarely used in the United States "until it was employed in botanical works".

The generic name Erigeron is derived from the Ancient Greek words ἦρι (êri) "early in the morning" and γέρων (gérōn) "old man", a reference to the appearance of the white hairs of the fruit soon after flowering or possibly alluding to the early appearance of the seed heads. The noun γέρων is masculine, so that specific epithets should have masculine endings (e.g. glaucus) to agree with it. However, authors have incorrectly used neuter endings (e.g. glaucum), because the ending -on resembles the ending of Ancient Greek neuter second declension nouns, as Augustin Pyramus de Candolle did in his 1836 account of the genus.

== Description ==
The species may be annuals, biennials, or perennials. They are well-branched with erect stems, characterized by their numerous white, lavender, or pink ray flowers and yellow disc flowers. Some members of this group have no ray flowers. The pappus (=modified calyx, forming a crown) is shorter than in Aster and consists of bristles. The ray florets are narrower than in Aster but are longer than the involucre (=whorled bracts).

== Cultivation ==
Many species are used as ornamental plants, with numerous named cultivars such as 'Wayne Roderick', 'Charity', 'Foersters Liebling', and 'Dunkelste aller' ("The darkest of all" with semi-double, deep-violet flower heads).

== Ecology ==
Erigeron species are used as food plants by the larvae of some Lepidoptera species including Bucculatrix angustata, Coleophora squamosella (which feeds exclusively on E. acris), Schinia intermontana, Schinia obscurata (both of which also feed exclusively on Erigeron), Schinia sexata (which feeds exclusively on E. glabellus) and Schinia villosa. Above-ground biomass of Erigeron in montane meadows decreases with decreased water availability/increased temperatures.

== Selected species ==
As of 2020 Royal Botanic Gardens, Kew's Plants of the World Online lists around 460 species of plants in the genus Erigeron. Selected species include:

- Erigeron abajoensis – Abajo fleabane
- Erigeron acomanus – Bluewater fleabane
- Erigeron aequifolius – Hall's fleabane, Hall's daisy
- Erigeron algidus – stalked fleabane
- Erigeron aliceae – Alice Eastwood's fleabane
- Erigeron allocotus – Big Horn fleabane
- Erigeron alpinus – alpine erigeron
- Erigeron anchana – Sierra Ancha fleabane
- Erigeron angustatus – Greene's narrow-leaved daisy
- Erigeron annuus – eastern daisy fleabane
- Erigeron aphanactis – rayless shaggy fleabane
- Erigeron arenarioides – sand fleabane
- Erigeron argentatus – silver fleabane
- Erigeron arisolius – Arid Throne fleabane
- Erigeron arizonicus – Arizona fleabane
- Erigeron asperugineus – Idaho fleabane
- Erigeron atticus - Greek fleabane
- Erigeron aurantiacus – orange daisy
- Erigeron aureus – alpine yellow fleabane
- Erigeron barbellulatus – shining fleabane
- Erigeron basalticus – basalt fleabane
- Erigeron bellidiastrum – western daisy fleabane
- Erigeron bigelovii – Bigelow's fleabane
- Erigeron biolettii – Biolett's erigeron
- Erigeron blochmaniae – Blochman's erigeron
- Erigeron bloomeri – Scabland fleabane
- Erigeron bonariensis - horseweed
- Erigeron breviscapus – life flower
- Erigeron breweri – Brewer's fleabane
- Erigeron caespitosus – tufted fleabane
- Erigeron canadensis – Canadian horseweed
- Erigeron canus – hoary fleabane
- Erigeron cascadensis – Cascade fleabane
- Erigeron cervinus – Siskiyou fleabane
- Erigeron chrysopsidis – golden daisy/fleabane
- Erigeron clokeyi – Clokey's fleabane
- Erigeron compactus – fern-leaf fleabane
- Erigeron compositus – cut-leaf fleabane
- Erigeron concinnus – Navajo fleabane
- Erigeron consimilis – foothill fleabane
- Erigeron coulteri – large mountain fleabane
- Erigeron cronquistii – Cronquist's fleabane
- Erigeron cuneifolius – wedge-leaf fleabane
- Erigeron darrellianus – Darrell's fleabane
- Erigeron decumbens – Willamette fleabane
- Erigeron disparipilus – white cushion fleabane
- Erigeron divergens – spreading fleabane
- Erigeron eatonii – Eaton's fleabane
- Erigeron elatior – tall fleabane
- Erigeron elegantulus – blue dwarf fleabane
- Erigeron engelmannii – Engelmann's fleabane
- Erigeron evermannii – Evermann's fleabane
- Erigeron eximius – spruce-fir fleabane
- Erigeron filifolius – thread-leaf fleabane
- Erigeron flabellifolius – fan-leaf fleabane
- Erigeron flagellaris – trailing fleabane
- Erigeron flettii – Flett's fleabane
- Erigeron foliosus – leafy fleabane
- Erigeron formosissimus – beautiful fleabane
- Erigeron garrettii – Garrett's fleabane
- Erigeron geiseri – Geiser's fleabane
- Erigeron glabellus – streamside fleabane
- Erigeron glaucus – beach aster, beach daisy, seaside daisy
- Erigeron goodrichii – Uinta Mountain fleabane
- Erigeron gracilis – quill fleabane
- Erigeron grandiflorus – large-flower fleabane
- Erigeron heliographis – Heliograph Peak fleabane
- Erigeron hessii – Hess' fleabane
- Erigeron howellii – Howell's fleabane
- Erigeron humilis – arctic-alpine fleabane
- Erigeron hyssopifolius – hyssop-leaf fleabane
- Erigeron inornatus – California rayless fleabane
- Erigeron jamaicensis – Jamaica fleabane
- Erigeron jonesii – Jones' fleabane
- Erigeron kachinensis – Kachina fleabane
- Erigeron karvinskianus – Latin American fleabane
- Erigeron kuschei – Chiricahua fleabane
- Erigeron lanatus – woolly fleabane
- Erigeron lassenianus – Mt. Lassen fleabane
- Erigeron latus – broad fleabane
- Erigeron leibergii – Leiberg's fleabane
- Erigeron leiomerus – rockslide yellow fleabane
- Erigeron lemmonii – Lemmon's fleabane
- Erigeron linearis – desert yellow fleabane
- Erigeron lobatus – lobed fleabane
- Erigeron lonchophyllus – shortray fleabane
- Erigeron maguirei – Maguire's fleabane
- Erigeron mancus – depauperate fleabane
- Erigeron maniopotamicus – Mad River fleabane
- Erigeron melanocephalus – Black-head fleabane
- Erigeron miser – starved fleabane
- Erigeron miyabeanus – Japanese fleabane
- Erigeron modestus – plains fleabane
- Erigeron muirii – Muir's fleabane
- Erigeron multiceps – Kern River fleabane
- Erigeron multiradiatus – Himalayan fleabane
- Erigeron nanus – dwarf fleabane
- Erigeron nauseosus – Marysvale fleabane
- Erigeron nematophyllus – needle-leaf fleabane
- Erigeron neomexicanus – New Mexico fleabane
- Erigeron ochroleucus – buff fleabane
- Erigeron oreganus – gorge fleabane
- Erigeron oreophilus – chaparral fleabane
- Erigeron ovinus – sheep fleabane
- Erigeron oxyphyllus – wand fleabane
- Erigeron parishii – Parish's fleabane
- Erigeron peregrinus – wandering fleabane
- Erigeron petrophilus – cliff fleabane, rock daisy
- Erigeron philadelphicus – Philadelphia fleabane/daisy
- Erigeron pinnatisectus – feather-leaf fleabane
- Erigeron piperianus – Piper's fleabane
- Erigeron piscaticus – Fish Creek fleabane
- Erigeron poliospermus – purple cushion fleabane
- Erigeron pringlei – Pringle's fleabane
- Erigeron procumbens – Corpus Christi fleabane
- Erigeron pubescens – hairy fleabane
- Erigeron pulchellus – Robin's plantain
- Erigeron pulcherrimus – basin fleabane
- Erigeron pumilus – shaggy fleabane
- Erigeron purpuratus – purple fleabane
- Erigeron pygmaeus – pygmy fleabane
- Erigeron quercifolius – oak-leaf fleabane
- Erigeron radicatus – tap-root fleabane
- Erigeron religiosus – Clear Creek fleabane
- Erigeron rhizomatus – Zuni fleabane
- Erigeron roylei – Royle's fleabane
- Erigeron rybius – royal fleabane
- Erigeron rydbergii – Rydberg's fleabane
- Erigeron salishii – Star Peak fleabane
- Erigeron salmonensis – Salmon River fleabane
- Erigeron sanctarum – saints fleabane
- Erigeron saxatilis – rock fleabane
- Erigeron sceptrifer – scepter-bearing fleabane
- Erigeron scopulinus – Winn Falls fleabane
- Erigeron sionis – Zion fleabane
- Erigeron speciosus – aspen fleabane
- Erigeron strigosus – prairie fleabane
- Erigeron subglaber – hairless fleabane
- Erigeron subtrinervis – three-nerve fleabane
- Erigeron sumatrensis – Guernsey fleabane
- Erigeron supplex – supple fleabane
- Erigeron tenellus – Rio Grande fleabane
- Erigeron tener – slender fleabane
- Erigeron tenuis – slender-leaf fleabane
- Erigeron thunbergii – Thunberg's fleabane
- Erigeron tweedyi – Tweedy's fleabane
- Erigeron uintahensis – Uinta fleabane
- Erigeron uncialis – lone fleabane
- Erigeron uniflorus – one-flowered fleabane
- Erigeron untermannii – Indian Canyon fleabane
- Erigeron ursinus – Bear River fleabane
- Erigeron utahensis – Utah fleabane
- Erigeron vagus – rambling fleabane
- Erigeron vernus – early white-top fleabane
- Erigeron versicolor – Sonora fleabane
- Erigeron vetensis – early blue-top fleabane
- Erigeron watsonii – Watson's fleabane
- Erigeron wilkenii – Wilken's fleabane
- Erigeron yukonensis – Yukon fleabane

The following names are not accepted as of 2020 in Royal Botanic Gardens, Kew's Plants of the World Online database:

- Erigeron acer – blue fleabane
- Erigeron corymbosus – long-leaf fleabane
- Erigeron greenei – synonym of Erigeron angustatus
- Erigeron hultenii – Hulten's fleabane
