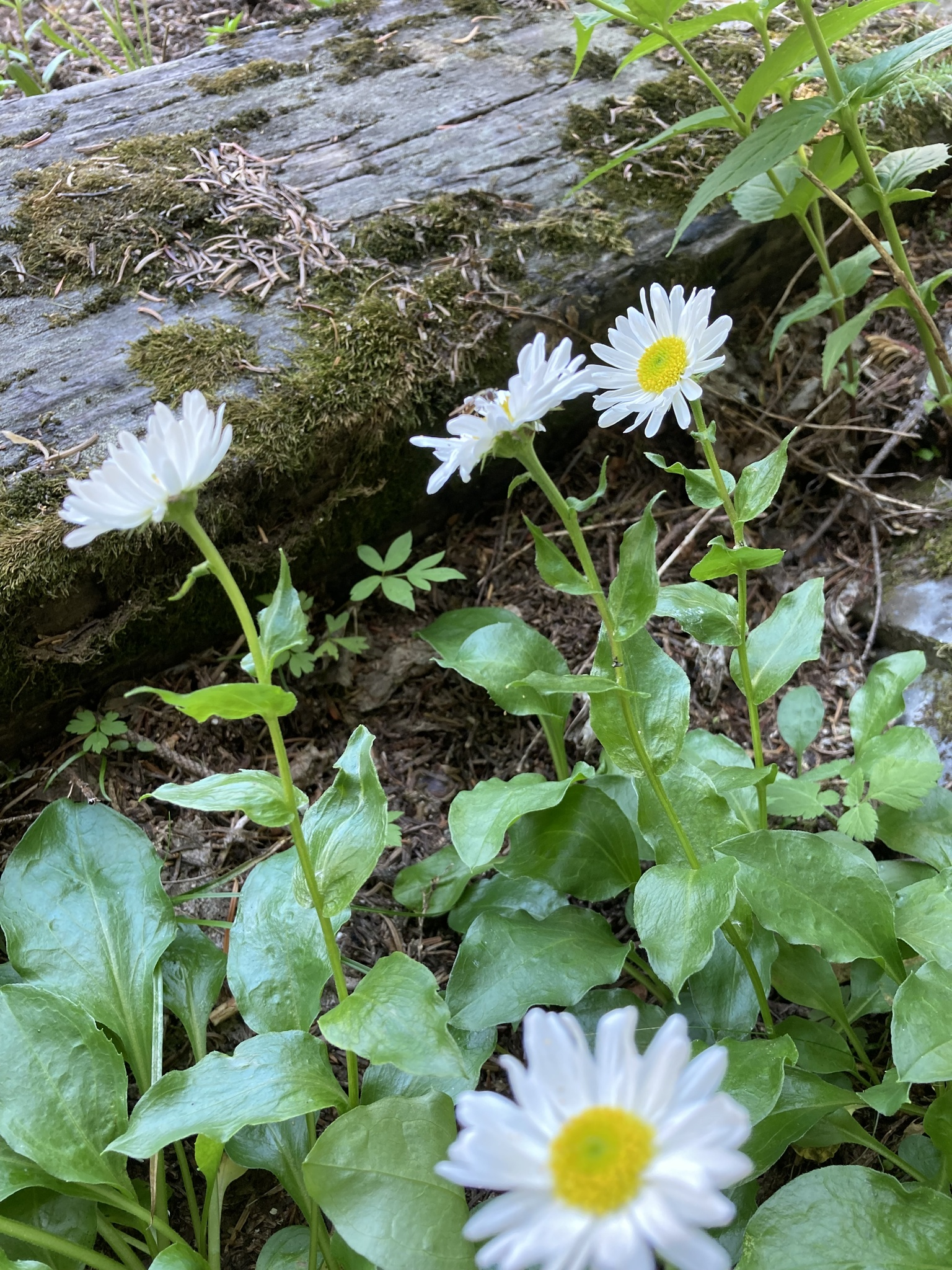
- In Oregon

Scientific classification
- Kingdom: Plantae
- Clade: Tracheophytes
- Clade: Angiosperms
- Clade: Eudicots
- Clade: Asterids
- Order: Asterales
- Family: Asteraceae
- Genus: Erigeron
- Species: E. howellii

Binomial name
- Erigeron howellii (A.Gray) A.Gray

Synonyms
- Erigeron salsuginosus var. howellii A.Gray 1880

= Erigeron howellii =

Species of flowering plant

Erigeron howellii is a rare North American species of flowering plant in the family Asteraceae known as Howell's fleabane. It has been found in the Cascades in the northwestern United States, in northwestern Oregon and southwestern Washington.

Erigeron howellii is a perennial herb up to 50 centimeters (20 inches) tall, spreading by means of underground rhizomes. Each plant generally produces only one flower head, with up to 50 white ray florets surrounding numerous yellow disc florets.
