= Erigeron watsonii =

Scientific classification
- Kingdom: Plantae
- Clade: Tracheophytes
- Clade: Angiosperms
- Clade: Eudicots
- Clade: Asterids
- Order: Asterales
- Family: Asteraceae
- Genus: Erigeron
- Species: E. watsonii

Binomial name
- Erigeron watsonii (A.Gray) Cronquist

Synonyms
- Aster watsonii A.Gray; Erigeron watsoni (A.Gray) Cronquist; Asterigeron watsonii (A.Gray) Rydb.; Aster watsoni A.Gray

Species of flowering plant

Erigeron watsonii is a rare North American species of flowering plant in the family Asteraceae known by the common name Watson's fleabane. It in the mountainous areas of the western United States, in the states of Idaho, Nevada, and Utah.

Erigeron watsonii grows on rocky slopes in open areas featuring sagebrush or pine woodlands. It is a small perennial herb rarely more than 10 centimeters (4 inches) tall, producing a thin taproot and a branching woody caudex. It generally produces only one flower head per stem, but sometimes two. Each head contains 13–25 white or pink ray florets, surrounding numerous yellow disc florets.
