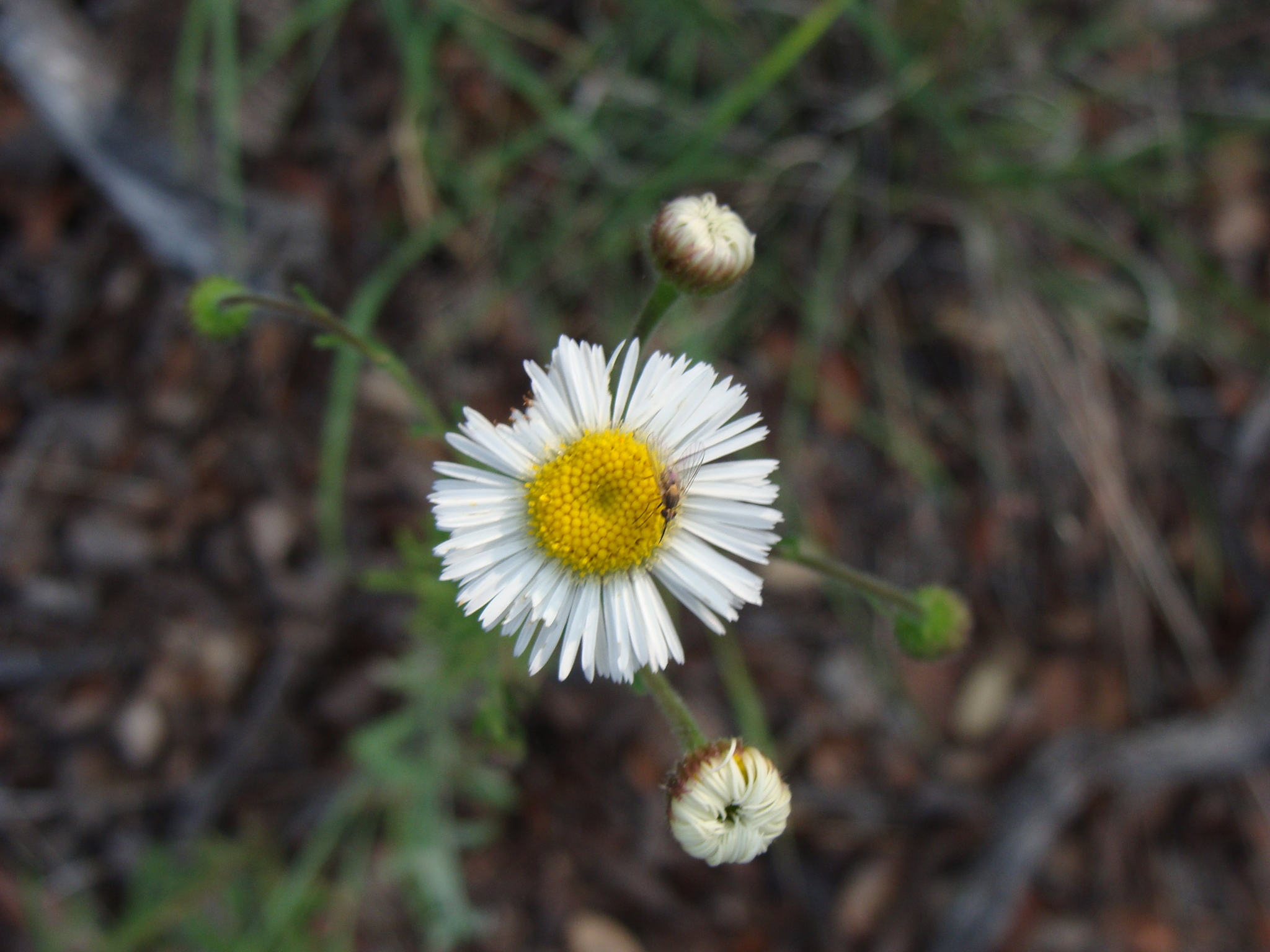

Scientific classification
- Kingdom: Plantae
- Clade: Tracheophytes
- Clade: Angiosperms
- Clade: Eudicots
- Clade: Asterids
- Order: Asterales
- Family: Asteraceae
- Genus: Erigeron
- Species: E. neomexicanus

Binomial name
- Erigeron neomexicanus A.Gray

Synonyms
- Achaetogeron fisheri Larsen; Achaetogeron sophiaefolius Larsen; Diplopappus delphinifolius Cass.; Erigeron delphinifolius A.Gray 1853 (illegitimate homonym, not Willd. 1809); Erigeron delphinifolius subsp. neomexicanus (A. Gray) Cronquist; Erigeron delphinifolius var. euneomexicanus Cronquist

= Erigeron neomexicanus =

Species of flowering plant

Erigeron neomexicanus, the New Mexico fleabane, is a plant species native to New Mexico, Arizona, Sonora, and Chihuahua. It occurs in open sites in grasslands or woodlands, at elevations of 900–3,000 m (3,000–9,800 ft).

Erigeron neomexicanus is a perennial herb with a fairly large taproot. Leaves are fairly large and oblanceolate, with pinnate lobes, the basal leaves up to 2.4 inches (6 cm) long. Cauline (stem) leaves are progressively smaller higher up the stem. Ray and disc flowers are both white.
