= Erigeron bigelovii =

Scientific classification
- Kingdom: Plantae
- Clade: Tracheophytes
- Clade: Angiosperms
- Clade: Eudicots
- Clade: Asterids
- Order: Asterales
- Family: Asteraceae
- Genus: Erigeron
- Species: E. bigelovii

Binomial name
- Erigeron bigelovii A.Gray

Species of flowering plant

Erigeron bigelovii, or Bigelow's fleabane, is a species of fleabane in the family Asteraceae. It is native to northern Mexico (states of Chihuahua, Coahuila, Durango, Nuevo León, Zacatecas) and the southwestern United States (southern New Mexico, western Texas).

Erigeron bigelovii is a perennial herb up to 30 cm (12 inches) tall, with a taproot. It produces flower heads in groups of 1–12 on the ends of branches. Each head can have up to 50 white, pink, or purple ray florets surrounding many small disc florets.
