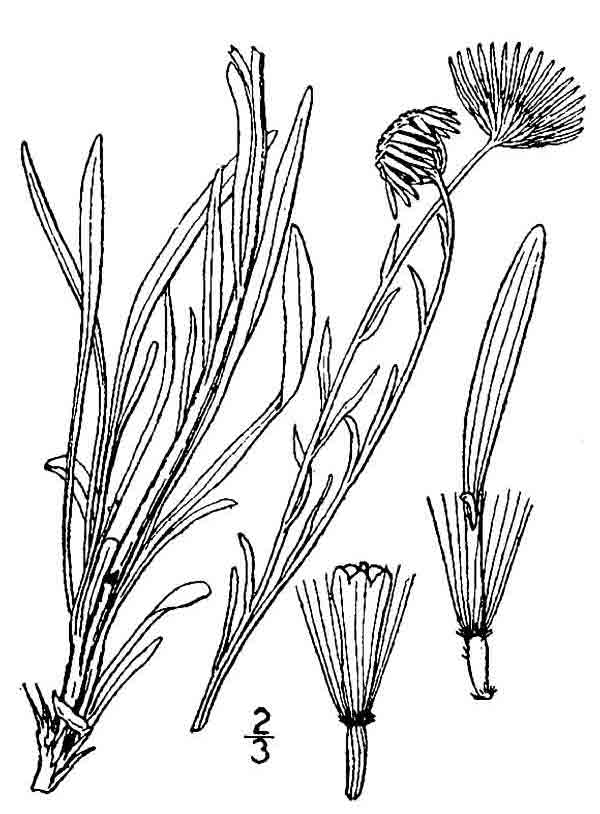

Conservation status
- Apparently Secure (NatureServe)

Scientific classification
- Kingdom: Plantae
- Clade: Tracheophytes
- Clade: Angiosperms
- Clade: Eudicots
- Clade: Asterids
- Order: Asterales
- Family: Asteraceae
- Genus: Erigeron
- Species: E. canus

Binomial name
- Erigeron canus A.Gray

Synonyms
- Erigeron phoenicodontus S.F.Blake; Wyomingia cana (A.Gray) A.Nelson; Erigeron canum A.Gray

= Erigeron canus =

Species of flowering plant

Erigeron canus is a North American species of flowering plants in the family Asteraceae known by the common names hoary fleabane. It is native to northern Mexico (State of Chihuahua) and the western United States (western Great Plains, Rocky Mountains, etc., in Arizona, New Mexico, Colorado, southern Utah, Wyoming, South Dakota, western Nebraska, northwestern Kansas, and the Oklahoma Panhandle).

Erigeron canus is a perennial herb up to 35 cm (14 inches) tall, producing a taproot. One plant can produce several flower heads, sometimes one per branch, sometimes in groups of 2 to 4. Each head has 20–70 white or pale blue ray florets plus numerous yellow disc florets.
