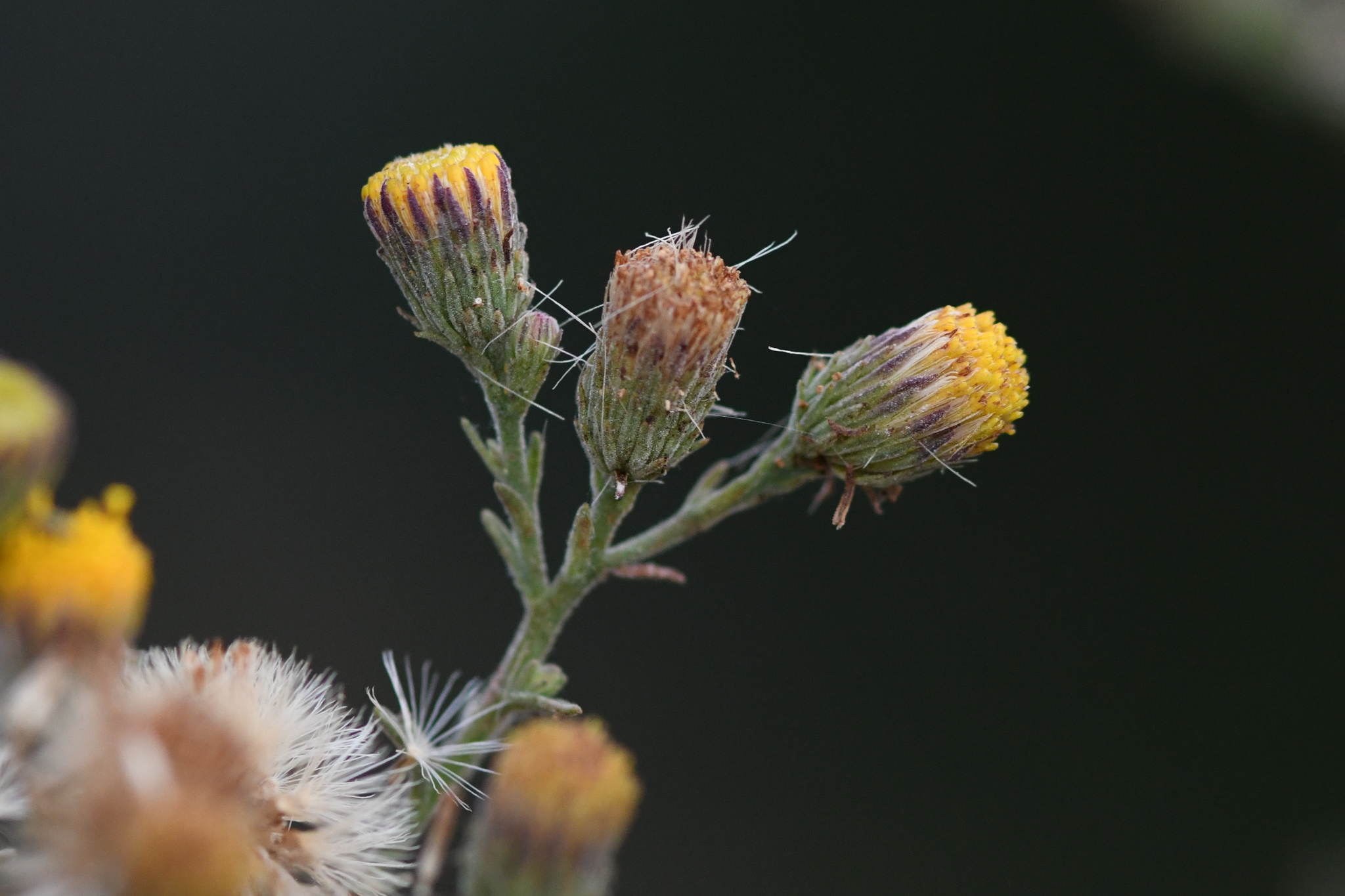

Scientific classification
- Kingdom: Plantae
- Clade: Tracheophytes
- Clade: Angiosperms
- Clade: Eudicots
- Clade: Asterids
- Order: Asterales
- Family: Asteraceae
- Genus: Erigeron
- Species: E. biolettii

Binomial name
- Erigeron biolettii Greene

= Erigeron biolettii =

Species of flowering plant

Erigeron biolettii is a species of flowering plant in the family Asteraceae known by the common names streamside daisy and Bioletti's fleabane. It was named for University of California Professor of Viticulture and Enology Frederick Bioletti when he was an undergraduate. It is endemic to California, where it is known only from the North Coast Ranges from Marin and Solano Counties north to Humboldt County. There is a report of the species growing in Alameda County, but it is from an urban area in Crestmont, hence probably either a cultivated specimen or an escaped introduction.

Erigeron biolettii is a perennial herb producing a branching erect stem up to 90 centimeters (3 feet) tall. It is hairy and very glandular. The inflorescence is a loose array of as many as 15 flower heads at the tips of long, thin branches. Each head is lined with layers of densely glandular purple-tipped phyllaries and contains many yellow disc florets but no ray florets. The fruit is an achene with a pappus of bristles.
