= Erigeron purpuratus =

Scientific classification
- Kingdom: Plantae
- Clade: Tracheophytes
- Clade: Angiosperms
- Clade: Eudicots
- Clade: Asterids
- Order: Asterales
- Family: Asteraceae
- Genus: Erigeron
- Species: E. purpuratus

Binomial name
- Erigeron purpuratus Greene

Species of flowering plant

Erigeron purpuratus is a North American species of flowering plant in the family Asteraceae known by the common name purple fleabane. The species grows in Alaska (part of the United States) and Yukon (part of Canada).

Erigeron purpuratus is a perennial herb up to 14 centimeters (5.6 inches) tall, producing a large branching caudex that serves to spread the plant into clonal clumps. The plant generally produces only 1 flower head per stem, the bracts forming the sides of the head appearing purple. Each head has 40–90 purple, pink or white ray florets surrounding numerous yellow disc florets. The species grows on beaches, gravel bars, and alpine tundra.
