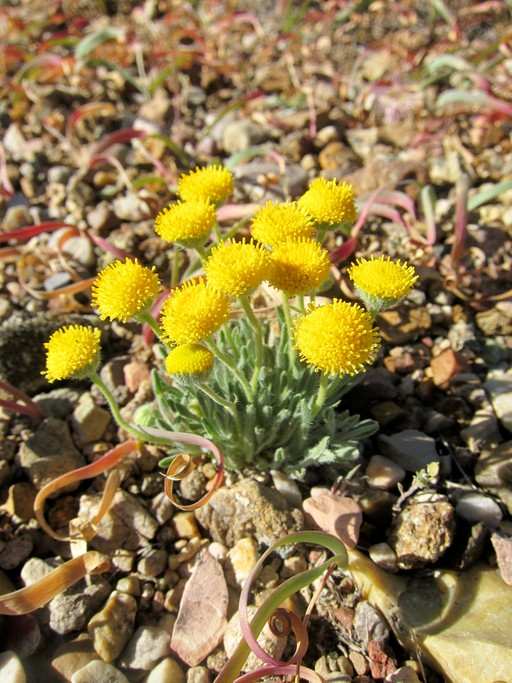

Conservation status
- Secure (NatureServe)

Scientific classification
- Kingdom: Plantae
- Clade: Tracheophytes
- Clade: Angiosperms
- Clade: Eudicots
- Clade: Asterids
- Order: Asterales
- Family: Asteraceae
- Genus: Erigeron
- Species: E. aphanactis

Binomial name
- Erigeron aphanactis (A.Gray) Greene

Synonyms
- Erigeron concinnus var. aphanactis A.Gray; Erigeron congestus Greene

= Erigeron aphanactis =

Species of flowering plant

Erigeron aphanactis is a species of flowering plant in the family Asteraceae known by the common name rayless daisy, or rayless shaggy fleabane. This wildflower is native to the western United States, primarily the Great Basin and Colorado Plateau regions (eastern California, Nevada, Utah, western Colorado, northeastern Arizona, northwestern New Mexico, southern Idaho, eastern Oregon).

Erigeron aphanactis grows in sage, scrub, and open woodland habitat. It is a short, clumping perennial with stem and foliage covered in stiff hairs and resin glands. Most of the narrow, fuzzy leaves are near the base of the plant. The erect stems hold inflorescences of one or more flat, buttonlike flower heads, which contain numerous golden yellow disc florets but no ray florets. Each head is about 10 mm (0.4 inches) wide.

Varieties

- Erigeron aphanactis var. aphanactis - Arizona, California, Colorado, Nevada, New Mexico, Oregon, Utah
- Erigeron aphanactis var. congestus (Greene) Cronquist - California, Nevada, Utah
