= Erigeron jamaicensis =

Scientific classification
- Kingdom: Plantae
- Clade: Tracheophytes
- Clade: Angiosperms
- Clade: Eudicots
- Clade: Asterids
- Order: Asterales
- Family: Asteraceae
- Genus: Erigeron
- Species: E. jamaicensis

Binomial name
- Erigeron jamaicensis L.

Synonyms
- Aster jamaicensis (L.) Less.; Erigeron rivularis Sw.

Species of flowering plant

Erigeron jamaicensis is a Caribbean and Mesoamerican species of flowering plant in the family Asteraceae commonly called Jamaican fleabane. It is native to Mexico, Central America, and the Greater Antilles.

Erigeron jamaicensis is a perennial herb sprouting from a rootstock. Stems are long and slender, up to 30 cm (12 inches) tall. Each stem has one or a few flower heads, each with white ray florets and yellow disc florets.
