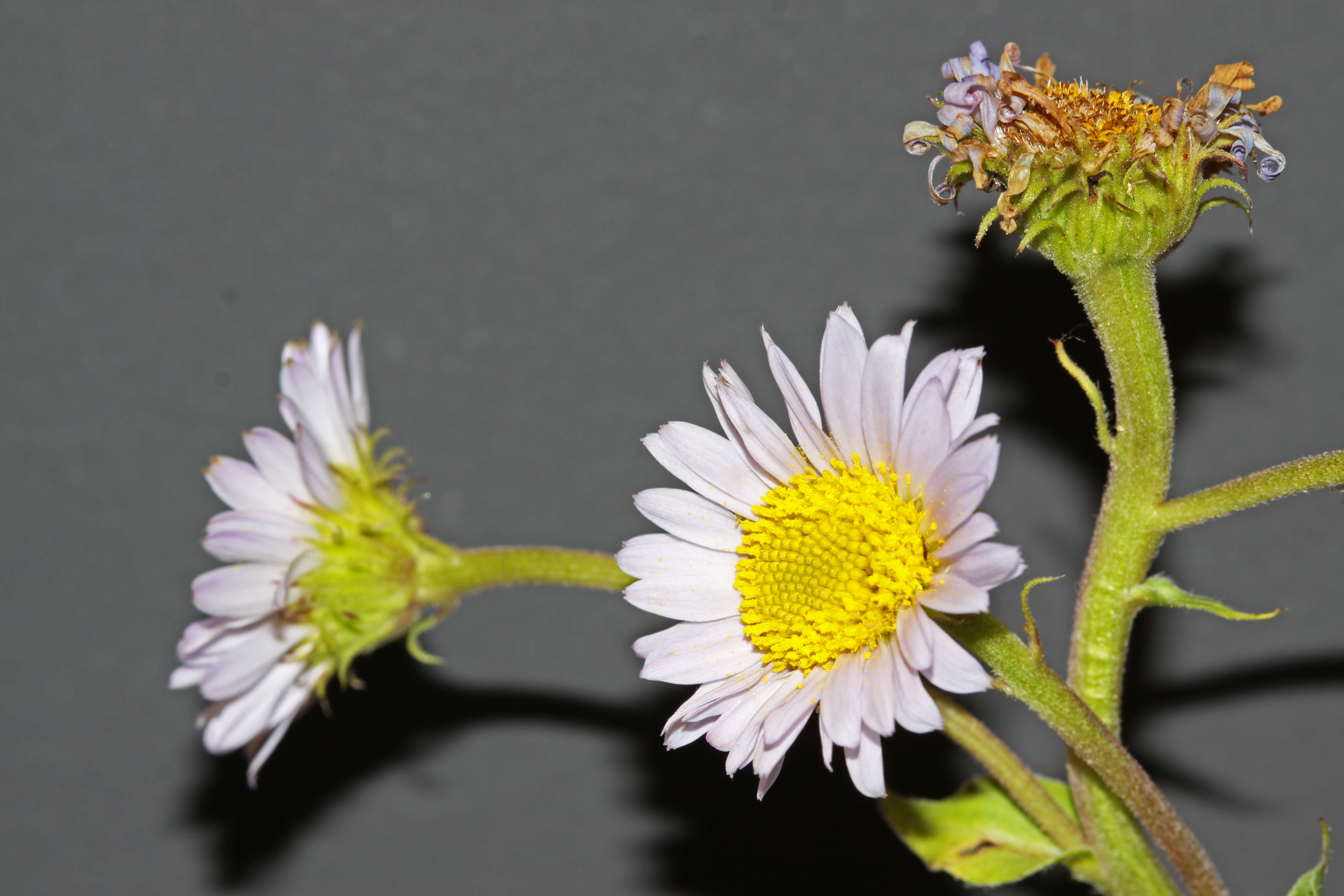

Conservation status
- Apparently Secure (NatureServe)

Scientific classification
- Kingdom: Plantae
- Clade: Tracheophytes
- Clade: Angiosperms
- Clade: Eudicots
- Clade: Asterids
- Order: Asterales
- Family: Asteraceae
- Genus: Erigeron
- Species: E. eximius

Binomial name
- Erigeron eximius Greene

Synonyms
- Erigeron apiculatus Greene 1912 not Benth. 1845; Erigeron eldensis Greene; Erigeron superbus Greene ex Rydb.

= Erigeron eximius =

Species of flowering plant

Erigeron eximius is a North American species of flowering plants in the family Asteraceae known by the common name spruce-fir fleabane.

Erigeron eximius is native to the western United States. It is found in alpine meadows and in openings in aspen and spruce/fir forests in Wyoming, Colorado, Utah, Arizona, New Mexico, and western Texas.

Erigeron eximius is a perennial herb up to 60 centimeters (2 feet) in height, spreading by means of underground rhizomes. Each stem can produce 1-15 flower heads, each with as many as 80 blue or lavender ray florets surrounding numerous yellow disc florets.
