= Erigeron oxyphyllus =

Scientific classification
- Kingdom: Plantae
- Clade: Tracheophytes
- Clade: Angiosperms
- Clade: Eudicots
- Clade: Asterids
- Order: Asterales
- Family: Asteraceae
- Genus: Erigeron
- Species: E. oxyphyllus

Binomial name
- Erigeron oxyphyllus Greene

Species of flowering plant

Erigeron oxyphyllus is a species of flowering plant in the family Asteraceae known by the common name wand fleabane. It is native to northwestern Mexico (state of Sonora) and the southwestern United States (mostly Arizona but with a few populations in the Whipple Mountains just west of the Colorado River in California).

Erigeron oxyphyllus is a branching perennial herb up to 25 centimeters (10 inches) tall, producing a woody taproot. The leaves and the stem are covered with hairs. The plant generally produces 1-3 flower heads per stem, each head with 12–45 white, blue, or lavender ray florets surrounding numerous yellow disc florets.
