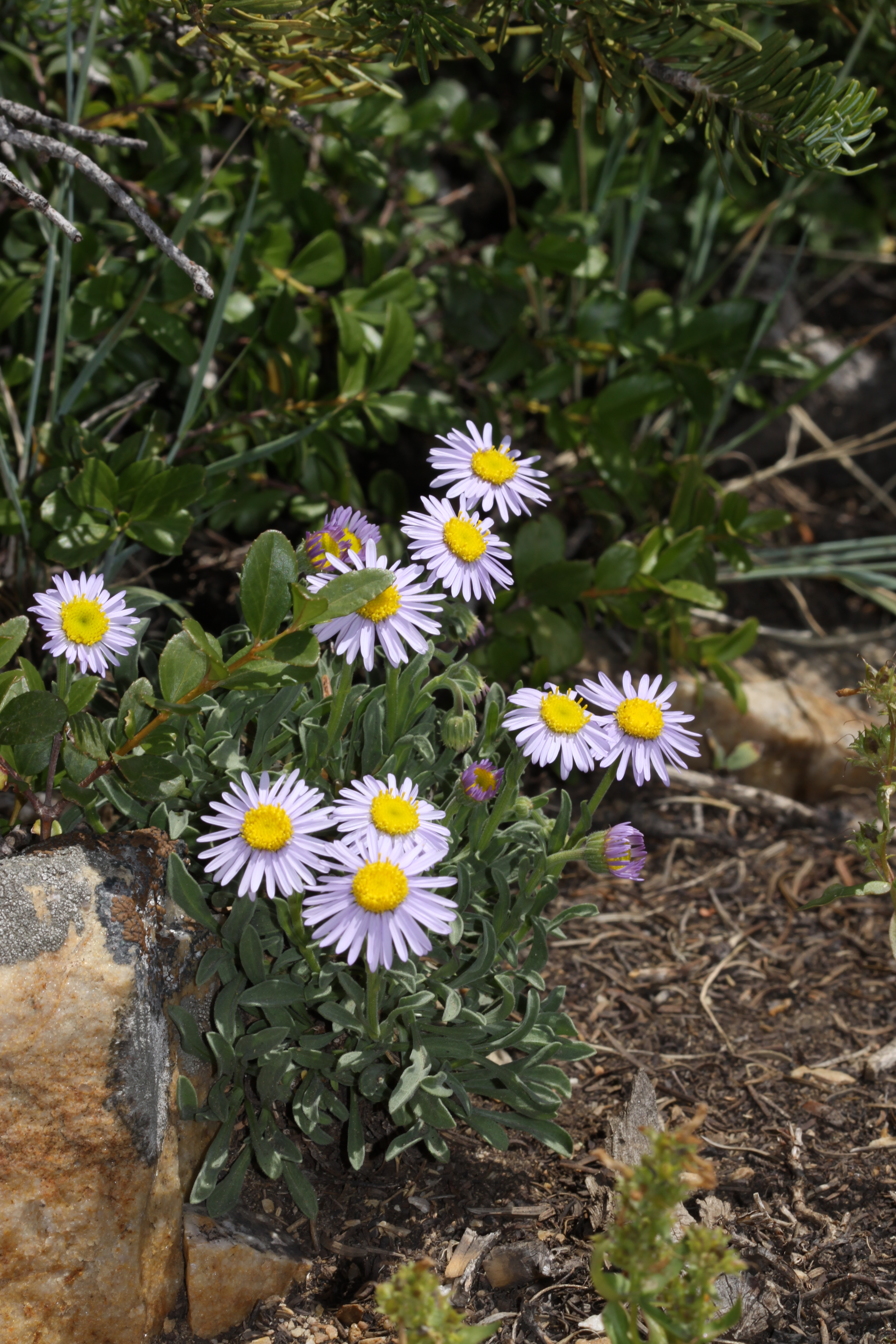

Scientific classification
- Kingdom: Plantae
- Clade: Tracheophytes
- Clade: Angiosperms
- Clade: Eudicots
- Clade: Asterids
- Order: Asterales
- Family: Asteraceae
- Genus: Erigeron
- Species: E. tener

Binomial name
- Erigeron tener (A.Gray) A.Gray 1880

Synonyms
- Erigeron caespitosus var. tener A.Gray 1876

= Erigeron tener =

Species of flowering plant

Erigeron tener is a North American species of flowering plant in the family Asteraceae known by the common name slender fleabane. It is native to the western United States, largely in the Great Basin, in the states of California, Arizona, Nevada, Utah, Oregon, Wyoming, Idaho, and Montana.

Erigeron tener grows in open, rocky habitats. It is a perennial herb up to 20 centimeters (8 inches) tall, producing a large taproot and a woody caudex. It is surrounded at the base by narrow oval leaves up to 8 cm (3.2 inches) long, on petioles. There may be a few much smaller leaves along the stem. The inflorescence is made up of 1-3 flower heads per stem, each head lined with hairy, glandular phyllaries. The head contains 15–40 blue or purple ray florets surrounding numerous yellow disc florets.
