= Erigeron pringlei =

Scientific classification
- Kingdom: Plantae
- Clade: Tracheophytes
- Clade: Angiosperms
- Clade: Eudicots
- Clade: Asterids
- Order: Asterales
- Family: Asteraceae
- Genus: Erigeron
- Species: E. pringlei

Binomial name
- Erigeron pringlei A.Gray

Species of flowering plant

Erigeron pringlei is a North American species of flowering plant in the family Asteraceae known by the common name Pringle's fleabane. It has been found in only in the state of Arizona in the southwestern United States.

Erigeron pringlei is a perennial herb up to 16 centimeters (6.4 inches) tall, producing a thick underground woody caudex. The plant generally produces only 1 flower head per stem but sometimes 2 or 3. Each head has 20–35 pink or white ray florets surrounding numerous yellow disc florets. The species grows on ledges and in cracks in cliff faces.
