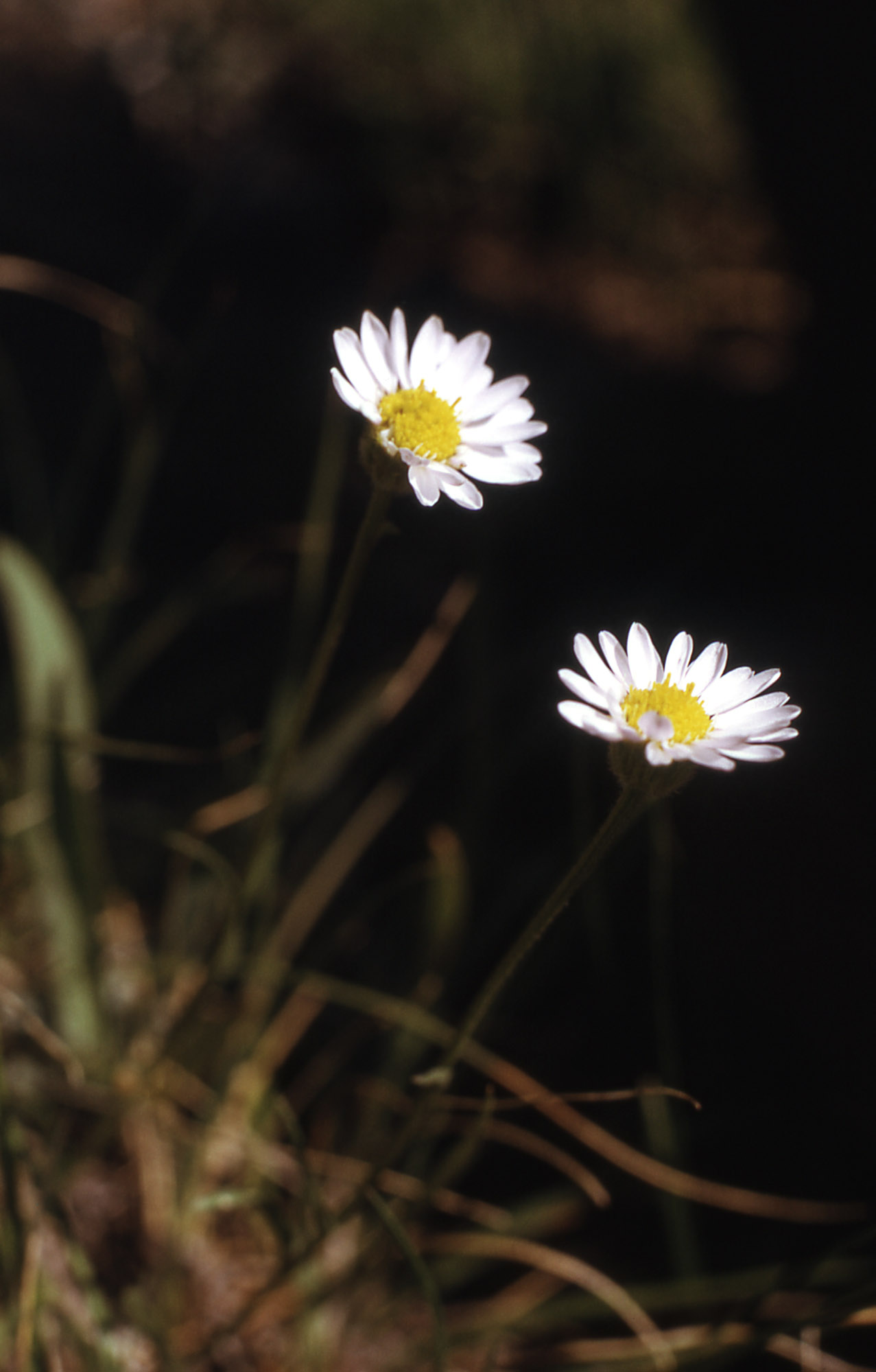

Conservation status
- Secure (NatureServe)

Scientific classification
- Kingdom: Plantae
- Clade: Tracheophytes
- Clade: Angiosperms
- Clade: Eudicots
- Clade: Asterids
- Order: Asterales
- Family: Asteraceae
- Genus: Erigeron
- Species: E. eatonii

Binomial name
- Erigeron eatonii A.Gray

Synonyms
- Synonymy: Erigeron eatoni A.Gray; Erigeron microlonchus Greene; Erigeron ochroleucus D.C.Eaton 1871, not Nutt. 1840; Erigeron tener M.E.Jones; Erigeron pacificus Howell, syn of var. lavandulus; Erigeron nevadensis A.Gray 1873, not Wedd. 1857, syn of var. nevadincola; Erigeron nevadincola S.F.Blake, syn of var. nevadincola; Erigeron plantagineus Greene, syn of var. plantagineus; Erigeron robertianus Greene, syn of var. plantagineus; Erigeron sonnei Greene, syn of var. sonnei

= Erigeron eatonii =

Species of flowering plant

Erigeron eatonii is a North American species of flowering plants in the family Asteraceae known by the common name Eaton's fleabane.

Erigeron eatonii is native to much of the western United States where it grows in many habitats from grassland to scrub to woodland. It has been found in every state in the contiguous United States west of the Rocky Mountains, though it is missing from large sections of that region such as southern California, northern Montana, and most of New Mexico.

Erigeron eatonii is a small perennial daisy reaching a maximum height of anywhere from 4 to 30 centimeters (1.6-12.0 inches). It grows from a taproot and has hairy stems which may be erect or drooping. The leaves are narrow and lance-shaped, with three veins and raspy hairs. They are basal and also continue up the stems. Atop each stem is an inflorescence of one or more flower heads, each up to 2.5 centimeters (1 inch) wide. The center is packed with yellow disc florets surrounded by short ray florets around the edge. The rays are bright white, sometimes tinted blue or pink on the undersides.

Varieties

- Erigeron eatonii var. eatonii - Arizona, Colorado, New Mexico, Idaho, Montana, Nevada, Utah, Wyoming
- Erigeron eatonii var. lavandulus Strother & Ferlatte - Idaho, Oregon
- Erigeron eatonii var. nevadincola (S.F.Blake) G.L.Nesom - California, Nevada
- Erigeron eatonii var. plantagineus (Greene) Cronquist - California, Oregon
- Erigeron eatonii var. sonnei (Greene) G.L.Nesom - California, Nevada
- Erigeron eatonii var. villosus (Cronquist) Cronquist - Idaho, Oregon, Washington
