= Erigeron wilkenii =

Conservation status
- Critically Imperiled (NatureServe)

Scientific classification
- Kingdom: Plantae
- Clade: Embryophytes
- Clade: Tracheophytes
- Clade: Spermatophytes
- Clade: Angiosperms
- Clade: Eudicots
- Clade: Asterids
- Order: Asterales
- Family: Asteraceae
- Genus: Erigeron
- Species: E. wilkenii

Binomial name
- Erigeron wilkenii O'Kane

Species of flowering plant

Erigeron wilkenii is a rare North American species of flowering plant in the family Asteraceae known by the common names Wilken's fleabane and Dieter's erigeron. It has been found only inside Dinosaur National Monument in the US state of Colorado.

Erigeron wilkenii grows in the alluvium and rocky slopes inside a sandstone canyon. It is a perennial herb up to 20 centimeters (8 inches) tall, producing a thin taproot but not spreading to create clumps as is the case with many related species. It generally produces only one flower head per stem. Each head contains 8–12 ray florets, the rays white from the front but pink from the rear. These surround numerous yellow disc florets.
