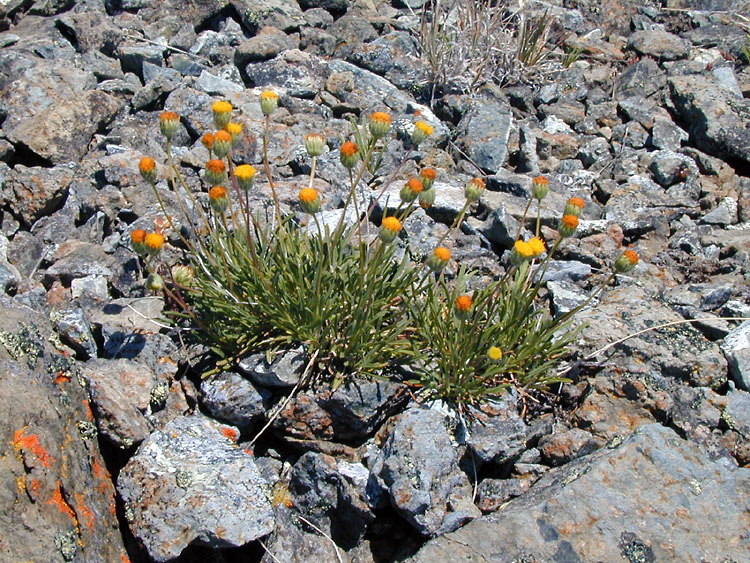

Scientific classification
- Kingdom: Plantae
- Clade: Tracheophytes
- Clade: Angiosperms
- Clade: Eudicots
- Clade: Asterids
- Order: Asterales
- Family: Asteraceae
- Genus: Erigeron
- Species: E. bloomeri

Binomial name
- Erigeron bloomeri Gray

Synonyms
- Erigeron nudatus A.Gray, syn of var. nudatus

= Erigeron bloomeri =

Species of flowering plant

Erigeron bloomeri is a North American species of flowering plants in the family Asteraceae known by the common name scabland fleabane.

== Description ==
Erigeron bloomeri is a short, small perennial herb rarely more than 20 cm (8 inches) tall, forming clumps over a taproot. It has mostly basal leaves several centimeters long which may be densely hairy to nearly hairless. Atop the short erect stems are inflorescences consisting of single flower heads. Each head is 1-2 centimeters (0.4-0.8 inches) wide and is packed with many small golden yellow disc florets, but no ray florets.

== Range and Habitat ==
Erigeron bloomeri is native to the slopes, meadows, and hillsides of the western United States (California, Nevada, Oregon, Idaho, northwestern Utah and central Washington).

Varieties

- Erigeron bloomeri var. bloomeri - California, Idaho, Nevada, Oregon, Utah, Washington
- Erigeron bloomeri var. nudatus (A.Gray) Cronquist - Del Norte and Siskiyou Counties in extreme northern California

== Gallery ==
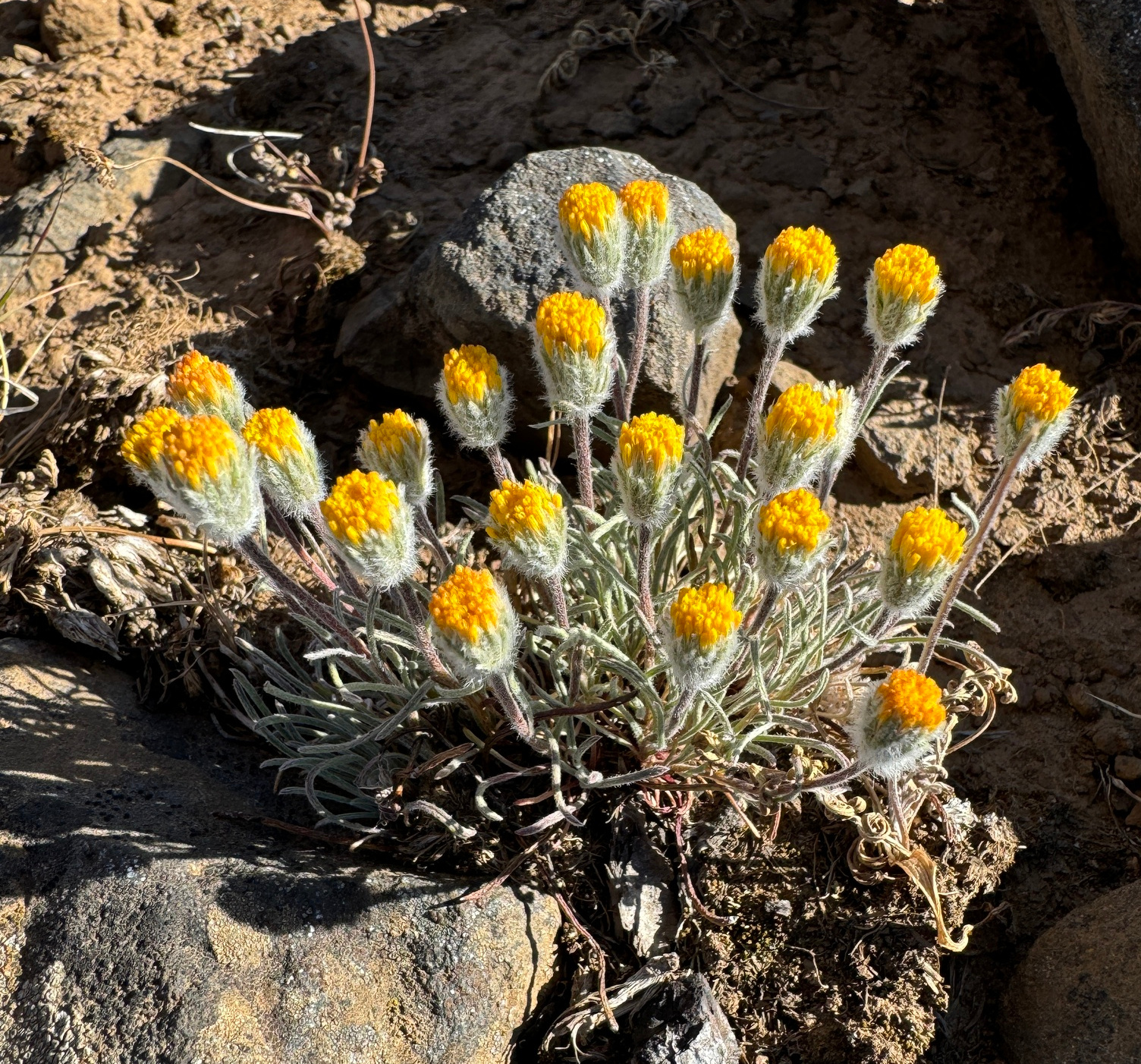
var. bloomeri
