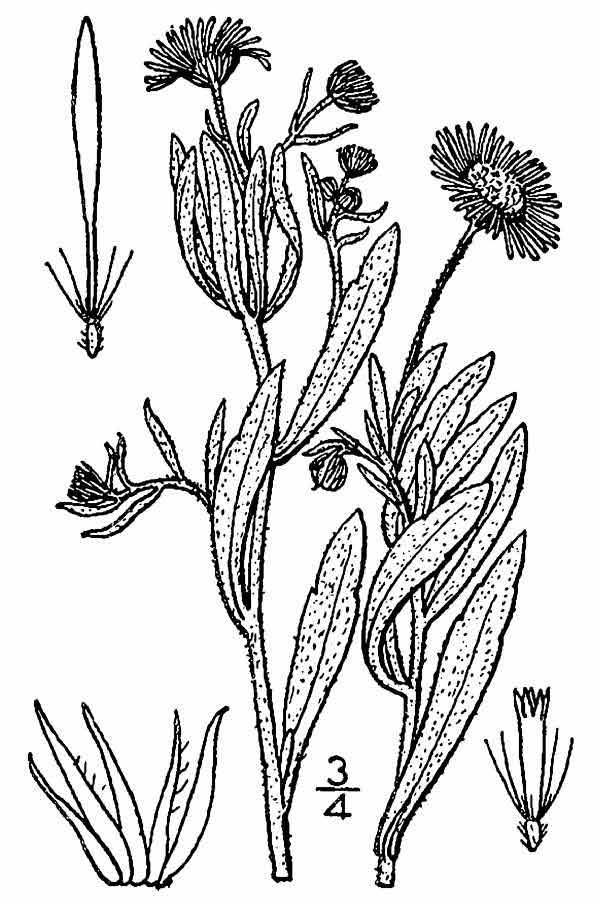

Scientific classification
- Kingdom: Plantae
- Clade: Tracheophytes
- Clade: Angiosperms
- Clade: Eudicots
- Clade: Asterids
- Order: Asterales
- Family: Asteraceae
- Genus: Erigeron
- Species: E. tenuis

Binomial name
- Erigeron tenuis Torr. & A.Gray

Synonyms
- Erigeron tenue Torr. & A.Gray; Erigeron quercifolium DC. 1836 not Lam. 1794; Erigeron quercifolius DC. 1836 not Lam. 1794

= Erigeron tenuis =

Species of flowering plant

Erigeron tenuis is a North American species of flowering plant in the family Asteraceae known by the common name slender-leaf fleabane. It is native to the south-central part of the United States from central Texas to the Florida Panhandle, north as far as Missouri and Kansas.

Erigeron tenuis grows in pastures and open woodlands as well as on roadsides and in fence rows. It is an biennial or perennial herb up to 45 centimeters (17 inches) tall, producing unbranched underground caudex. Leaves are narrowly oblanceolate, up to 13 cm (2.5 inches) long. The inflorescence is made up of 1-60 flower heads per stem, in a loose array. Each head contains 60–120 blue, white or pale lavender ray florets surrounding numerous yellow disc florets.
