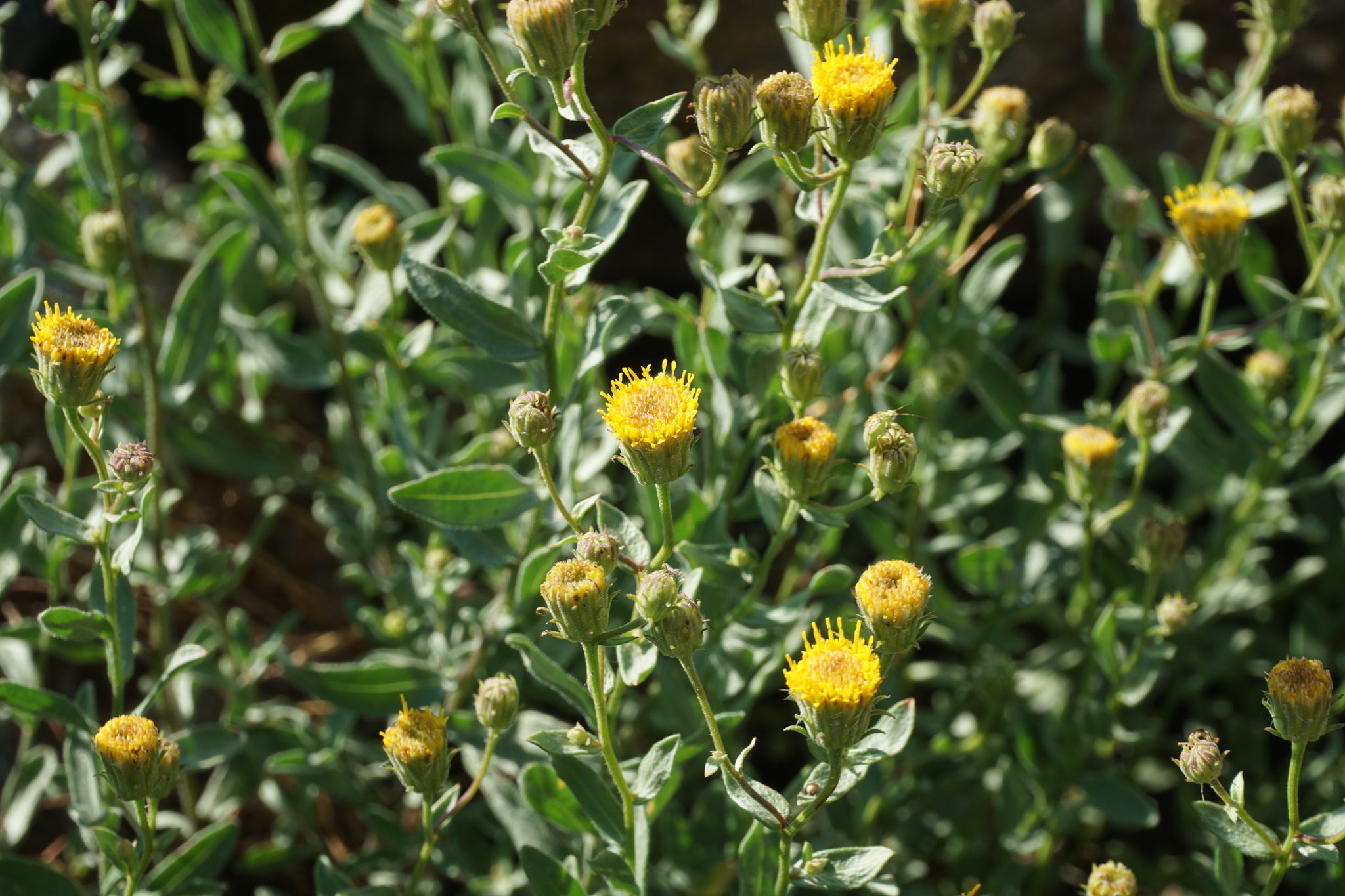
- Erigeron petrophilus var. viscidulus

Scientific classification
- Kingdom: Plantae
- Clade: Tracheophytes
- Clade: Angiosperms
- Clade: Eudicots
- Clade: Asterids
- Order: Asterales
- Family: Asteraceae
- Genus: Erigeron
- Species: E. petrophilus

Binomial name
- Erigeron petrophilus Greene

Synonyms
- Erigeron decumbens Eastw. 1906 not Nutt. 1840, syn of var. viscidulus; Erigeron inornatus var. viscidulus A.Gray, syn of var. viscidulus; Erigeron viscidulus (A.Gray) Greene, syn of var. viscidulus

= Erigeron petrophilus =

Species of flowering plant

Erigeron petrophilus is a species of flowering plant in the family Asteraceae known by the common names rockloving erigeron or cliff fleabane. It is native to the mountain ranges of California from Siskiyou County south as far as San Luis Obispo County and El Dorado County. It also grows in southwestern Oregon.

Erigeron petrophilus grows in forest and woodland, often, as its name suggests, in rocky habitat. It is sometimes grows on serpentine soils. This is a perennial herb growing many hairy, glandular, spreading stems from a tough, woody caudex. The narrow, oblong leaves are equal in size and spaced evenly along each stem. The inflorescence is a cluster of several flower heads, each just over a centimeter (0.5 inches) wide and lined with layers of fuzzy, glandular phyllaries. The heads contains many yellow disc florets but no ray florets. The fruit is a small achene with a pappus of bristles.

Varieties

- Erigeron petrophilus var. petrophilus - Coast Ranges from Siskiyou County to Monterey County
- Erigeron petrophilus var. sierrensis, the Sierra erigeron or northern Sierra daisy - northern Sierra Nevada of California from El Dorado County to Plumas County
- Erigeron petrophilus var. viscidulus (A. Gray) G. L. Nesom, the Klamath rock daisy - Klamath Mountains of northwestern California + southwestern Oregon, plus Coast Ranges as far south as Sonoma County and Sierra Nevada foothills in Butte County
