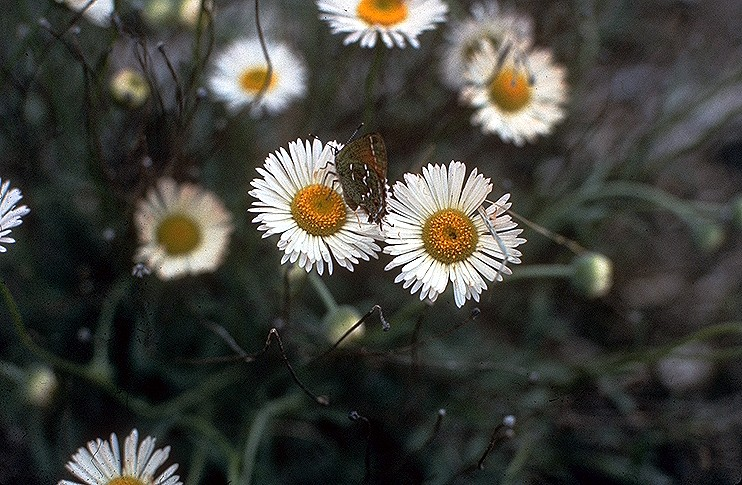

Scientific classification
- Kingdom: Plantae
- Clade: Tracheophytes
- Clade: Angiosperms
- Clade: Eudicots
- Clade: Asterids
- Order: Asterales
- Family: Asteraceae
- Genus: Erigeron
- Species: E. modestus

Binomial name
- Erigeron modestus A.Gray

Synonyms
- Erigeron modestum A.Gray; Erigeron lobatus var. warnockii Shinners; Erigeron plateauensis Cronquist; Erigeron warnockii (Shinners) Shinners

= Erigeron modestus =

North American species of flowering daisy

Erigeron modestus is a North American species of flowering plant in the family Asteraceae known by the common name plains fleabane. It native to northern Mexico (Coahuila, Chihuahua, Nuevo León) and the southwestern and south-central parts of the United States (Arizona, New Mexico, Texas, Oklahoma, Kansas).

Erigeron modestus is a branching perennial herb up to 40 centimeters (16 inches) tall, producing a woody taproot. The leaves are spatula-shaped and up to 10 cm (4 inches) long near the bottom of the plant, but narrower and shorter higher up the stem. Flower heads sometimes can have as many as 170 white ray florets surrounding numerous yellow disc florets.
