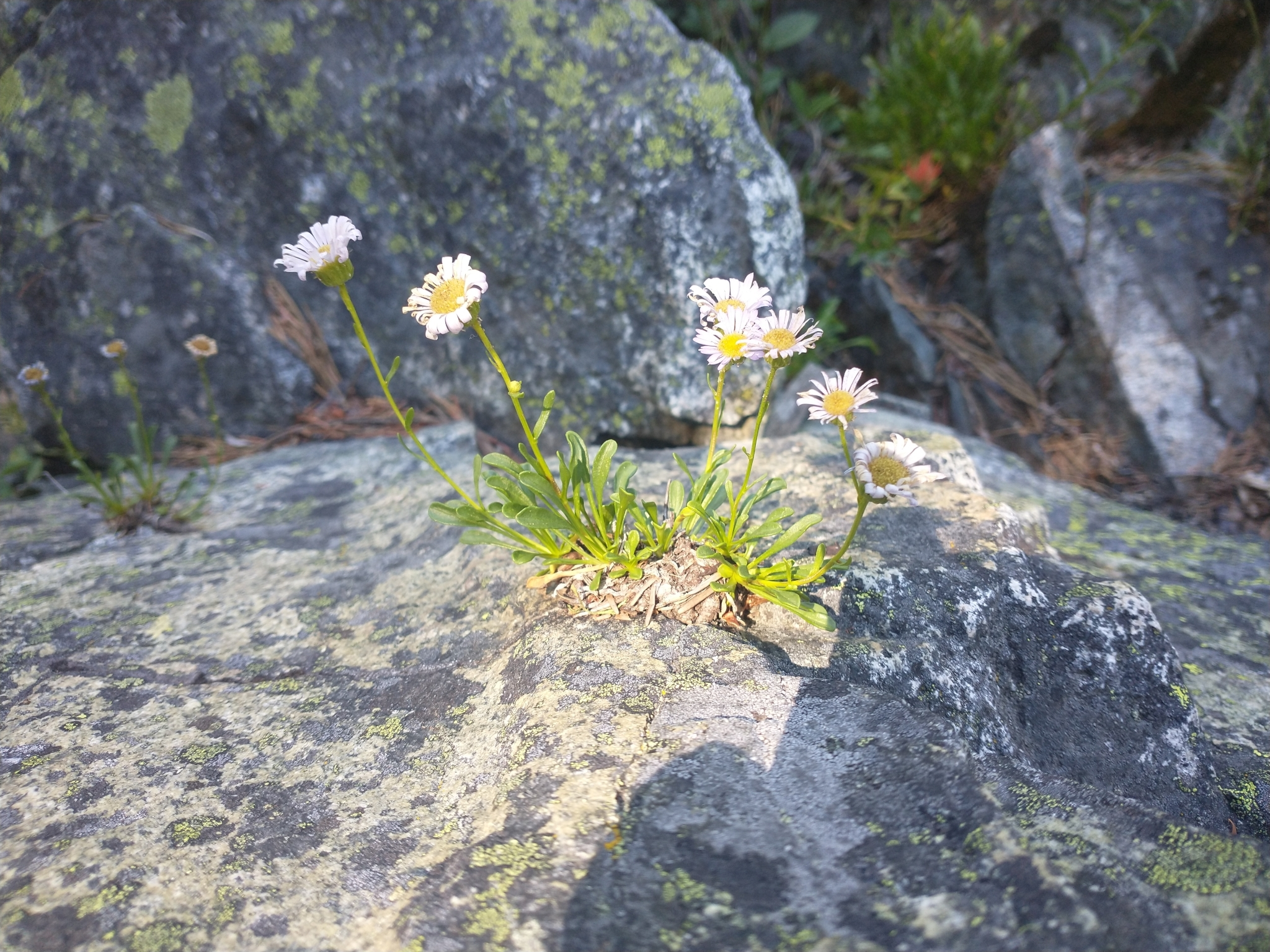

Scientific classification
- Kingdom: Plantae
- Clade: Tracheophytes
- Clade: Angiosperms
- Clade: Eudicots
- Clade: Asterids
- Order: Asterales
- Family: Asteraceae
- Genus: Erigeron
- Species: E. cervinus

Binomial name
- Erigeron cervinus Greene

Synonyms
- Erigeron delicatus Cronquist

= Erigeron cervinus =

Species of flowering plant

Erigeron cervinus is a North American species of flowering plant in the family Asteraceae known by the common names Siskiyou fleabane and Siskiyou daisy.

Erigeron cervinus is native to the Klamath Mountains of northwestern California and southwestern Oregon. This uncommon wildflower is a perennial herb reaching heights of 15 to 30 centimeters (8-12 inches). Its leaves may be up to 12 centimeters (5 inches) long and are vaguely spoon-shaped. The erect stems hold inflorescences of 1 to 4 flower heads. Each head is about a centimeter (0.4 inches) wide and has a center of golden yellow disc florets surrounded by a fringe of ray florets which are usually white.
