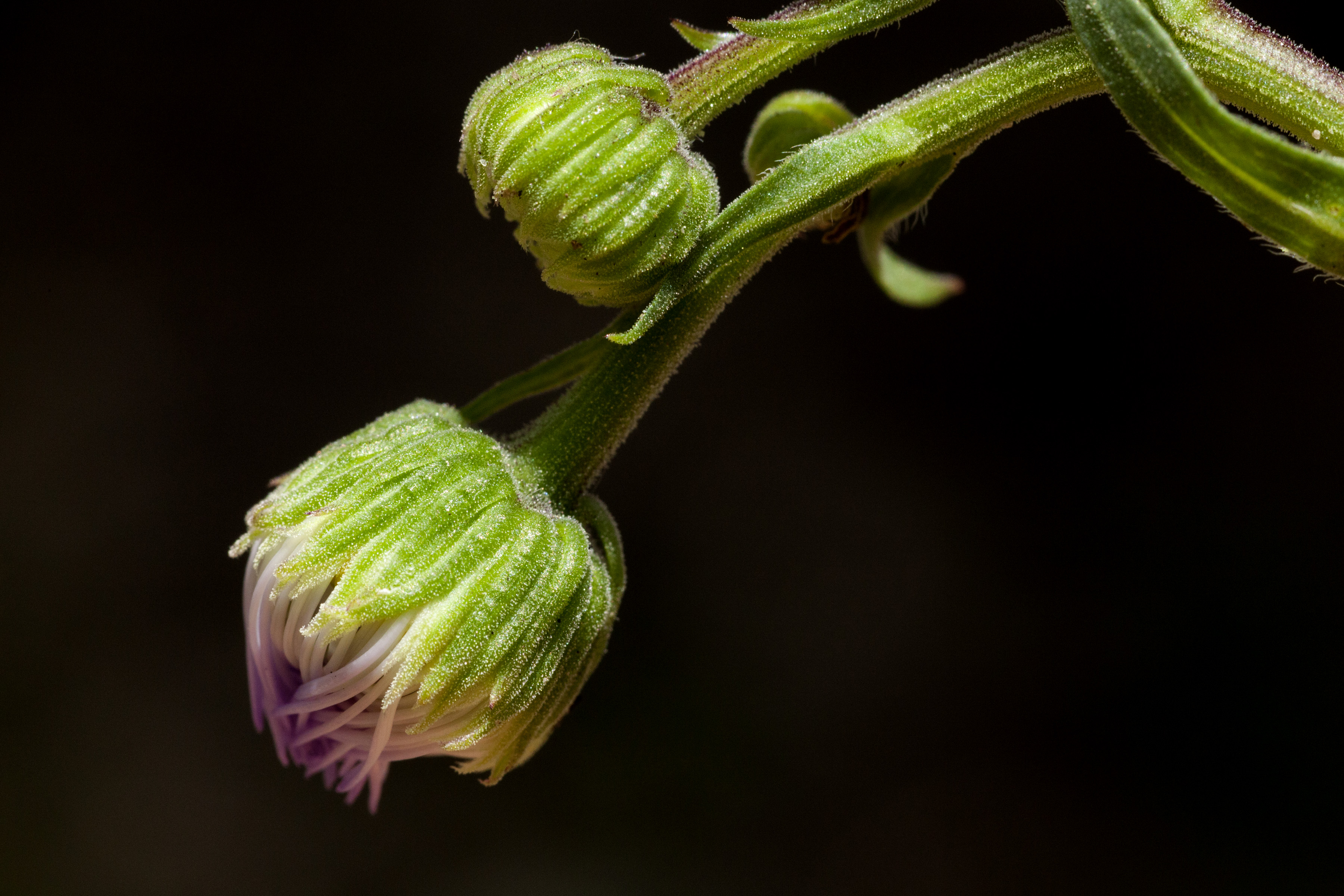
- In New Mexico

Scientific classification
- Kingdom: Plantae
- Clade: Tracheophytes
- Clade: Angiosperms
- Clade: Eudicots
- Clade: Asterids
- Order: Asterales
- Family: Asteraceae
- Genus: Erigeron
- Species: E. arizonicus

Binomial name
- Erigeron arizonicus A.Gray

Synonyms
- Erigeron huachucanus Greene; Erigeron rusbyi A.Gray

= Erigeron arizonicus =

Species of flowering plant

Erigeron arizonicus is a species of flowering plant in the family Asteraceae known by the common name Arizona fleabane. It is native to the southwestern United States (Arizona, New Mexico) and northwestern Mexico (Sonora).

Erigeron arizonicus is a perennial herb up to 60 cm (2 feet) tall, spreading by means of underground rhizomes. It produces 1-6 flower heads per branch, each head containing 25–80 white ray florets and many small yellow disc florets.
