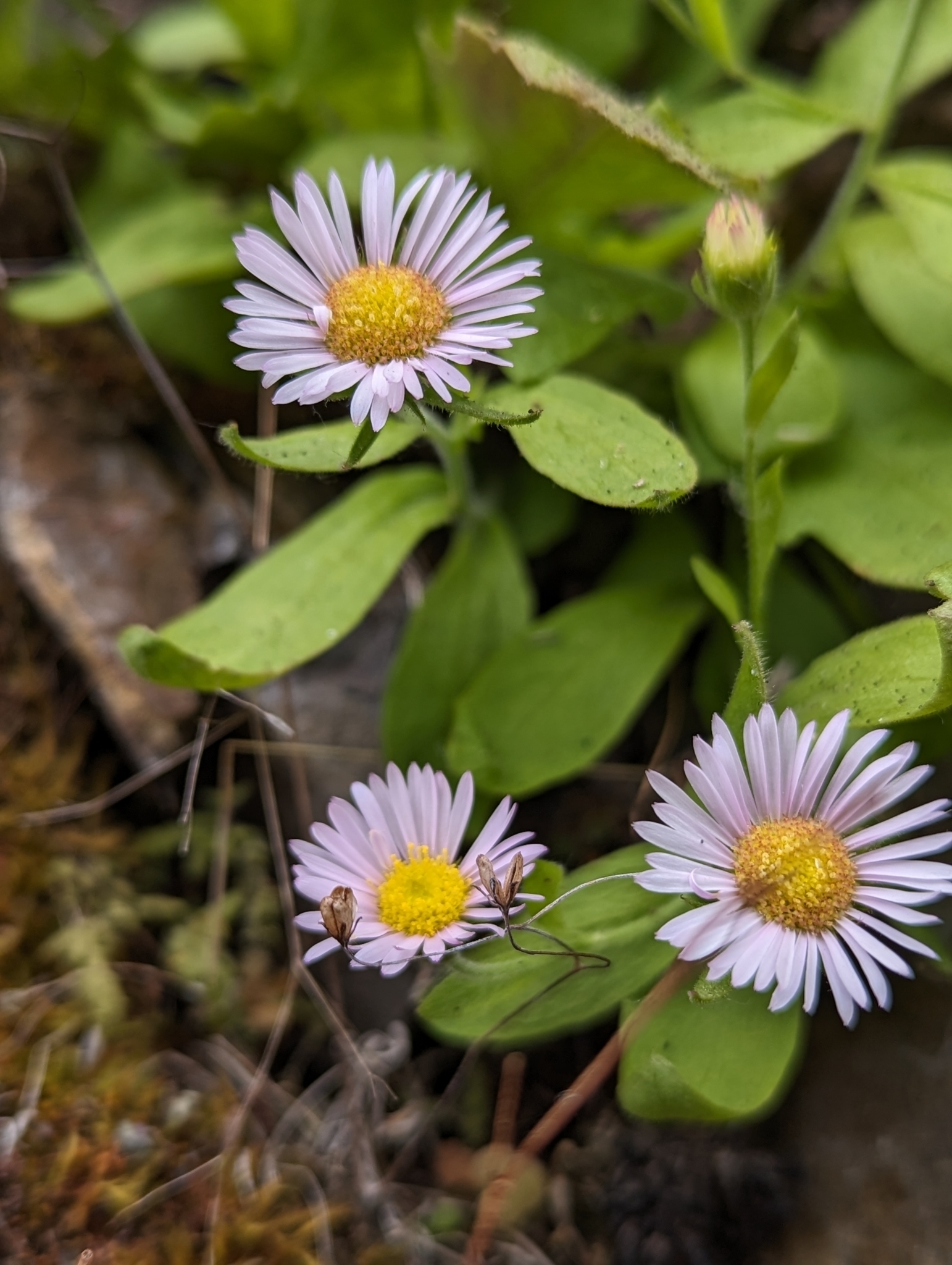

Scientific classification
- Kingdom: Plantae
- Clade: Tracheophytes
- Clade: Angiosperms
- Clade: Eudicots
- Clade: Asterids
- Order: Asterales
- Family: Asteraceae
- Genus: Erigeron
- Species: E. oreganus

Binomial name
- Erigeron oreganus A.Gray

= Erigeron oreganus =

Species of flowering plant

Erigeron oreganus is a rare North American species of flowering plant in the family Asteraceae, called the gorge fleabane. It has been found only in the Columbia River Gorge along the border between the US states of Washington and Oregon.

Erigeron oreganus is a perennial herb up to 15 centimeters (6 inches) tall, with a large taproot. The plant generally produces 1-4 flower heads per stem, each head with up to 60 white or pink ray florets surrounding numerous yellow disc florets. The species grows in moist, shaded cliffs and ledges.
