= Erigeron hultenii =

Scientific classification
- Kingdom: Plantae
- Clade: Tracheophytes
- Clade: Angiosperms
- Clade: Eudicots
- Clade: Asterids
- Order: Asterales
- Family: Asteraceae
- Genus: Erigeron
- Species: E. hultenii

Binomial name
- Erigeron hultenii Spongberg

Species of flowering plant

Erigeron hultenii is a rare North American species of flowering plants in the family Asteraceae known as Hulten's fleabane. It has been found in the state of Alaska in the United States, from Campbell Creek Valley about 11 miles (17.6 km) north of Anchorage.

Erigeron hultenii is a small perennial rarely more than 7 centimeters (2.8 inches) tall. Most of the leaves are on the lower part of the stem. Each plant generally produces only one flower head, with up to 45 pink or lavender ray florets surrounding numerous yellow disc florets.

The species is named for Swedish botanist Oskar Eric Gunnar Hultén (1894 - 1981), one of the most prolific authorities on Alaskan botany.
