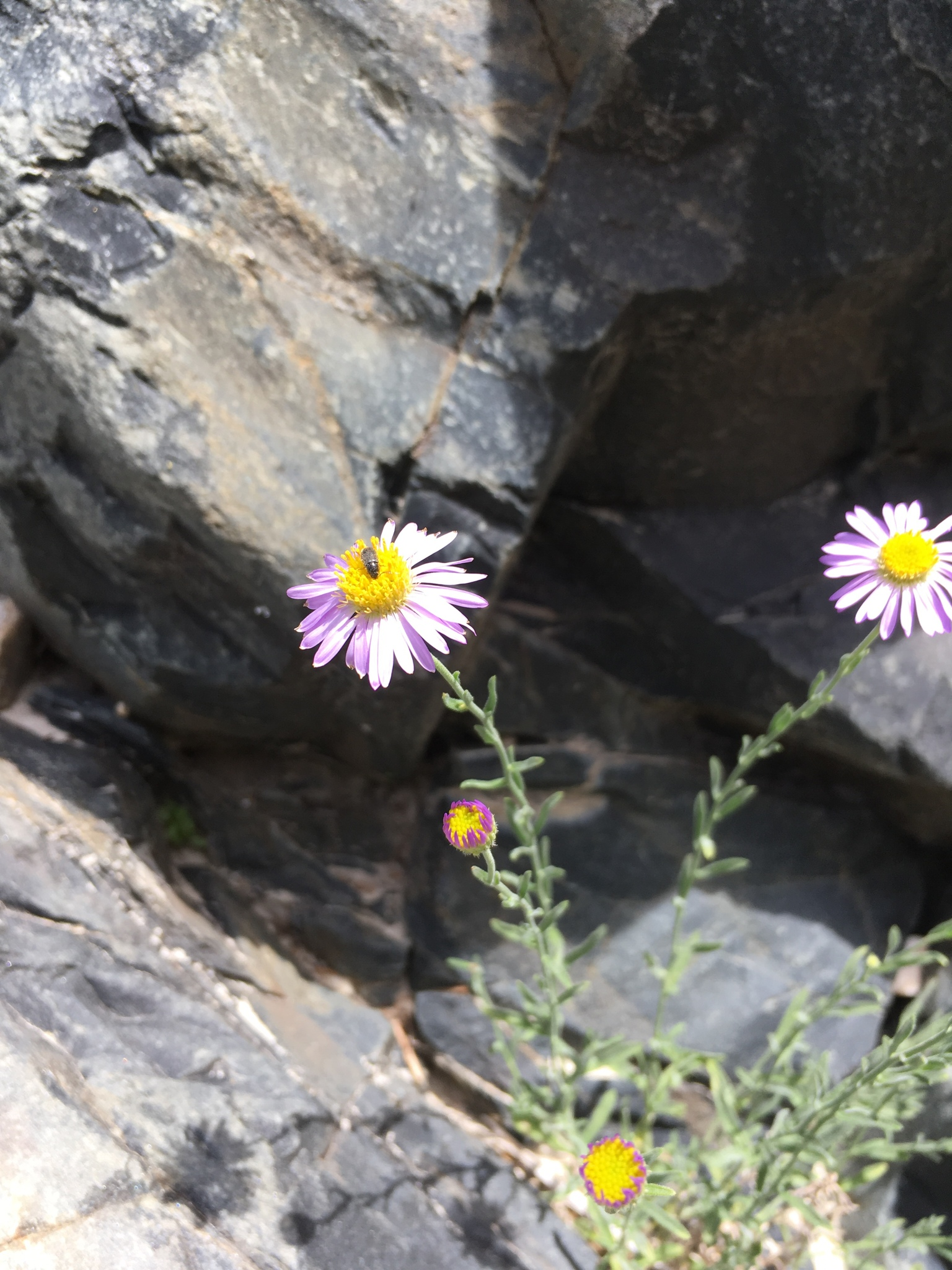
- In California

Scientific classification
- Kingdom: Plantae
- Clade: Tracheophytes
- Clade: Angiosperms
- Clade: Eudicots
- Clade: Asterids
- Order: Asterales
- Family: Asteraceae
- Genus: Erigeron
- Species: E. breweri

Binomial name
- Erigeron breweri A.Gray

Synonyms
- Erigeron covillei Greene, syn of var. covillei; Erigeron jacinteus H.M.Hall, syn of var. jacinteus; Erigeron petrocallis Greene, syn of var. porphyreticus; Erigeron porphyreticus M.E.Jones, syn of var. porphyreticus

= Erigeron breweri =

Species of flowering plant

Erigeron breweri is a North American species of flowering plants in the family Asteraceae known by the common name Brewer's fleabane.

Erigeron breweri is native to the western United States in the states of California and Nevada, where it grows in many varied habitats, from mountains to grassland and desert. It is a perennial herb reaching anywhere from 10 to 70 centimeters (4-28 inches) in height with evenly spaced small leaves along its hairy stems. The flower heads are around one centimeter (0.4 inches) wide with centers of golden yellow or greenish disc florets and most heads have a fringe of purple ray florets.

Varieties

- Erigeron breweri var. bisanctus G.Nesom - San Gabriel + San Bernardino Mountains
- Erigeron breweri var. breweri - Nevada, mountains of California (primarily Sierra Nevada) from Shasta County to San Bernardino County
- Erigeron breweri var. covillei (Greene) G.L.Nesom - southern California from Inyo County to San Diego County
- Erigeron breweri var. jacinteus (H.M.Hall) Cronquist - southern California from Kern County to Riverside County
- Erigeron breweri var. porphyreticus (M.E.Jones) Cronquist mountains of California from Alpine County to Riverside County
