= Erigeron acomanus =

Scientific classification
- Kingdom: Plantae
- Clade: Tracheophytes
- Clade: Angiosperms
- Clade: Eudicots
- Clade: Asterids
- Order: Asterales
- Family: Asteraceae
- Genus: Erigeron
- Species: E. acomanus

Binomial name
- Erigeron acomanus Spellenb. & P.Knight

Species of flowering plant

Erigeron acomanus is a rare North American species of flowering plant in the family Asteraceae known by the common names bluewater fleabane and Acoma fleabane. It has been found only in sandstone soils in west-central New Mexico.

== Description ==
Erigeron acomanus is a small perennial herb rarely more than 15 centimeters (6 inches) tall, spreading by means of underground rhizomes. Each plant generally produces only one flower head, with 16–30 white ray florets surrounding yellow disc florets.

The species is named for the Native American community called Acoma Pueblo in New Mexico.
