= Erigeron tenellus =

Scientific classification
- Kingdom: Plantae
- Clade: Tracheophytes
- Clade: Angiosperms
- Clade: Eudicots
- Clade: Asterids
- Order: Asterales
- Family: Asteraceae
- Genus: Erigeron
- Species: E. tenellus

Binomial name
- Erigeron tenellus DC.

Synonyms
- Erigeron tenellum DC.

Species of flowering plant

Erigeron tenellus is a North American species of flowering plant in the family Asteraceae known by the common name Río Grande fleabane. It is native to the valley of the Río Grande, on both sides of the international border. It is found in the US state of Texas as well as in Nuevo León and Tamaulipas in Mexico.

Erigeron tenellus grows in brushlands and in open woodlands dominated by palms. It is an annual herb up to 40 centimeters (16 inches) tall, producing a narrow taproot. The inflorescence is made up of 1-20 flower heads per stem, in a loose array. Each head contains 95–250 blue or white ray florets surrounding numerous yellow disc florets.
