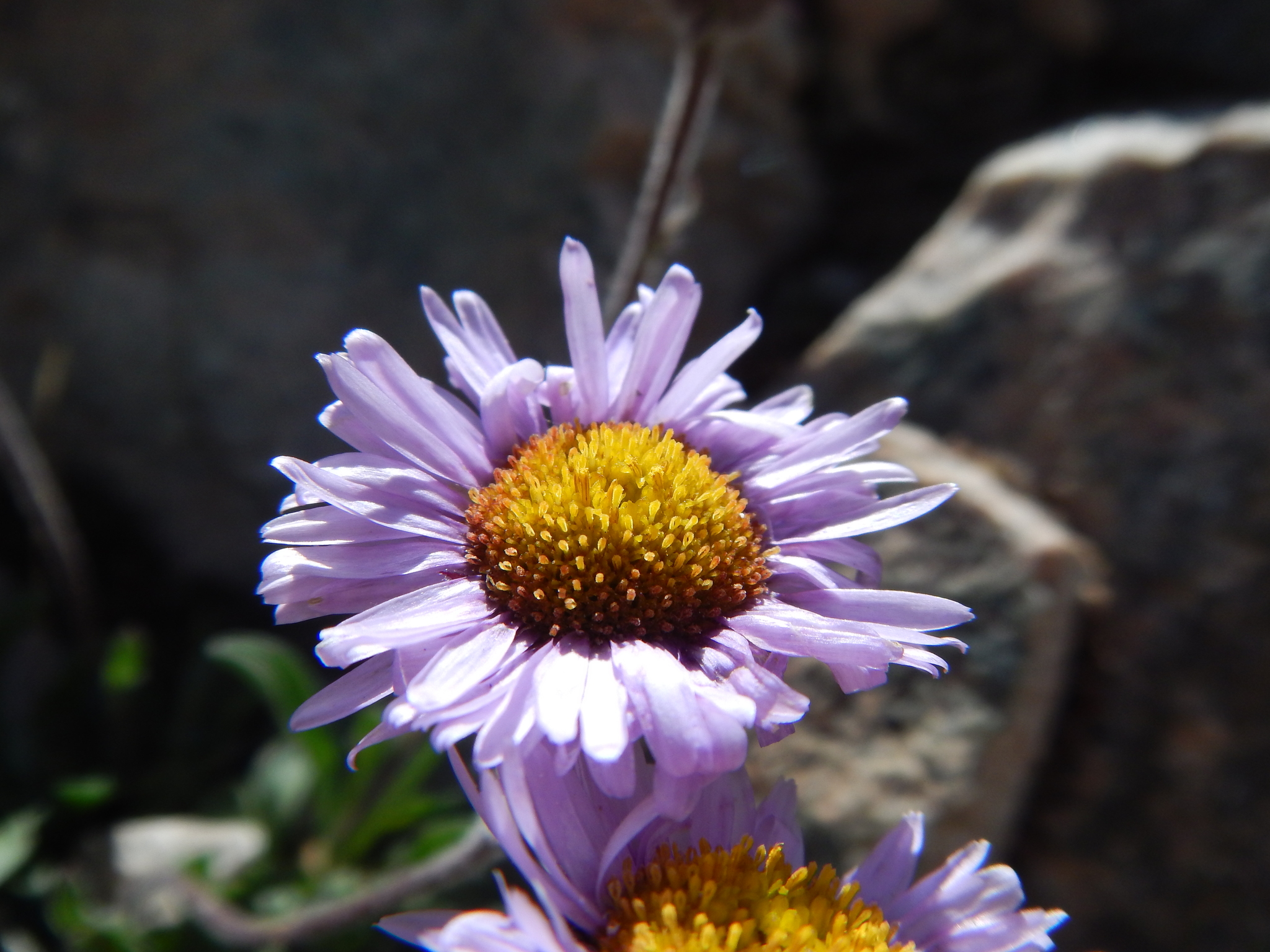

Conservation status
- Imperiled (NatureServe)

Scientific classification
- Kingdom: Plantae
- Clade: Tracheophytes
- Clade: Angiosperms
- Clade: Eudicots
- Clade: Asterids
- Order: Asterales
- Family: Asteraceae
- Genus: Erigeron
- Species: E. algidus

Binomial name
- Erigeron algidus Jeps.

Synonyms
- Erigeron petiolaris Greene 1912 not Vierh. 1906

= Erigeron algidus =

Species of flowering plant

Erigeron algidus is a species of flowering plant in the family Asteraceae known by the common name stalked fleabane.

Erigeron algidus is native to the High Sierra and nearby peaks in eastern California and western Nevada.Biota of north America Program 2014 county distribution map It is a resident of alpine plant communities such as talus slopes.

Erigeron algidus a daisy-like perennial with a basal clump of narrow fuzzy leaves and erect, naked stems to 30 centimeters (1 foot) in height. Atop each stem is a flower head one to one and a half centimeters (0.4-0.6 inches) wide with a yellow center of disc florets and an outer fringe of up to 125 ray florets in shades of bright purple, pink, or white. The rays spread straight out or reflex back from the center.
