= Erigeron nanus =

Scientific classification
- Kingdom: Plantae
- Clade: Tracheophytes
- Clade: Angiosperms
- Clade: Eudicots
- Clade: Asterids
- Order: Asterales
- Family: Asteraceae
- Genus: Erigeron
- Species: E. nanus

Binomial name
- Erigeron nanus Nutt.

Synonyms
- Erigeron nanum Nutt.

Species of flowering plant

Erigeron nanus is a North American species of flowering plant in the family Asteraceae known by the common name dwarf fleabane. It is native to the western part of the United States, in Wyoming, northern Utah, southern Idaho, and northeastern Nevada.

Erigeron nanus is a small perennial herb rarely more than 4 centimeters (1.6 inches) tall, producing a taproot. The leaves and the stem are covered with stiff hairs. The plant generally produces only one flower head per stem, each head with up to 35 blue or purple ray florets surrounding numerous yellow disc florets. The species grows on ridges, rocky slopes, and outcroppings.
