= Erigeron ovinus =

Conservation status
- Imperiled (NatureServe)

Scientific classification
- Kingdom: Plantae
- Clade: Tracheophytes
- Clade: Angiosperms
- Clade: Eudicots
- Clade: Asterids
- Order: Asterales
- Family: Asteraceae
- Genus: Erigeron
- Species: E. ovinus

Binomial name
- Erigeron ovinus Cronquist

Synonyms
- Erigeron caespitosus subsp. anactis S.F.Blake 1922

Species of flowering plant

Erigeron ovinus is a rare North American species of flowering plant in the family Asteraceae, called the sheep fleabane. It has been found only in the southeastern part of the US state of Nevada (Clark County + Lincoln County).

Erigeron ovinus is a perennial herb up to 15 centimeters (6 inches) tall, with a large taproot, forming clumps of many individuals close together. Leaves are pinnatifid with long narrow lobes. The plant generally produces one or two flower heads per stem, each head with numerous yellow disc florets but no ray florets. The species grows on ridges and in cracks in rocks in conifer woodlands.

The oldest name for this plant is Erigeron caespitosus subsp. anactis. Conquist in 1947 sought to raise this from subspecies to the level of species, but opted to forgo the common (but not mandatory) practice of using the subspecific epithet as a species epithet. He chose a new epithet instead, ovinus.
