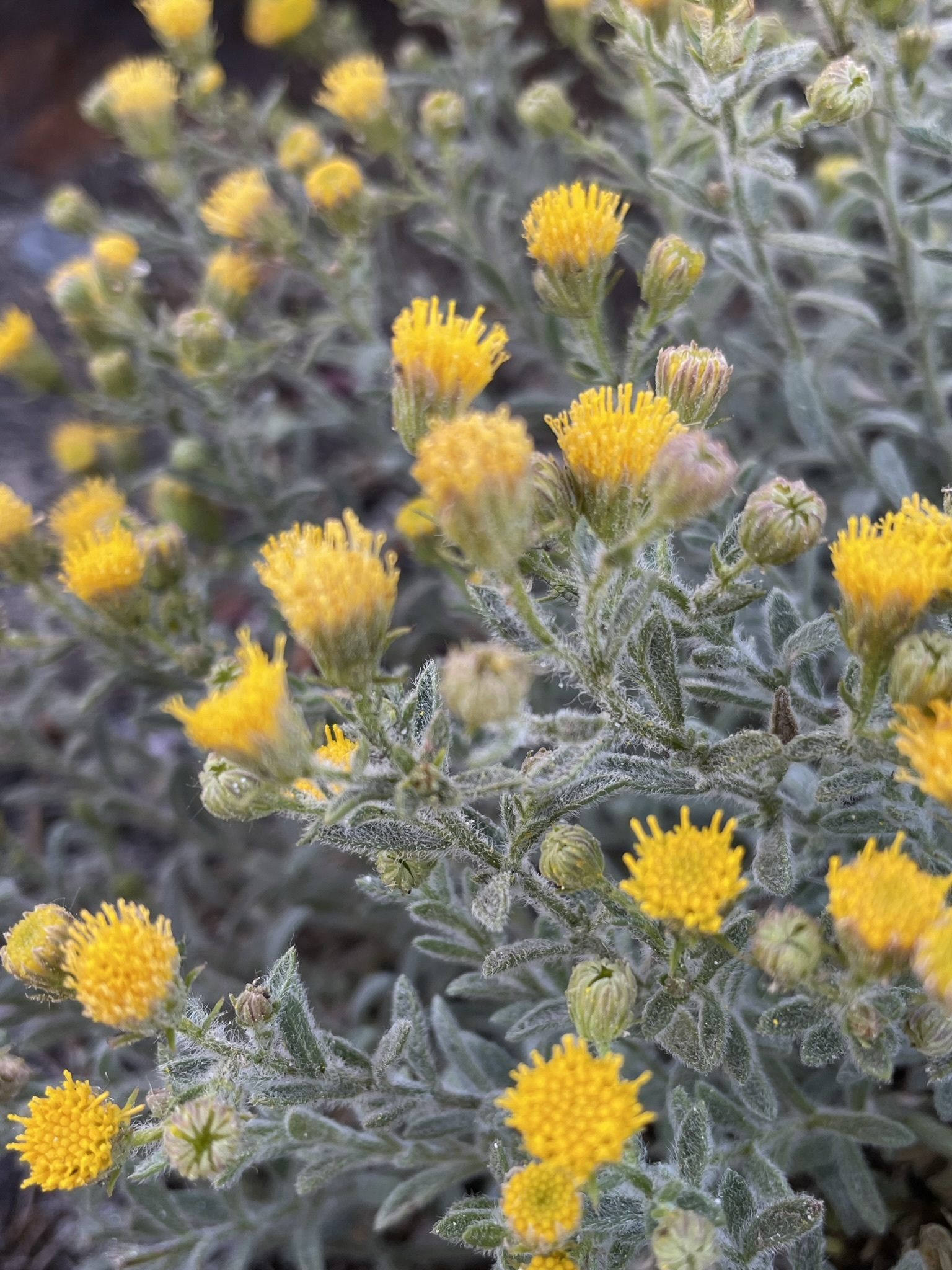

Scientific classification
- Kingdom: Plantae
- Clade: Tracheophytes
- Clade: Angiosperms
- Clade: Eudicots
- Clade: Asterids
- Order: Asterales
- Family: Asteraceae
- Genus: Erigeron
- Species: E. miser

Binomial name
- Erigeron miser A.Gray

= Erigeron miser =

Species of flowering plant

Erigeron miser is a species of flowering plant in the family Asteraceae known by the common names starved daisy or starved fleabane. It is endemic to California, where it is known only from the northern High Sierra Nevada.

Erigeron miser grows in rock crevices in coniferous forests and talus. It is a perennial herb producing several decumbent or erect stems up to about 25 centimeters (10 inches) long from a woody caudex. The plant is coated densely in long hairs. The small, narrow leaves are equal in size and evenly spaced along the stem. The inflorescence bears one or more flower heads on long erect peduncles, each lined with hairy, glandular phyllaries. The flower head contains many yellow disc florets but no ray florets. The fruit is an achene with a pappus of bristles.
