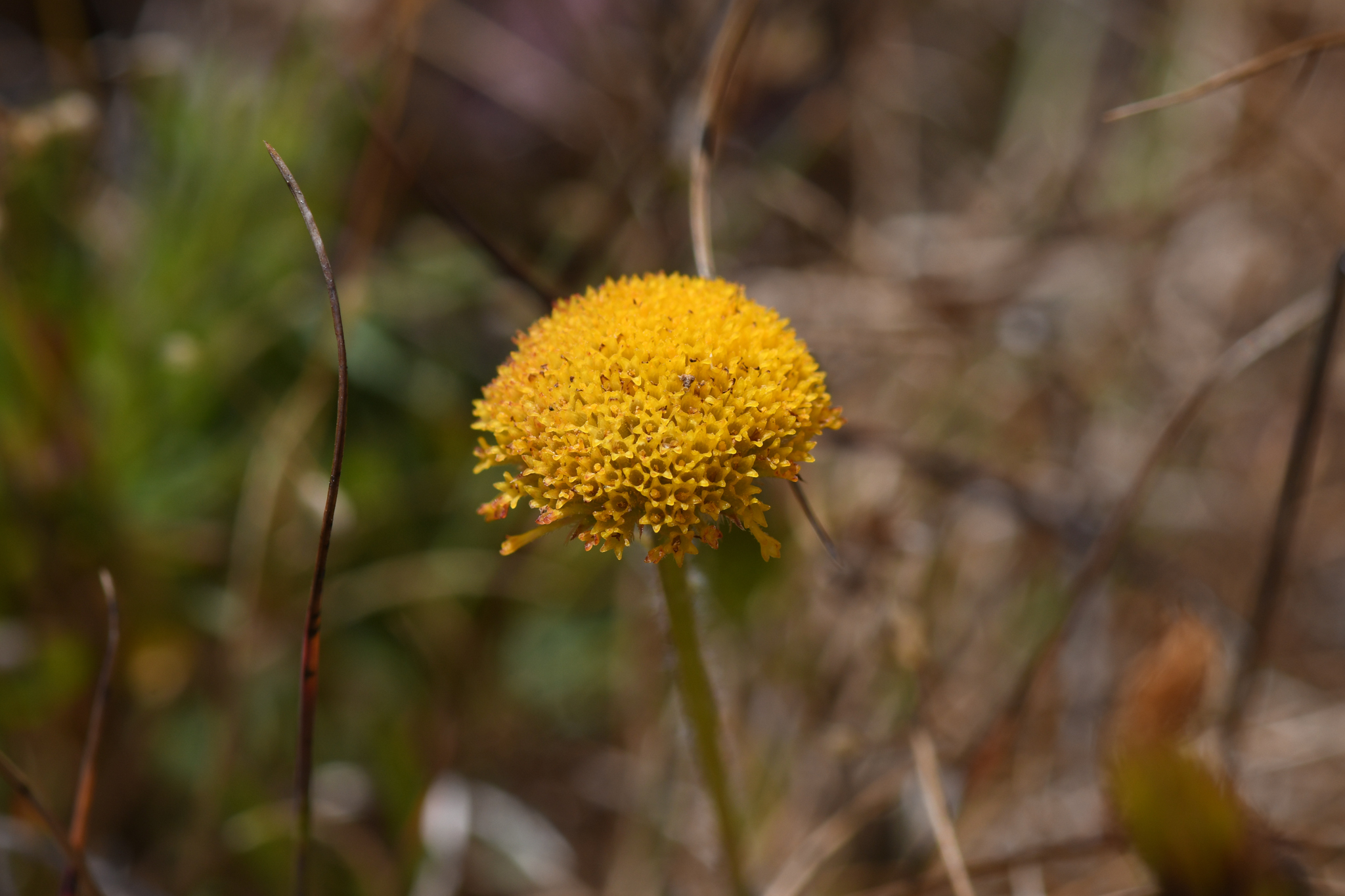

Conservation status
- Imperiled (NatureServe)

Scientific classification
- Kingdom: Plantae
- Clade: Tracheophytes
- Clade: Angiosperms
- Clade: Eudicots
- Clade: Asterids
- Order: Asterales
- Family: Asteraceae
- Genus: Erigeron
- Species: E. supplex

Binomial name
- Erigeron supplex Gray

= Erigeron supplex =

Species of flowering plant

Erigeron supplex is a rare species of flowering plant in the family Asteraceae known by the common names supple daisy or supple fleabane. It grows along the coastline and in the Coast Ranges in California, north of San Francisco Bay. It probably remains only in Sonoma and Marin Counties. There is a report of it growing well inland in Shasta County, but this is from a farm and probably a cultivated specimen.

Erigeron supplex grows in the scrub of coastal bluffs and grasslands. This is a perennial herb producing an unbranched, hairy, erect stem up to 40 centimeters (16 inches) tall. It is surrounded at the base by oval-shaped leaves several centimeters long. The inflorescence is generally a single flower head one or two centimeters (0.4–0.8 inches) wide containing yellow disc florets but no ray florets. The fruit is an achene with a pappus of bristles.
