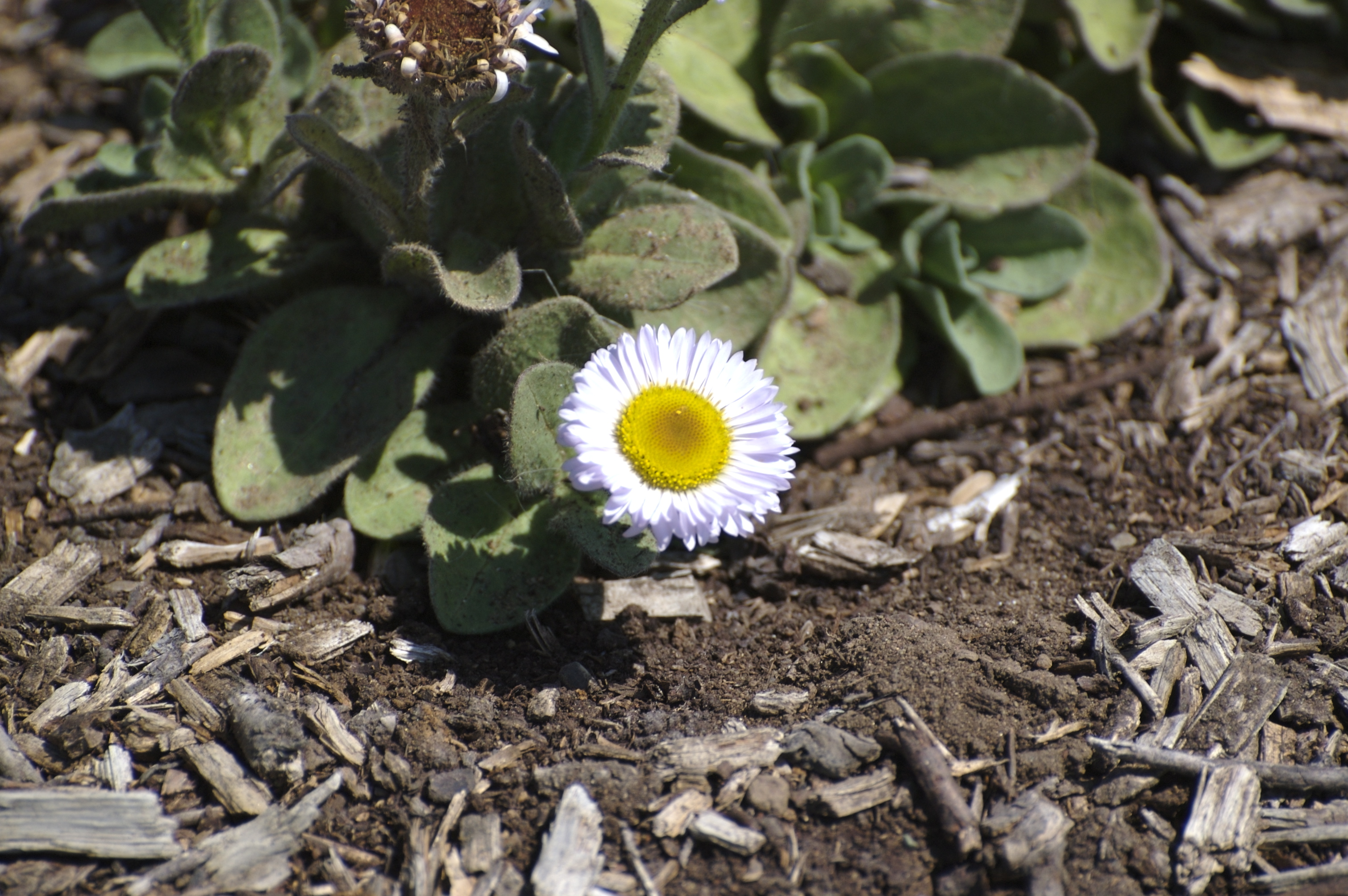

Conservation status
- Imperiled (NatureServe)

Scientific classification
- Kingdom: Plantae
- Clade: Tracheophytes
- Clade: Angiosperms
- Clade: Eudicots
- Clade: Asterids
- Order: Asterales
- Family: Asteraceae
- Genus: Erigeron
- Species: E. blochmaniae

Binomial name
- Erigeron blochmaniae Greene

= Erigeron blochmaniae =

Species of flowering plant

Erigeron blochmaniae is a species of flowering plant in the family Asteraceae known by the common names Blochman's erigeron and Blochman's leafy daisy.

Erigeron blochmaniae is endemic to California, where it is limited to the coastline of San Luis Obispo and northern Santa Barbara Counties. It lives in sand dunes and coastal hillsides, habitat which is currently declining as it is claimed for development.

Erigeron blochmaniae is a perennial herb growing from a stout woody caudex or rhizome and reaching heights of 40 to 80 centimeters (16-32 inches). Its stem is lined with evenly spaced narrow straight leaves, each one to three centimeters (0.4-1.2 inches) long. Atop each hairy stem is an inflorescence, with flower heads each just over a centimeter (0.4 inches) wide bearing light blue, lavender, or white ray florets surrounding golden yellow or greenish disc florets.
