= Erigeron salmonensis =

Scientific classification
- Kingdom: Plantae
- Clade: Embryophytes
- Clade: Tracheophytes
- Clade: Spermatophytes
- Clade: Angiosperms
- Clade: Eudicots
- Clade: Asterids
- Order: Asterales
- Family: Asteraceae
- Genus: Erigeron
- Species: E. salmonensis

Binomial name
- Erigeron salmonensis Brunsfeld & G.L.Nesom

Species of flowering plant

Erigeron salmonensis is a rare North American species of flowering plant in the family Asteraceae known by the common name Salmon River fleabane. It has been found only in the Salmon River Canyon in central Idaho, United States.

Erigeron salmonensis grows on ledges and cracks in north-facing cliffs. It is a perennial herb that can reach up to 35 cm (14 inches) tall, forming a woody underground caudex. The inflorescence generally contains only 1 to 3 flower heads per stem. Each head contains 11 to 15 white ray florets surrounding many yellow disc florets.
