= Erigeron jonesii =

Scientific classification
- Kingdom: Plantae
- Clade: Tracheophytes
- Clade: Angiosperms
- Clade: Eudicots
- Clade: Asterids
- Order: Asterales
- Family: Asteraceae
- Genus: Erigeron
- Species: E. jonesii

Binomial name
- Erigeron jonesii Cronquist

Synonyms
- Erigeron wahwahensis S.L.Welsh

Species of flowering plant

Erigeron jonesii is a North American species of flowering plant in the family Asteraceae, commonly known as Jones's fleabane. It is found primarily in Nevada and Utah, with a few populations in southern Idaho.

Erigeron jonesii is a branching perennial herb, growing up to 40cm (16 inches) tall, and formas a large taproot. Each branch can produce 1-4 flower heads, each with up to 52 white or blue ray florets surrounding numerous yellow disc florets.
