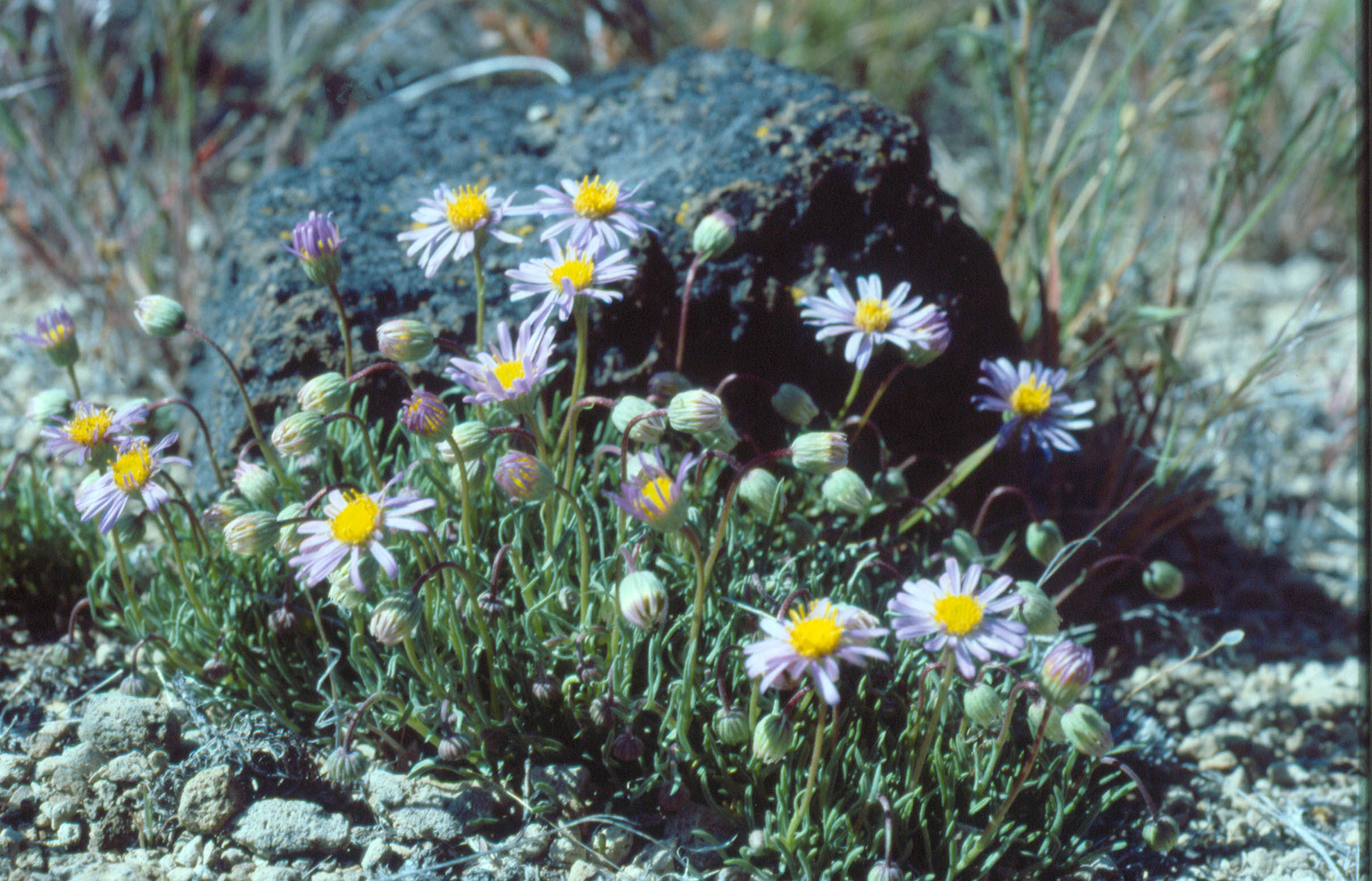

Scientific classification
- Kingdom: Plantae
- Clade: Tracheophytes
- Clade: Angiosperms
- Clade: Eudicots
- Clade: Asterids
- Order: Asterales
- Family: Asteraceae
- Genus: Erigeron
- Species: E. elegantulus

Binomial name
- Erigeron elegantulus Greene

= Erigeron elegantulus =

Species of flowering plant

Erigeron elegantulus is a North American species of flowering plants in the family Asteraceae known by the common names blue dwarf fleabane and volcanic daisy.

Erigeron elegantulus is an uncommon plant native to the Modoc Plateau and nearby areas in northeastern California and in eastern and southern Oregon.

Erigeron elegantulus grows on the rocky volcanic soils of the region. It is a small perennial herb forming patches of narrow, hard, pointed leaves a few centimeters long in shades of green to white. The erect stems are up to 15 centimeters (8 inches) in height and each hold a single flower head less than a centimeter (0.4 inches) wide. The head has a center of yellow disc florets and a fringe of 20-25 ray florets which may be blue, purple, or pink.
