= Erigeron nematophyllus =

Conservation status
- Vulnerable (NatureServe)

Scientific classification
- Kingdom: Plantae
- Clade: Tracheophytes
- Clade: Angiosperms
- Clade: Eudicots
- Clade: Asterids
- Order: Asterales
- Family: Asteraceae
- Genus: Erigeron
- Species: E. nematophyllus

Binomial name
- Erigeron nematophyllus Rydb.

Species of flowering plant

Erigeron nematophyllus is a North American species of flowering plant in the family Asteraceae known by the common name needle-leaf fleabane. It native to the western part of the United States, in Utah, Colorado, and Wyoming.

Erigeron nematophyllus is a small perennial herb rarely more than 18 centimeters (7.2 inches) tall, producing a taproot. The leaves are very narrow and thread-like or needle-like. The plant generally produces only 1-3 flower head per stem, each head with up to 55 white or pink ray florets surrounding numerous yellow disc florets. The species grows on sandy or rocky soil in sagebrush flats or conifer woodlands.
