= List of Asterales of Montana =

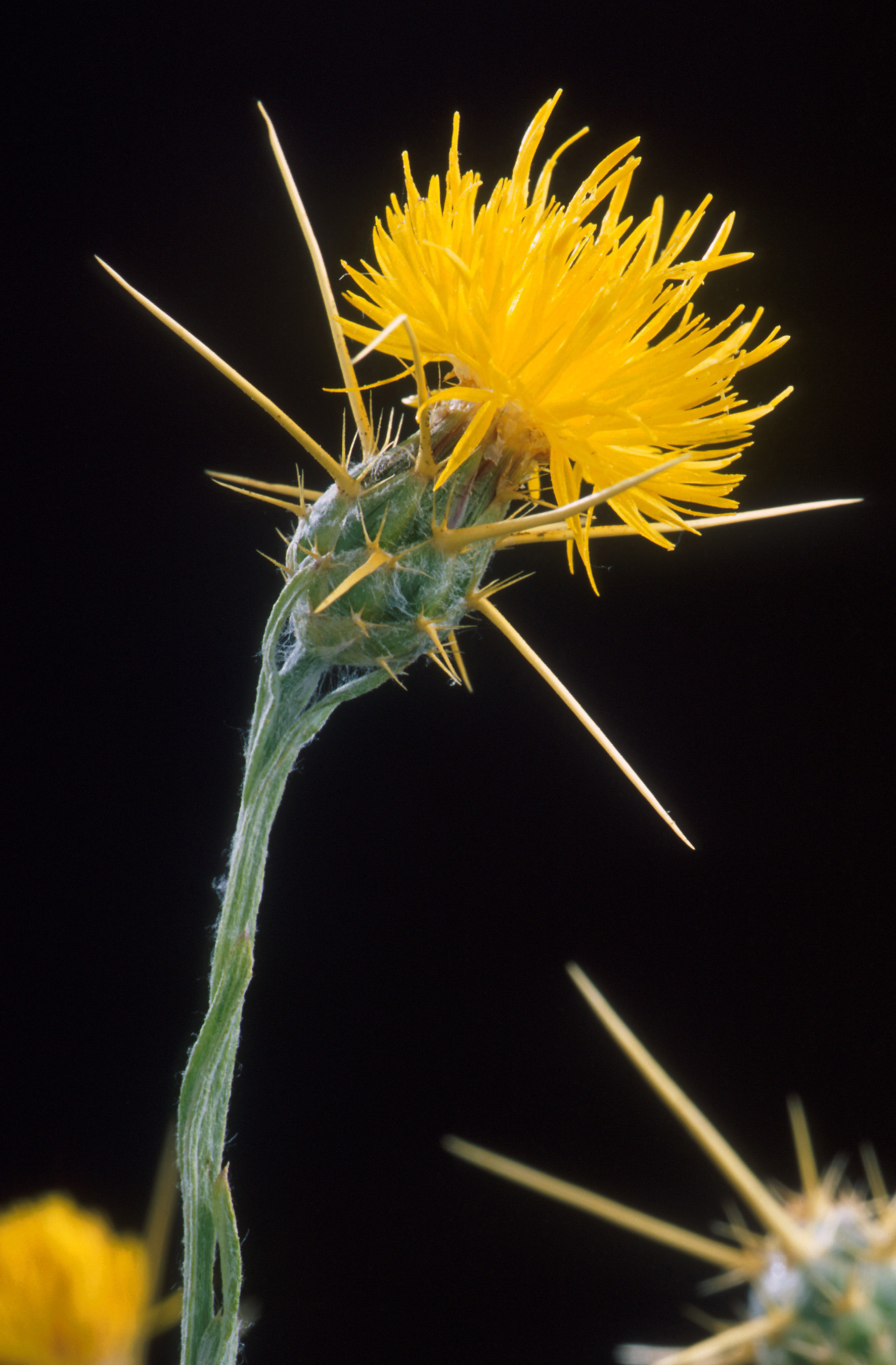
Yellow starthistle

There are at least 445 members of the aster and sunflower order, Asterales, found in Montana. Some of these species are exotics (not native to Montana) and some species have been designated as Species of Concern.

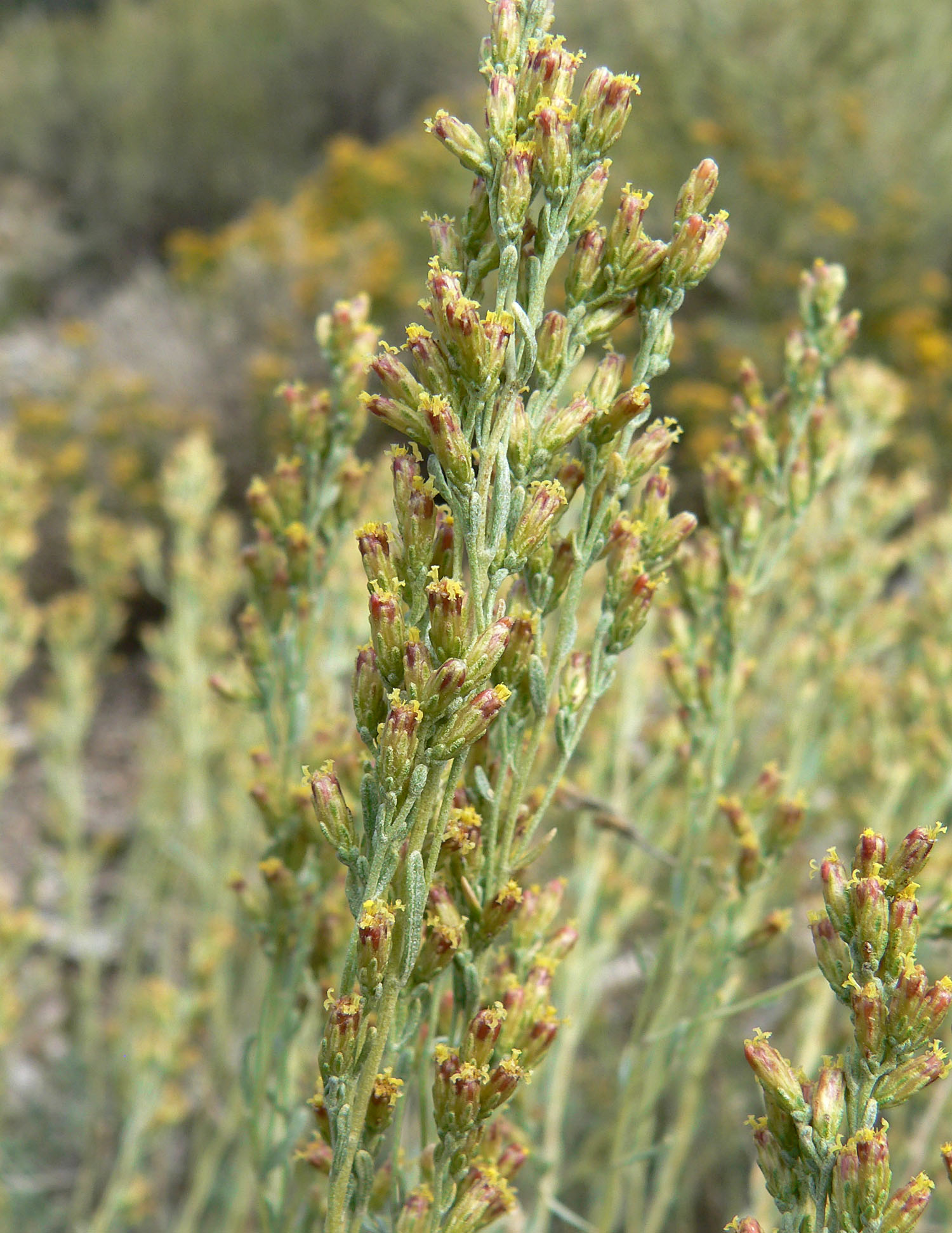
Black sagebrush

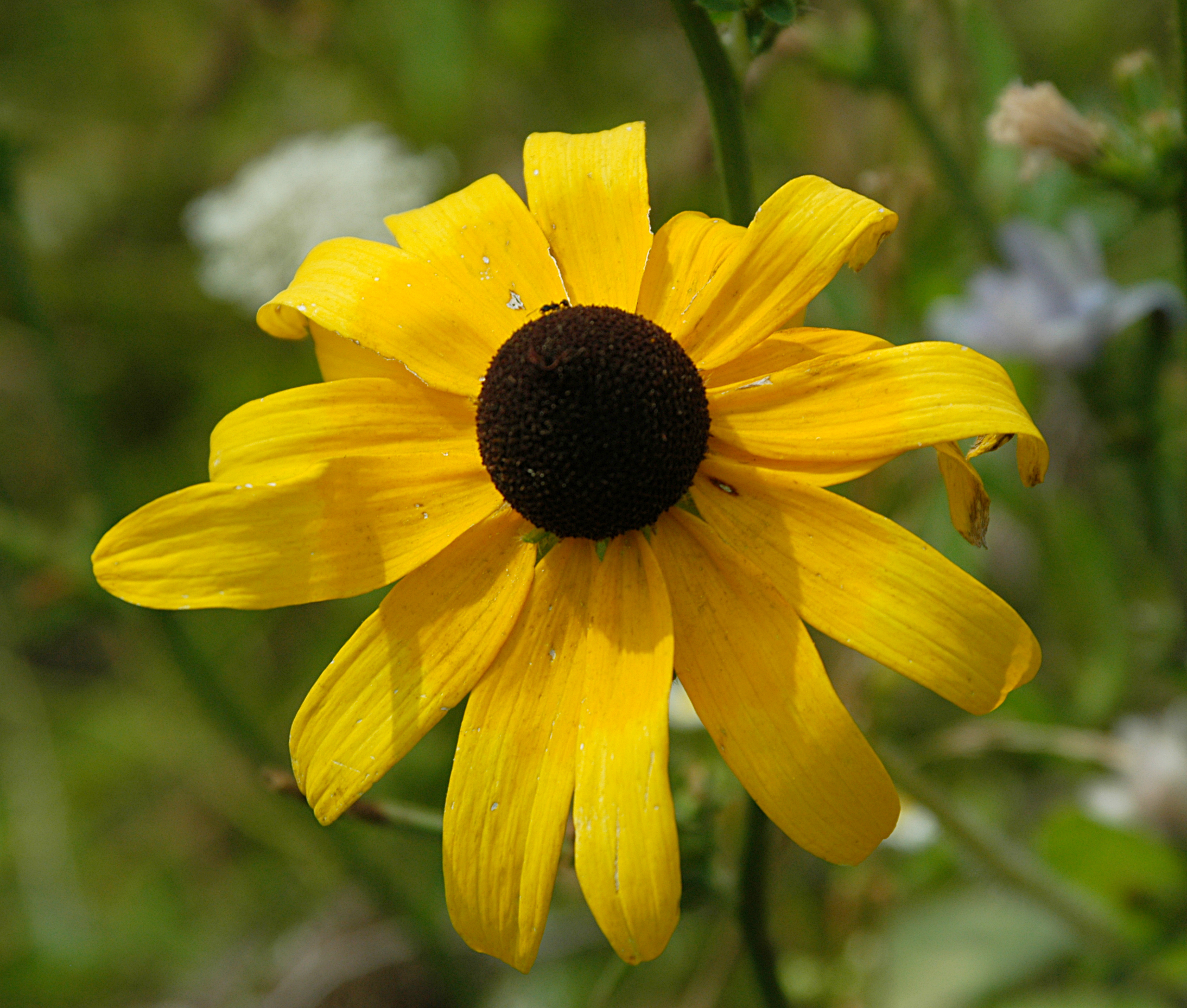
Black-eyed Susan

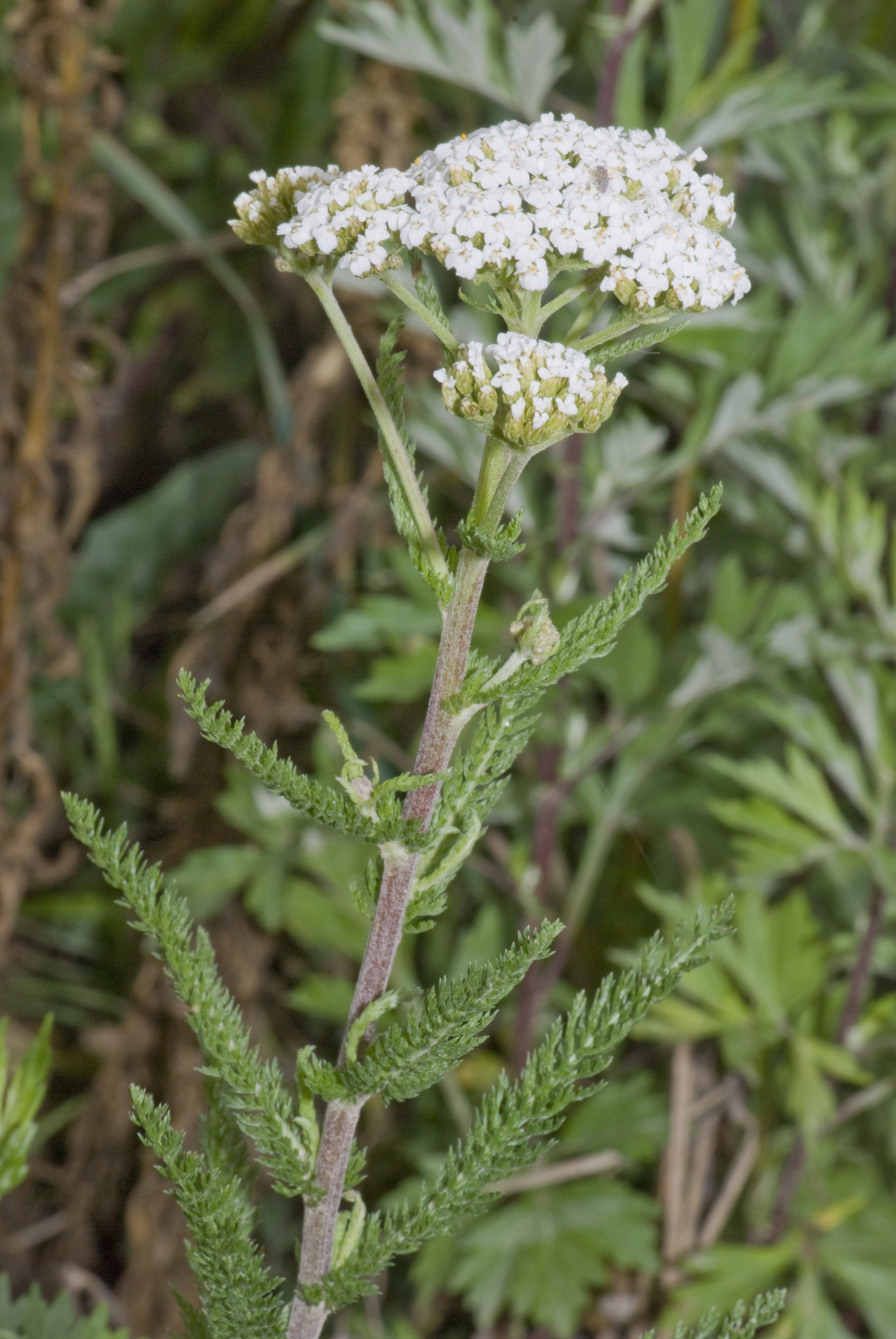
Common yarrow

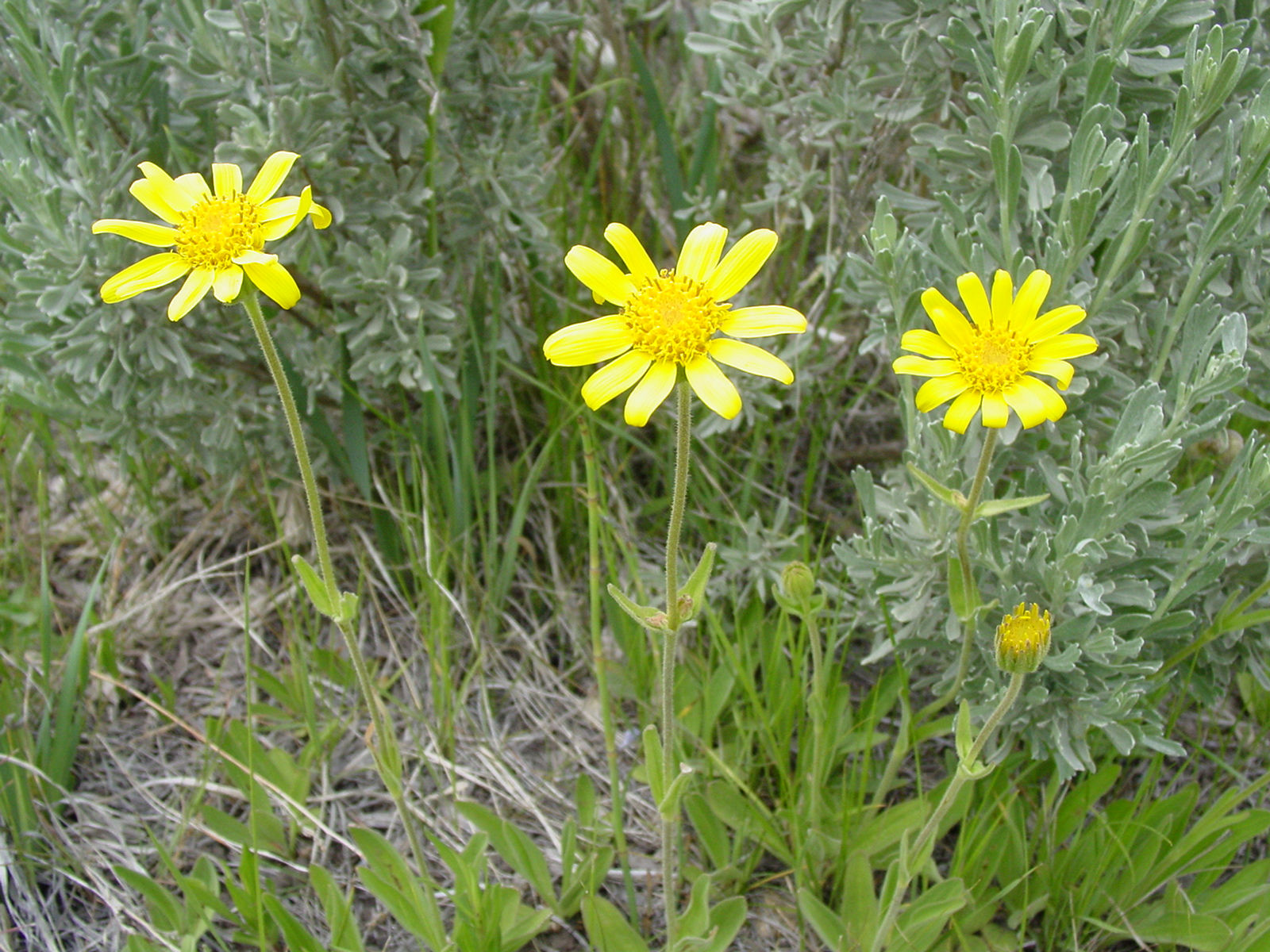
Twin arnica

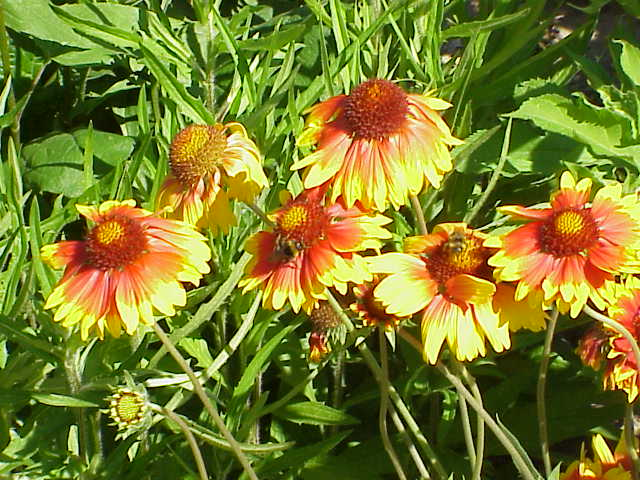
Great blanket-flower

- Achillea millefolium, common yarrow
- Achillea nobilis, noble yarrow
- Achillea ptarmica, sneezeweed
- Acroptilon repens, Russian knapweed
- Adenocaulon bicolor, American trailplant
- Ageratina occidentalis, western boneset
- Agoseris aurantiaca, orange agoseris
- Agoseris glauca, pale agoseris
- Agoseris glauca var. dasycephala, pale agoseris
- Agoseris glauca var. glauca, pale agoseris
- Agoseris grandiflora, large-flower agoseris
- Agoseris heterophylla, annual agoseris
- Agoseris lackschewitzii, pink agoseris
- Agoseris parviflora, steppe agoseris
- Almutaster pauciflorus, alkali marsh aster
- Ambrosia acanthicarpa, flat-spine bursage
- Ambrosia artemisiifolia, annual ragweed
- Ambrosia psilostachya, naked-spike ambrosia
- Ambrosia tomentosa, skeleton-leaf bursage
- Ambrosia trifida, great ragweed
- Anaphalis margaritacea, pearly everlasting
- Antennaria alpina, alpine pussytoes
- Antennaria anaphaloides, tall pussytoes
- Antennaria aromatica, aromatic pussytoes
- Antennaria corymbosa, meadow pussytoes
- Antennaria densifolia, dense-leaved pussytoes
- Antennaria dimorpha, low pussytoes
- Antennaria howellii, Howell's pussytoes
- Antennaria lanata, woolly pussytoes
- Antennaria luzuloides, rush pussytoes
- Antennaria media, rocky mountain pussytoes
- Antennaria microphylla, littleleaf pussytoes
- Antennaria monocephala, single-head pussytoes
- Antennaria neglecta, field pussytoes
- Antennaria parvifolia, Nuttall's pussytoes
- Antennaria pulcherrima, showy pussytoes
- Antennaria racemosa, racemose pussytoes
- Antennaria rosea, rosy pussytoes
- Antennaria umbrinella, umber pussytoes
- Anthemis arvensis, corn camomile
- Anthemis cotula, mayweed
- Anthemis tinctoria, golden camomile
- Arctium lappa, greater burdock
- Arctium minus, lesser burdock
- Arnica amplexicaulis, stream-bank arnica
- Arnica angustifolia, narrowleaf arnica
- Arnica chamissonis, leafy arnica
- Arnica cordifolia, heart-leaved arnica
- Arnica fulgens, hillside arnica
- Arnica latifolia, mountain arnica
- Arnica latifolia var. gracilis, smallhead arnica
- Arnica longifolia, long-leaf arnica
- Arnica mollis, hairy arnica
- Arnica parryi, nodding arnica
- Arnica rydbergii, subalpine arnica
- Arnica sororia, twin arnica
- Arnica × diversifolia, rayless arnica
- Artemisia absinthium, common wormwood
- Artemisia annua, annual wormwood
- Artemisia arbuscula, dwarf sagebrush
- Artemisia biennis, biennial wormwood
- Artemisia campestris, field sagewort
- Artemisia campestris subsp. borealis, boreal field sagewort
- Artemisia campestris subsp. caudata, field sagewort
- Artemisia cana, silver sagebrush
- Artemisia cana subsp. cana, silver sagebrush
- Artemisia cana subsp. viscidula, silver sagebrush
- Artemisia dracunculus, tarragon
- Artemisia frigida, fringed sage
- Artemisia lindleyana, Columbia River wormwood
- Artemisia longifolia, longleaf wormwood
- Artemisia longiloba, alkali sagebrush
- Artemisia ludoviciana, white sagebrush
- Artemisia ludoviciana subsp. candicans, white sagebrush
- Artemisia ludoviciana subsp. incompta, white sagebrush
- Artemisia ludoviciana subsp. ludoviciana, white sagebrush
- Artemisia michauxiana, Michaux's wormwood
- Artemisia norvegica, boreal wormwood
- Artemisia nova, black sagebrush
- Artemisia pedatifida, bird's-foot sagebrush
- Artemisia rigida, scabland sagebrush
- Artemisia scopulorum, alpine sagebrush
- Artemisia spinescens, budsage
- Artemisia tilesii, Tilesius wormwood
- Artemisia tridentata, big sagebrush
- Artemisia tridentata subsp. tridentata, basin big sagebrush
- Artemisia tridentata subsp. vaseyana, mountain big sagebrush
- Artemisia tridentata subsp. wyomingensis, Wyoming big sagebrush
- Artemisia tripartita, three-tip sagebrush
- Artemisia tripartita subsp. rupicola, Wyoming threetip sagebrush
- Artemisia tripartita subsp. tripartita, threetip sagebrush
- Balsamorhiza hookeri, Hooker's balsamroot
- Balsamorhiza incana, hoary balsamroot
- Balsamorhiza macrophylla, large-leaved balsamroot
- Balsamorhiza sagittata, arrowleaf balsamroot
- Bellis perennis, lawn daisy
- Bidens beckii, beck water-marigold
- Bidens cernua, nodding beggarticks
- Bidens comosa, three-lobe beggarticks
- Bidens frondosa, devil's beggarticks
- Bidens vulgata, tall bur-marigold
- Brickellia eupatorioides, thoroughwort brickellbush
- Brickellia grandiflora, tasselflower brickellbush
- Brickellia oblongifolia, mojave brickellbush
- Canadanthus modestus, great northern aster
- Carduus acanthoides, spiny plumeless-thistle
- Carduus nutans, musk thistle
- Centaurea cyanus, garden cornflower
- Centaurea diffusa, diffuse knapweed
- Centaurea jacea, brown starthistle
- Centaurea montana, mountain starthistle
- Centaurea nigra, black starthistle
- Centaurea scabiosa, great starthistle
- Centaurea solstitialis, yellow starthistle
- Centaurea stoebe, spotted knapweed
- Centaurea virgata, squarrose knapweed
- Chaenactis alpina, hoary pincushion
- Chaenactis douglasii, dusty maiden
- Chondrilla juncea, rush skeletonweed
- Chrysothamnus viscidiflorus, sticky-leaf rabbitbrush
- Cichorium intybus, chicory
- Cirsium arvense, Canada thistle
- Cirsium brevistylum, short-styled thistle
- Cirsium canescens, prairie thistle
- Cirsium canovirens, gray green thistle
- Cirsium eatonii, Eaton's thistle
- Cirsium flodmanii, Flodman's thistle
- Cirsium foliosum, leafy thistle
- Cirsium hookerianum, hooker thistle
- Cirsium longistylum, long-styled thistle
- Cirsium pulcherrimum, Wyoming thistle
- Cirsium scariosum, meadow thistle
- Cirsium subniveum, Jackson Hole thistle
- Cirsium undulatum, wavyleaf thistle
- Cirsium vulgare, bull thistle
- Conyza canadensis, Canada horseweed
- Coreopsis tinctoria, golden tickseed
- Crepis acuminata, longleaf hawk's-beard
- Crepis atribarba, slender hawksbeard
- Crepis elegans, elegant hawk's-beard
- Crepis intermedia, small-flower hawk's-beard
- Crepis modocensis, siskiyou hawk's-beard
- Crepis nana, dwarf alpine hawk's-beard
- Crepis nicaeensis, Turkish hawksbeard
- Crepis occidentalis, gray hawk's-beard
- Crepis runcinata, naked-stem hawk's-beard
- Crepis runcinata subsp. glauca, fiddleleaf hawksbeard
- Crepis runcinata subsp. hispidulosa, fiddleleaf hawksbeard
- Crepis runcinata subsp. runcinata, fiddleleaf hawksbeard
- Crepis setosa, bristly hawk's-beard
- Crepis tectorum, narrowleaf hawk's-beard
- Dyssodia papposa, fetid dogweed
- Echinacea angustifolia, narrow-leaved purple coneflower
- Ericameria discoidea, whitestem goldenbush
- Ericameria discoidea var. discoidea, whitestem goldenbush
- Ericameria discoidea var. linearis, linear-leaved whitestem goldenbush
- Ericameria nana, dwarf goldenweed
- Ericameria nauseosa, rubber rabbitbrush
- Ericameria parryi, Parry's rabbitbrush
- Ericameria parryi var. montana, Parry's mountain rabbitbrush
- Ericameria suffruticosa, single-head goldenweed
- Erigeron acris, bitter fleabane
- Erigeron acris subsp. debilis, bitter fleabane
- Erigeron acris subsp. kamtschaticus, bitter fleabane
- Erigeron allocotus, Bighorn fleabane
- Erigeron asperugineus, Idaho fleabane
- Erigeron caespitosus, caespitose fleabane
- Erigeron compositus, cutleaf fleabane
- Erigeron corymbosus, longleaf fleabane
- Erigeron coulteri, Coulter fleabane
- Erigeron divergens, spreading fleabane
- Erigeron eatonii, Eaton's fleabane
- Erigeron evermannii, Evermann fleabane
- Erigeron filifolius, threadleaf fleabane
- Erigeron flabellifolius, fan-leaved fleabane
- Erigeron flagellaris, running fleabane
- Erigeron formosissimus, beautiful fleabane
- Erigeron glabellus, smooth fleabane
- Erigeron glabellus var. glabellus, streamside fleabane
- Erigeron glabellus var. pubescens, streamside fleabane
- Erigeron gracilis, slender fleabane
- Erigeron grandiflorus, large-flower fleabane
- Erigeron humilis, low fleabane
- Erigeron lackschewitzii, Lackschewitz' fleabane
- Erigeron lanatus, woolly fleabane
- Erigeron leiomerus, smooth fleabane
- Erigeron linearis, linear-leaf fleabane
- Erigeron lonchophyllus, short-ray fleabane
- Erigeron ochroleucus, buff fleabane
- Erigeron ochroleucus var. ochroleucus, buff fleabane
- Erigeron ochroleucus var. scribneri, buff fleabane
- Erigeron parryi, Parry's fleabane
- Erigeron peregrinus, subalpine fleabane
- Erigeron philadelphicus, Philadelphia fleabane
- Erigeron pumilus, shaggy fleabane
- Erigeron radicatus, taprooted fleabane
- Erigeron rydbergii, Rydberg's fleabane
- Erigeron simplex, one-stem fleabane
- Erigeron speciosus, aspen fleabane
- Erigeron strigosus, daisy fleabane
- Erigeron subtrinervis, three-nerve fleabane
- Erigeron tener, slender fleabane
- Erigeron tweedyi, tweedy's fleabane
- Erigeron ursinus, bear river fleabane
- Eriophyllum lanatum, common woolly-sunflower
- Eriophyllum lanatum var. integrifolium, common woolly sunflower
- Eriophyllum lanatum var. lanatum, common woolly-sunflower
- Eucephalus elegans, elegant aster
- Eucephalus engelmannii, Engelmann's aster
- Eupatorium maculatum, spotted joepye-weed
- Eupatorium occidentale, western joepye-weed
- Eurybia conspicua, showy aster
- Eurybia glauca, gray aster
- Eurybia integrifolia, thick-stem aster
- Eurybia merita, subalpine aster
- Eurybia sibirica, arctic aster
- Euthamia graminifolia, flat-top fragrant goldenrod
- Euthamia occidentalis, western fragrant goldenrod
- Evax prolifera, big-head evax
- Filago arvensis, field fluffweed
- Gaillardia aristata, great blanket-flower
- Galinsoga quadriradiata, fringed quickweed
- Gnaphalium macounii, Macoun's cudweed
- Gnaphalium microcephalum, white cudweed
- Gnaphalium palustre, western marsh cudweed
- Gnaphalium purpureum, purple cudweed
- Gnaphalium stramineum, cotton-batting cudweed
- Gnaphalium uliginosum, low cudweed
- Grindelia howellii, Howell's gumweed
- Grindelia nana, Idaho gumweed
- Grindelia squarrosa, curlycup gumweed
- Gutierrezia sarothrae, broom snakeweed
- Helenium autumnale, common sneezeweed
- Helenium hoopesii, orange sneezeweed
- Helianthella quinquenervis, nodding rockrose
- Helianthella uniflora, Rocky Mountain rockrose
- Helianthus annuus, common sunflower
- Helianthus maximiliani, Maximillian sunflower
- Helianthus nuttallii, Nuttall's sunflower
- Helianthus pauciflorus, stiff sunflower
- Helianthus petiolaris, prairie sunflower
- Helianthus × laetiflorus, hybrid prairie sunflower
- Heterotheca villosa, hairy golden-aster
- Heterotheca villosa var. depressa, low golden aster
- Heterotheca villosa var. foliosa, hairy false goldenaster
- Heterotheca villosa var. minor, hairy false goldenaster
- Heterotheca villosa var. villosa, hairy false goldenaster
- Hieracium albiflorum, white-flower hawkweed
- Hieracium aurantiacum, orange hawkweed
- Hieracium caespitosum, meadow hawkweed
- Hieracium gracile, alpine hawkweed
- Hieracium praealtum, kingdevil
- Hieracium scouleri, Scouler's hawkweed
- Hieracium scouleri var. albertinum, Albert's hawkweed
- Hieracium scouleri var. griseum, hound's-tongue hawkweed
- Hieracium scouleri var. scouleri, Scouler's hawkweed
- Hieracium umbellatum, narrowleaf hawkweed
- Hulsea algida, alpine hulsea
- Hymenopappus filifolius, fine-leaved hymenopappus
- Hymenopappus filifolius var. luteus, yellowish hymenopappus
- Hymenopappus filifolius var. polycephalus, manyhead hymenopappus
- Hymenoxys acaulis, stemless four-nerve-daisy
- Hymenoxys grandiflora, old-man-of-the-mountain
- Hymenoxys richardsonii, Richardson's bitterweed
- Hymenoxys torreyana, Torrey bitterweed
- Hypochaeris radicata, hairy cat's-ear
- Ionactis alpina, lava aster
- Ionactis stenomeres, Rocky Mountain aster
- Iva axillaris, small-flowered marsh-elder
- Iva xanthifolia, coarse sumpweed
- Lactuca biennis, tall blue lettuce
- Lactuca canadensis, Canada lettuce
- Lactuca ludoviciana, western lettuce
- Lactuca serriola, prickly lettuce
- Lactuca tatarica, tartarian lettuce
- Lagophylla ramosissima, slender hareleaf
- Lapsana communis, common nipplewort
- Leucanthemum vulgare, oxeye daisy
- Liatris ligulistylis, Rocky Mountain blazing star
- Liatris punctata, dotted blazing star
- Lorandersonia linifolia, spearleaf rabbitbrush
- Lygodesmia juncea, rush skeleton-plant
- Machaeranthera canescens, hoary tansy-aster
- Machaeranthera grindelioides, rayless tansy-aster
- Machaeranthera pinnatifida, spiny goldenaster
- Machaeranthera tanacetifolia, tansyleaf tansy-aster
- Madia exigua, little tarweed
- Madia glomerata, mountain tarweed
- Madia gracilis, grassy tarweed
- Madia minima, small-headed tarweed
- Malacothrix torreyi, desert dandelion
- Matricaria discoidea, pineapple-weed chamomile
- Matricaria maritima, false chamomile
- Microseris nutans, nodding microseris
- Nothocalais cuspidata, prairie false-dandelion
- Nothocalais nigrescens, black hairy false-dandelion
- Nothocalais troximoides, sagebrush false dandelion
- Onopordum acanthium, scotch thistle
- Oreostemma alpigenum, anderson's aster
- Petasites frigidus, arctic sweet coltsfoot
- Petasites frigidus var. frigidus, arctic sweet coltsfoot
- Petasites frigidus var. sagittatus, arrowleaf sweet coltsfoot
- Picradeniopsis oppositifolia, oppositeleaf false bahia
- Platyschkuhria integrifolia, basin daisy
- Pleiacanthus spinosus, spiny skeletonweed
- Prenanthes racemosa, glaucous rattlesnake-root
- Prenanthes sagittata, arrow-leaf rattlesnake-root
- Psilocarphus brevissimus, dwarf woolly-heads
- Psilocarphus elatior, tall woolly-heads
- Pyrrocoma carthamoides, large-flower goldenweed
- Pyrrocoma carthamoides var. carthamoides, large-flower goldenweed
- Pyrrocoma carthamoides var. subsquarrosa, beartooth large-flowered goldenweed
- Pyrrocoma integrifolia, entire-leaf goldenweed
- Pyrrocoma lanceolata, lance-leaved goldenweed
- Pyrrocoma uniflora, plantain goldenweed
- Ratibida columnifera, prairie coneflower
- Rudbeckia hirta, blackeyed susan
- Rudbeckia laciniata, cut-leaved coneflower
- Rudbeckia occidentalis, western coneflower
- Saussurea americana, American saw-wort
- Saussurea densa, dwarf saw-wort
- Saussurea weberi, Weber's saw-wort
- Scorzonera laciniata, mediterranean serpent-root
- Senecio amplectens, clasping groundsel
- Senecio canus, woolly groundsel
- Senecio congestus, marsh ragwort
- Senecio conterminus, northwestern groundsel
- Senecio crassulus, thick-leaf groundsel
- Senecio cymbalarioides, cleft-leaf groundsel
- Senecio debilis, weak groundsel
- Senecio dimorphophyllus, two-leaf ragwort
- Senecio dimorphophyllus var. dimorphophyllus, twoleaf ragwort
- Senecio dimorphophyllus var. paysonii, Payson's groundsel
- Senecio elmeri, Elmer's ragwort
- Senecio eremophilus, desert groundsel
- Senecio fremontii, Fremont's ragwort
- Senecio fuscatus, twice-hairy butterweed
- Senecio hydrophiloides, sweet marsh ragwort
- Senecio hydrophilus, alkali-marsh ragwort
- Senecio indecorus, elegant groundsel
- Senecio integerrimus, entire-leaf ragwort
- Senecio integerrimus var. exaltatus, Columbia ragwort
- Senecio integerrimus var. integerrimus, lambstongue ragwort
- Senecio integerrimus var. scribneri, Scribner's ragwort
- Senecio jacobaea, tansy ragwort
- Senecio lugens, black-tip groundsel
- Senecio megacephalus, large-headed ragwort
- Senecio pauciflorus, few-flowered butterweed
- Senecio pauperculus, balsam ragwort
- Senecio plattensis, prairie ragwort
- Senecio pseudaureus, western golden groundsel
- Senecio serra, tall groundsel
- Senecio sphaerocephalus, rough-head groundsel
- Senecio streptanthifolius, Rocky Mountain groundsel
- Senecio triangularis, arrow-leaf groundsel
- Senecio vulgaris, common groundsel
- Senecio werneriifolius, rock groundsel
- Solidago canadensis, Canada goldenrod
- Solidago canadensis var. gilvocanescens, Great Plains goldenrod
- Solidago canadensis var. salebrosa, rough Canada goldenrod
- Solidago gigantea, giant goldenrod
- Solidago missouriensis, Missouri goldenrod
- Solidago mollis, velvety goldenrod
- Solidago multiradiata, Rocky Mountain goldenrod
- Solidago nana, baby goldenrod
- Solidago nemoralis, field goldenrod
- Solidago ptarmicoides, prairie goldenrod
- Solidago rigida, stiff goldenrod
- Solidago simplex, sticky goldenrod
- Solidago velutina, three-nerved goldenrod
- Sonchus arvensis, field sowthistle
- Sonchus arvensis subsp. arvensis, field sowthistle
- Sonchus arvensis subsp. uliginosus, field sowthistle
- Sonchus asper, spiny-leaf sowthistle
- Sonchus oleraceus, common sowthistle
- Sphaeromeria argentea, chicken-sage
- Sphaeromeria capitata, rock-tansy
- Stenotus acaulis, stemless mock goldenweed
- Stenotus armerioides, thrift mock goldenweed
- Stenotus lanuginosus, woolly goldenweed
- Stenotus lanuginosus var. andersonii, woolly goldenweed
- Stenotus multicaulis, many-stem goldenweed
- Stephanomeria runcinata, desert wirelettuce
- Stephanomeria tenuifolia, narrowleaf wirelettuce
- Symphyotrichum ascendens, western aster
- Symphyotrichum boreale, boreal aster
- Symphyotrichum campestre, western meadow aster
- Symphyotrichum ciliatum, rayless alkali aster
- Symphyotrichum ciliolatum, fringed blue aster
- Symphyotrichum eatonii, Eaton's aster
- Symphyotrichum ericoides, white heath aster
- Symphyotrichum falcatum, white prairie aster
- Symphyotrichum foliaceum, leafy-bracted aster
- Symphyotrichum foliaceum var. apricum, alpine leafy-bract aster
- Symphyotrichum foliaceum var. cusickii, Cusick's aster
- Symphyotrichum foliaceum var. foliaceum, leafy-bract aster
- Symphyotrichum foliaceum var. parryi, Parry's aster
- Symphyotrichum hendersonii, henderson's aster
- Symphyotrichum laeve, smooth blue aster
- Symphyotrichum lanceolatum, white panicle aster
- Symphyotrichum molle, soft aster
- Symphyotrichum oblongifolium, aromatic aster
- Symphyotrichum spathulatum, western mountain aster
- Symphyotrichum subspicatum, Douglas's aster
- Symphyotrichum welshii, Welsh's aster
- Tanacetum balsamita, coastmary
- Tanacetum parthenium, feverfew
- Tanacetum vulgare, common tansy
- Taraxacum ceratophorum, Rocky Mountain dandelion
- Taraxacum erythrospermum, redseed dandelion
- Taraxacum lyratum, alpine dandelion
- Taraxacum officinale, common dandelion
- Tetradymia canescens, gray horsebrush
- Tetradymia spinosa, short-spine horsebrush
- Thelesperma megapotamicum, hopi-tea
- Thelesperma subnudum, border goldthread
- Tonestus aberrans, Idaho goldenweed
- Tonestus lyallii, Lyall's goldenweed
- Tonestus pygmaeus, pygmy goldenweed
- Townsendia condensata, cushion townsend-daisy
- Townsendia exscapa, silky townsend-daisy
- Townsendia florifera, showy townsend-daisy
- Townsendia hookeri, Hooker's townsend-daisy
- Townsendia incana, hoary townsend-daisy
- Townsendia leptotes, slender townsend-daisy
- Townsendia montana, Wyoming townsend-daisy
- Townsendia parryi, Parry's townsend-daisy
- Townsendia spathulata, sword townsend-daisy
- Tragopogon dubius, meadow goat's-beard
- Tragopogon porrifolius, purple goat's-beard
- Tragopogon pratensis, meadow goat's-beard
- Triniteurybia aberrans
- Verbesina encelioides, golden crownbeard
- Vernonia fasciculata subsp. corymbosa, fascicled ironweed
- Viguiera multiflora, many-flowered viguiera
- Wyethia amplexicaulis, northern mule's-ears
- Wyethia helianthoides, white-head mule's-ears
- Wyethia scabra, rough mule's ears
- Xanthium spinosum, spiny cocklebur
- Xanthium strumarium, rough cocklebur
- Xylorhiza glabriuscula, woody aster

== See also ==
- List of dicotyledons of Montana
