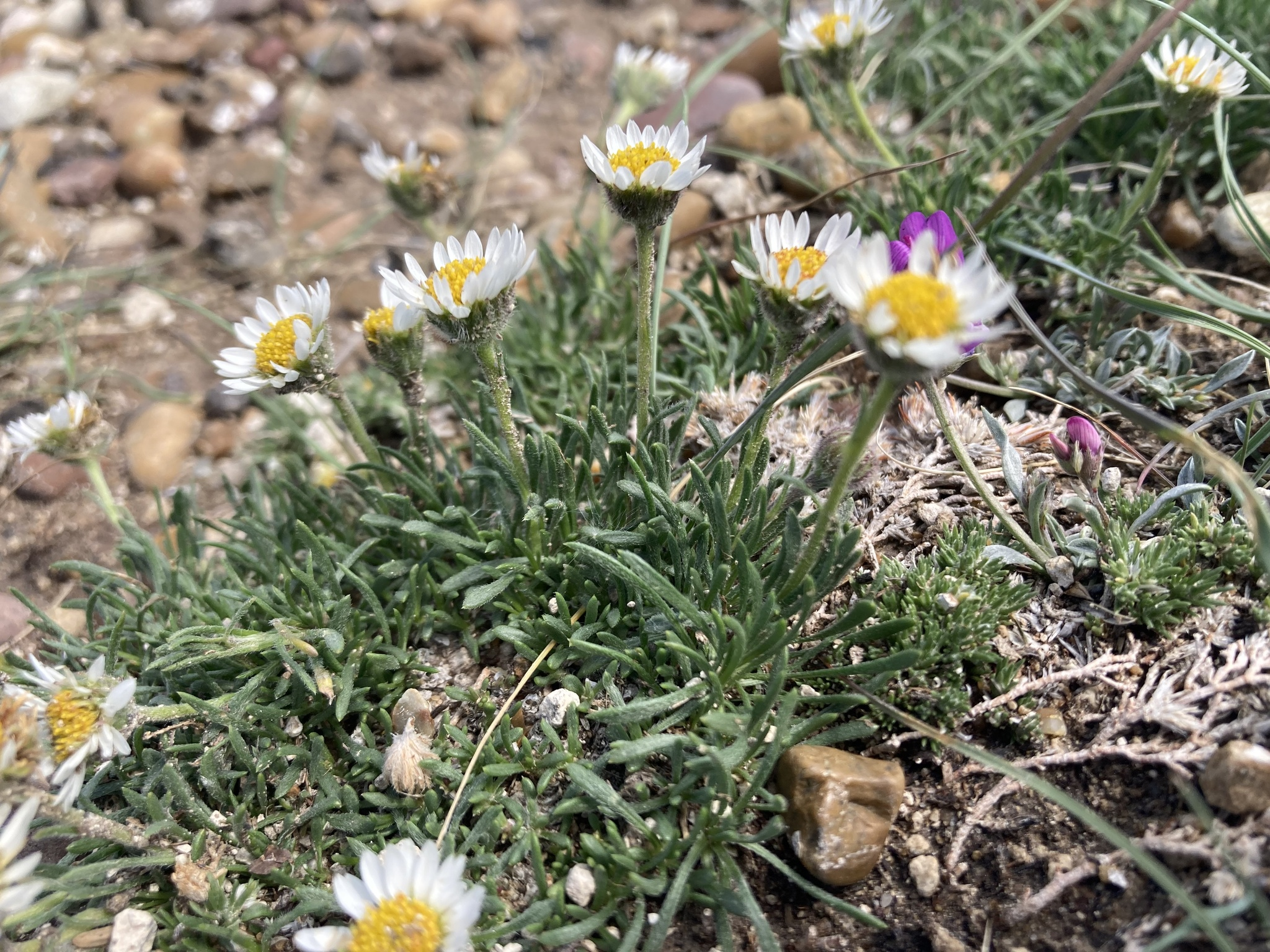
- In Saskatchewan

Conservation status
- Vulnerable (NatureServe)

Scientific classification
- Kingdom: Plantae
- Clade: Tracheophytes
- Clade: Angiosperms
- Clade: Eudicots
- Clade: Asterids
- Order: Asterales
- Family: Asteraceae
- Genus: Erigeron
- Species: E. radicatus

Binomial name
- Erigeron radicatus Hook.

Synonyms
- Erigeron huberi S.L.Welsh & N.D.Atwood; Erigeron inamoenus A.Nelson; Erigeron macounii Greene

= Erigeron radicatus =

Species of flowering plant

Erigeron radicatus is a North American species of flowering plant in the family Asteraceae known by the common names Hooker's fleabane and taproot fleabane The species grows in central Canada (Alberta, Saskatchewan) and parts of the north-central United States, primarily the northern Rocky Mountains and the Black Hills. It has been found in Idaho, Montana, Utah, Wyoming, Colorado, Nebraska, and South Dakota, with a few isolated populations reported from North Dakota.

Erigeron radicatus is a small perennial herb up to 12 centimeters (4.8 inches) tall, producing a woody branching caudex. The plant generally produces only 1 flower head per stem. Each head has 12–85 purple or white ray florets surrounding numerous yellow disc florets. The species grows on rocky slopes, ledges, ridges, and cliff faces at high elevations.
