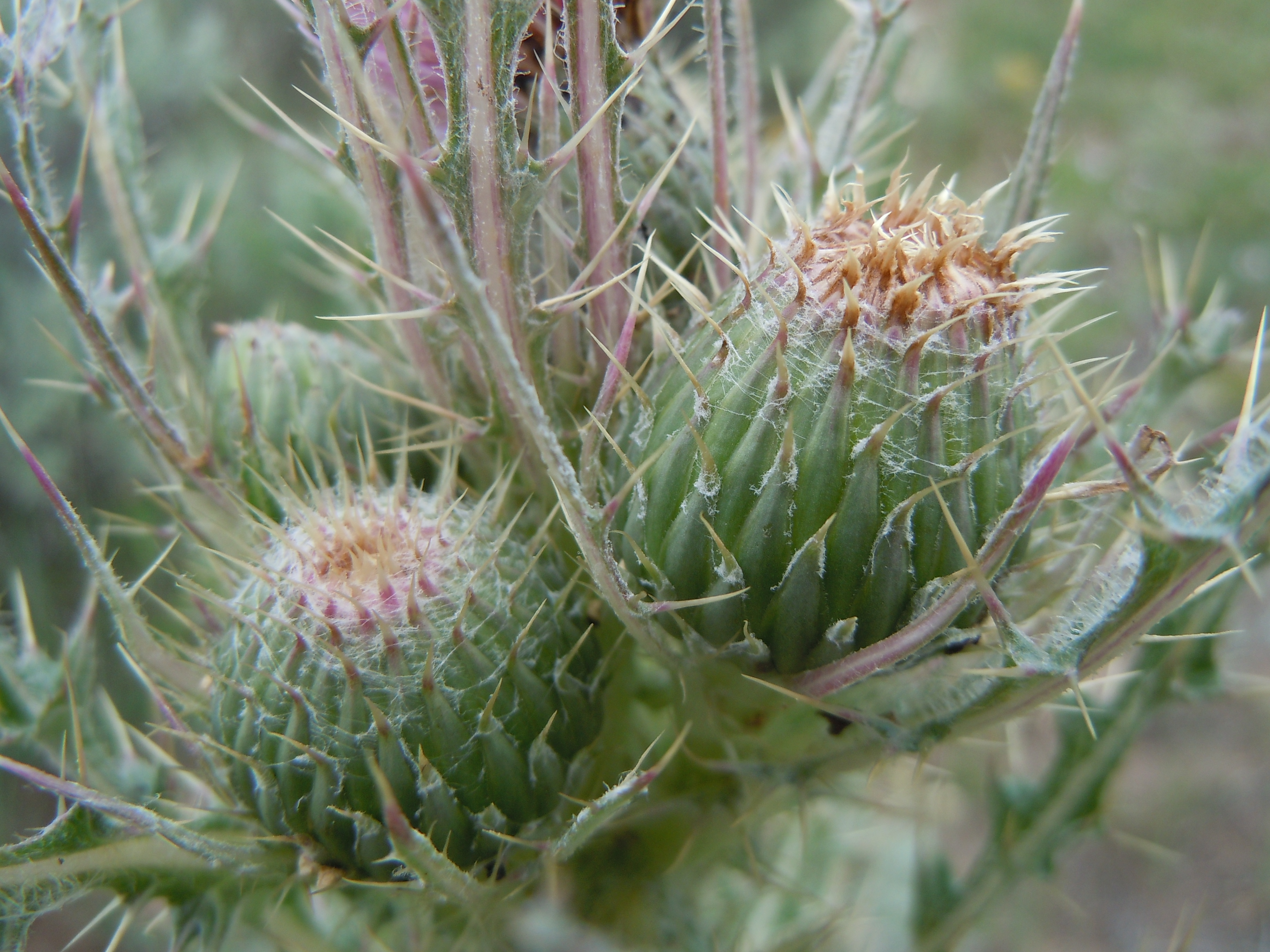

Scientific classification
- Kingdom: Plantae
- Clade: Tracheophytes
- Clade: Angiosperms
- Clade: Eudicots
- Clade: Asterids
- Order: Asterales
- Family: Asteraceae
- Genus: Cirsium
- Species: C. brevistylum

Binomial name
- Cirsium brevistylum Cronquist

= Cirsium brevistylum =

Species of thistle

Cirsium brevistylum is a species of thistle known by the common names Indian thistle and clustered thistle. It is native to western North America having been found in southwestern British Columbia, Washington, Oregon, Idaho, Montana, and California.

Cirsium brevistylum grows in moist areas in many types of habitat, from mountain forests to chaparral and coastal marshes. This native thistle is annual or biennial, reaching 200 cm (79 in) in height and known to exceed 300 cm (9.8 ft) at times. There is usually a single stem which may branch toward the top and is coated in hairs and webby fibers. The leaves are deeply cut into many lobes lined with twisted teeth, the longest leaves near the base of the plant reaching about 25 centimeters long. The leaves are borne on winged petioles with many spines. The inflorescence bears one to many flower heads, both at the ends of the stem branches and in the leaf axils. The flower head reaches about 3 centimeters long by 4 wide and is lined with cobwebby, bristly, spine-tipped phyllaries. The flower head is packed with white or pink flowers about 2 centimeters long. The fruit is a brown achene a few millimeters long topped with a pappus one to two centimeters in length.

== Gallery ==
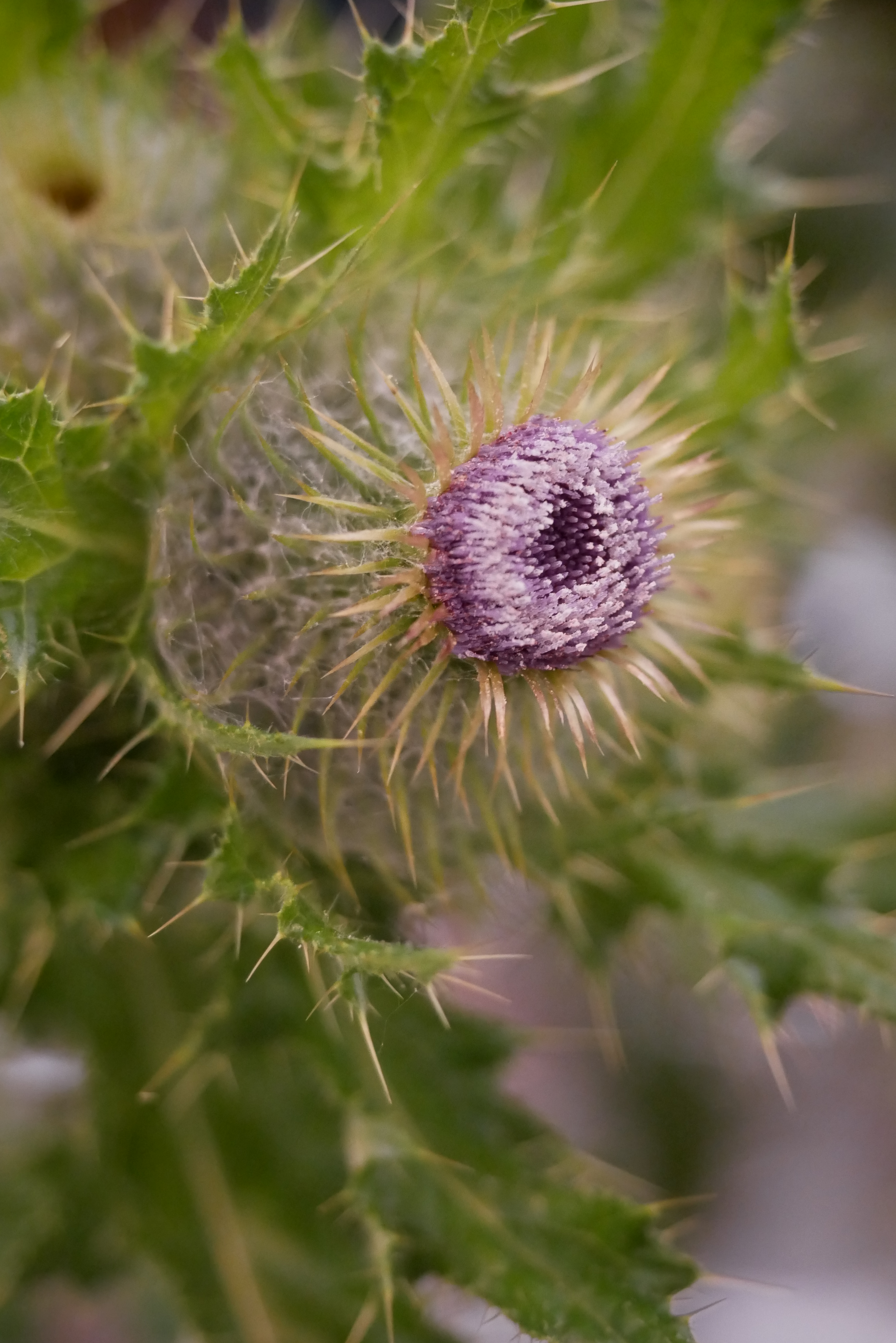
Indian Thistle

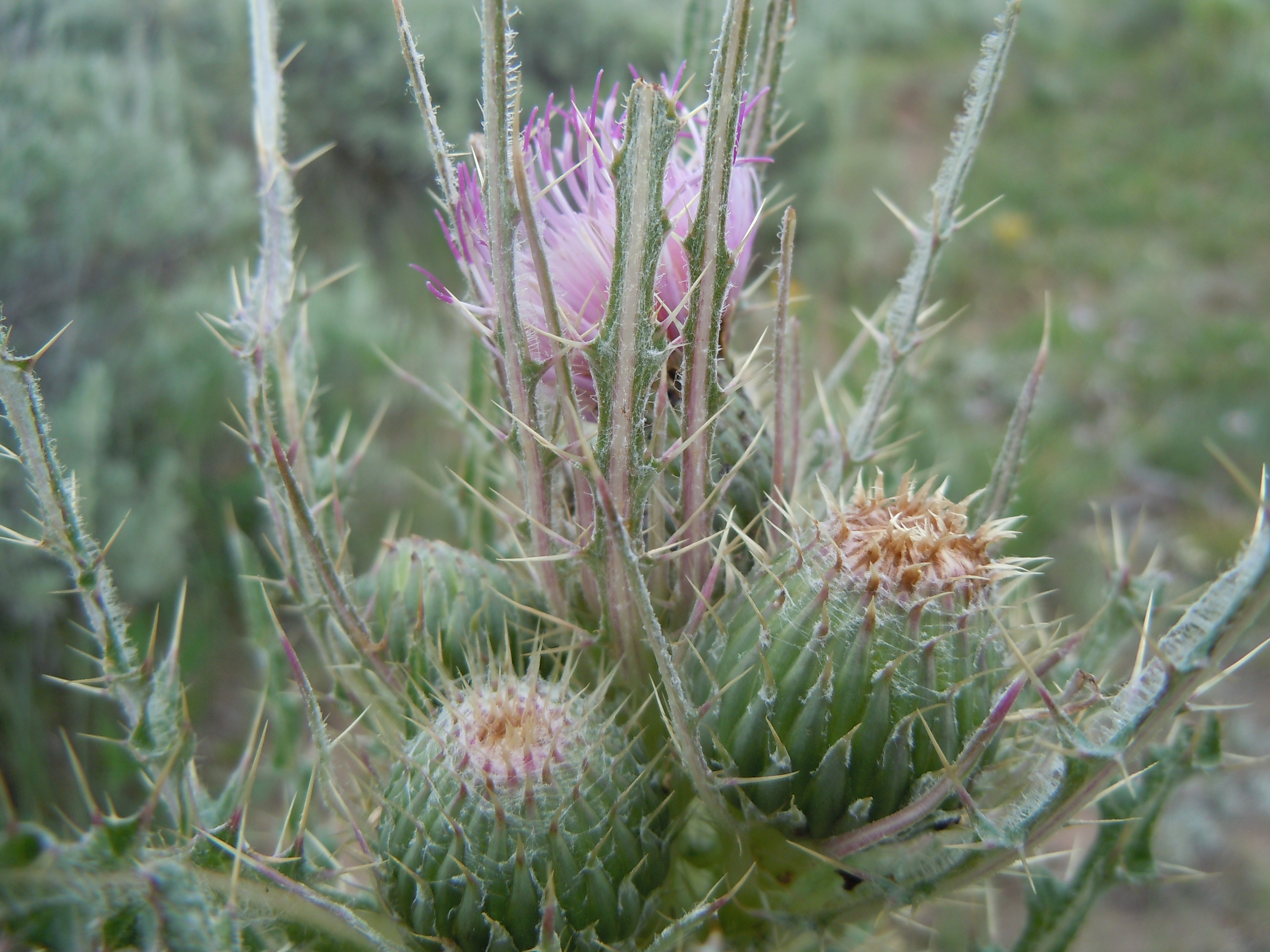
Cirsium Brevistylum

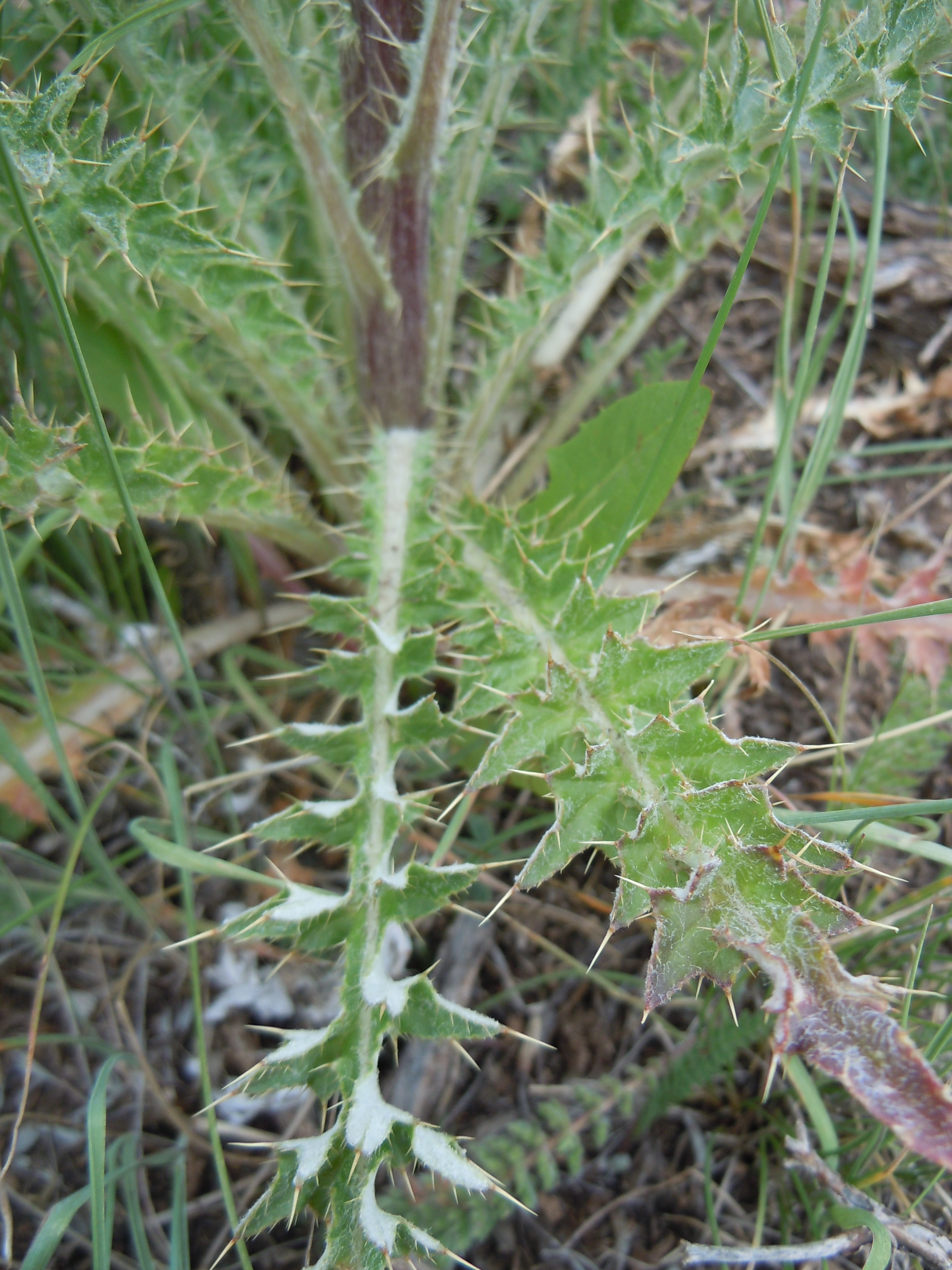
Cirsium Brevistylum sometimes found in sagebrush steppe

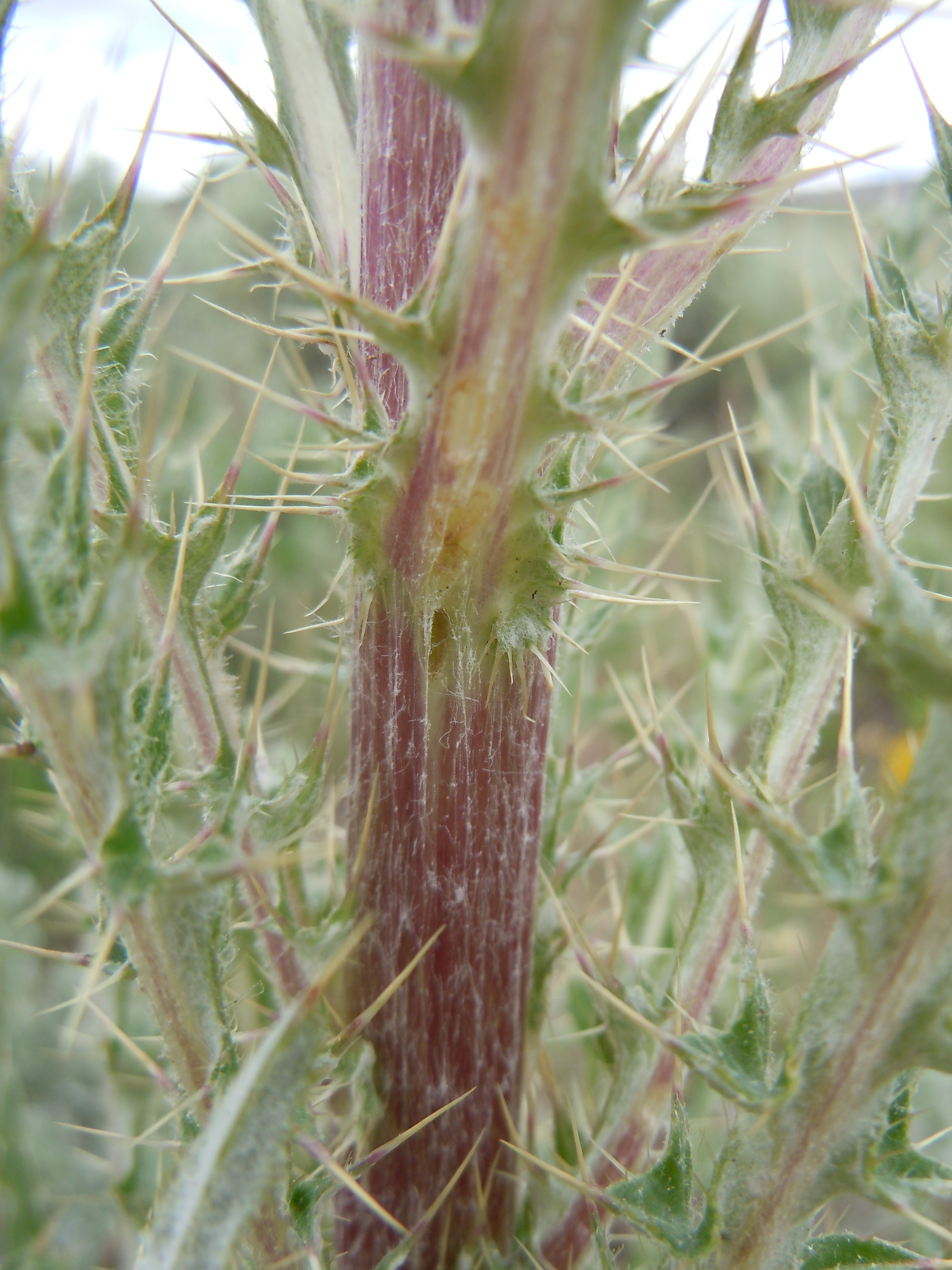
Cirsium Brevistylum stem
