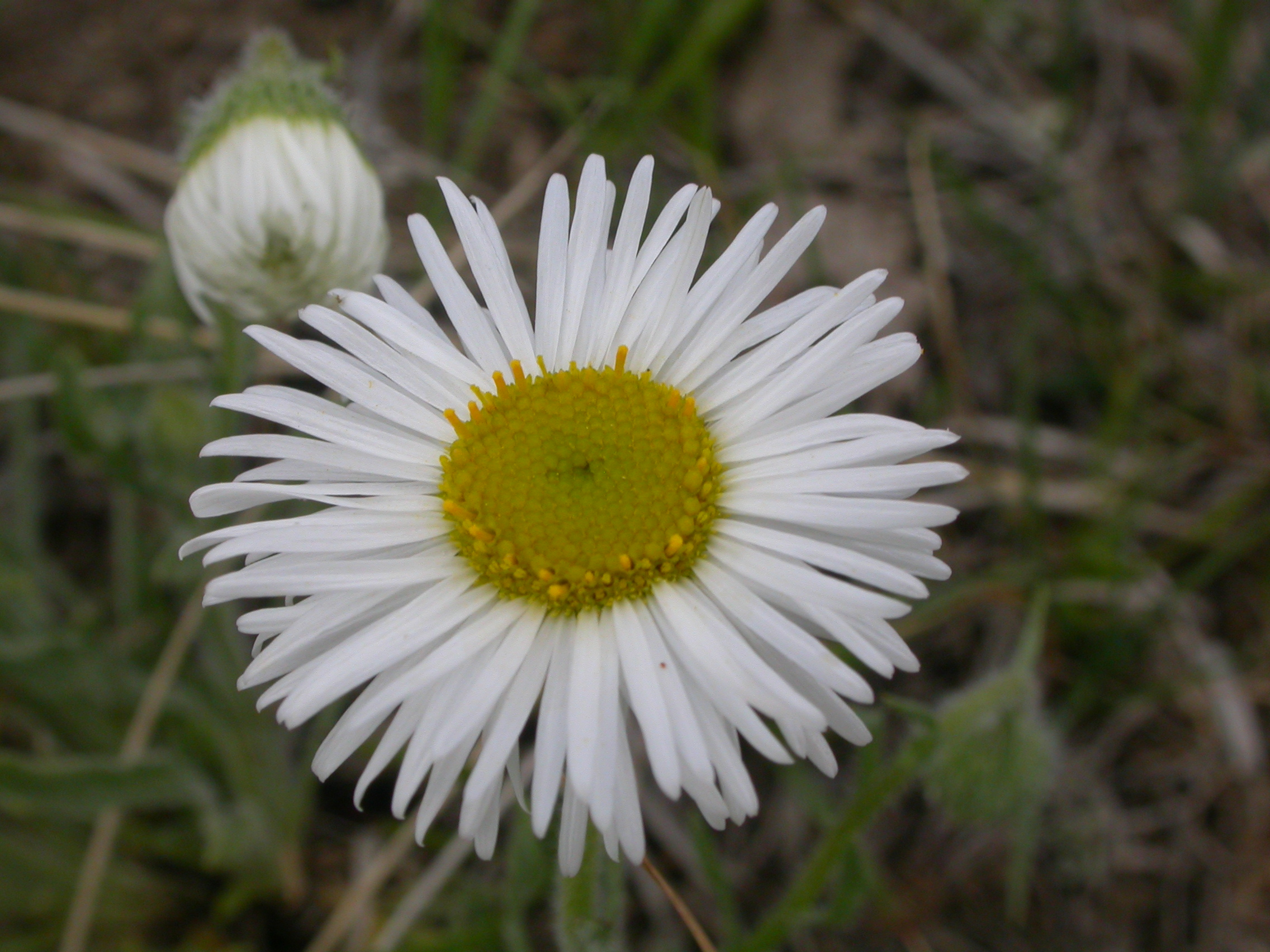

Scientific classification
- Kingdom: Plantae
- Clade: Tracheophytes
- Clade: Angiosperms
- Clade: Eudicots
- Clade: Asterids
- Order: Asterales
- Family: Asteraceae
- Genus: Erigeron
- Species: E. ochroleucus

Binomial name
- Erigeron ochroleucus Nutt.

Synonyms
- Synonymy: Erigeron ochroleucum Nutt.; Erigeron canescens Parry ex A.Gray; Erigeron laetevirens Rydb.; Erigeron montanensis Rydb.; Erigeron ochroleucus var. hirtellus (DC.) A.Gray; Erigeron ochroleucus var. scribneri (Canby ex Rydb.) Cronquist; Erigeron scribneri Canby ex Rydb.; Erigeron tweedyanus Canby & Rose; Wyomingia tweedyana (Canby & Rose) A. Nelson

= Erigeron ochroleucus =

Species of flowering plant

Erigeron ochroleucus is a North American species of flowering plant in the family Asteraceae, called the buff fleabane or buff daisy. It is native to western Canada and the western United States from Alaska and Yukon southeast as far as Colorado and Nebraska.

Erigeron ochroleucus is a biennial or perennial herb up to 35 centimeters (14 inches) tall. The plant generally produces 1-8 flower heads per stem, each head with up to 70 white or pink ray florets surrounding numerous yellow disc florets. The species grows on open slopes and meadows in sagebrush scrub and conifer forests.
