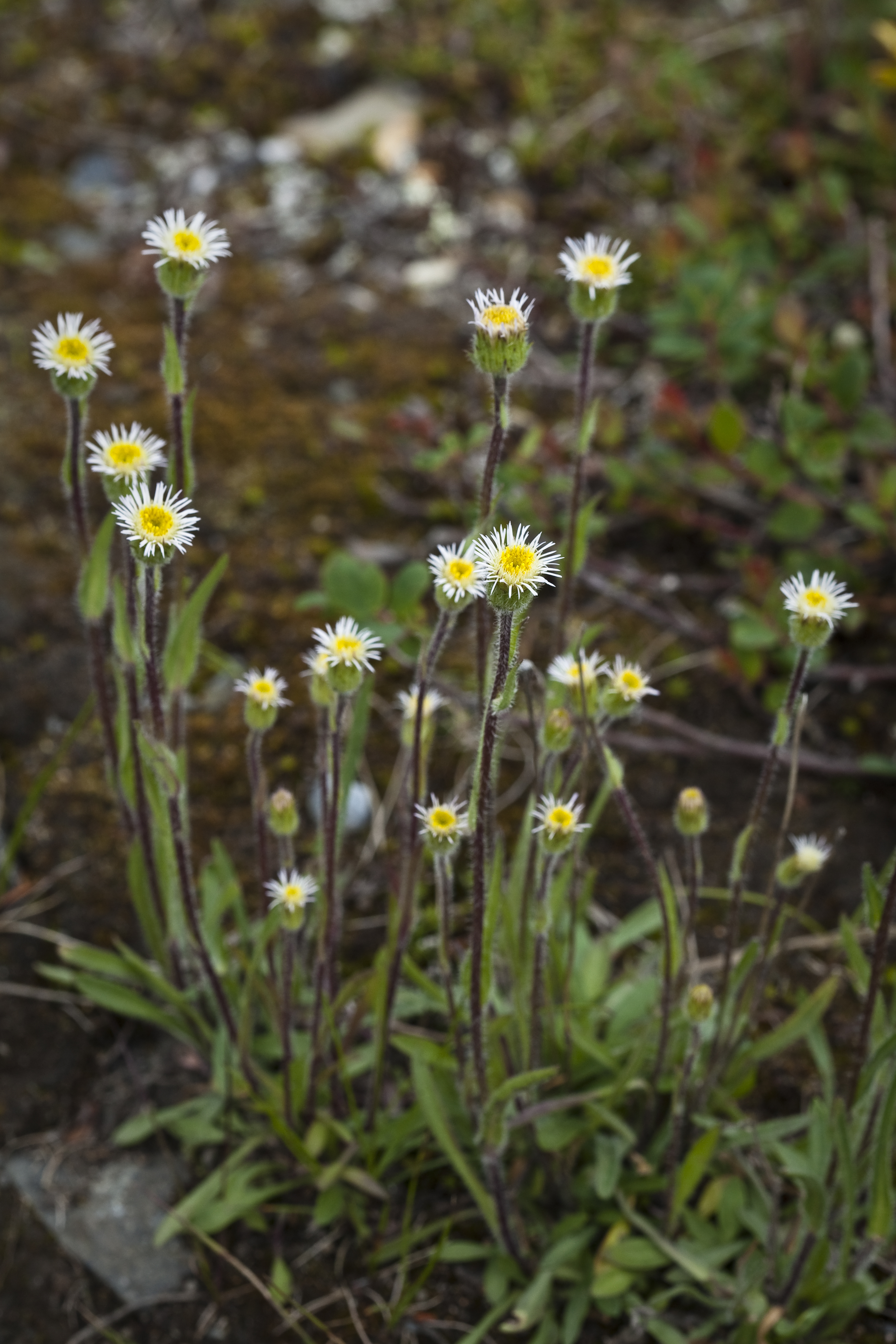
- Denali National Park and Preserve, Alaska

Conservation status
- Least Concern (IUCN 3.1)

Scientific classification
- Kingdom: Plantae
- Clade: Tracheophytes
- Clade: Angiosperms
- Clade: Eudicots
- Clade: Asterids
- Order: Asterales
- Family: Asteraceae
- Genus: Erigeron
- Species: E. lonchophyllus

Binomial name
- Erigeron lonchophyllus Hook.

Synonyms
- Erigeron kindbergii Greene; Erigeron lonchophyllus var. laurentianus Vict.; Erigeron minor (Hook.) Rydb.; Erigeron racemosus Nutt.; Trimorpha lonchophylla (Hook.) G.L.Nesom

= Erigeron lonchophyllus =

Species of flowering plant

Erigeron lonchophyllus is an Asian and North American species of flowering plant in the family Asteraceae known by the common name shortray fleabane.

Erigeron lonchophyllus is native to North America including most of Canada except the 4 Atlantic provinces, as well as the western and north-central United States. It occurs in many types of moist habitat and disturbed areas. It is also found in much of Asia (Siberia, Mongolia, Xinjiang, Kazakhstan, Iran).

Erigeron lonchophyllus is an annual or biennial herb growing 2 to 60 centimeters (0.4 to 24 inches tall, its stem hairy to bristly. The leaves are up to 8 centimeters (3.2 inches) long at the base and smaller and shorter along the upper stem. The inflorescence includes one to 12 small flower heads. Each head is lined with hairy purple-tipped phyllaries and contains up to 130 hairlike white to pink ray florets each measuring only 2 or 3 millimeters long. These surround numerous yellow disc florets in the center.
