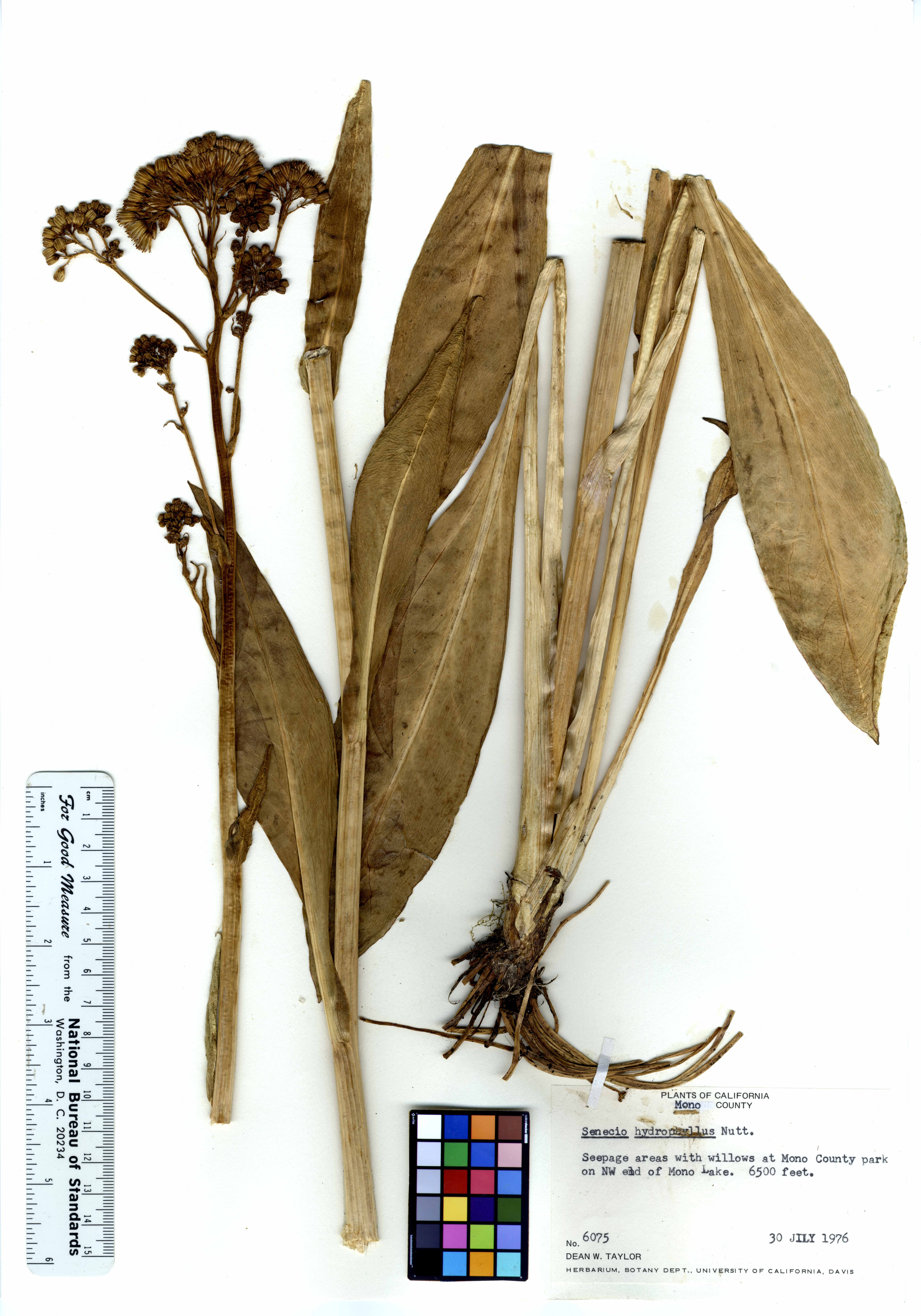
- Senecio hydrophiloides specimen

Scientific classification
- Kingdom: Plantae
- Clade: Tracheophytes
- Clade: Angiosperms
- Clade: Eudicots
- Clade: Asterids
- Order: Asterales
- Family: Asteraceae
- Genus: Senecio
- Species: S. hydrophiloides

Binomial name
- Senecio hydrophiloides Rydb.

Synonyms
- Senecio foetidus

= Senecio hydrophiloides =

Species of flowering plant

Senecio hydrophiloides is a species of flowering plant in the aster family known by the common names tall groundsel and sweet marsh ragwort. It is native to western North America from British Columbia and Alberta to northern California to Utah, where it grows in wet meadows and similar habitat. It is a biennial or perennial herb producing a single erect stem or a cluster of a few stems which may exceed one meter in maximum height. The plants are green to red in color and usually without hairs, but new growth can be woolly. The leaves are lance-shaped to oval with toothed edges, the blades up to 25 centimeters long and borne on long winged petioles. The leaves are firm and sometimes a bit fleshy. The inflorescence is a loose or dense cluster of up to 30 or more flower heads lined with black-tipped phyllaries. They contain many yellowish disc florets at the center and often have some yellow ray florets, though these are sometimes absent. Senecio Hydrophiloides can cause Dermatitis.
