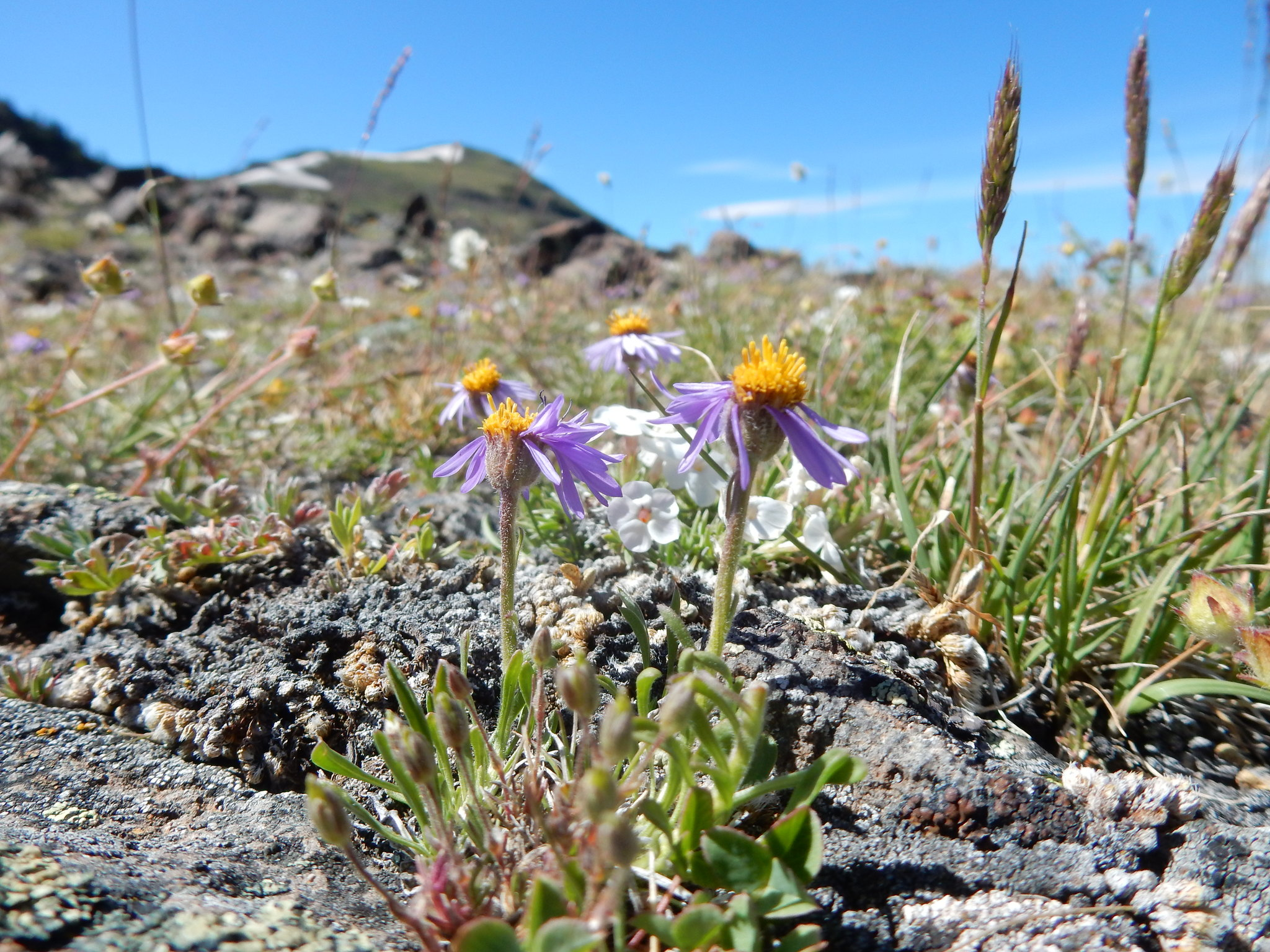
- In Montana

Scientific classification
- Kingdom: Plantae
- Clade: Tracheophytes
- Clade: Angiosperms
- Clade: Eudicots
- Clade: Asterids
- Order: Asterales
- Family: Asteraceae
- Genus: Erigeron
- Species: E. rydbergii

Binomial name
- Erigeron rydbergii Cronquist

= Erigeron rydbergii =

Species of flowering plant

Erigeron rydbergii is a North American species of flowering plant in the family Asteraceae known by the common name Rydberg's fleabane. It is native to the western United States, in the Rocky Mountains and other nearby ranges in the states of Montana, Wyoming, Idaho, and Utah.

Erigeron rydbergii grows in subalpine to alpine slopes at high elevations. It is a tiny perennial rarely more than 6 centimeters (2.4 inches) tall, forming a thick taproot. The inflorescence generally contains only 1 flower head per stem. Each head contains 15–35 blue, purple, or rarely white ray florets surrounding many yellow disc florets.
