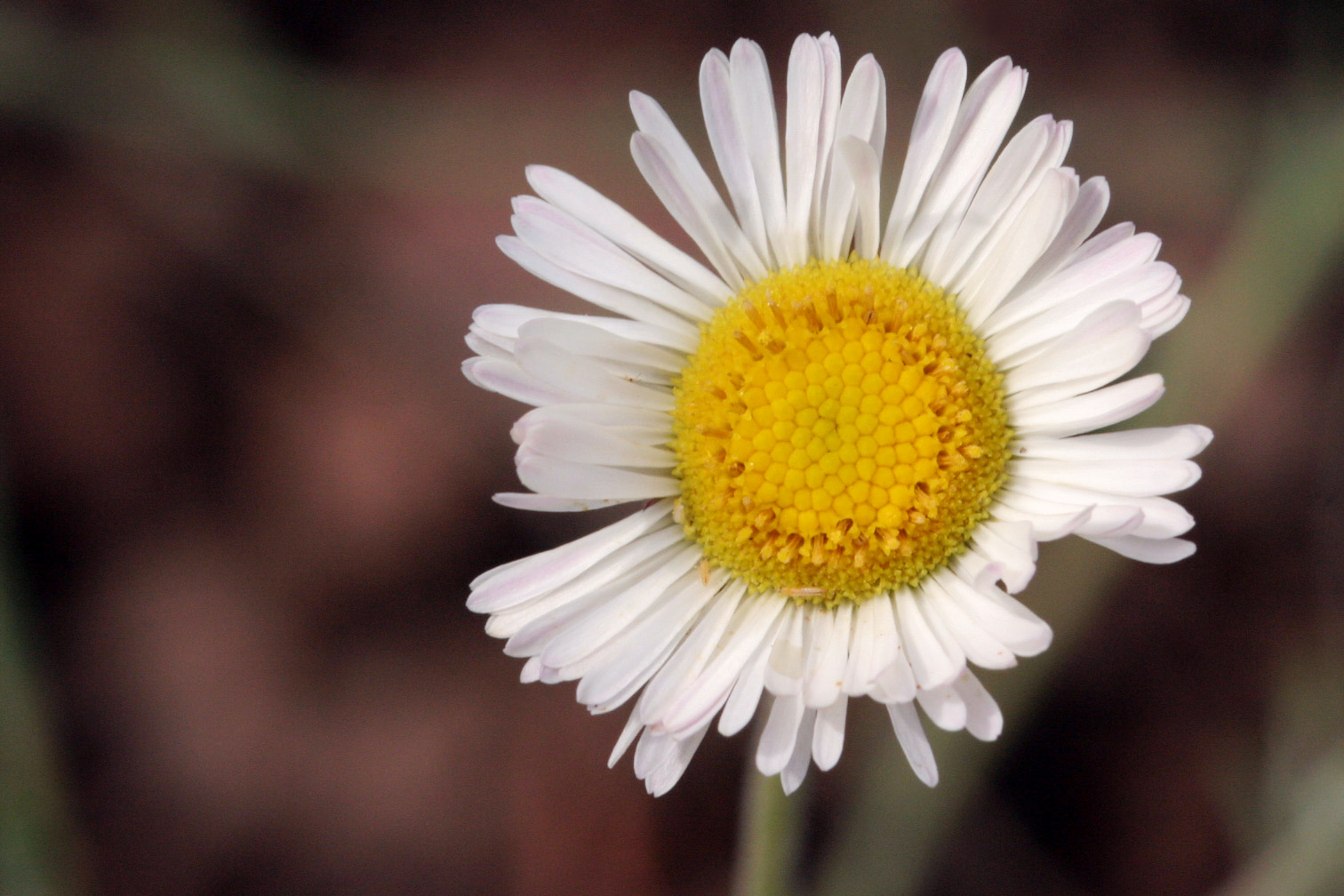

Conservation status
- Secure (NatureServe)

Scientific classification
- Kingdom: Plantae
- Clade: Tracheophytes
- Clade: Angiosperms
- Clade: Eudicots
- Clade: Asterids
- Order: Asterales
- Family: Asteraceae
- Genus: Erigeron
- Species: E. flagellaris

Binomial name
- Erigeron flagellaris A.Gray

Synonyms
- Erigeron flagellare A.Gray; Erigeron nudiflorus Buckley

= Erigeron flagellaris =

Species of flowering plant

Erigeron flagellaris is a North American species of flowering plants in the family Asteraceae known by the common names trailing fleabane.

Erigeron flagellaris is widespread across much of western North America. It has been found in western Canada (Alberta + British Columbia), the western United States (primarily the Rocky Mountains and Intermountain regions) and northern Mexico (from Chihuahua east to Tamaulipas and south to Durango).

Erigeron flagellaris is a small perennial herb rarely more than 15 centimeters (8 inches) in height. Most of the leaves are clustered around the base of the stems. The plant reproduces by means of stolons, which are horizontal stems running along the surface of the ground, forming new roots and shoots at frequent intervals. Thus the plant can form extensive mats of clones. Each stem usually produces only 1 flower head per stem, though occasionally 2 or 3. Each head contains as many as 125 white ray florets surrounding numerous yellow disc florets.
