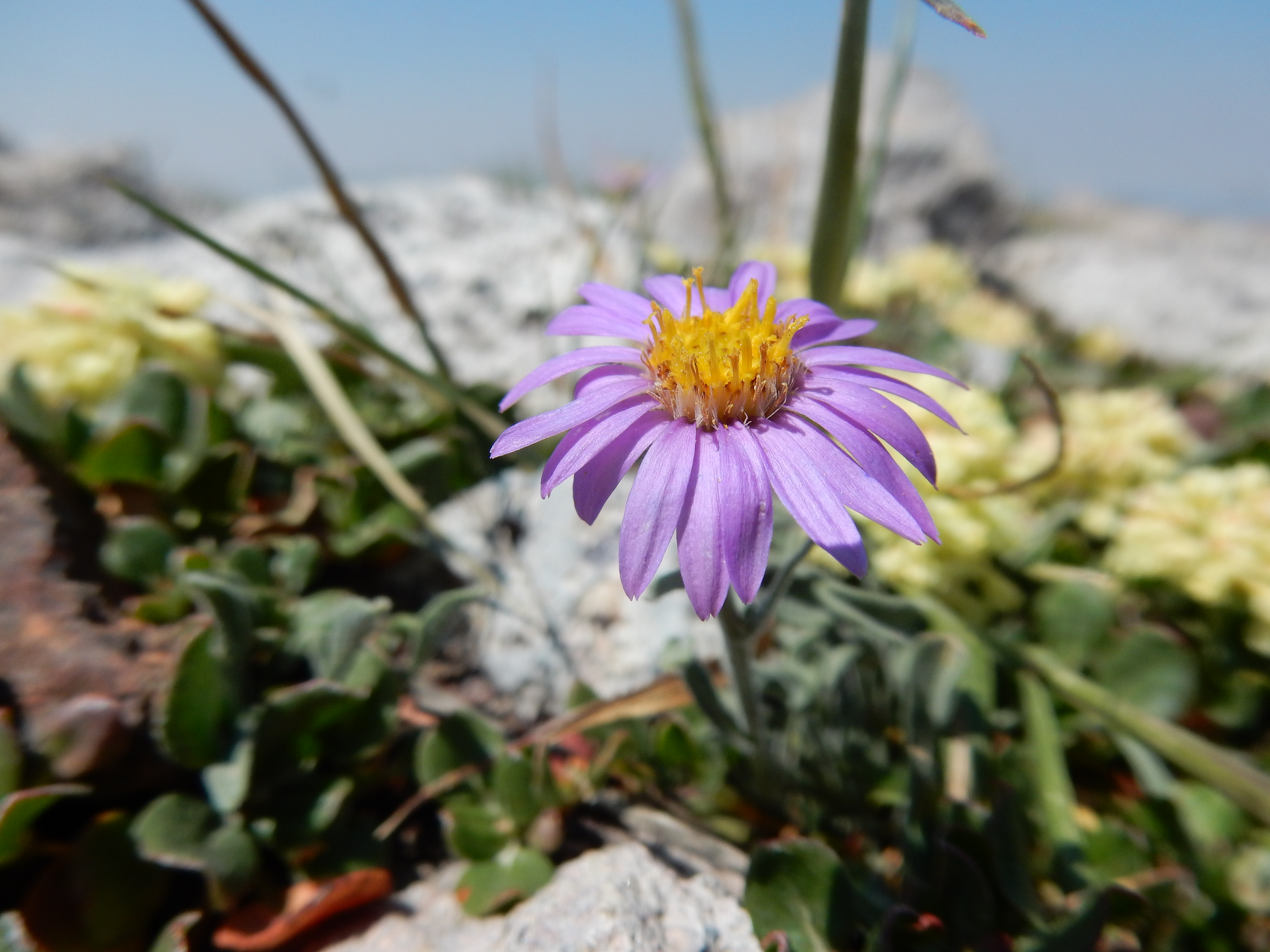

Scientific classification
- Kingdom: Plantae
- Clade: Tracheophytes
- Clade: Angiosperms
- Clade: Eudicots
- Clade: Asterids
- Order: Asterales
- Family: Asteraceae
- Genus: Erigeron
- Species: E. asperugineus

Binomial name
- Erigeron asperugineus (D.C.Eaton) A.Gray

Synonyms
- Aster asperugineus D.C.Eaton; Erigeron elkoensis A.Nelson & J.F.Macbr.; Erigeron inconspicuus MacMill.

= Erigeron asperugineus =

Species of flowering plant

Erigeron asperugineus, the Idaho fleabane, is a species of flowering plant in the family Asteraceae. It is native to the Western United States, particularly the states of Montana, Idaho, Utah, and Nevada.

Erigeron asperugineus is a small perennial herb up to 20 cm (8 inches) tall, the stems mostly leafless and often lying flat. The basal leaves have short hair with meandering margins and are wider towards the tip. One plant usually produces 1 or 2 flower heads, each with 10–25 blue, pink, or purple ray florets about 1 centimetre (1/2 in) in length and surrounding many yellow disc florets.
