= Erigeron evermannii =

Scientific classification
- Kingdom: Plantae
- Clade: Tracheophytes
- Clade: Angiosperms
- Clade: Eudicots
- Clade: Asterids
- Order: Asterales
- Family: Asteraceae
- Genus: Erigeron
- Species: E. evermannii

Binomial name
- Erigeron evermannii Rydb.

Species of flowering plant

Erigeron evermannii is a North American species of flowering plants in the family Asteraceae known by the common name Evermann's fleabane.

Erigeron evermannii is native to the western United States. It is native to central Idaho and has also been found in western Montana. It grows at high elevations in the mountains, on steep slopes, talus outcrops, and ridges, sometime alongside whitebark pine.

Erigeron evermannii is a very short perennial herb rarely more than 10 centimeters (4 inches) in height, sprouting from the roots and hence forming a sizable clump of many shoots crowded together. Most of the leaves are close to the ground clustered around the base of the plant. Each stem usually produces only one flower head, with as many as 40 white ray florets surrounding numerous yellow disc florets.
