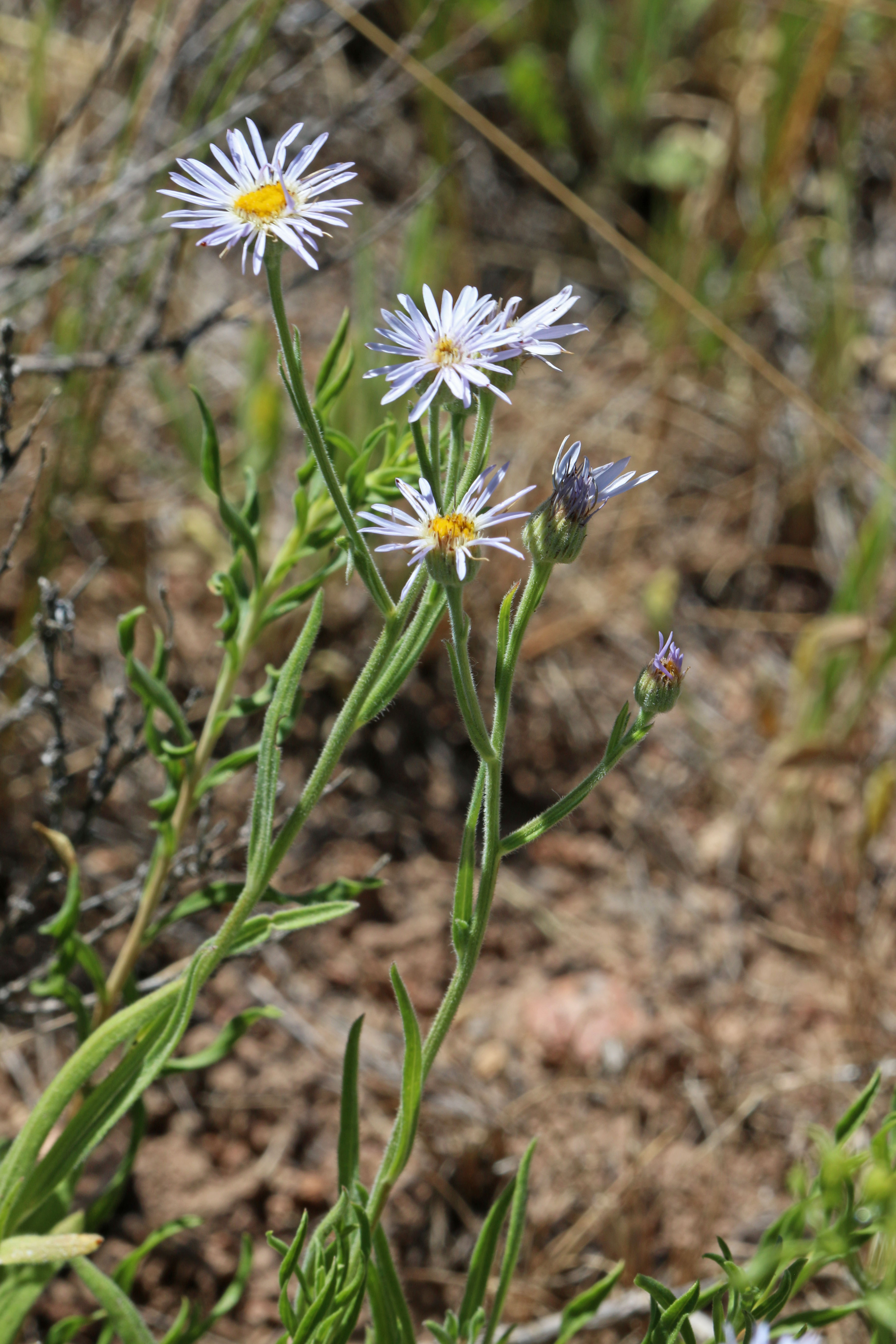

Scientific classification
- Kingdom: Plantae
- Clade: Tracheophytes
- Clade: Angiosperms
- Clade: Eudicots
- Clade: Asterids
- Order: Asterales
- Family: Asteraceae
- Genus: Erigeron
- Species: E. corymbosus

Binomial name
- Erigeron corymbosus Nutt.

Synonyms
- Erigeron corymbosum Nutt.

= Erigeron corymbosus =

Species of plant

Erigeron corymbosus is a North American species of flowering plants in the family Asteraceae known by the common name long-leaf fleabane. It is found in western Canada (British Columbia) and the western United States (Washington, Oregon, Idaho, Montana, Wyoming, Utah).

Erigeron corymbosus is a perennial herb up to 50 cm (20 inches) tall, forming a taproot. Each branch produces an array of up to 16 flower heads, each head with 35–65 blue or pink ray florets plus numerous yellow disc florets.
