= Erigeron parryi =

Scientific classification
- Kingdom: Plantae
- Clade: Tracheophytes
- Clade: Angiosperms
- Clade: Eudicots
- Clade: Asterids
- Order: Asterales
- Family: Asteraceae
- Genus: Erigeron
- Species: E. parryi

Binomial name
- Erigeron parryi Canby & Rose

Species of flowering plant

Erigeron parryi is a species of flowering plant in the family Asteraceae known by the common name Parry's fleabane. It is native to the Rocky Mountains of southern Montana and northern Wyoming.

Erigeron parryi is a small perennial herb rarely more than 15 centimeters (6 inches) tall, producing a woody taproot. The leaves are covered with wool. The plant generally produces only 1 flower head per stem, though occasionally 2 or 3. Each head has 20–40, pink, or blue ray florets surrounding numerous yellow disc florets. The plant grows on rocky limestone slopes, frequently alongside sagebrush.
