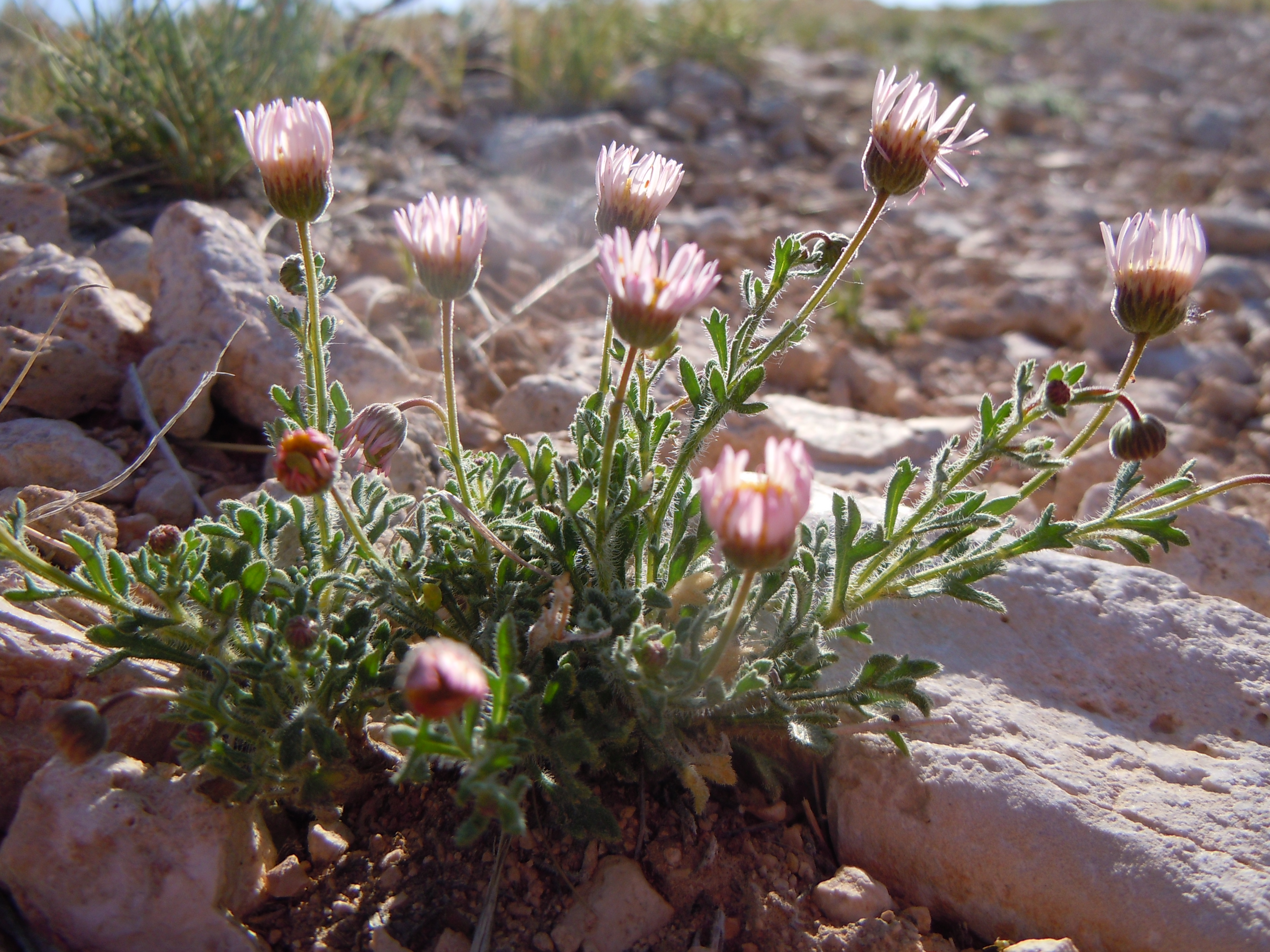

Scientific classification
- Kingdom: Plantae
- Clade: Tracheophytes
- Clade: Angiosperms
- Clade: Eudicots
- Clade: Asterids
- Order: Asterales
- Family: Asteraceae
- Genus: Erigeron
- Species: E. allocotus

Binomial name
- Erigeron allocotus S.F.Blake

= Erigeron allocotus =

Species of flowering plant

Erigeron allocotus is a species of flowering plant in the family Asteraceae known by the common name Bighorn fleabane. It has been found only in the Bighorn Mountains of north-central Wyoming and southern Montana.

Erigeron allocotus is a short, branching shrub rarely more than 18 cm (7 inches) tall. Leaves are 3-lobed. The inflorescence generally consists of 2 or 3 flower heads per stem, each head with sometimes as many as 40 small yellow disc florets and surrounded by a ring of up to 40 white or blue ray florets.
