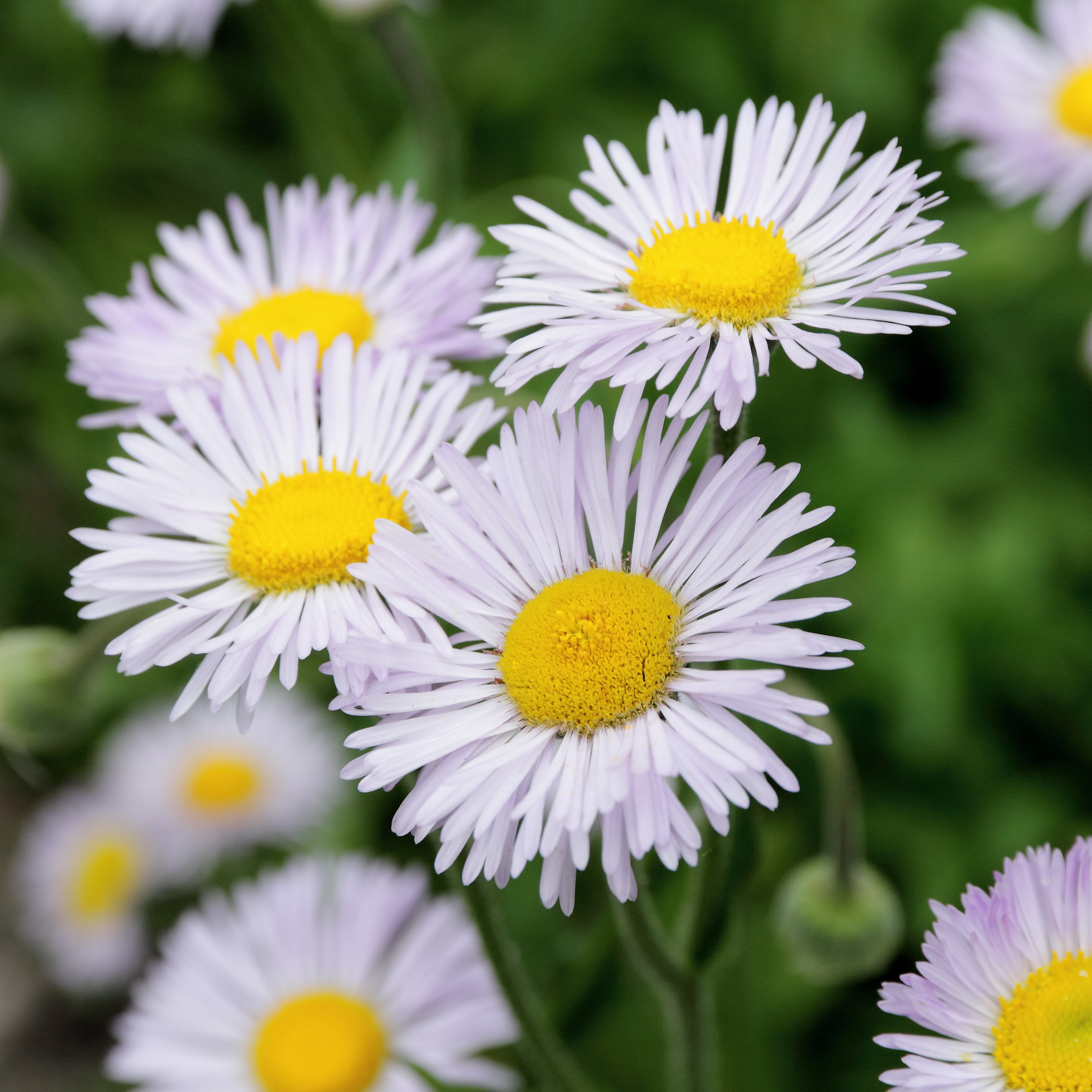

Conservation status
- Secure (NatureServe)

Scientific classification
- Kingdom: Plantae
- Clade: Tracheophytes
- Clade: Angiosperms
- Clade: Eudicots
- Clade: Asterids
- Order: Asterales
- Family: Asteraceae
- Genus: Erigeron
- Species: E. formosissimus

Binomial name
- Erigeron formosissimus Greene

Synonyms
- Synonymy: Erigeron deminutus Wooton & Standl.; Erigeron fruticetorum Rydb.; Erigeron gulielmi Greene; Erigeron hirtuosus Greene; Erigeron iodanthus Greene; Erigeron mogollonicus Greene; Erigeron pecosensis Standl.; Erigeron rubicundus Greene; Erigeron scaberulus Greene; Erigeron smithii Rydb.; Erigeron subasper Greene; Erigeron viscidus Rydb., syn of var. viscidus

= Erigeron formosissimus =

Species of flowering plant

Erigeron formosissimus is a North American species of flowering plants in the family Asteraceae known by the common name beautiful fleabane.

Erigeron formosissimus is native to the western United States. It has been found in Arizona, New Mexico, Utah, Colorado, Wyoming, the Black Hills of South Dakota, eastern Idaho, and southern Montana.

Erigeron formosissimus is a perennial herb up to 55 centimeters (22 inches) in height, spreading by means of underground rhizomes. It produces 1-6 flower heads per stem, each head as many as 150 white, pink, purple, or blue ray florets surrounding numerous yellow disc florets.

Varieties

- Erigeron formosissimus var. viscidus (Rydberg) Cronquist - Arizona, Colorado, New Mexico, South Dakota, Wyoming
- Erigeron formosissimus var. formosissimus - Arizona, Colorado, New Mexico, South Dakota, Utah
