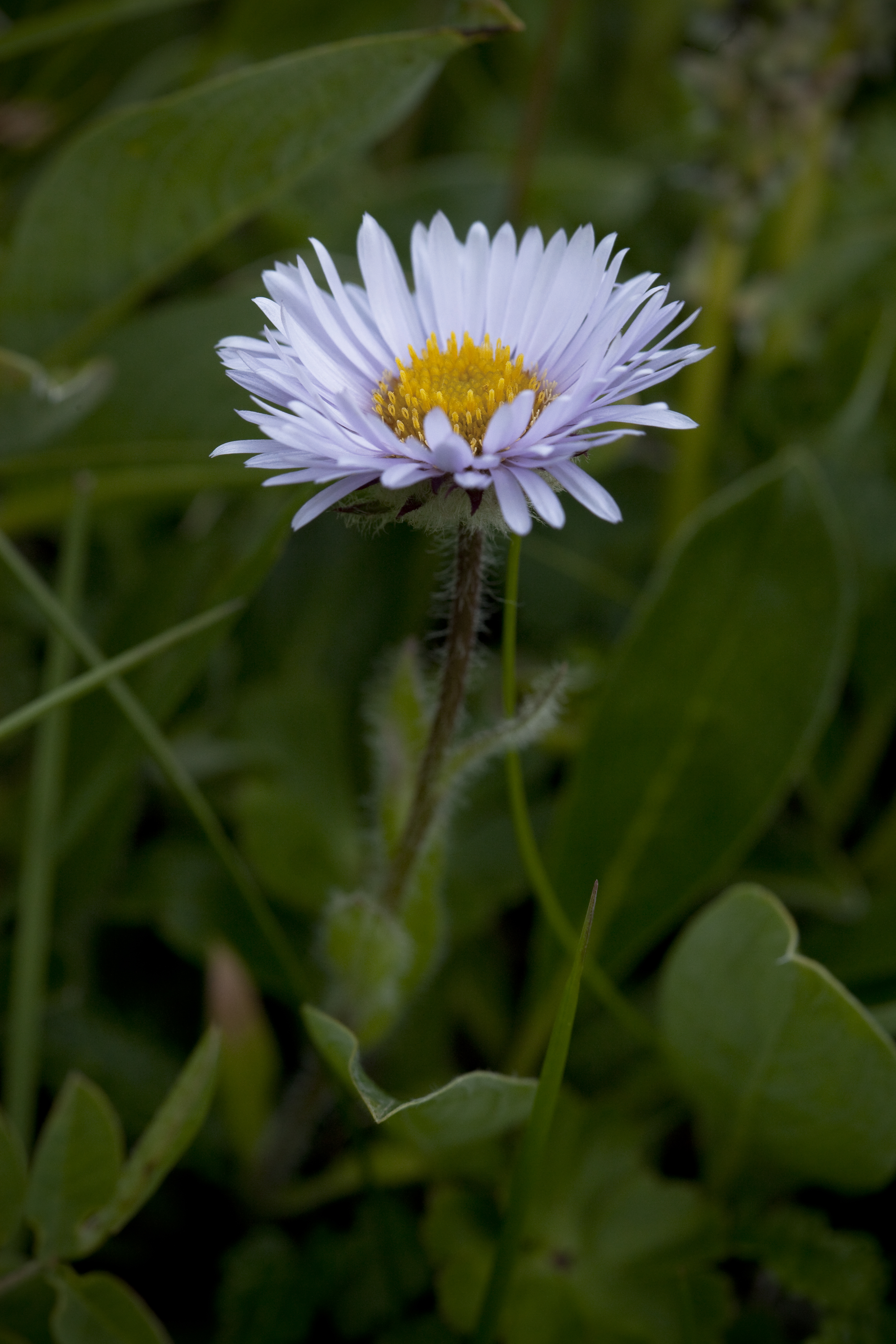

Conservation status
- Secure (NatureServe)

Scientific classification
- Kingdom: Plantae
- Clade: Embryophytes
- Clade: Tracheophytes
- Clade: Angiosperms
- Clade: Eudicots
- Clade: Asterids
- Order: Asterales
- Family: Asteraceae
- Genus: Erigeron
- Species: E. grandiflorus

Binomial name
- Erigeron grandiflorus Hook. 1834 not Nutt. 1834 nor Hoppe ex DC. 1836 nor Sessé & Moc. 1894

Synonyms
- Erigeron simplex Greene

= Erigeron grandiflorus =

Species of flowering plant

Erigeron grandiflorus is a North American species of flowering plant in the family Asteraceae known by the common names Rocky Mountain alpine fleabane and largeflower fleabane.

Erigeron grandiflorus is native to the Rocky Mountains and other nearby mountain ranges of western Canada and the western United States, from Alberta and British Columbia south to New Mexico and Arizona. It grows in meadows, rocky areas, and near timberline.

Erigeron grandiflorus is a perennial herb up to 25 cm (10 inches) tall, spreading by means of underground rhizomes. The plant generally produces only one flower heads per stem. Each head contains as many as 130 blue, pink, white, or purple ray florets surrounding numerous yellow disc florets.
