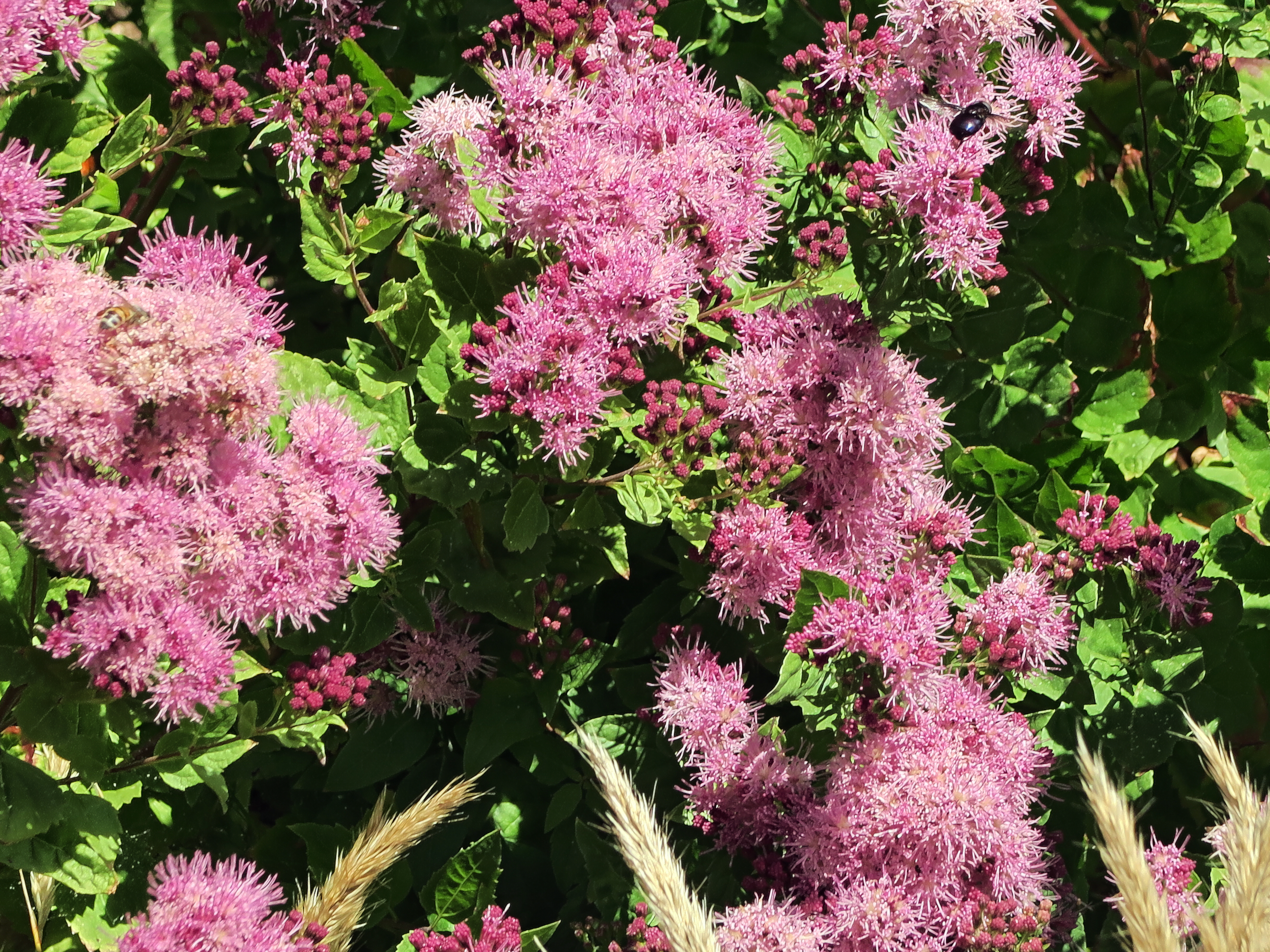
- Regional Parks Botanic Garden; Berkeley, California

Conservation status
- Apparently Secure (NatureServe)

Scientific classification
- Kingdom: Plantae
- Clade: Tracheophytes
- Clade: Angiosperms
- Clade: Eudicots
- Clade: Asterids
- Order: Asterales
- Family: Asteraceae
- Genus: Ageratina
- Species: A. occidentalis

Binomial name
- Ageratina occidentalis (Hook.) King & H.Rob.

Synonyms
- Eupatorium occidentale Hook.; Eupatorium berlandieri A.Gray; Eupatorium oregonum Nutt.; Kyrstenia occidentalis (Hook.) Greene

= Ageratina occidentalis =

Species of flowering plant

Ageratina occidentalis is a species of flowering plant in the family Asteraceae known by the common name western snakeroot or western eupatorium. It is native to the western United States where it grows in several types of habitat. It is found in California, Oregon, Washington, Idaho, Montana, Nevada, and Utah.

Ageratina occidentalis is a rhizomatous perennial herb growing fuzzy green or purple stems to a maximum height near 70 centimeters. Its leaves are glandular and triangular, with serrated edges. The inflorescence is a dense cluster of fuzzy flower heads containing long, protruding disc florets in shades of white, pink, and blue. There are no ray florets. The fruit is an achene a few millimeters long with a rough, bristly pappus.

== Etymology ==
Ageratina is derived from Greek meaning 'un-aging', in reference to the flowers keeping their color for a long time. This name was used by Dioscorides for a number of different plants.

The name Eupatorium comes from the Greek king Mithridates VI Eupator, who is said to have discovered that a species in the genus could be used as an antidote to a common poison.
