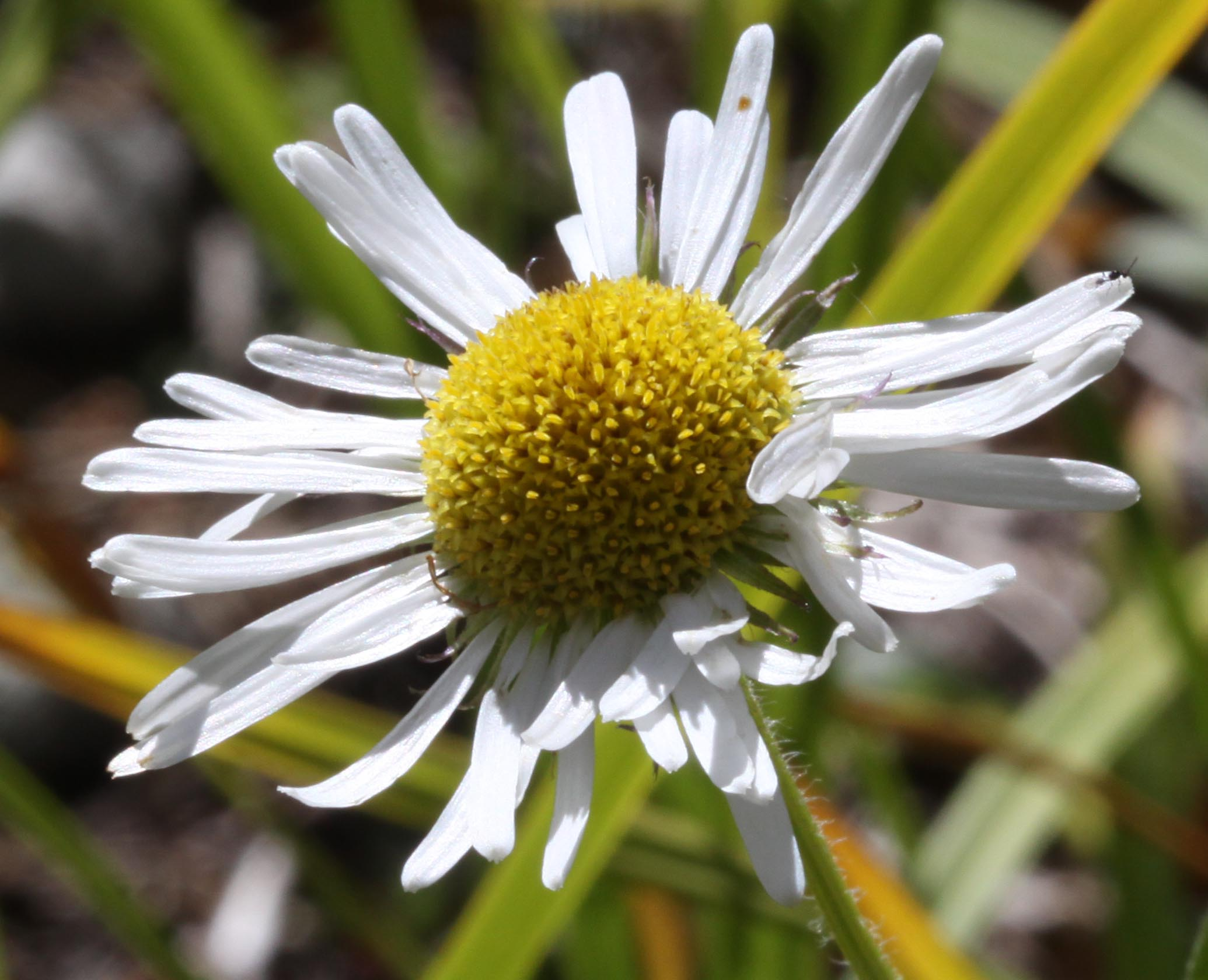

Conservation status
- Secure (NatureServe)

Scientific classification
- Kingdom: Plantae
- Clade: Tracheophytes
- Clade: Angiosperms
- Clade: Eudicots
- Clade: Asterids
- Order: Asterales
- Family: Asteraceae
- Genus: Erigeron
- Species: E. coulteri

Binomial name
- Erigeron coulteri Porter

Synonyms
- Erigeron frondeus Greene; Erigeron leucanthemoides Greene; Erigeron lucidus Greene

= Erigeron coulteri =

Species of flowering plant

Erigeron coulteri is a species of flowering plant in the family Asteraceae known by the common names large mountain fleabane, Coulter's fleabane, and Coulter's daisy.

Erigeron coulteri is native to much of the western United States where it grows in moist forests and meadows. It has been found in California, Nevada, Colorado, New Mexico, Wyoming, Montana, Oregon, and Idaho, though there are large stretches of land in between known populations.

Erigeron coulteri is a perennial herb reaching maximum heights of 20-70 centimeters (8-28 inches). It has an erect stem which may have a few branches or none. There are leaves on its stem as well as at its base. The long leaves are somewhat lance-shaped to more rounded, and sometimes have a few teeth along the edges. The inflorescence atop the stem has one to four flower heads, each between one and two centimeters (0.4-0.8 inches) wide. The center is packed with tiny golden yellow disc florets and the circumference is fringed with up to 140 white ray florets.
