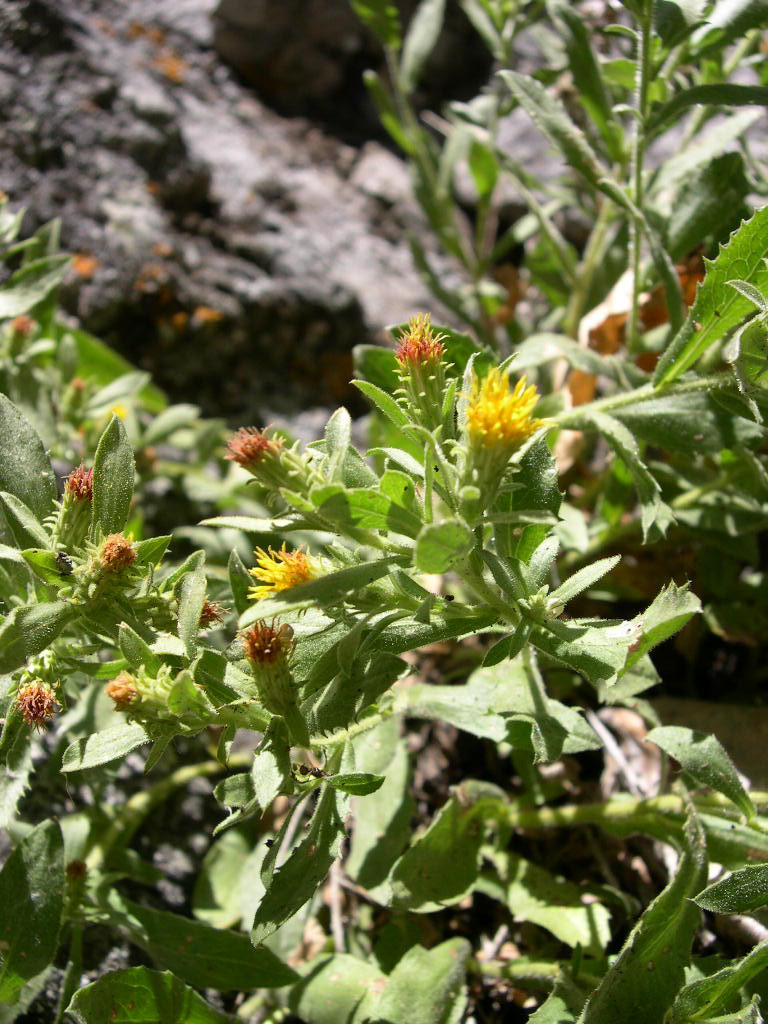
- Haplopappus aberrans in Idaho

Scientific classification
- Kingdom: Plantae
- Clade: Tracheophytes
- Clade: Angiosperms
- Clade: Eudicots
- Clade: Asterids
- Order: Asterales
- Family: Asteraceae
- Subfamily: Asteroideae
- Tribe: Astereae
- Subtribe: Machaerantherinae
- Genus: Triniteurybia; Brouillet, Urbatsch & R.P.Roberts
- Species: T. aberrans

Binomial name
- Triniteurybia aberrans (A.Nelson) Brouillet, Urbatsch & R.P.Roberts

Synonyms
- Macronema aberrans A.Nelson; Tonestus aberrans (A.Nelson) G.L.Nesom & D.R.Morgan; Haplopappus aberrans (A.Nelson) H.M.Hall; Sideranthus aberrans (A.Nelson) Rydb.

= Triniteurybia =

Genus of flowering plants

Triniteurybia aberrans, the Idaho goldenweed, is a species of flowering plant in the tribe Astereae within the family Asteraceae. It is the only species in the genus Triniteurybia.

Triniteurybia aberrans is native to the United States, in the Sawtooth Mountains of Idaho and the Bitterroot Range of Montana.
