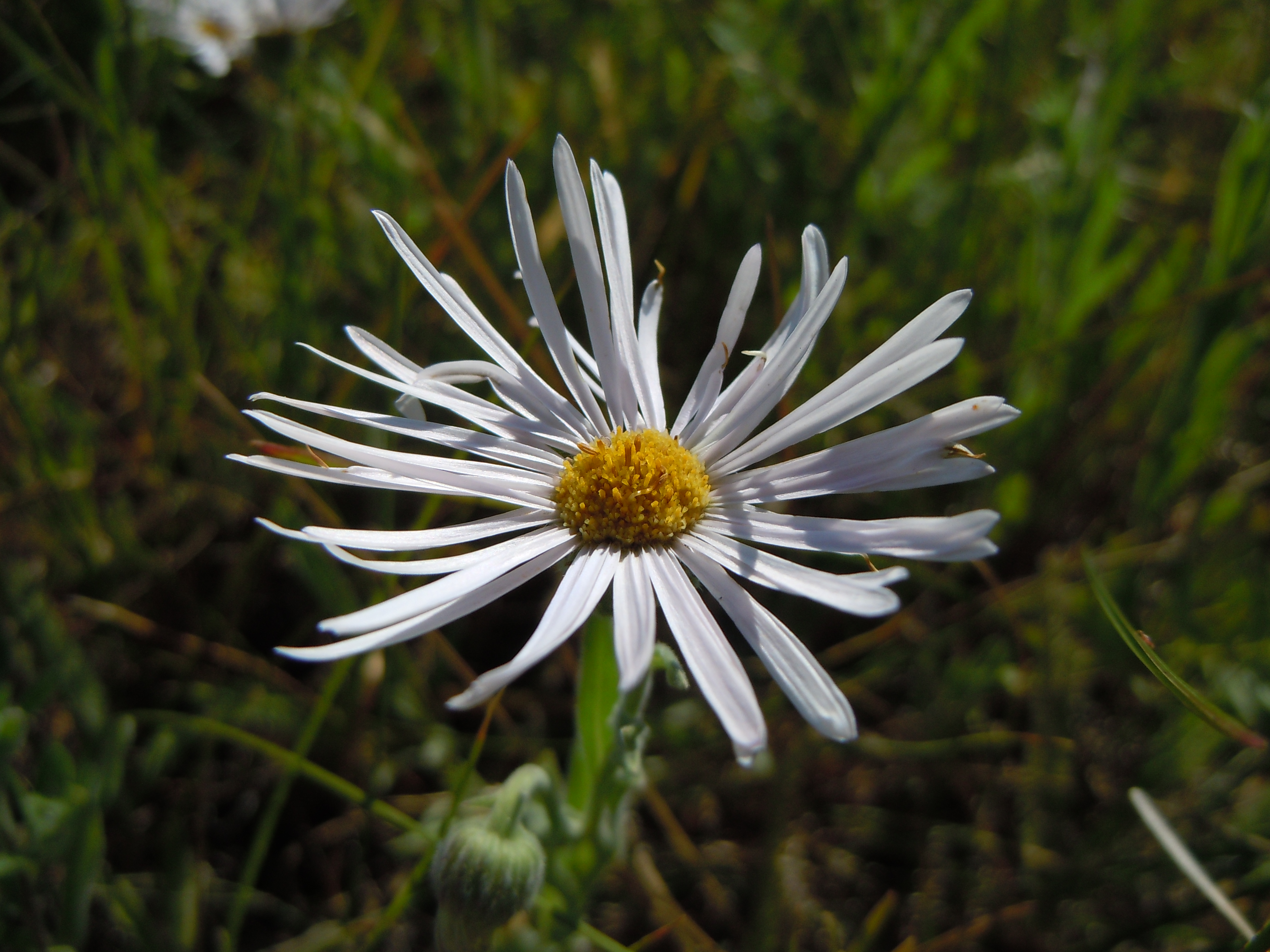

Conservation status
- Secure (NatureServe)

Scientific classification
- Kingdom: Plantae
- Clade: Tracheophytes
- Clade: Angiosperms
- Clade: Eudicots
- Clade: Asterids
- Order: Asterales
- Family: Asteraceae
- Genus: Erigeron
- Species: E. caespitosus

Binomial name
- Erigeron caespitosus Nutt.

Synonyms
- Erigeron caespitosum Nutt.; Diplopappus grandiflorus Hook.; Erigeron caespitosus var. grandiflorus (Hook.) Torr. & A.Gray; Erigeron caespitosus var. laccoliticus M.E.Jones; Erigeron canescens (Hook.) Torr. & A.Gray 1841 not Hook. & Arn. 1836; Erigeron subcanescens Rydb.

= Erigeron caespitosus =

Species of flowering plant

Erigeron caespitosus is a North American species of flowering plants in the family Asteraceae known by the common name tufted fleabane. It is native to western Canada (Yukon, British Columbia, Alberta, Saskatchewan, Manitoba) and the United States (Alaska and mountains of the western United States, primarily the Rockies, as far south as Arizona and New Mexico)

Erigeron caespitosus is a perennial herb up to 30 cm (12 inches) tall, forming clumps over a taproot and usually covered with stiff hairs. One plant will produce numerous flower heads in groups of 1–4 at the ends of upper branches. Each head contains as many as 100 white or blue ray florets surrounding many small yellow disc florets.
