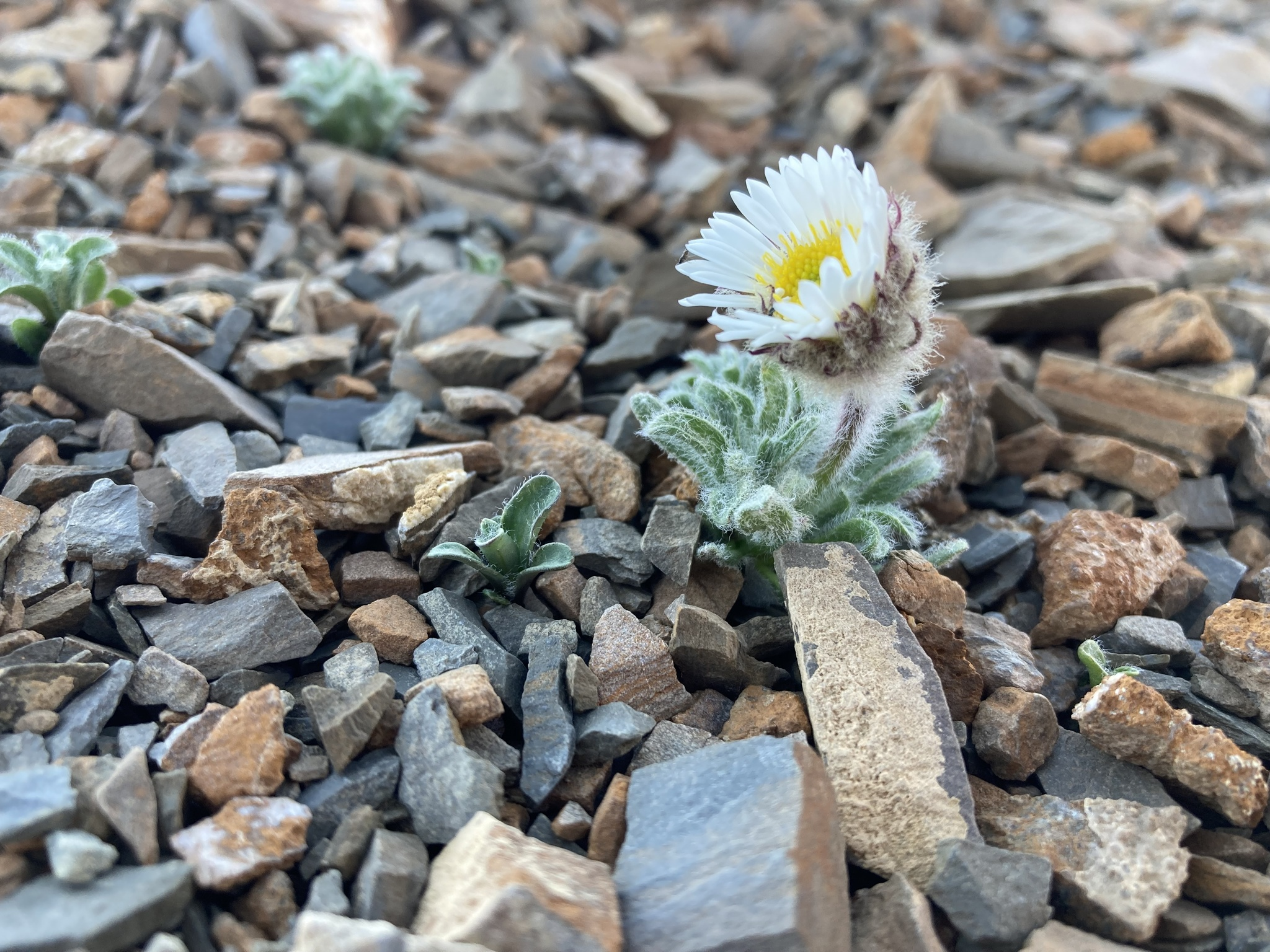

Conservation status
- Apparently Secure (NatureServe)

Scientific classification
- Kingdom: Plantae
- Clade: Tracheophytes
- Clade: Angiosperms
- Clade: Eudicots
- Clade: Asterids
- Order: Asterales
- Family: Asteraceae
- Genus: Erigeron
- Species: E. lanatus

Binomial name
- Erigeron lanatus Hook.

Synonyms
- Erigeron grandiflorus var. lanatus (Hook.) A.Gray

= Erigeron lanatus =

Species of flowering plant

Erigeron lanatus is a species of flowering plant in the family Asteraceae known by the common name woolly fleabane. It is native to western North America, where it occurs in the mountains straddling the border between British Columbia and Alberta and Montana, with isolated populations occurring as far north as Yukon and as far south as Colorado.

Erigeron lanatus is a small perennial herb growing just a few centimeters tall. The leaves are mostly basal, each roughly lance-shaped and up to 3 centimeters (1.2 inches) long. They are coated in loose, woolly fibers. The inflorescence is made up of one flower head with white or purple-tinged ray florets measuring about 1 centimeter (0.4 inches) long. The head is lined with hairy purple or purple-tipped phyllaries. Blooming occurs in July and August. The head is an achene with a pappus of bristles.

Erigeron lanatus grows in high-elevation subalpine and alpine climates. It is most often found growing in limestone scree. It has been seen growing with Siberian aster (Aster sibiricus) and starwort (Stellaria americana).

Hiking and mining may threaten this species in some areas.
