= Erigeron flabellifolius =

Scientific classification
- Kingdom: Plantae
- Clade: Tracheophytes
- Clade: Angiosperms
- Clade: Eudicots
- Clade: Asterids
- Order: Asterales
- Family: Asteraceae
- Genus: Erigeron
- Species: E. flabellifolius

Binomial name
- Erigeron flabellifolius Rydb.

Species of flowering plant

Erigeron flabellifolius is a rare North American species of flowering plants in the family Asteraceae known by the common names fan-leaf fleabane .

Erigeron flabellifolius is native to the mountains in the vicinity of Yellowstone National Park and Grand Teton National Park in Montana and Wyoming. It grows at high elevations on cliffs, rockslides, and alpine meadows.

Erigeron flabellifolius is a tiny perennial herb rarely more than 8 centimeters (3.2 inches) in height. Most of the leaves are clustered around the base of the stems. They are fan-shaped, narrowed at the base, triangular or 3-lobed at the far end. Each stem usually produces only 1 flower head per stem. Each head contains as many as 70 white, pink, or lavender ray florets surrounding numerous yellow disc florets.
