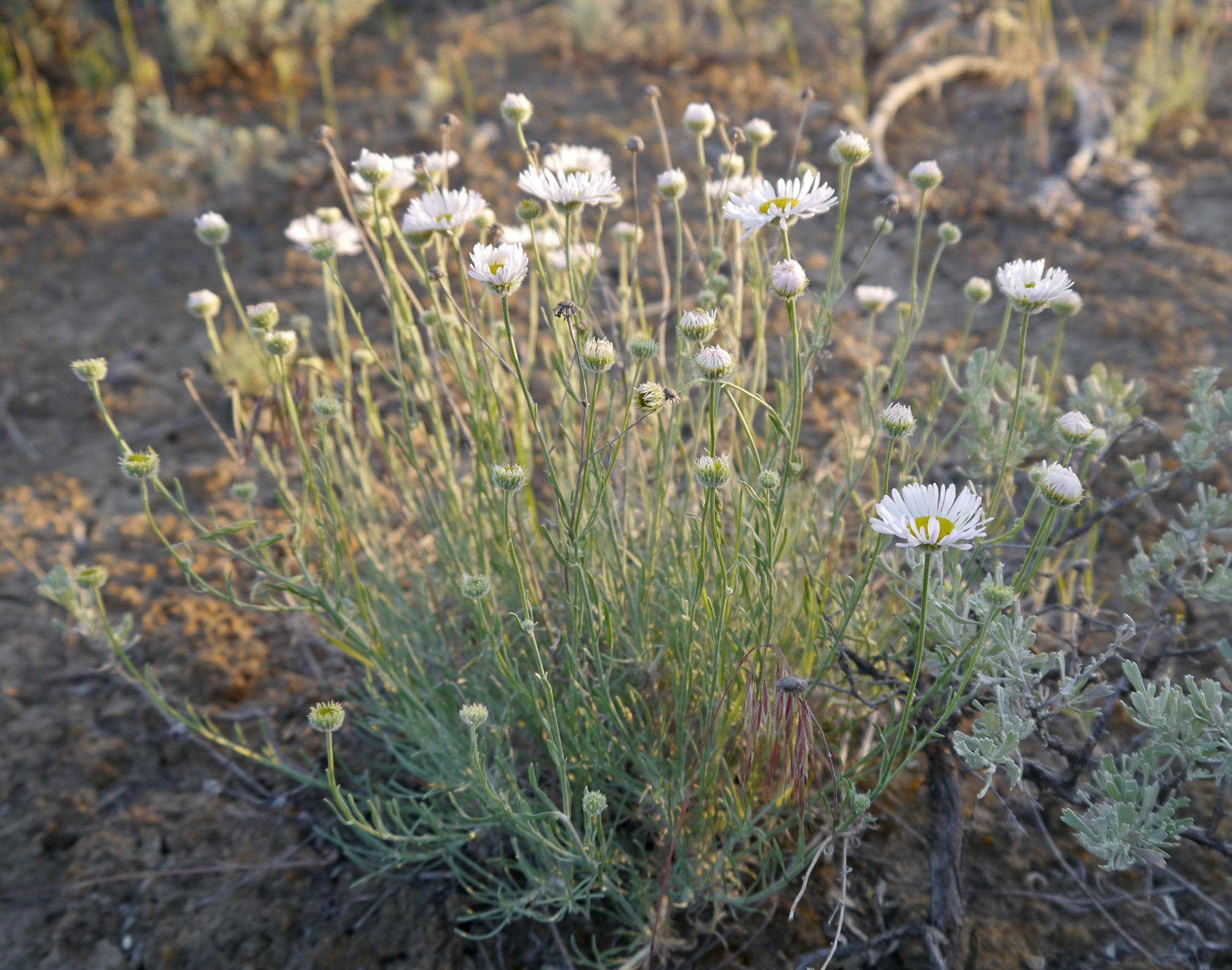

Scientific classification
- Kingdom: Plantae
- Clade: Tracheophytes
- Clade: Angiosperms
- Clade: Eudicots
- Clade: Asterids
- Order: Asterales
- Family: Asteraceae
- Genus: Erigeron
- Species: E. filifolius

Binomial name
- Erigeron filifolius (Hook.) Nutt.

Synonyms
- Erigeron filifolium (Hook.) Nutt.; Chrysopsis canescens DC.; Diplopappus filifolius Hook.; Diplostephium filifolium (Vent.) Nees; Diplostephium teretifolium (Less.) Nees

= Erigeron filifolius =

Species of flowering plant

Erigeron filifolius is a North American species of flowering plants in the family Asteraceae known by the common names thread-leaf fleabane.

Erigeron filifolius is widespread across much of western North America. It has been found in western Canada (British Columbia) and the western United States, primarily east of the crest of the Cascade Range of Washington, Oregon, and northern California extending eastward to southern Idaho and northeast Nevada. Within its distribution, it occupies a large range of elevations from near sea level to 2,400 m (8,000 ft).

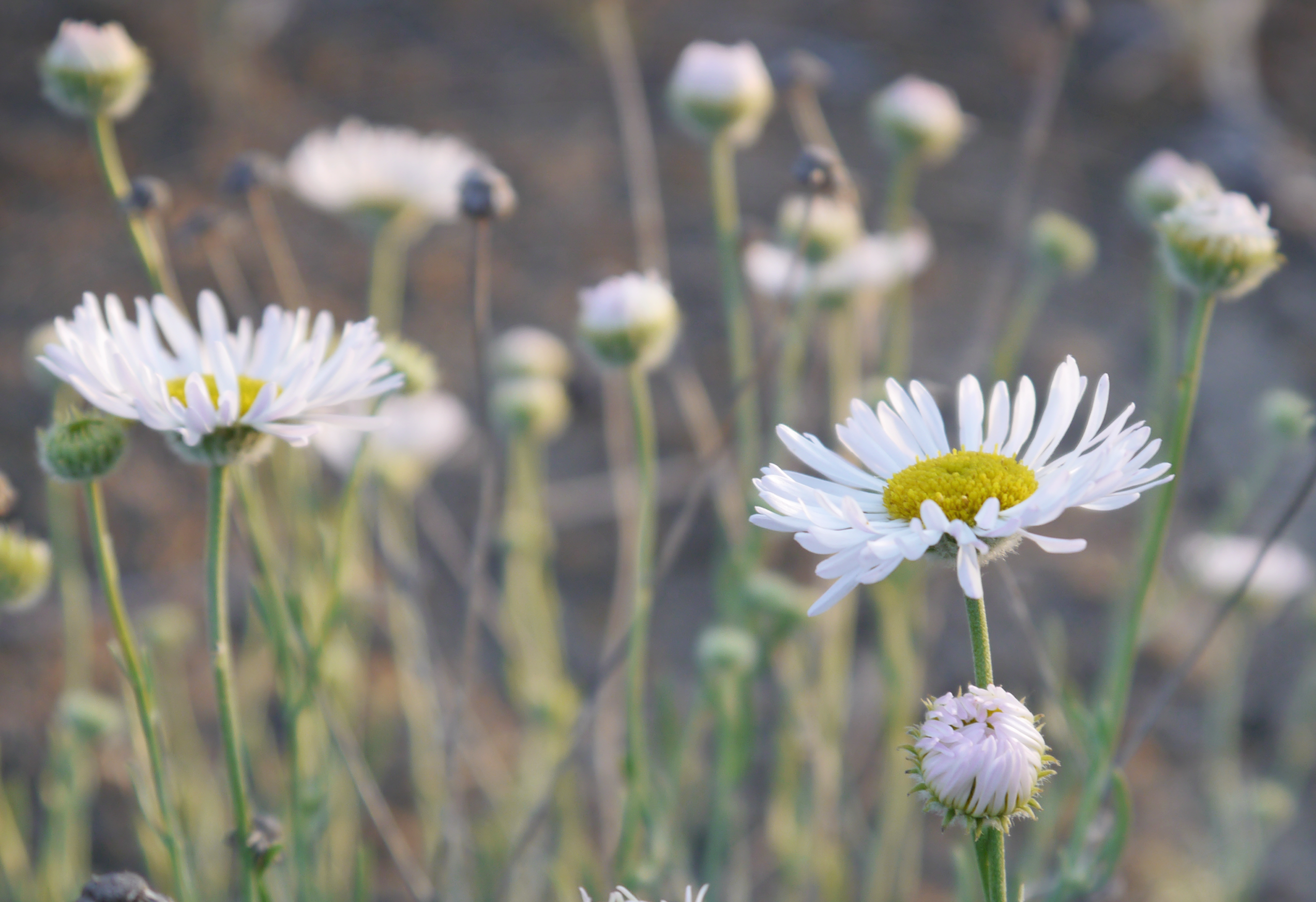

Erigeron filifolius is a branched perennial herb up to 50 cm (20 in) in height. Leaves are long and thin, often thread-like, up to 8 cm (3 in) long. Each stem sometimes produces only 1 flower head per stem, sometimes flat-topped clusters of 10 or more. Each head may contain as many as 125 white, blue, pink, or lavender ray florets surrounding numerous yellow disc florets.
