= Erigeron floribundus =

Scientific classification
- Kingdom: Plantae
- Clade: Embryophytes
- Clade: Tracheophytes
- Clade: Angiosperms
- Clade: Eudicots
- Clade: Asterids
- Order: Asterales
- Family: Asteraceae
- Genus: Erigeron
- Species: E. floribundus

Binomial name
- Erigeron floribundus (Kunth) Sch.Bip. Synonym list: Conyza floribunda Kunth; Conyza sumatrensis var. floribunda (Kunth) J.B.Marshall; Conyza albida Willd. ex Spreng.; Conyza bilbaoana J.Rémy; Conyza bonariensis var. leiotheca (S.F.Blake) Cuatrec.; Conyza elata Kunth & C.D.Bouché; Conyza floribunda var. laciniata Cabrera ex G.M.Barroso; Conyza floribunda var. linearifolia P.D.Sell; Conyza myriocephala J.Rémy; Conyza sumatrensis var. leiotheca (S.F.Blake) Pruski & G.Sancho; Erigeron albidus (Willd. ex Spreng.) A.Gray; Erigeron bilbaoanus (J.Rémy) Cabrera; Erigeron bonariensis var. leiothecus S.F.Blake; Erigeron myriocephalus (J.Rémy) Herter; Marsea bonariensis var. leiotheca (S.F.Blake) V.M.Badillo

Species of flowering plant in the daisy family

Erigeron floribundus is an annual/biennial plant native to South America to Mexico and introduced to many parts of the world. Its common names include tall fleabane, Bilbao's fleabane, and many-flowered fleabane.

== Description ==
Erigeron floribundus is a tall annual/biennia,l to 1.5 m 1.5 m (4.9 ft), with a rather hairy stems and a multitude of small flower heads (c. 5 mm tall) displayed in a slightly loose branched inflorescence widening above. The flower heads have slight, but not conspicuous, ray petals that are sometimes purple-tinged with sides that are approximately hairless and 5–6(7) inner phyllaries across. Its leaves have some projecting hairs at the base and forward-pointing hairs at the tip that tend to lean into the leaf margin, the surfaces with only sparse hairs.

Similar globally-spreading species with unhairy flower heads include E. canadensis, which has short ray petals conspicuous (generally a sufficient feature when in flower), always white (not sometimes purpled), the inflorescence rather cylindrical (rather than widening above), leaf margin bases usually with more long projecting hairs, leaf margin tips with forward hairs (not turning in to leaf), flower head side phyllaries more numerous (8–12, not 5–7).

== Taxonomy ==
Older literature such as the Flora of Turkey may quote Conyza albida Willd. ex Spreng. intending what is now E. sumatrensis Retz., and should be taken as such; likewise other literature references may do so; the type has subsequently been revised and Conyza albida Willd. ex Spreng. is now viewed as a synonym for Erigeron floribundus.

== Distribution ==
South America to Mexico, and introduced to many parts of the world (W. Europe, CW Africa, Madagascar, Australia, SE Asia).

== Photographic description ==
- Photographs from Edinburgh (Scotland)
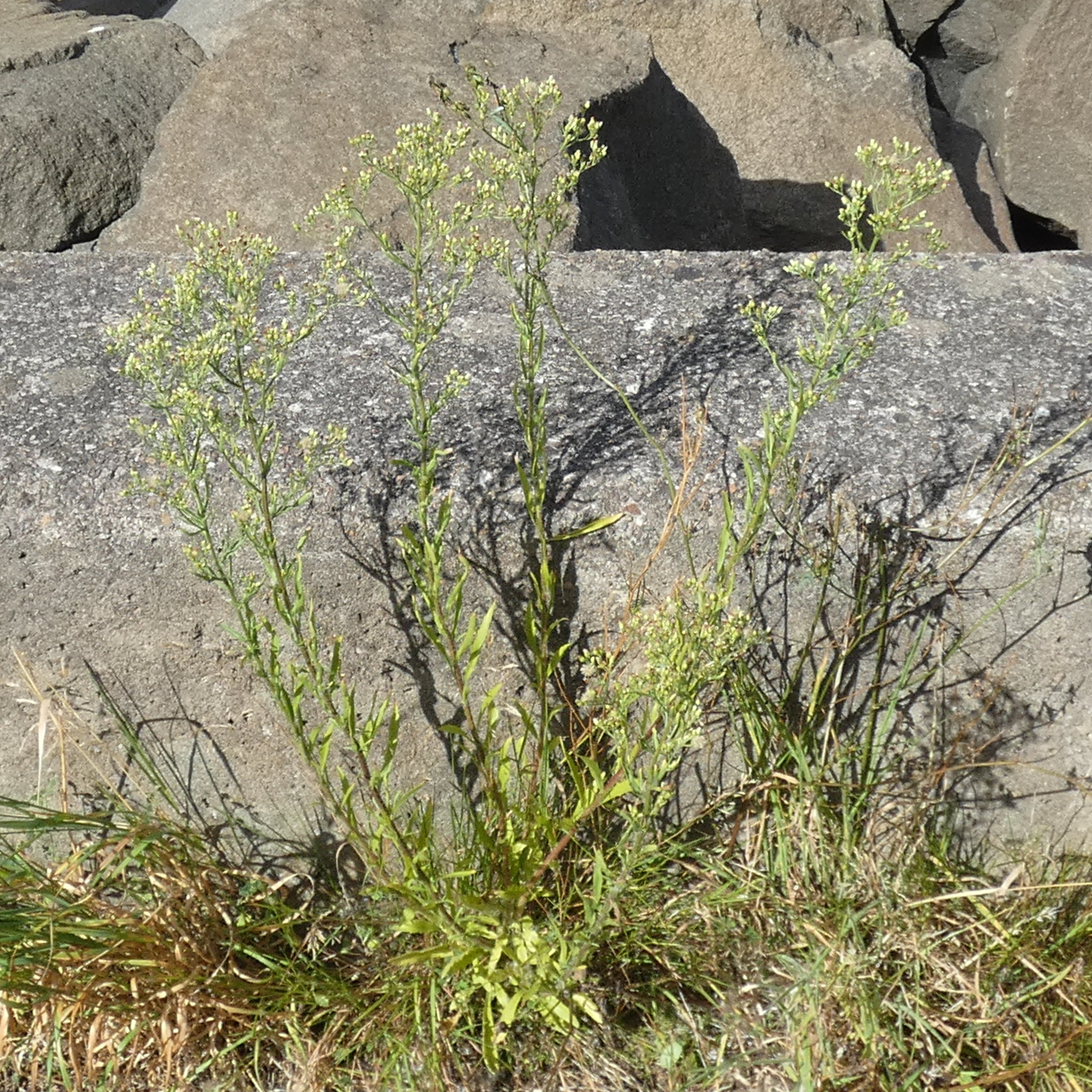
Inflorescences widening above (not cylindrical)

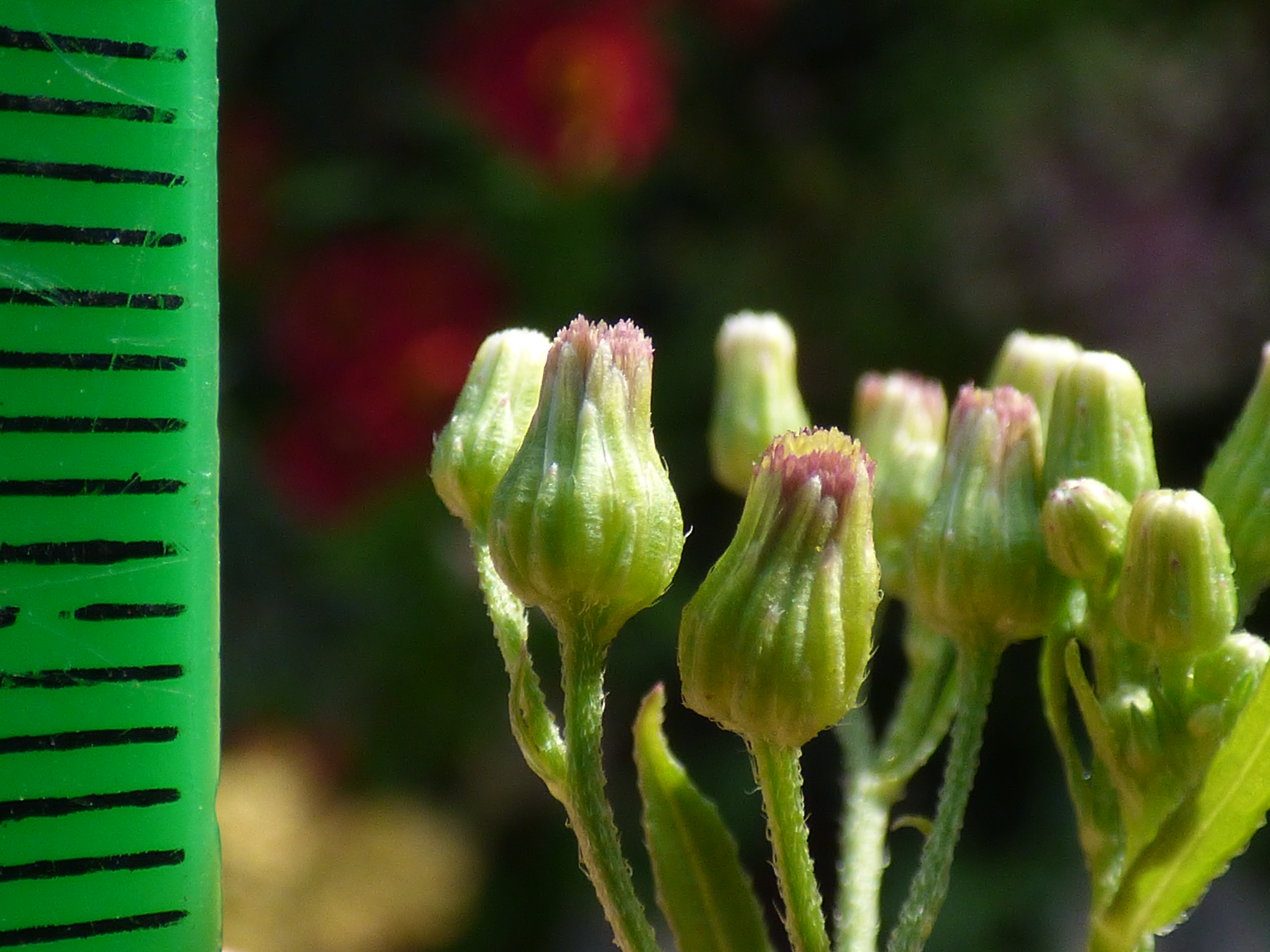
Flower heads with few (5–6(7)) inner phyllaries at the sides, unhairy or sparsely so, petals poorly protruding, often having a purpled tinge.

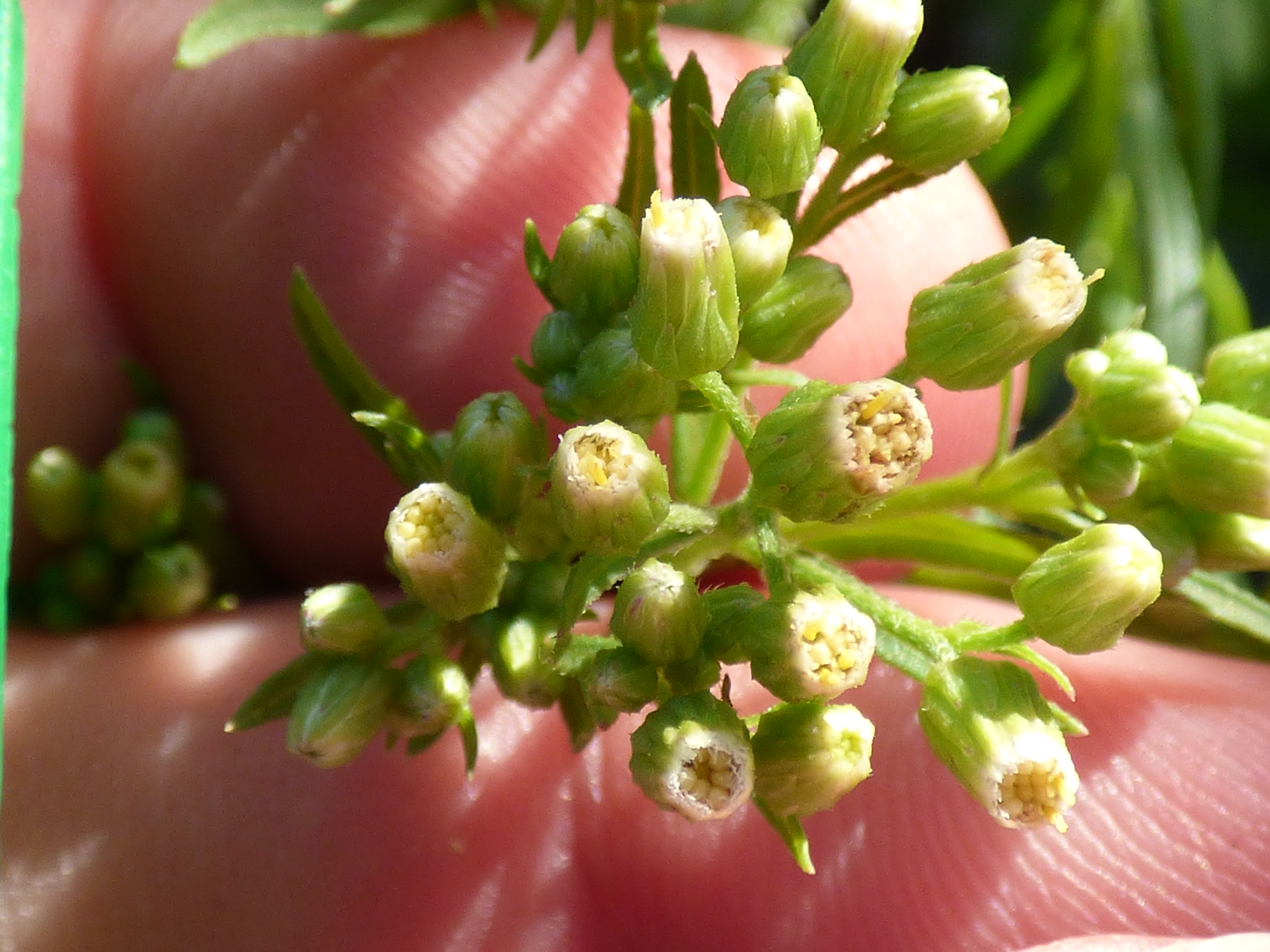
Flower heads from above

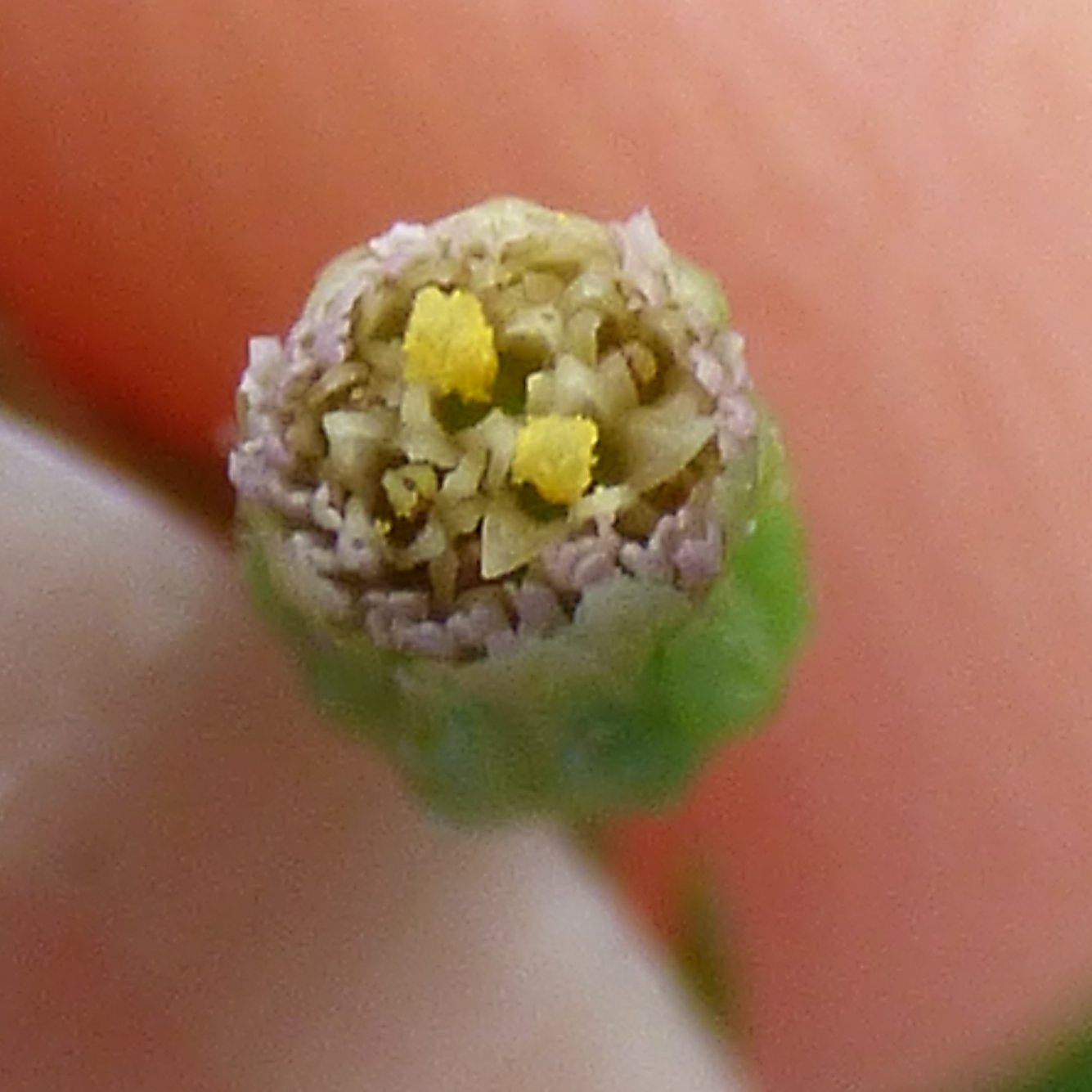
Individual flower head close up showing some individual flowers with 5 petals and inner organs, and purple tinge

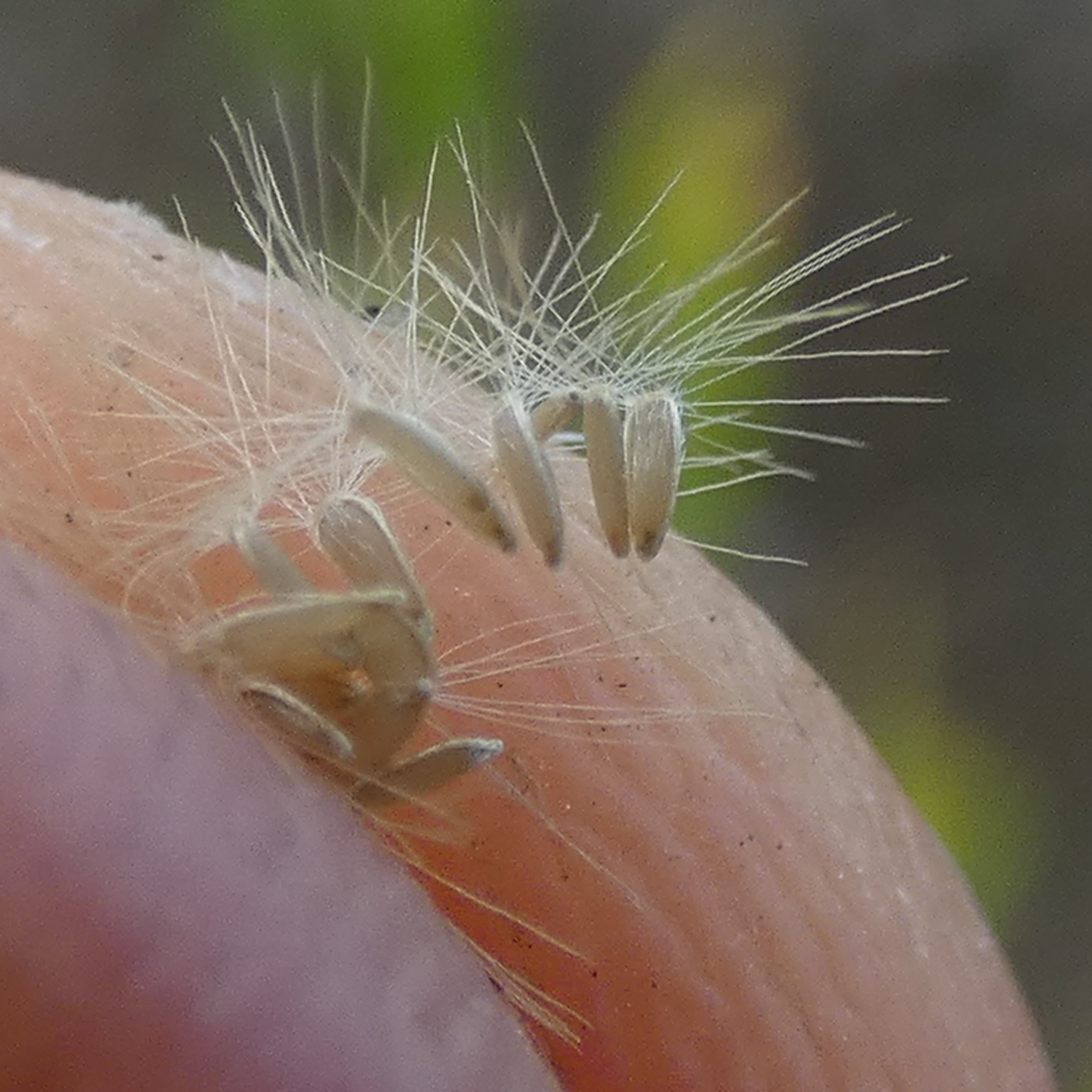
Matured flower with seeds and pappus

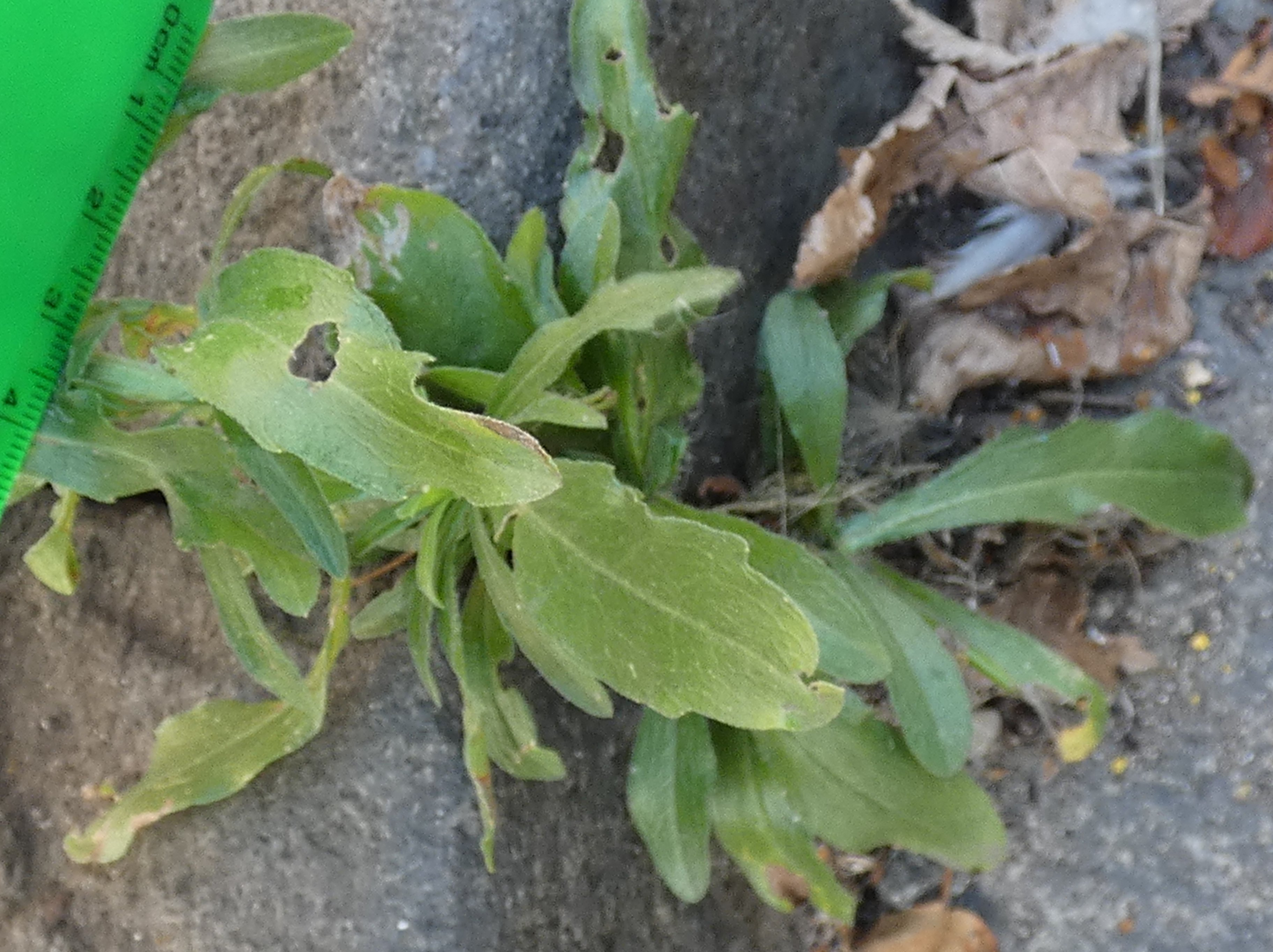
Lower leaves somewhat wavy-edged

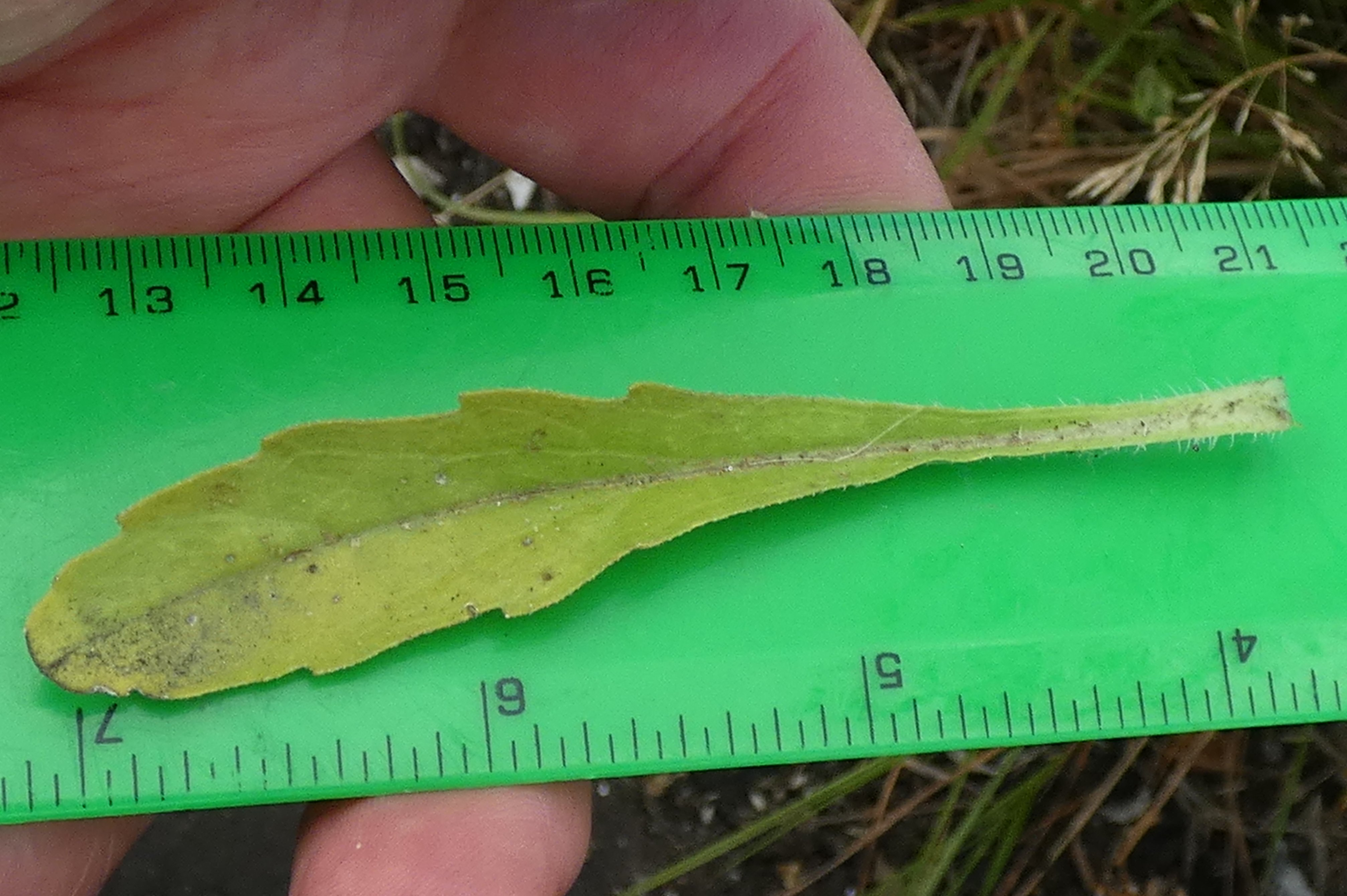
Leaf

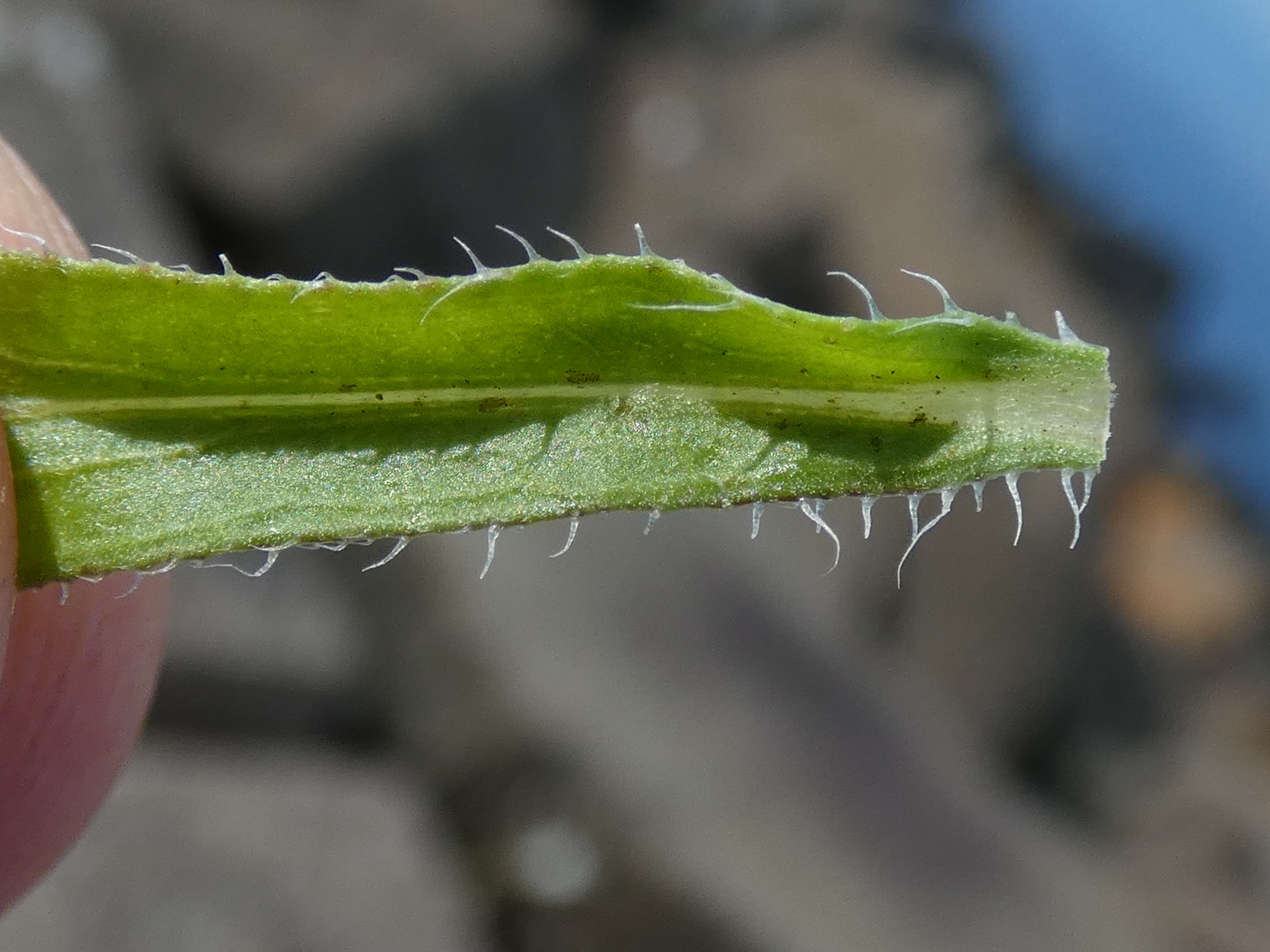
Leaf bases have some long margin hairs

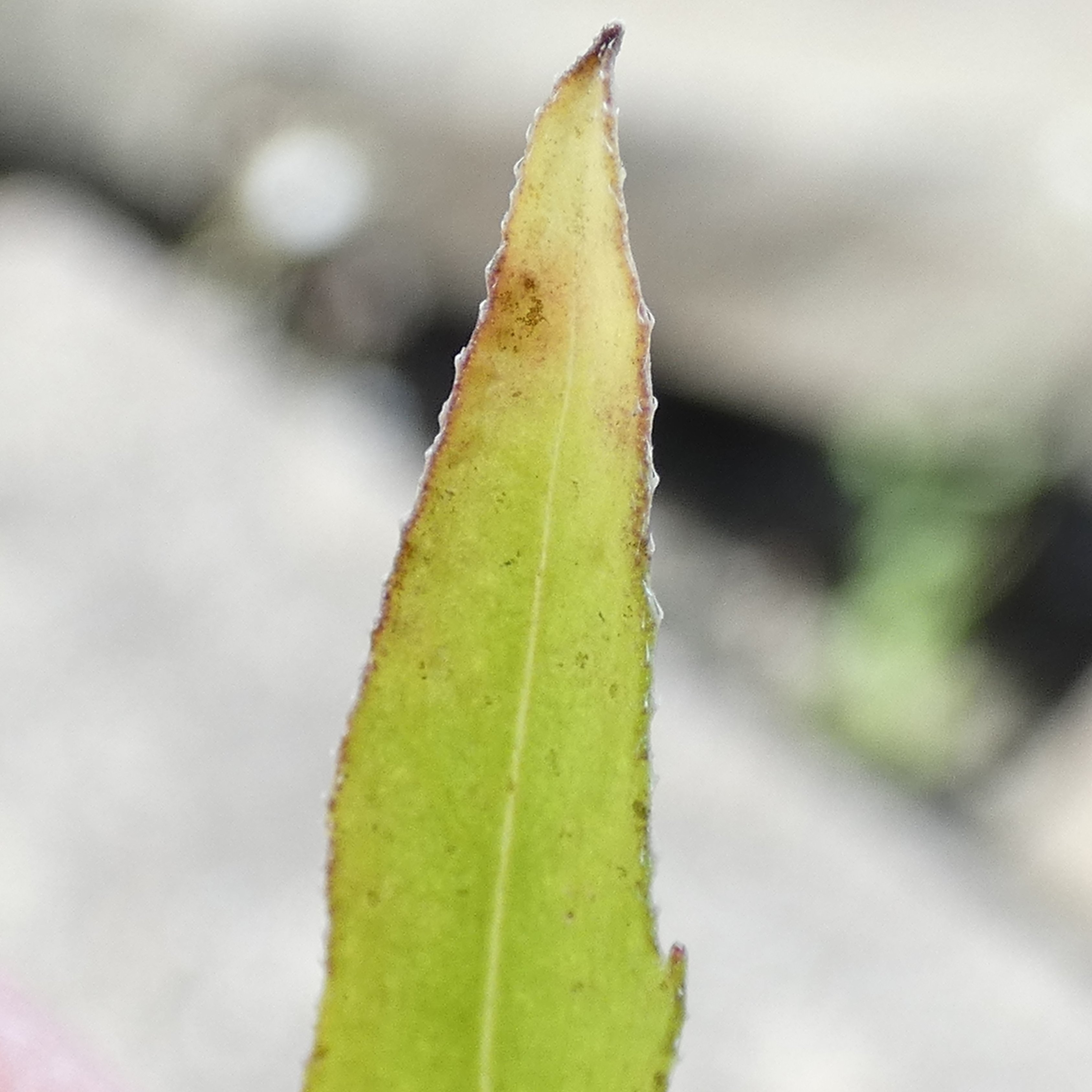
Leaf tips with forward hairs curling in

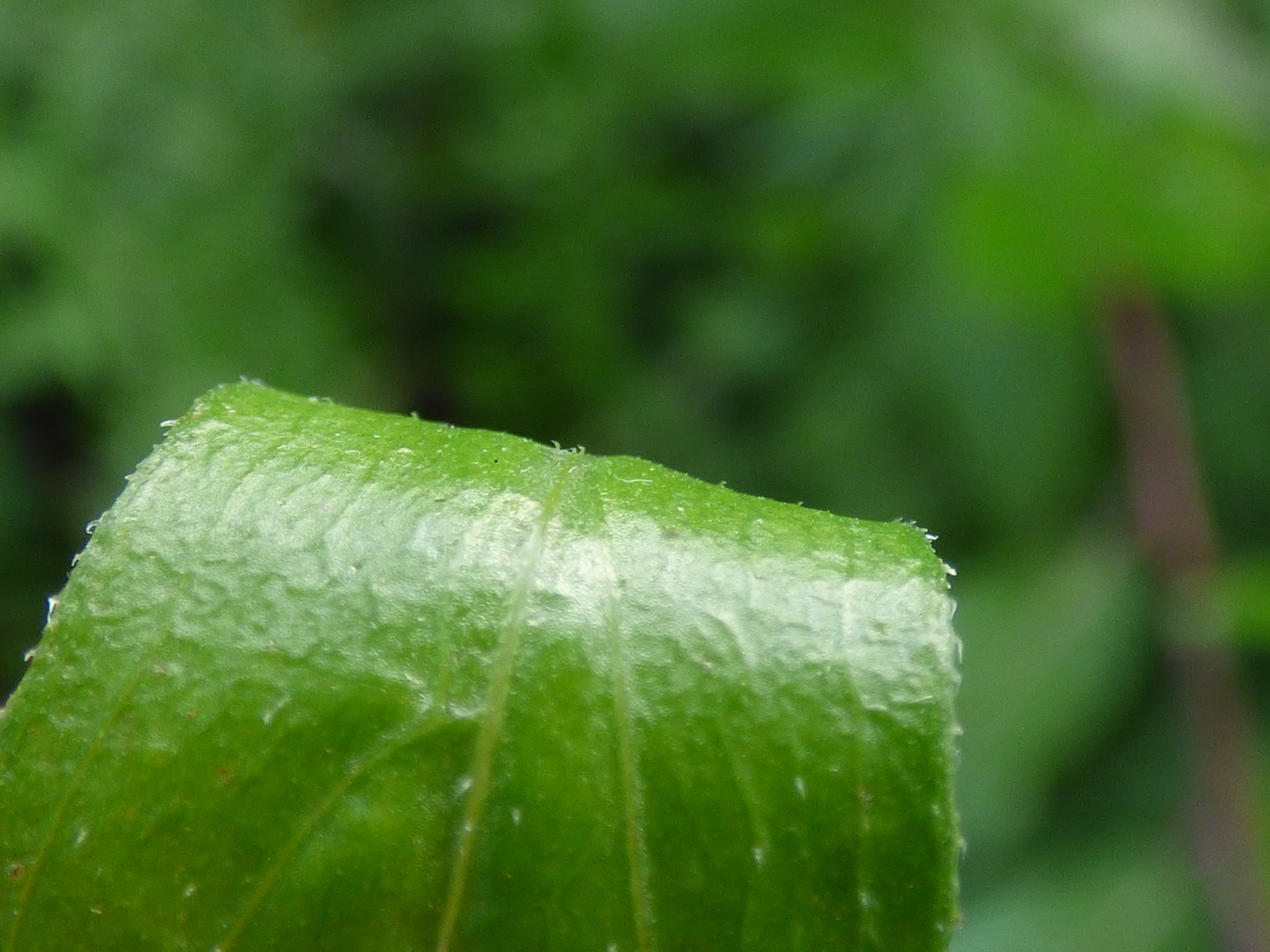
Upper leaf surface not very hairy, with a shine

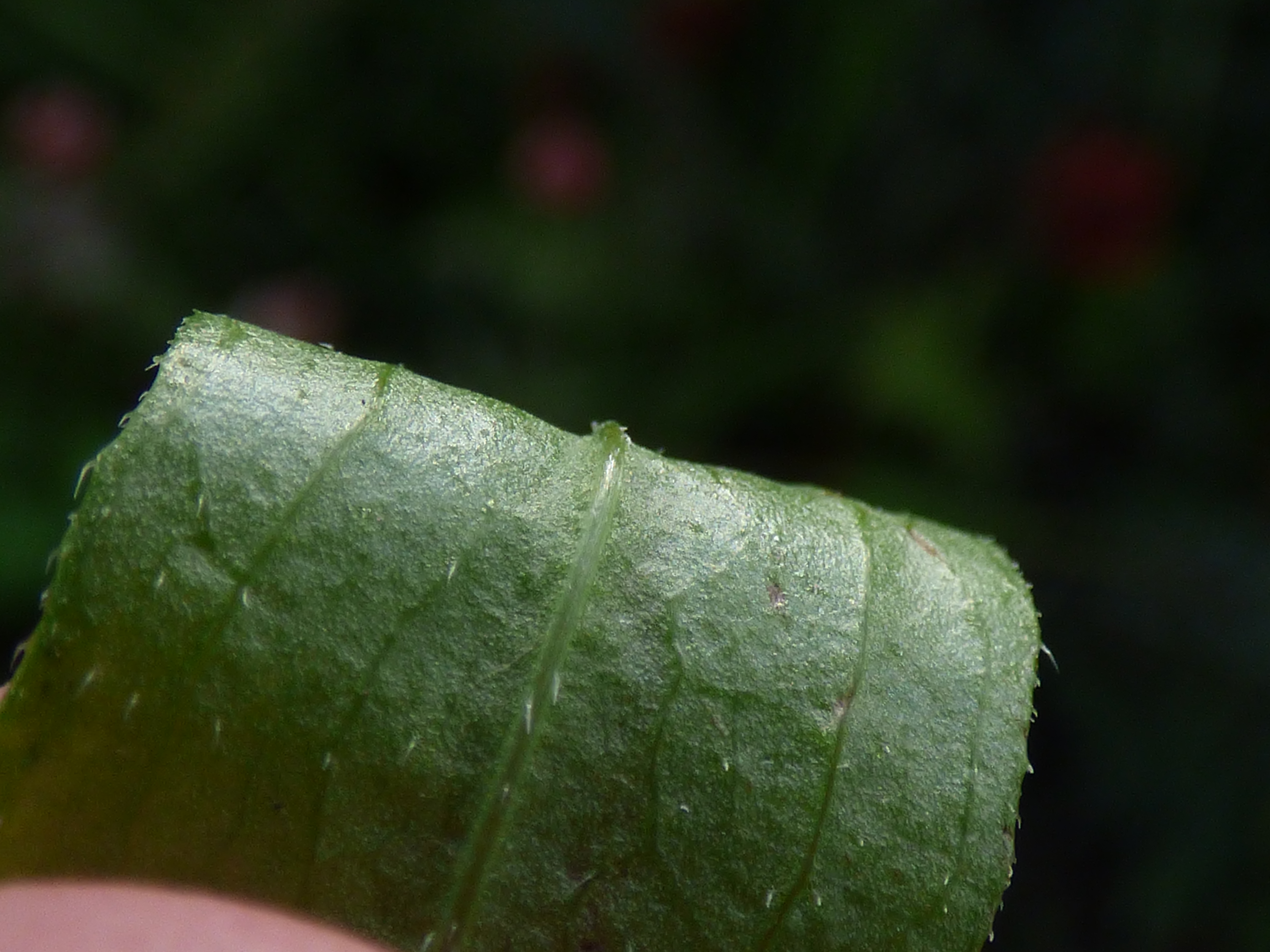
Lower leaf surface not very hairy

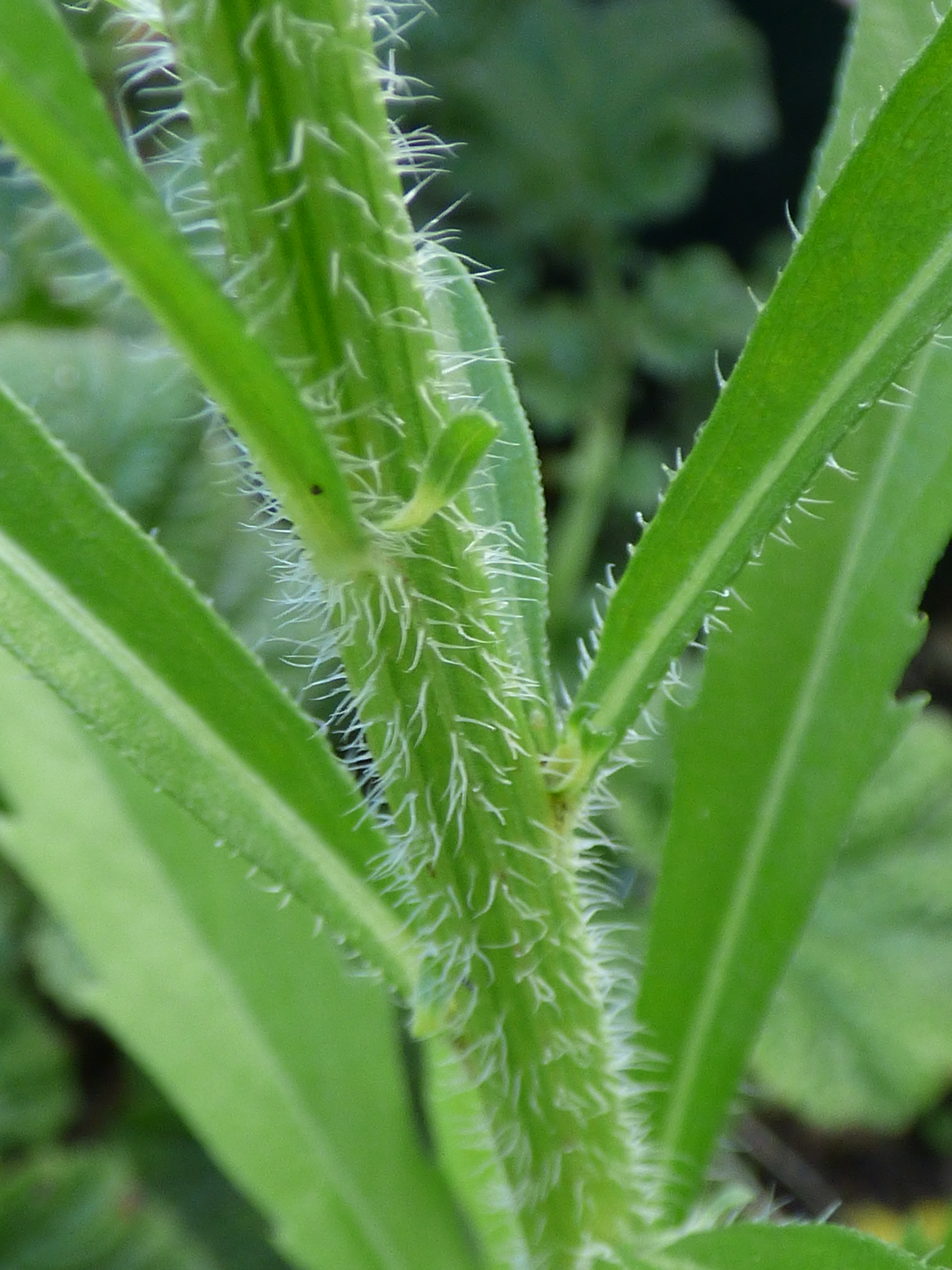
Stem somewhat coarsely hairy (hairs rather bulbous-based)

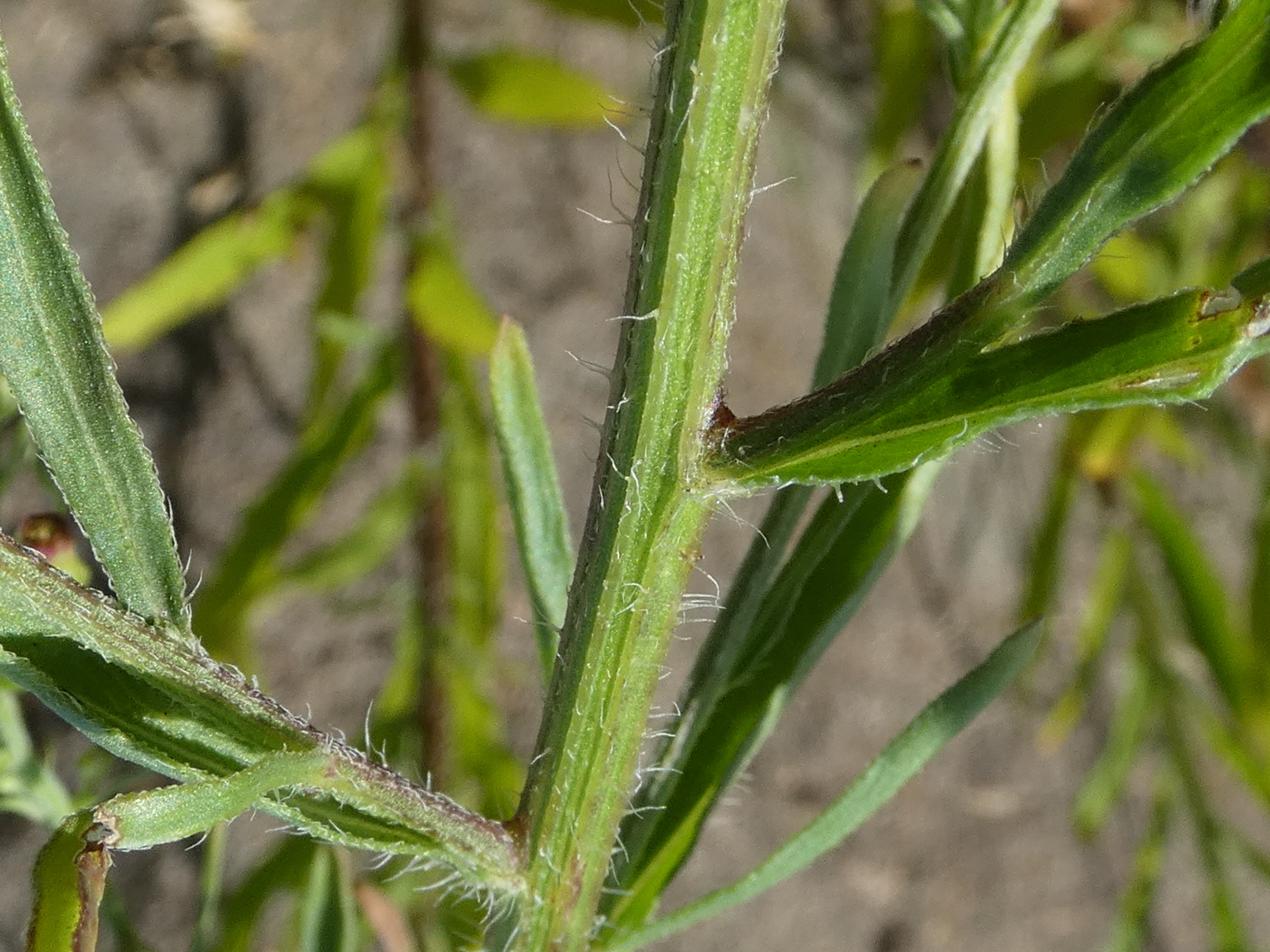
A mid-stem appearance

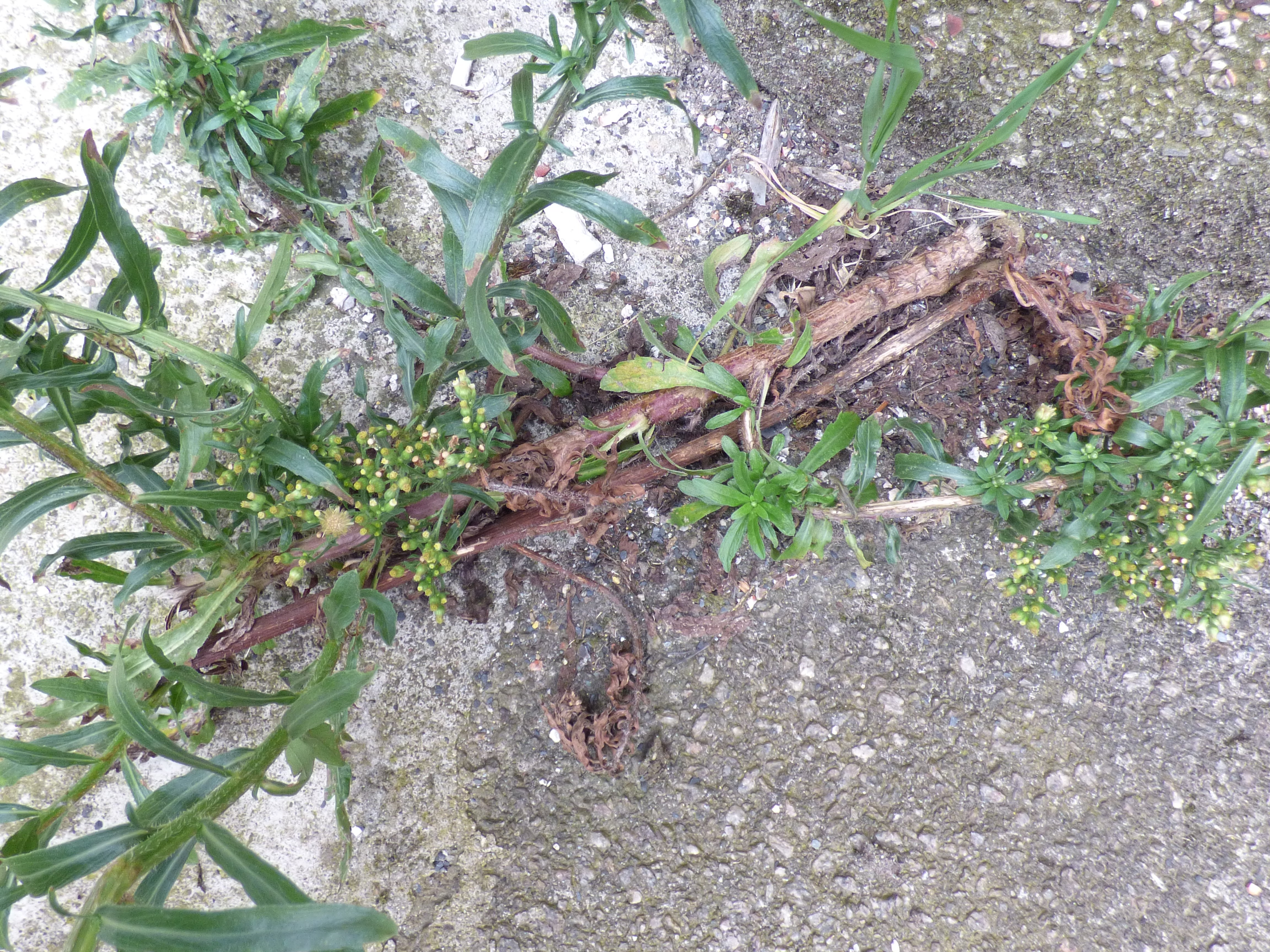
Biennual form with hardening stem and more erratic vegetative production
