= Rock fleabane =

Rock fleabane is a common name for several plants and may refer to:

- Erigeron saxatilis
- Erigeron scopulinus, native to the southwestern United States
