= Rochonia =

Scientific classification
- Kingdom: Plantae
- Clade: Tracheophytes
- Clade: Angiosperms
- Clade: Eudicots
- Clade: Asterids
- Order: Asterales
- Family: Asteraceae
- Subfamily: Asteroideae
- Tribe: Astereae
- Subtribe: Madagasterinae
- Genus: Rochonia; DC.

Genus of plants

Rochonia is a genus of Madagascarian plants in the tribe Astereae within the family Asteraceae.

Species

- Rochonia cinerarioides DC.
- Rochonia cuneata DC.

formerly included

see Aster Madagaster

- Rochonia aspera Humbert - Aster andringitrensis Humbert
- Rochonia senecionoides Baker - Madagaster senecionoides (Baker) G.L.Nesom
