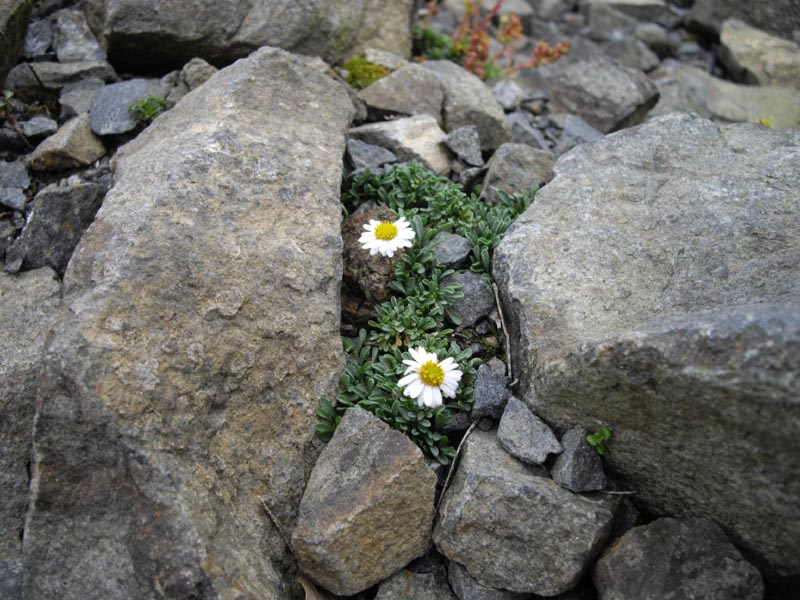

Scientific classification
- Kingdom: Plantae
- Clade: Tracheophytes
- Clade: Angiosperms
- Clade: Eudicots
- Clade: Asterids
- Order: Asterales
- Family: Asteraceae
- Genus: Erigeron
- Species: E. scopulinus

Binomial name
- Erigeron scopulinus G.L.Nesom & Vincent D.Roth

= Erigeron scopulinus =

Species of flowering plant

Erigeron scopulinus is a North American species of flowering plant in the family Asteraceae known by the common names rock fleabane and Winn Falls fleabane. It has been found in the southwestern United States primarily in Arizona and New Mexico with a few isolated populations in Colorado.

Erigeron scopulinus grows in on ledges and in cracks in cliffs in the mountains. It is a perennial, mat-forming herb rarely more than 3.5 cm (1.4 inches) tall, forming a thin taproot and spreading by means of underground rhizomes. The inflorescence generally contains only one flower head. Each head contains 10–20 ray florets surrounding many yellow disc florets.
