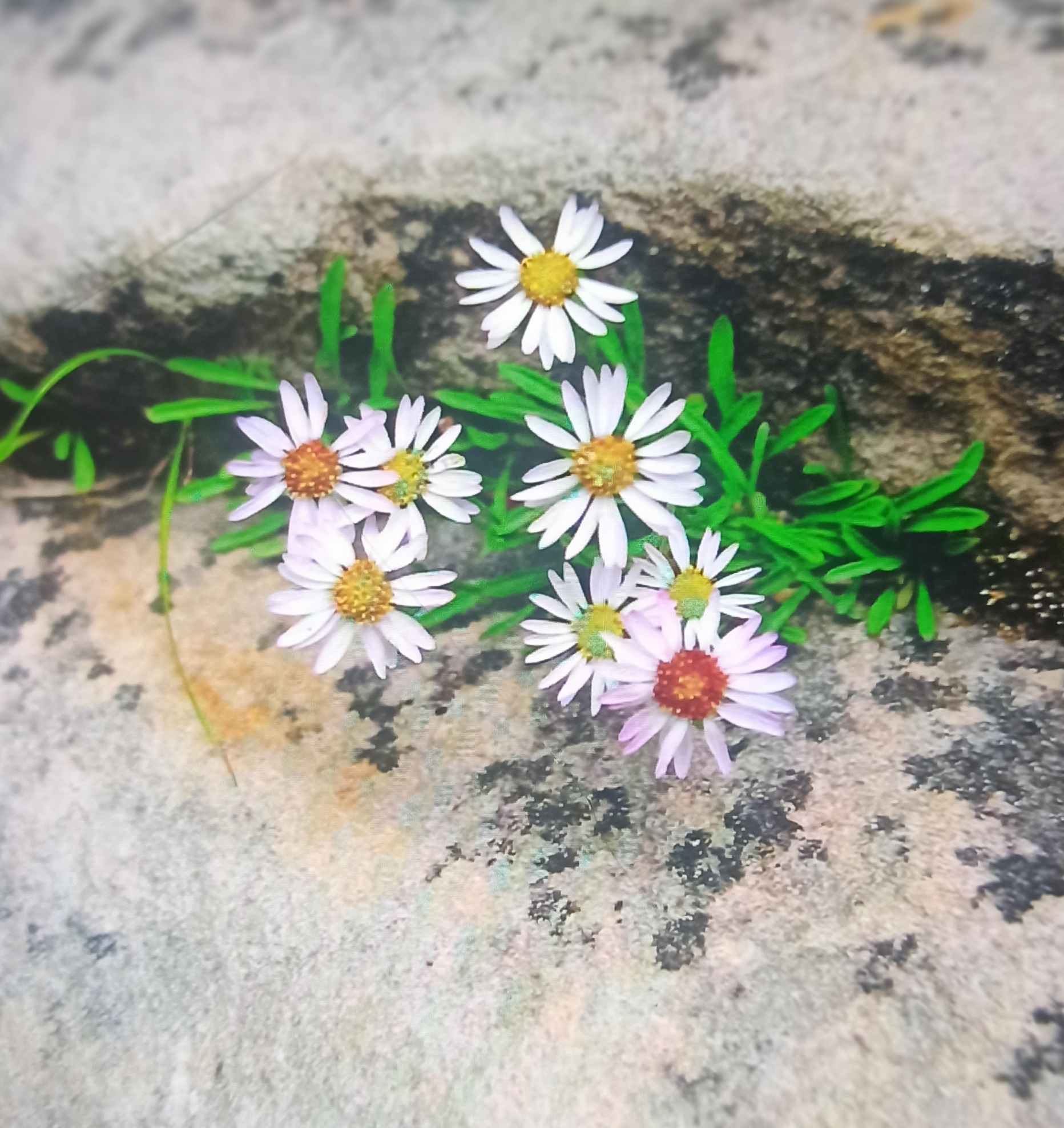

Scientific classification
- Kingdom: Plantae
- Clade: Tracheophytes
- Clade: Angiosperms
- Clade: Eudicots
- Clade: Asterids
- Order: Asterales
- Family: Asteraceae
- Genus: Erigeron
- Species: E. saxatilis

Binomial name
- Erigeron saxatilis G.L.Nesom

= Erigeron saxatilis =

Species of flowering plant

Erigeron saxatilis is a rare North American species of flowering plant in the family Asteraceae known by the common name rock fleabane. It has been found only in northern Arizona, in Yavapai and Coconino Counties north of the Mogollon Rim.

Erigeron saxatilis grows on ledges and cracks in the walls of canyons. It is a very small perennial herb rarely more than 5 cm (2 inches) tall, forming a woody underground caudex. The inflorescence generally contains only 1 flower head per stem. Each head contains 20–29 white ray florets surrounding many yellow disc florets.
