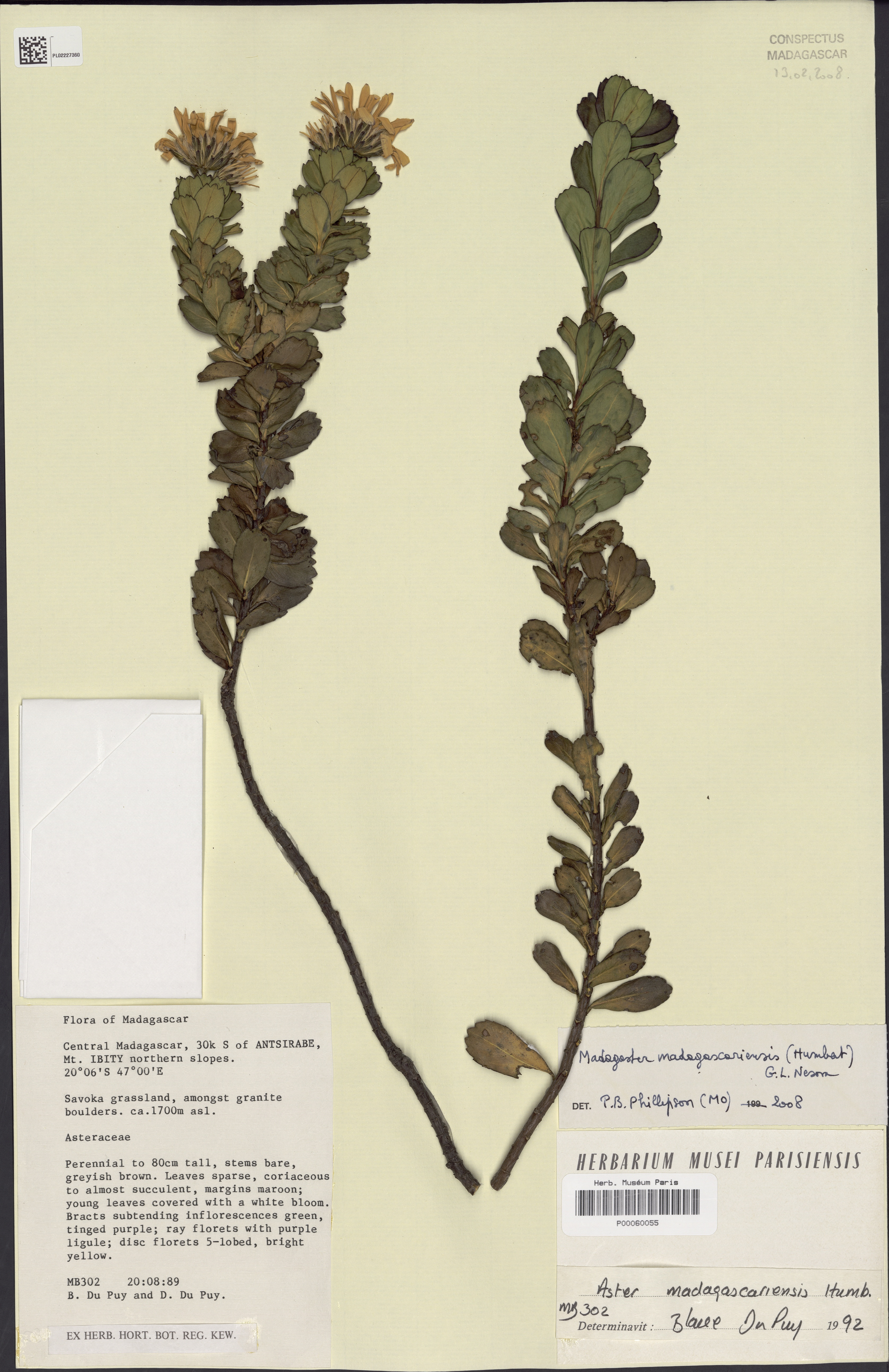
- Madagaster madagascariensis

Scientific classification
- Kingdom: Plantae
- Clade: Tracheophytes
- Clade: Angiosperms
- Clade: Eudicots
- Clade: Asterids
- Order: Asterales
- Family: Asteraceae
- Subfamily: Asteroideae
- Tribe: Astereae
- Subtribe: Madagasterinae
- Genus: Madagaster; G.L.Nesom

Type species
- Madagaster mandrarensis (Humbert) G.L.Nesom

= Madagaster =

Genus of flowering plants

Madagaster is a genus of Madagascan plants in the tribe Astereae within the family Asteraceae.

Species

- Madagaster andohahelensis (Humbert) G.L.Nesom
- Madagaster madagascariensis (Humbert) G.L.Nesom
- Madagaster mandrarensis (Humbert) G.L.Nesom
- Madagaster saboureaui (Humbert) G.L.Nesom
- Madagaster senecionoides (Baker) G.L.Nesom
