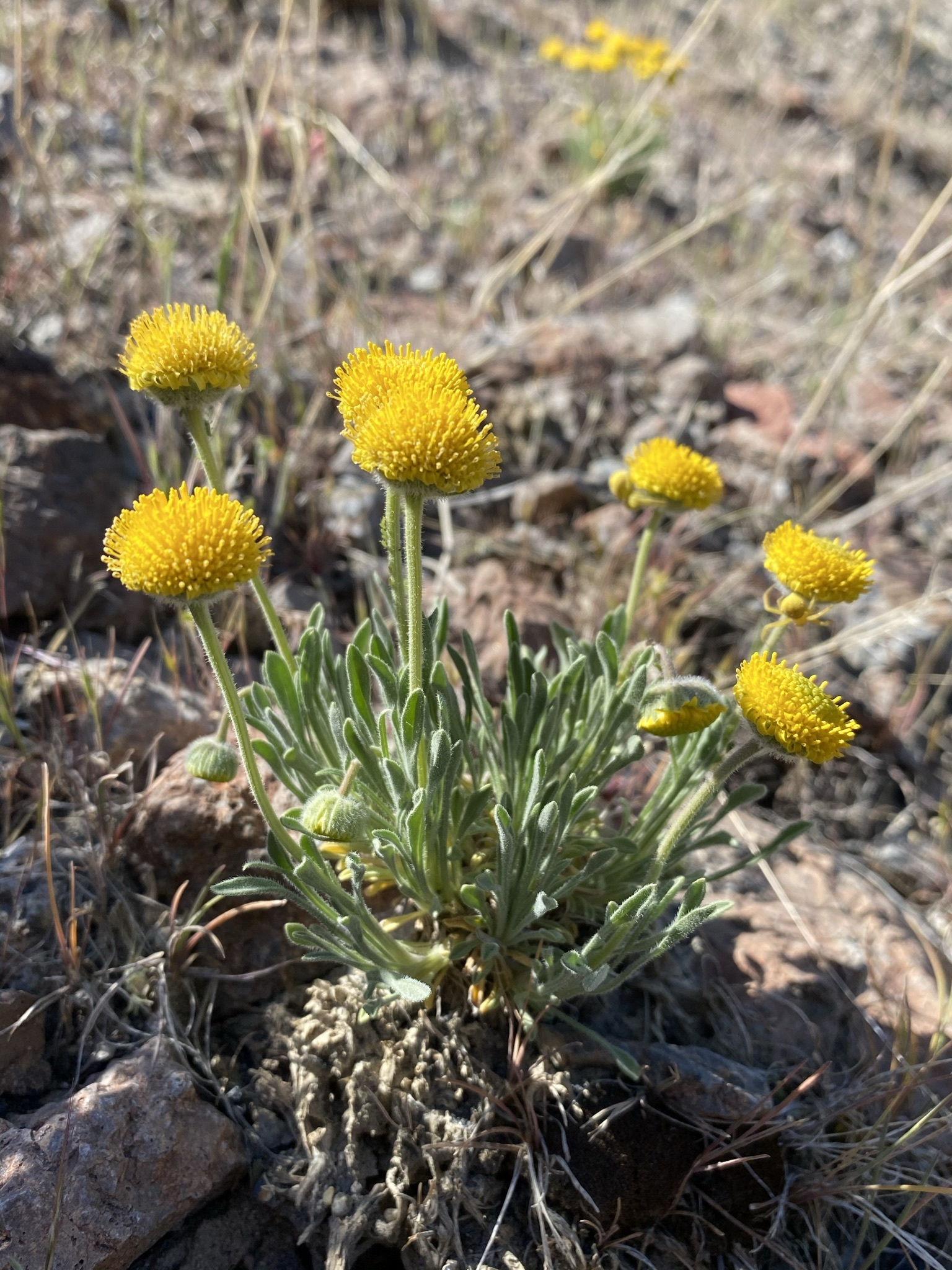

Scientific classification
- Kingdom: Plantae
- Clade: Tracheophytes
- Clade: Angiosperms
- Clade: Eudicots
- Clade: Asterids
- Order: Asterales
- Family: Asteraceae
- Genus: Erigeron
- Species: E. chrysopsidis
- Variety: E. c. var. austiniae

Trinomial name
- Erigeron chrysopsidis var. austiniae (Greene) G.L.Nesom

Synonyms
- Erigeron austiniae Greene; Erigeron austinae Greene; Erigeron chrysopsidis subsp. austiniae (Greene) Cronquist

= Erigeron chrysopsidis var. austiniae =

Species of flowering plant

Erigeron chrysopsidis var. austiniae is a species of flowering plant in the family Asteraceae known by the common name sagebrush fleabane. It is sometimes considered a full species, Erigeron austiniae. It is native to the western United States from northeastern California to southwestern Idaho, where it grows in the sagebrush and juniper woodlands. It is a small, clumping perennial herb producing a hairy stem up to about 12 centimeters tall from a woody caudex and taproot surrounded by narrow linear to somewhat oval leaves up to 8 centimeters long. The inflorescence is a solitary flat-topped woolly flower head containing many yellow disc florets. There occasionally appears a yellow ray floret, but they are usually absent. The fruit is an achene with a pappus of bristles.
