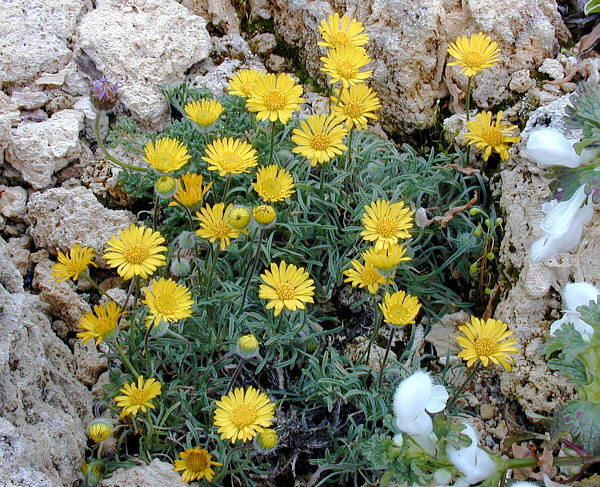

Scientific classification
- Kingdom: Plantae
- Clade: Tracheophytes
- Clade: Angiosperms
- Clade: Eudicots
- Clade: Asterids
- Order: Asterales
- Family: Asteraceae
- Genus: Erigeron
- Species: E. chrysopsidis

Binomial name
- Erigeron chrysopsidis A.Gray

Synonyms
- Chrysopsis hirtella DC. not Erigeron hirtellusDC.; Erigeron chrysopsidis var. brevifolius Piper; Erigeron curvifolius Piper; Erigeron filifolius var. curvifolius (Piper) A.Nelson

= Erigeron chrysopsidis =

Species of flowering plant

Erigeron chrysopsidis is a North American species of flowering plants in the family Asteraceae known by the common name dwarf yellow fleabane. It is found in the western United States: southeastern Washington, Oregon, extreme northern California, northern Nevada, Idaho.

Erigeron chrysopsidis is a very small perennial herb up to 15 cm (8 inches) tall, forming a taproot. Most of the leaves are low and close to the ground. Each stem produces only one flower head, with 20-60 yellow ray florets plus numerous yellow disc florets.

Varieties

- Erigeron chrysopsidis var. austiniae (Greene) G.L.Nesom - California, Idaho, Nevada, Oregon
- Erigeron chrysopsidis var. brevifolius Piper - Oregon
- Erigeron chrysopsidis var. chrysopsidis - Oregon, Washington
