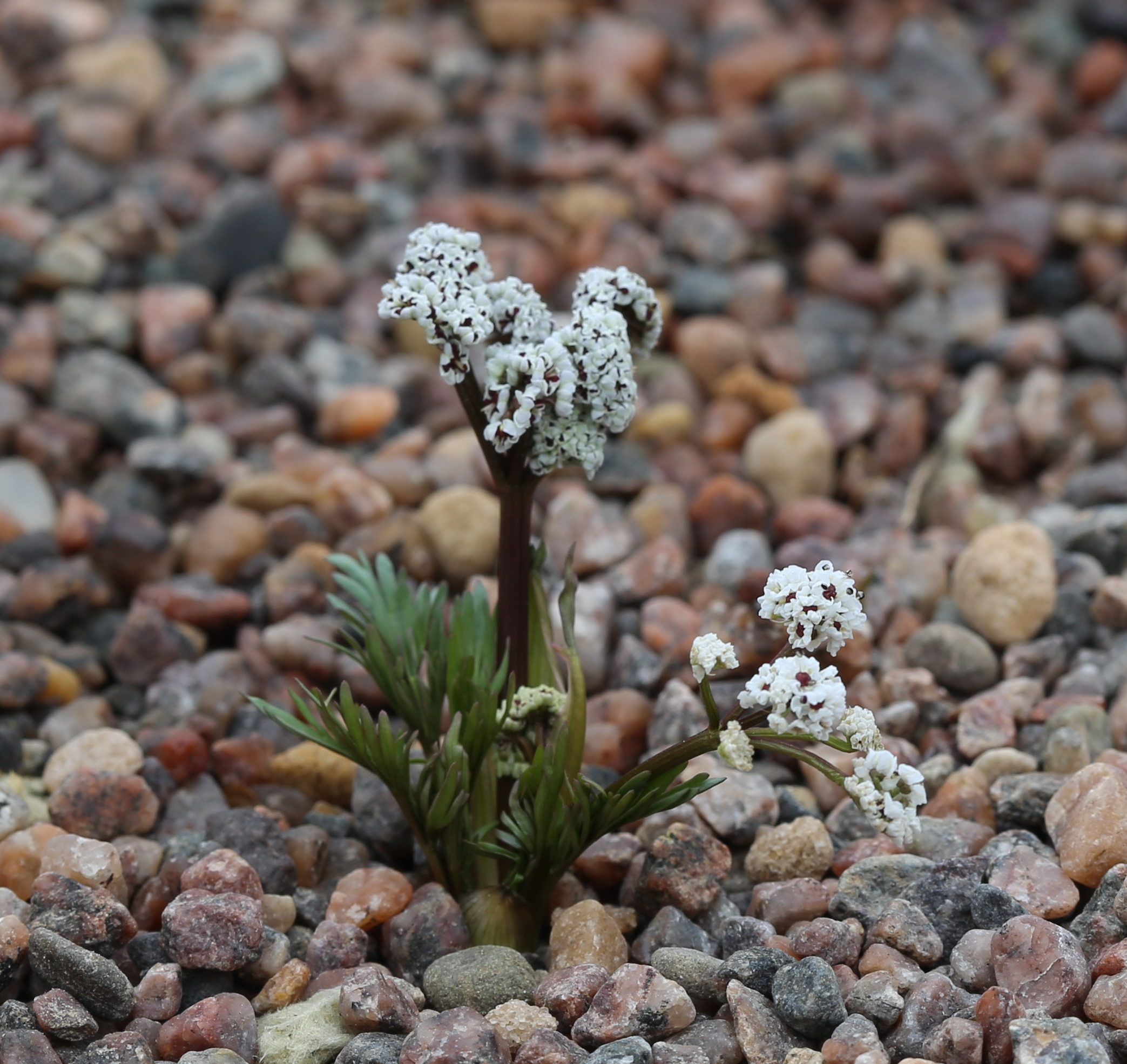

Scientific classification
- Kingdom: Plantae
- Clade: Tracheophytes
- Clade: Angiosperms
- Clade: Eudicots
- Clade: Asterids
- Order: Apiales
- Family: Apiaceae
- Genus: Lomatium
- Species: L. gormanii

Binomial name
- Lomatium gormanii (Howell) J.M.Coult. & Rose

= Lomatium gormanii =

Species of flowering plant

Lomatium gormanii, with the common names Gorman's biscuitroot and salt & pepper, is a perennial herb of the family Apiaceae. It is endemic to the Northwestern United States, in Idaho, Oregon, and Washington, being found in steppes and montane environments. It is called sasamít̓a, sasamít̓aya, and łałamít̓a in the Sahaptin language.

The species is only a few inches tall and flowers before many in the sagebrush steppe, sometimes when the ground is still covered in snow. Its condimental common name refers to the darkness of the dark violet anthers and the white petals. The leaves are divided and narrow.

Lomatium gormanii is easily confused with Lomatium piperi (Sahaptin mámɨn), but L. gormanii lacks stem leaves and the roots are generally larger and 'hairier' (i.e., many more rootlets) than L. piperi. L. gormanii is also more common and grows in places where L. piperi does not.

== Gallery ==
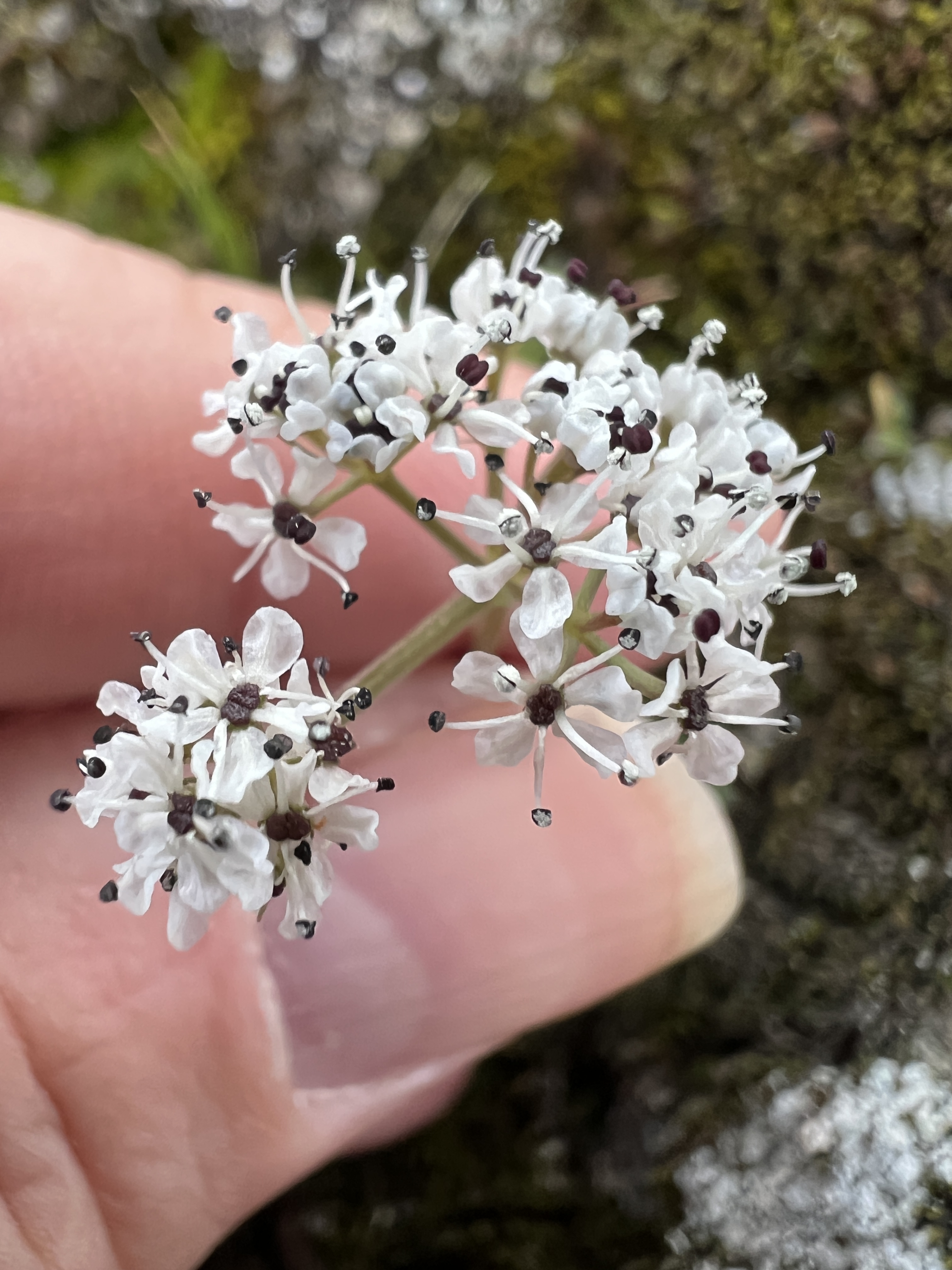
Flower

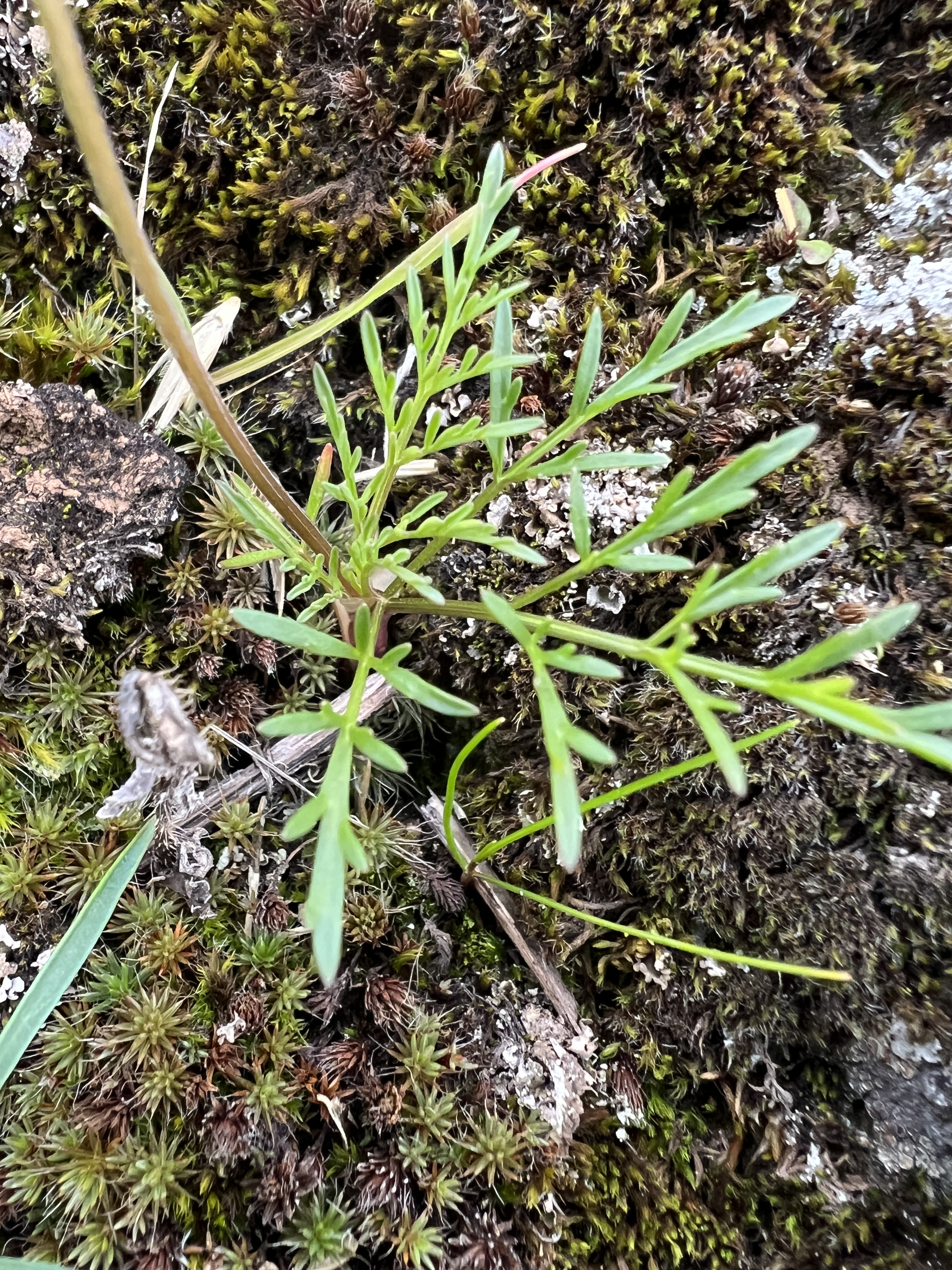
Leaf
