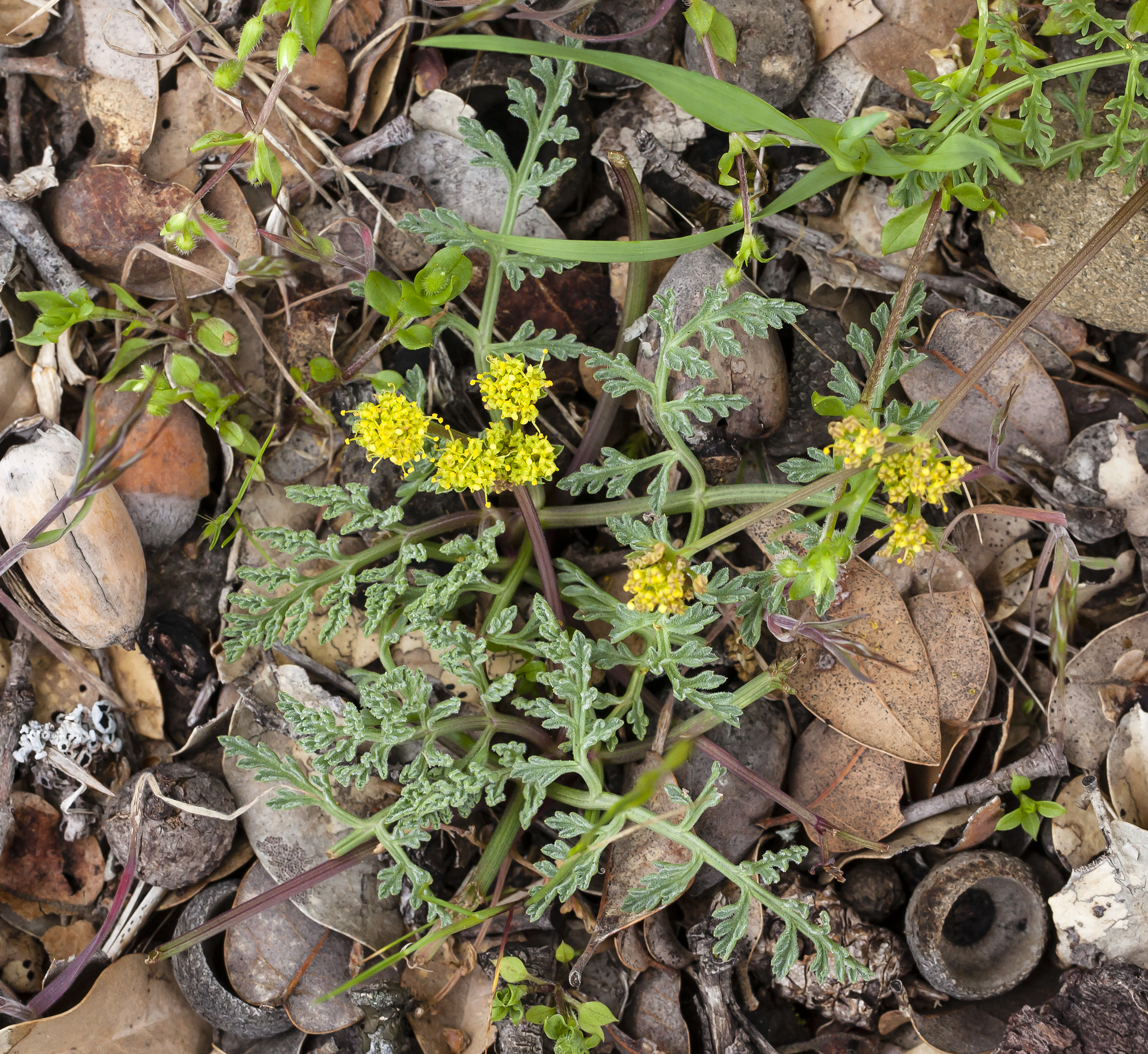

Conservation status
- Critically Imperiled (NatureServe)

Scientific classification
- Kingdom: Plantae
- Clade: Tracheophytes
- Clade: Angiosperms
- Clade: Eudicots
- Clade: Asterids
- Order: Apiales
- Family: Apiaceae
- Genus: Lomatium
- Species: L. observatorium

Binomial name
- Lomatium observatorium Constance & Ertter

= Lomatium observatorium =

Species of flowering plant

Lomatium observatorium, commonly known as Mt. Hamilton desertparsley and Mount Hamilton lomatium, is a rare species of flowering plant in the carrot family (Apiaceae). The species was first described in 1996 by botanists Lincoln Constance and Barbara Ertter in Madrono. It is endemic to California, where it is known only from the mountains of Santa Clara County, including Mount Hamilton near the Lick Observatory, with possible occurrences in adjacent Stanislaus County. Its habitat includes mountain woodlands on volcanic and metamorphosed sedimentary rock substrates at elevations between 1,280 and 1,330 meters. It is considered rare and threatened because of its narrow distribution and small population size. Currently, it holds a California Native Plant Society Rare Plant Inventory rank of 1B.2. The plant typically blooms from March to May and fruits from May to June. They are commonly used in Butterfly Gardens.

== Description ==
The plant is a grayish perennial herb, and they are lightly hairy herbage growing from a long taproot of 15 cm. The leaves are at slightly different heights, with the leaflets being oblong or very narrowly elliptic. The leaf blades are up to 12 centimeters long and are divided into many subdivided lobes. The smallest segments linear or lance-shaped and pointed, and the blades are borne on petioles a few centimeters in length. The inflorescence is an umbel of one or more clusters of tiny flowers borne on a peduncle, which is very short or elongated, up to 20 centimeters tall. For peduncles, there can be at most 6 per plant and 1 per stem. The petals tend to be a vibrant yellow color, and the mericarps tend to be ashy white adaxially.

== Conservation methods ==
Conservation of Lomatium observatorium focuses on protecting its very limited habitat and minimizing direct human and ecological threats. As stated earlier, according to the California Native Plant Society Rare Plant Inventory, the species is ranked 1B.2. This ranking is for plants that are rare, threatened, or endangered in California. The species was also ranked globally G1 because the plant is considered critically imperiled.

According to the Center for Plant Conservation (CPC), there are many partners assigned to conserve the Lomatium observatorium. Among those partner are the California Native Plant Society, National Laboratory for Genetic Resource Preservation (USDA-ARS), California Botanic Garden, and University of California-Santa Cruz Arboretum & Botanic Garden.
