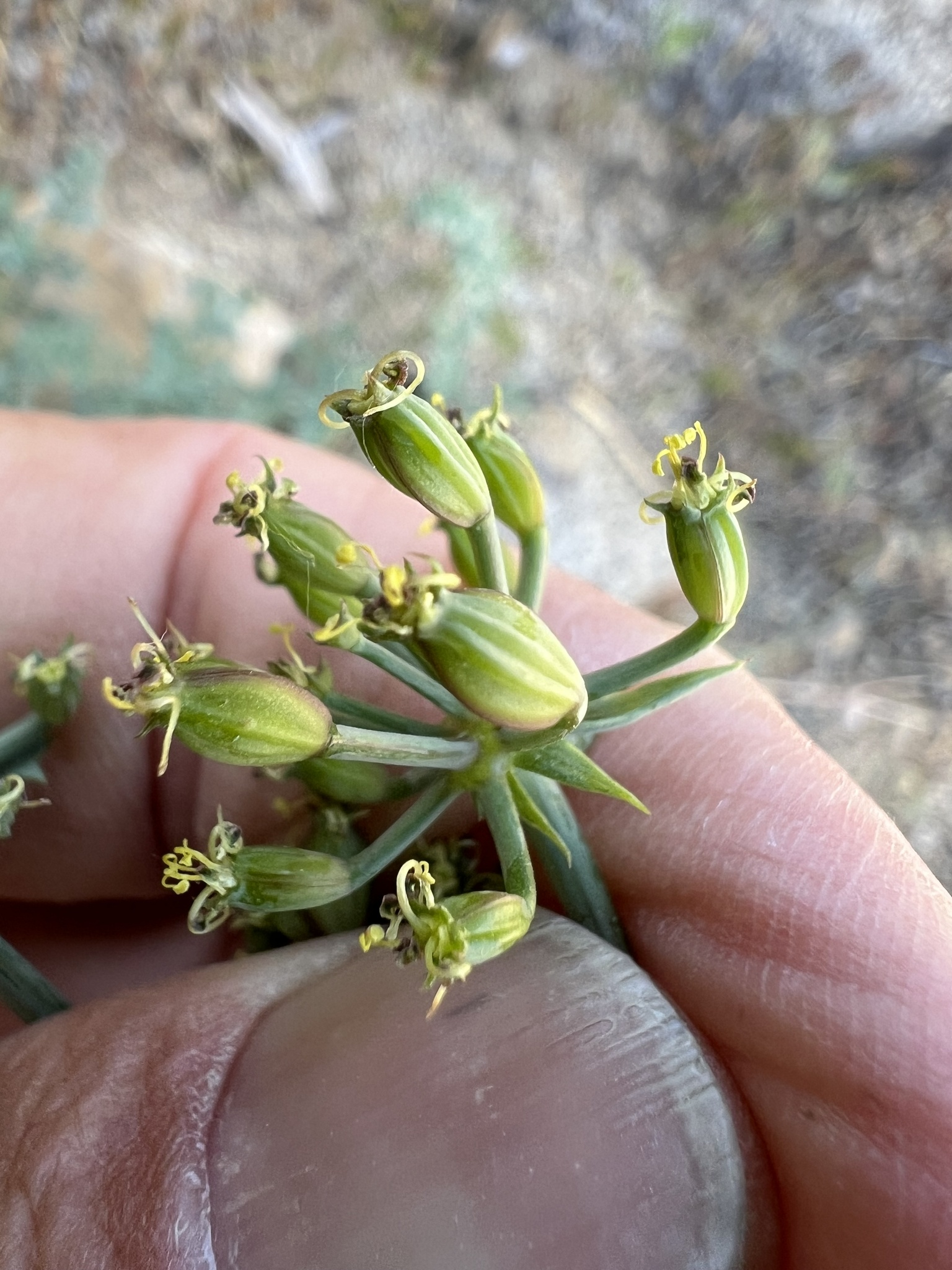

Scientific classification
- Kingdom: Plantae
- Clade: Tracheophytes
- Clade: Angiosperms
- Clade: Eudicots
- Clade: Asterids
- Order: Apiales
- Family: Apiaceae
- Genus: Lomatium
- Species: L. rigidum

Binomial name
- Lomatium rigidum (M.E.Jones) Jeps.

= Lomatium rigidum =

Species of flowering plant

Lomatium rigidum is a species of flowering plant in the carrot family known by the common names Big Pine biscuitroot and stiff lomatium. It is endemic to Inyo County, California, where it is known only from the wilderness around the Big Pine area of the Owens Valley.

== Description ==
Lomatium rigidum is a perennial herb growing up to about half a meter-1.5 feet tall from a large taproot. There is generally no stem, the leaves and inflorescence emerging at ground level. The hairless gray-green leaf blades are made up of several sharp-toothed, fleshy segments. The inflorescence is a webbed umbel of tiny yellow flowers.
