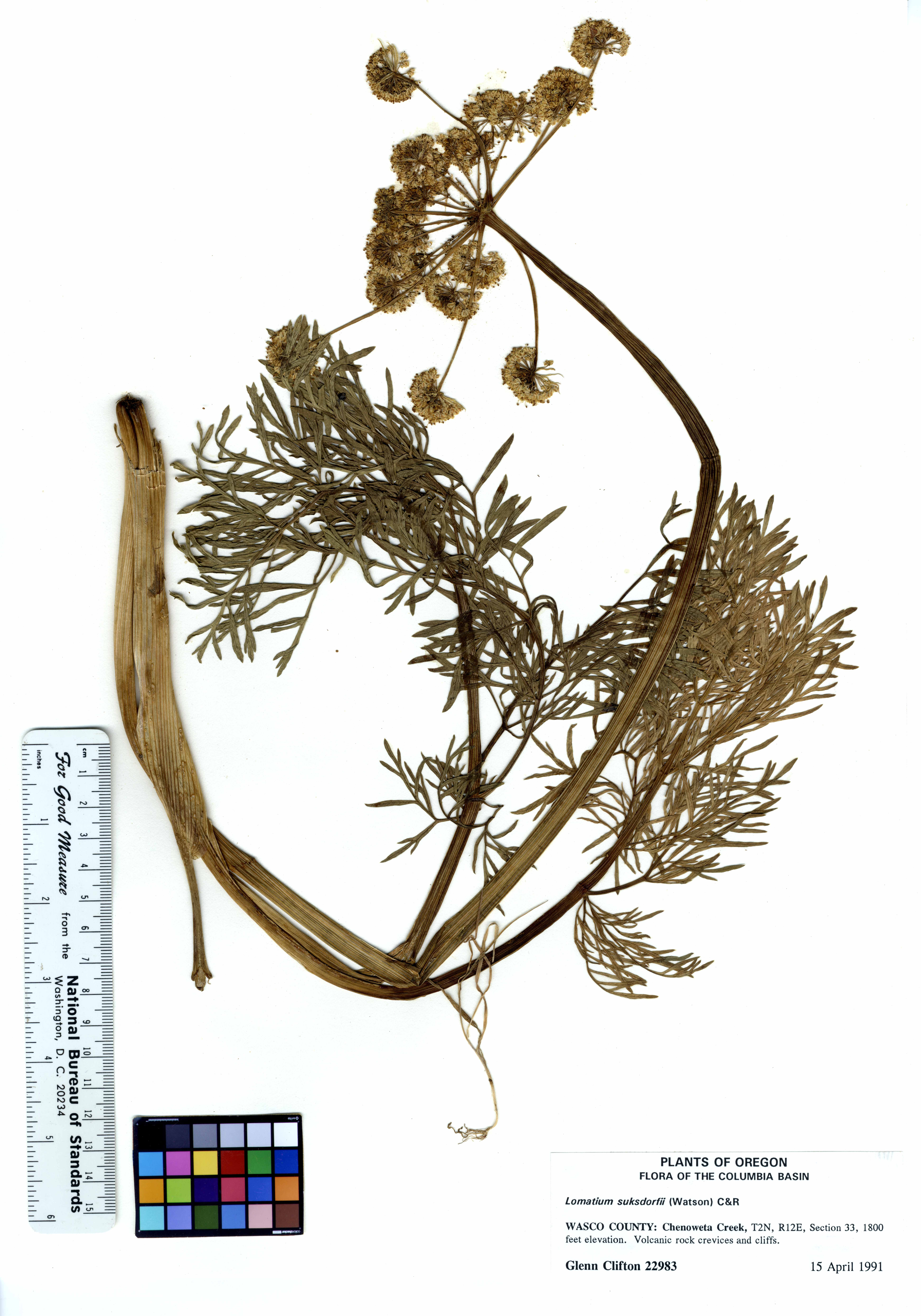

Scientific classification
- Kingdom: Plantae
- Clade: Tracheophytes
- Clade: Angiosperms
- Clade: Eudicots
- Clade: Asterids
- Order: Apiales
- Family: Apiaceae
- Genus: Lomatium
- Species: L. suksdorfii

Binomial name
- Lomatium suksdorfii (S.Watson) J.M.Coult. & Rose

= Lomatium suksdorfii =

Species of flowering plant

Lomatium suksdorfii (Suksdorf's desertparsley) is a perennial herb of the family Apiaceae that grows in Washington and Oregon, United States.

It is 50–200 cm tall, glabrous, caulescent, and has a taproot. It flowers from late March to May, with compound umbels of yellow flowers, each umbellule enclosed by thin bracts. The leaves have long petioles and are dissected into long, thin blades.
