= Lomatium repostum =

Scientific classification
- Kingdom: Plantae
- Clade: Tracheophytes
- Clade: Angiosperms
- Clade: Eudicots
- Clade: Asterids
- Order: Apiales
- Family: Apiaceae
- Genus: Lomatium
- Species: L. repostum

Binomial name
- Lomatium repostum (Jeps.) Mathias

Species of flowering plant

Lomatium repostum is an uncommon species of flowering plant in the carrot family known by the common name Napa biscuitroot, or Napa lomatium. It is endemic to California, where it is known only from the northrthern California Coast Ranges surrounding the northern San Francisco Bay Area. It often grows in plant communities on serpentine soils.

== Description ==
Lomatium repostum is a spreading perennial herb growing up to half a meter long from a slender taproot. There is generally no stem, the leaves and inflorescence emerging at ground level. The leaf blades are made up of sharp-toothed oval leaflets each up to 6 centimeters long. The inflorescence is an umbel of yellowish-green to purplish flowers.
