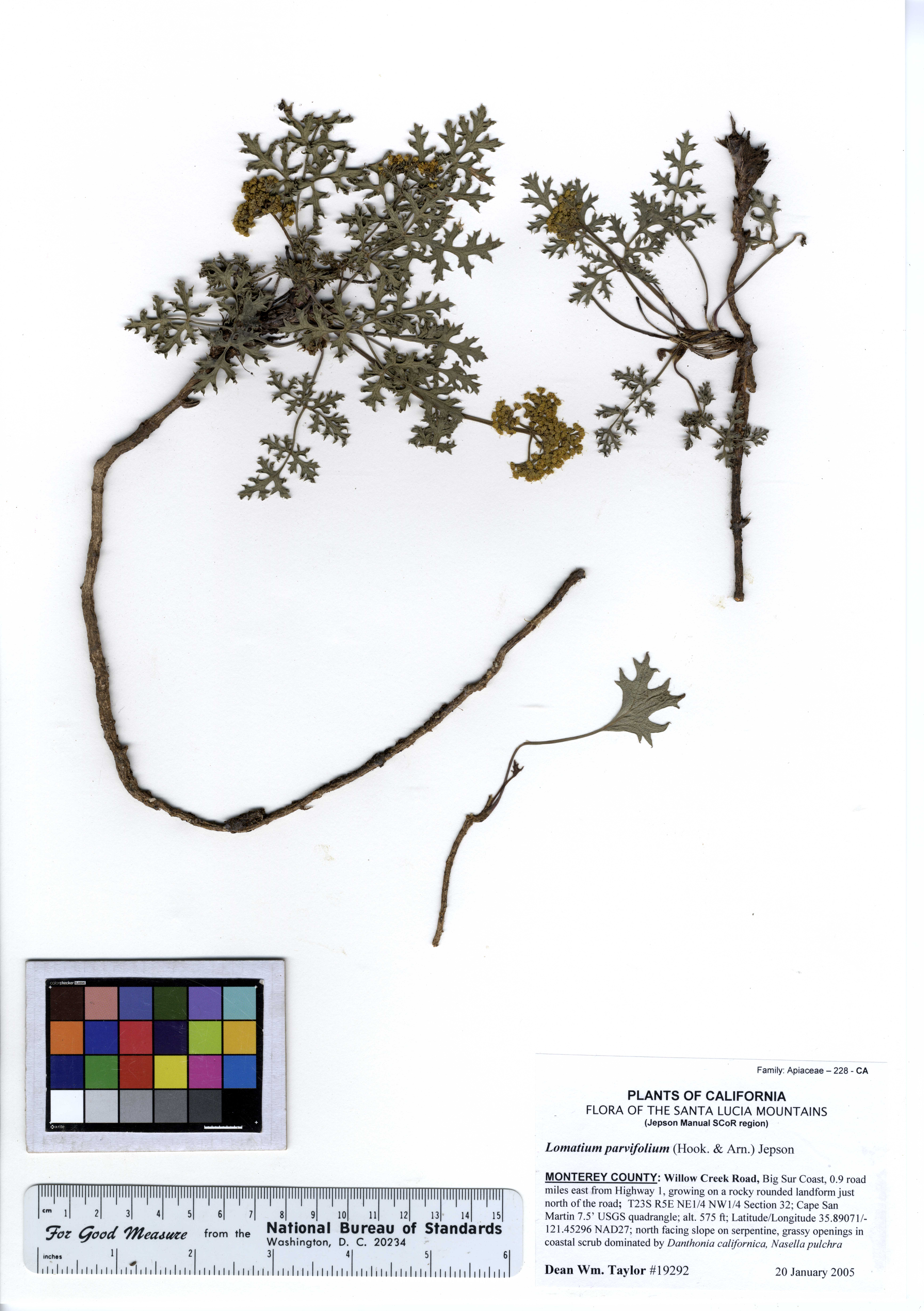

Scientific classification
- Kingdom: Plantae
- Clade: Tracheophytes
- Clade: Angiosperms
- Clade: Eudicots
- Clade: Asterids
- Order: Apiales
- Family: Apiaceae
- Genus: Lomatium
- Species: L. parvifolium

Binomial name
- Lomatium parvifolium (Hook. & Arn.) Jeps.

= Lomatium parvifolium =

Species of flowering plant

Lomatium parvifolium is an uncommon species of flowering plant in the carrot family known by the common names coastal biscuitroot and small-leaved lomatium. It is endemic to California, where it is known only from the Central Coast and central California Coast Ranges. It grows in pine forests and other habitat on serpentine soils.

== Description ==
Lomatium parvifolium is a fleshy perennial herb growing up to about 40 centimeters long from a small taproot. The leaf blades are divided into segments which are subdivided into narrow, flat lobes. The inflorescence is an umbel of yellow flowers.
