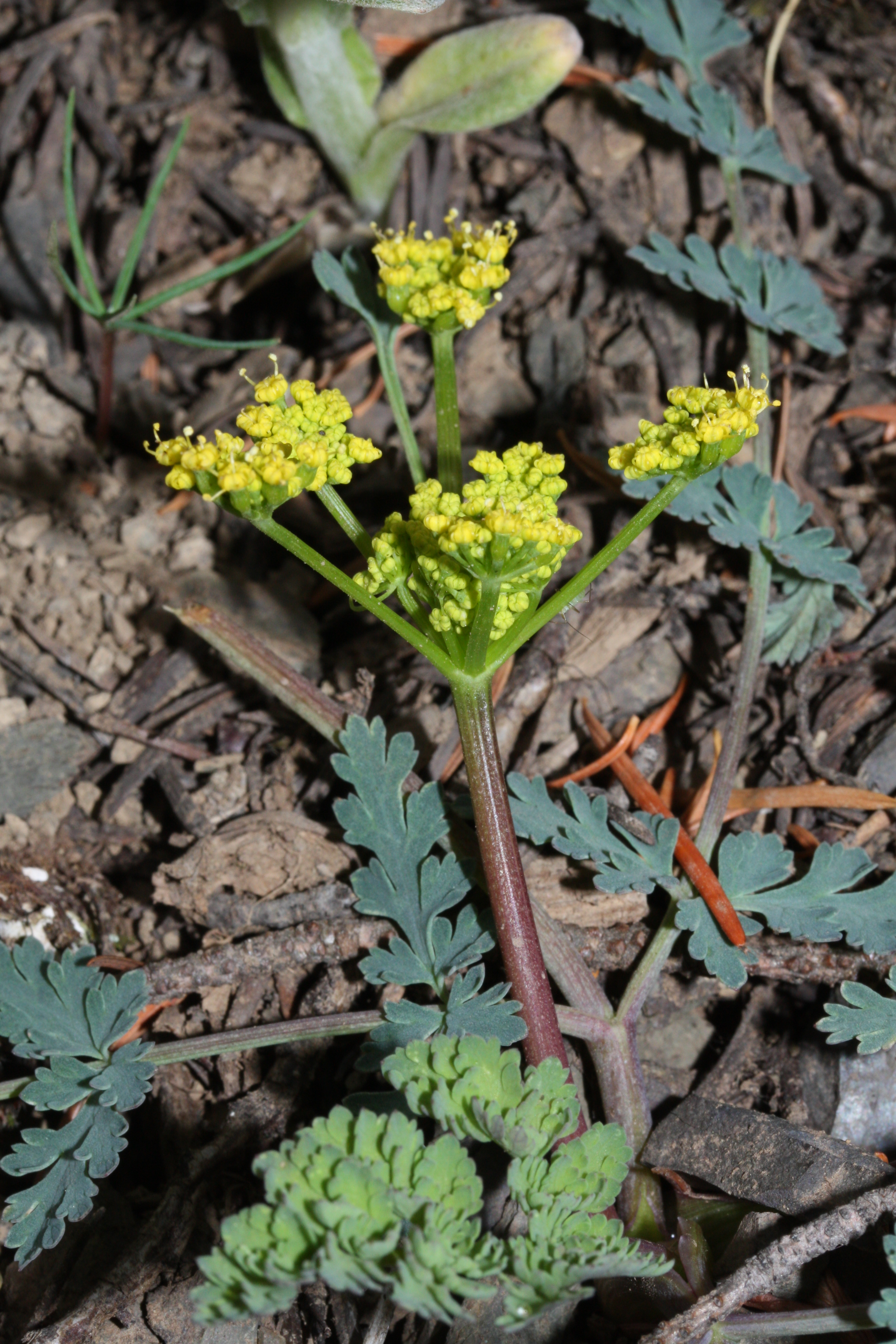

Scientific classification
- Kingdom: Plantae
- Clade: Tracheophytes
- Clade: Angiosperms
- Clade: Eudicots
- Clade: Asterids
- Order: Apiales
- Family: Apiaceae
- Genus: Lomatium
- Species: L. martindalei

Binomial name
- Lomatium martindalei J.M.Coult. & Rose

= Lomatium martindalei =

Species of flowering plant

Lomatium martindalei is a species of flowering plant in the carrot family known by the common names Cascade desertparsley and coast range lomatium, native to western North America.

== Range ==
Lomatium martindalei is native to the west coast of North America, from Vancouver Island south to the Klamath Mountains of far northern California. It can be found in a number of open coastal and inland habitats, from coastal plains to high mountain talus and meadows.

== Description ==
Lomatium martindalei is a perennial herb with a flower stalk 15 to 40 centimeters tall from a carrot-like taproot. There is often no stem, with the spreading or semi-erect leaves and inflorescence emerging from ground level. The thinly fleshy leaves may approach 20 centimeters long, their blades divided into leaflets made up of many small oval segments. The inflorescence bears an umbel of small yellowish flowers.
