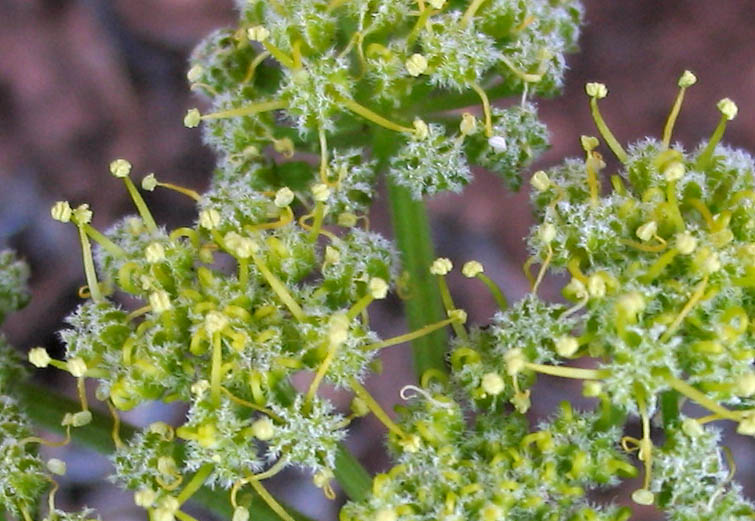

Scientific classification
- Kingdom: Plantae
- Clade: Tracheophytes
- Clade: Angiosperms
- Clade: Eudicots
- Clade: Asterids
- Order: Apiales
- Family: Apiaceae
- Genus: Lomatium
- Species: L. dasycarpum

Binomial name
- Lomatium dasycarpum (Torr. & A.Gray) J.M.Coult. & Rose

= Lomatium dasycarpum =

Species of flowering plant

Lomatium dasycarpum is a species of flowering plant in the carrot family known by the common name woollyfruit desertparsley. It is native to California and Baja California, where it is widespread throughout many of the mountain ranges, including the Peninsular, Sierra Nevada, and California Coast Ranges, and in valleys.

== Description ==
Lomatium dasycarpum is a lightly hairy perennial herb up to about half a meter tall. The upright leaves emerge from the base of the plant, growing up to 24 centimeters long with blades divided into many small, narrow segments. The inflorescence is an umbel of hairy greenish or purplish flowers which yield woolly, flattened, disclike fruits up to 2 centimeters long.
