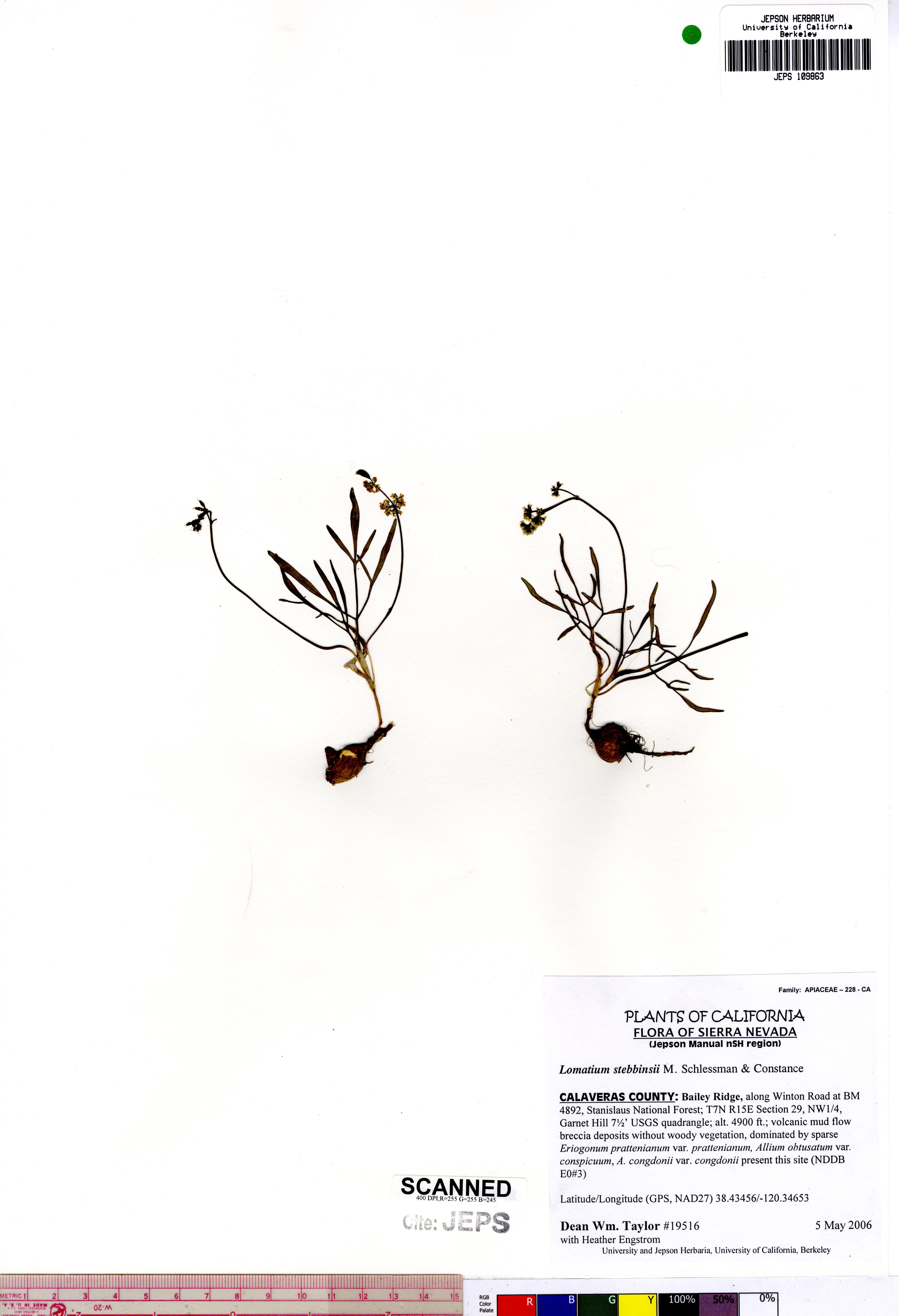

Conservation status
- Imperiled (NatureServe)

Scientific classification
- Kingdom: Plantae
- Clade: Tracheophytes
- Clade: Angiosperms
- Clade: Eudicots
- Clade: Asterids
- Order: Apiales
- Family: Apiaceae
- Genus: Lomatium
- Species: L. stebbinsii

Binomial name
- Lomatium stebbinsii Schlessmann & Constance

= Lomatium stebbinsii =

Species of flowering plant

Lomatium stebbinsii, known by the common name Stebbins' desertparsley, is a rare species of flowering plant in the carrot family.

== Distribution ==
The plant is endemic to the central−western Sierra Nevada in California. It is known only from the slopes near the border of Calaveras and Tuolumne Counties, within the Stanislaus National Forest.

It is a plant of chaparral and lower montane coniferous forest habitats.

== Description ==
Lomatium stebbinsii is a perennial herb growing no more than about 15 centimetres (5.9 in) tall from a rounded tuber. There is generally no stem, the leaves and inflorescence emerging at ground level. The sparse leaves are shiny green and hairless. Each has leaf blades divided into linear leaflets.

The inflorescence is a small umbel of yellow flowers.

Conservation

The California Native Plant Society lists the plant as a critically endangered species.
