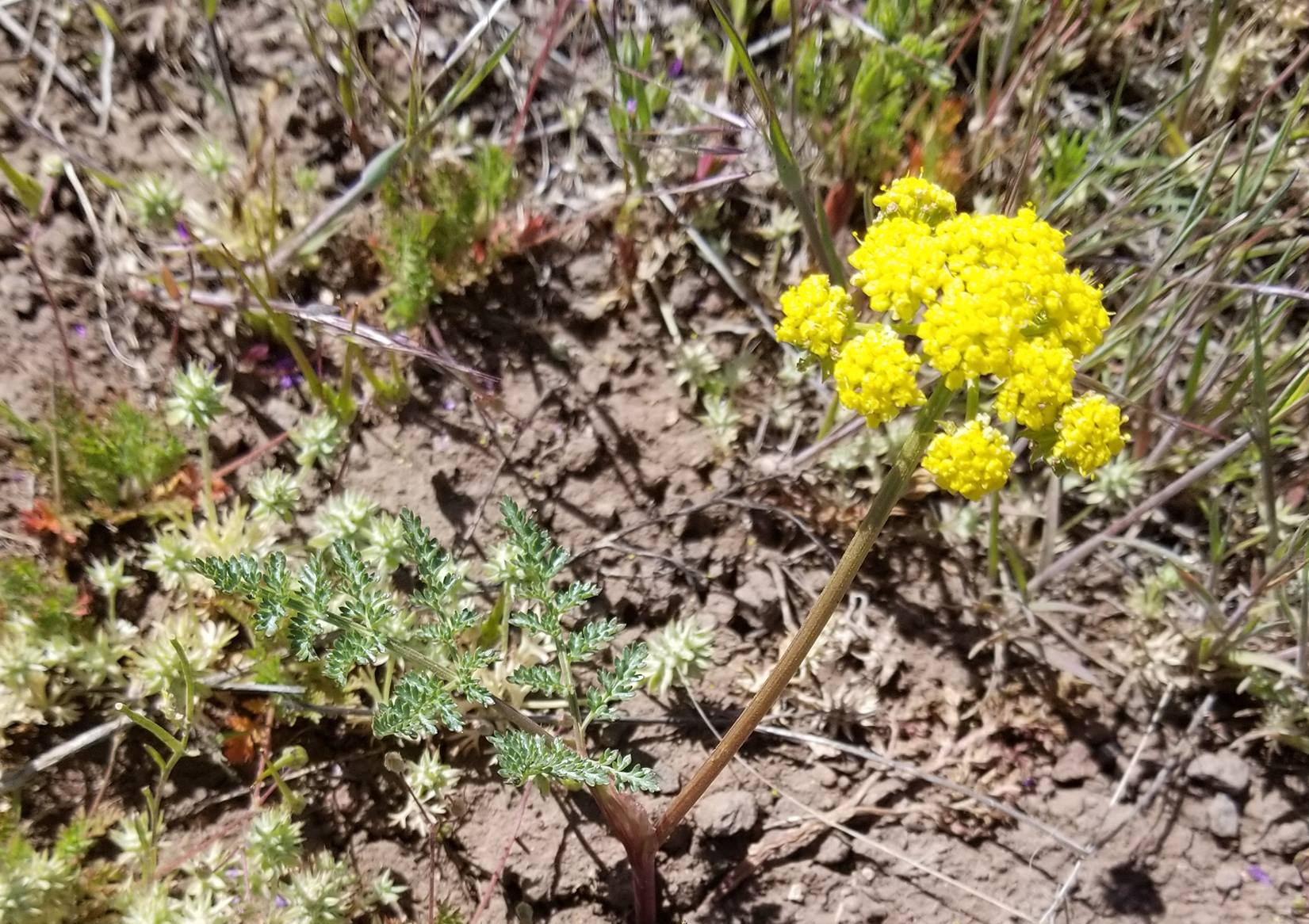

Scientific classification
- Kingdom: Plantae
- Clade: Tracheophytes
- Clade: Angiosperms
- Clade: Eudicots
- Clade: Asterids
- Order: Apiales
- Family: Apiaceae
- Genus: Lomatium
- Species: L. vaginatum

Binomial name
- Lomatium vaginatum (M.E.Jones) J.M.Coult. & Rose

= Lomatium vaginatum =

Broadsheath desertparsley

Species of flowering plant

Lomatium vaginatum is a species of flowering plant in the carrot family known by the common name broadsheath desertparsley. It is native to northern California and adjacent sections of Oregon and Nevada on the Modoc Plateau. It grows in sagebrush, woodland, and other local habitat. This is a perennial herb growing up to 45 centimeters long from a thick taproot. The leaf blades are divided and subdivided into narrow segments. Leaves higher on the stem are enclosed in sheaths. The inflorescence is an umbel of yellow flowers.
