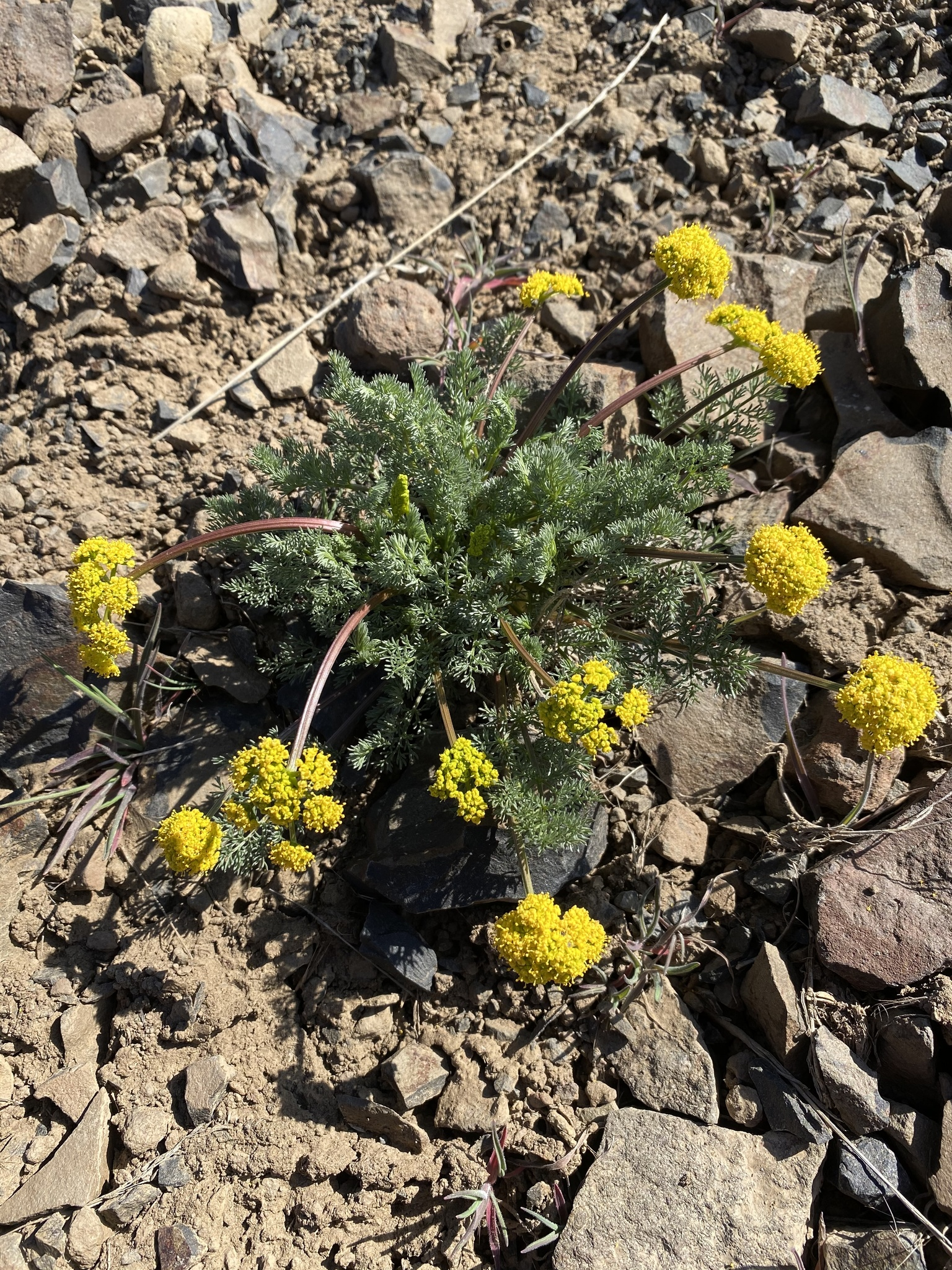
- In flower

Scientific classification
- Kingdom: Plantae
- Clade: Tracheophytes
- Clade: Angiosperms
- Clade: Eudicots
- Clade: Asterids
- Order: Apiales
- Family: Apiaceae
- Genus: Lomatium
- Species: L. quintuplex

Binomial name
- Lomatium quintuplex Schlessman & Constance

= Lomatium quintuplex =

Species of plant

Lomatium quintuplex is a perennial herb in the carrot family Apiaceae, native to the U.S. state of Washington, and known by the common name Umtanum desertparsley. It grows in thin rocky soil on open slopes and is known only from a small region in Kittitas and Yakima counties.

== Description ==
Plants are small, usually less than 30 cm (12 inches) tall. The compound leaves are held on short thick stalks and are highly dissected into nearly cylindrical linear leaflets that terminate in a point. Leaflets are 1–3 cm long and about 1 mm in diameter. Flowers appear early in the growth season (March or April) and are held above or to the side of the foliage in a compound umbel on thick, fleshy stalks that arise from the base of the plant. The flowers are yellow.

== Range and habitat ==
Lomatium quintuplex has a narrow range in central Washington scablands, but it can be locally very common. It generally grows in shallow rocky soil above basalt bedrock, where water comes mostly from snow melt and early spring rains, and the soils are often dry to bedrock by early summer.

== Gallery ==
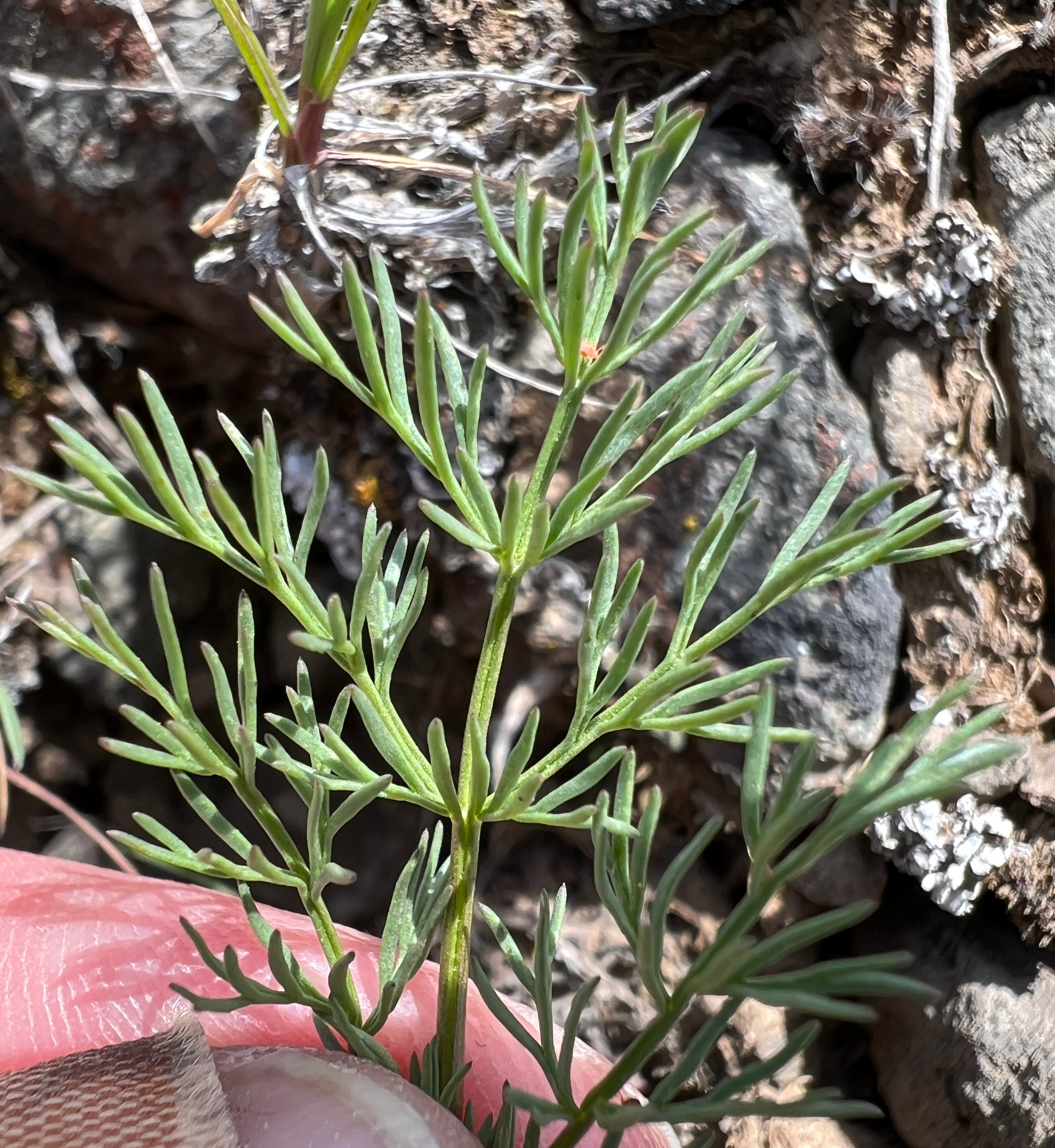
Part of one leaf

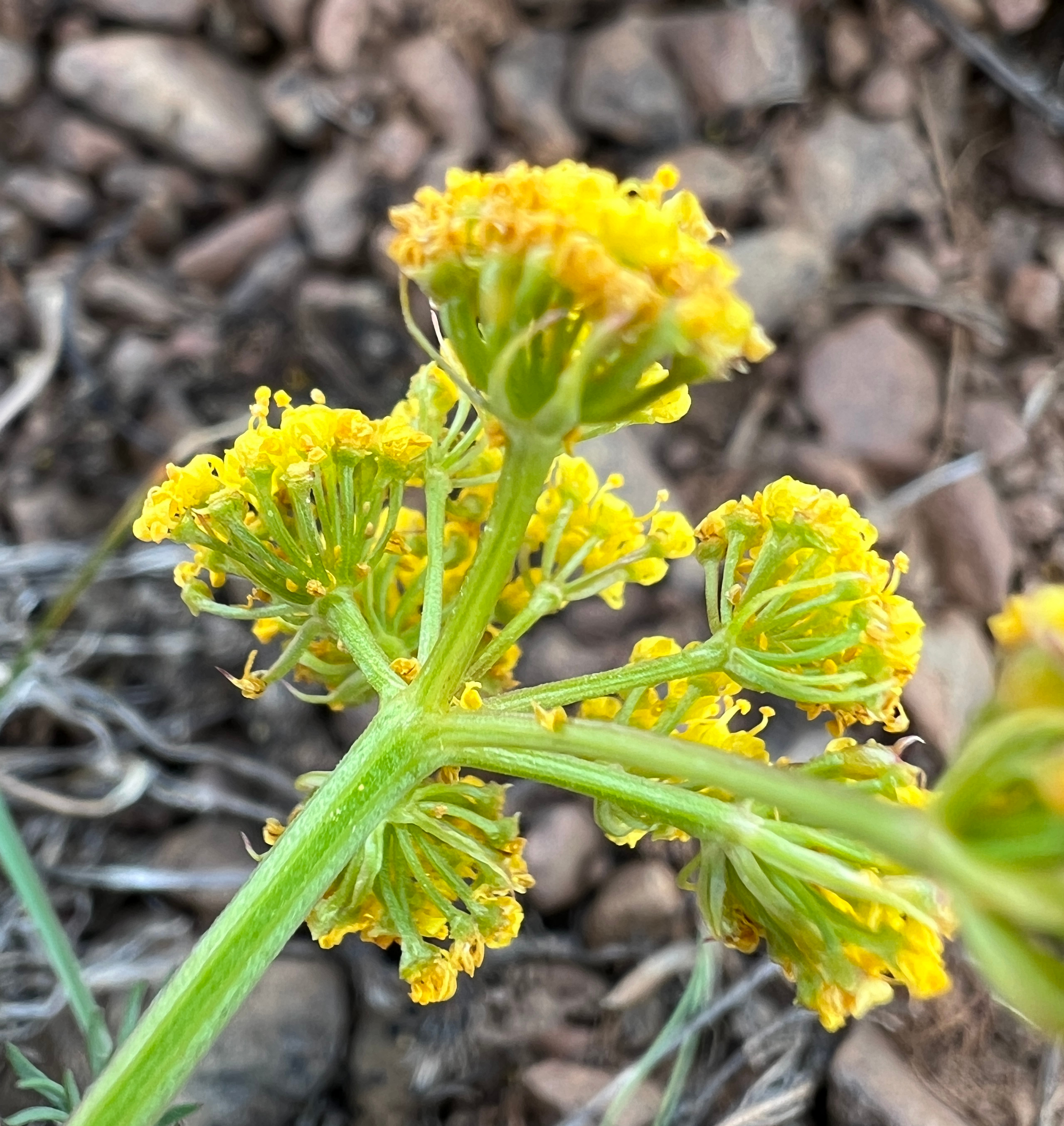
Compound flower umbel
