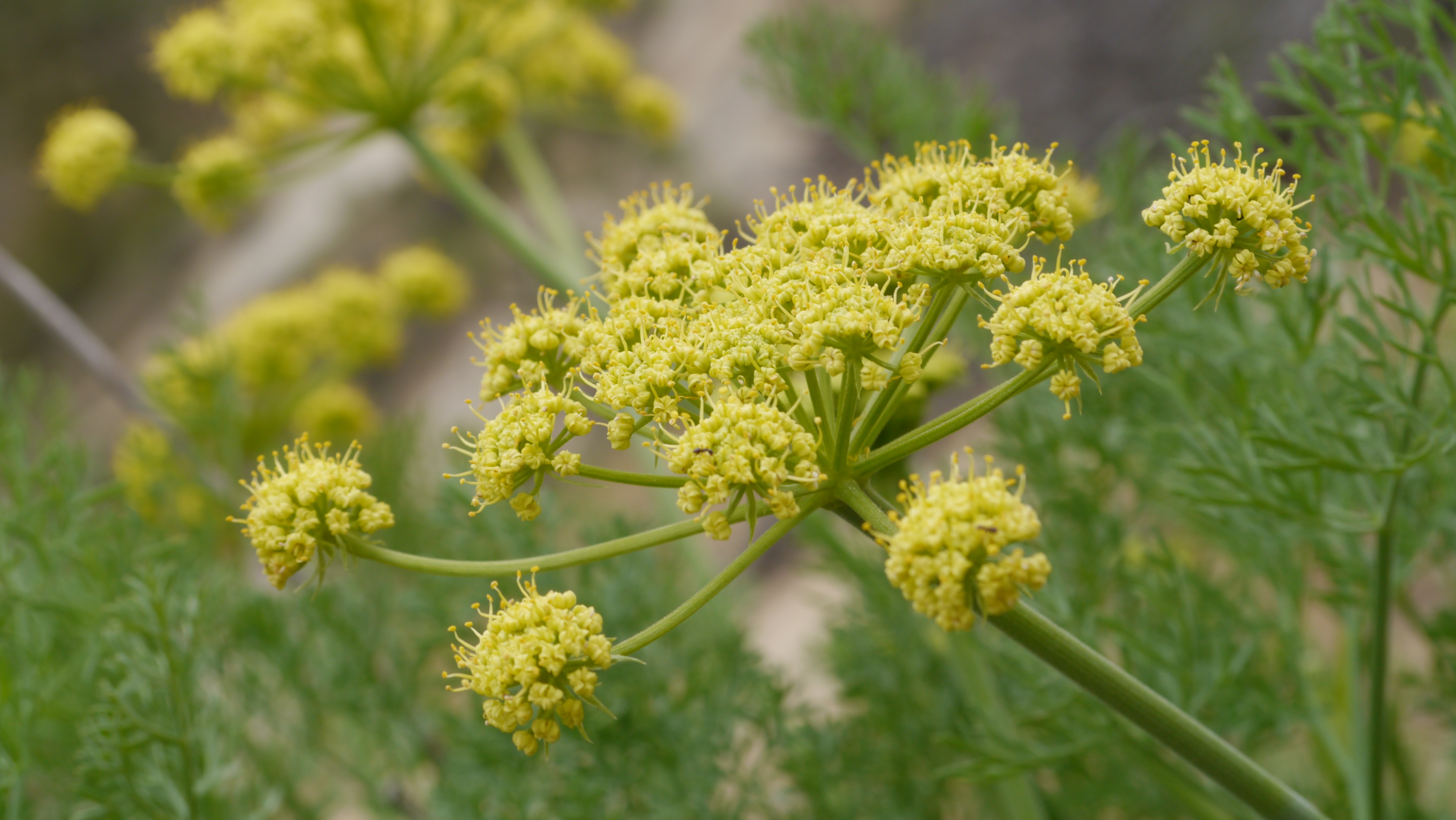

Scientific classification
- Kingdom: Plantae
- Clade: Tracheophytes
- Clade: Angiosperms
- Clade: Eudicots
- Clade: Asterids
- Order: Apiales
- Family: Apiaceae
- Genus: Lomatium
- Species: L. thompsonii

Binomial name
- Lomatium thompsonii (Mathias) Cronquist

= Lomatium thompsonii =

Species of flowering plant

Lomatium thompsonii, commonly known as Thompson's desertparsley, is a perennial herb of the family Apiaceae endemic to Chelan and Kittitas County in Washington, United States. It grows in open, rocky slopes and pine forests. Flowers bloom May to June.
