= Lomatium cusickii =

Scientific classification
- Kingdom: Plantae
- Clade: Tracheophytes
- Clade: Angiosperms
- Clade: Eudicots
- Clade: Asterids
- Order: Apiales
- Family: Apiaceae
- Genus: Lomatium
- Species: L. cusickii

Binomial name
- Lomatium cusickii (S.Watson) J.M.Coult. & Rose

Synonyms
- Cogswellia brecciarum M.E.Jones; Cogswellia cusickii (S.Watson) M.E.Jones; Cynomarathrum brecciarum (M.E.Jones) Rydb.; Peucedanum cusickii S.Watson

Species of flowering plant

Lomatium cusickii (Cusick's biscuitroot) is a perennial herb of the family Apiaceae. Its range is in the Northwestern United States. Its native habitats include well-drained meadows, ridges, slopes, and conifer forests.
