= Lomatium fusiformis =

Scientific classification
- Kingdom: Plantae
- Clade: Tracheophytes
- Clade: Angiosperms
- Clade: Eudicots
- Clade: Asterids
- Order: Apiales
- Family: Apiaceae
- Genus: Lomatium
- Species: L. fusiformis

Binomial name
- Lomatium fusiformis (S.Watson) J.F.Sm. & Mansfield

Synonyms
- Orogenia fusiformis S.Watson; Orogenia leibergii (J.M.Coult. & Rose) Rydb.

Species of flowering plant

Lomatium fusiformis, synonym Orogenia fusiformis, is a species of flowering plant in the carrot family. It is known by the common name California Indian potato. It is native to the western United States from California to Montana, where it grows in high mountains in rocky, gravelly habitat. The tuber of Lomatium fusiformis has been traditionally consumed by Native American tribes in the western United States.

It is a small perennial herb growing from a carrot-like tuber up to a centimeter wide. Leaves are located around the base of the plant, each with a blade made up of a few linear lobes a few centimeters in length. There is usually no stem but the inflorescence arises on a stemlike peduncle up to about 15 centimeters tall. The inflorescence is a compound umbel bearing many tiny white flowers with dark anthers.

The fruit is an ovoid body a few millimeters long lined with prominent longitudinal ribs.
