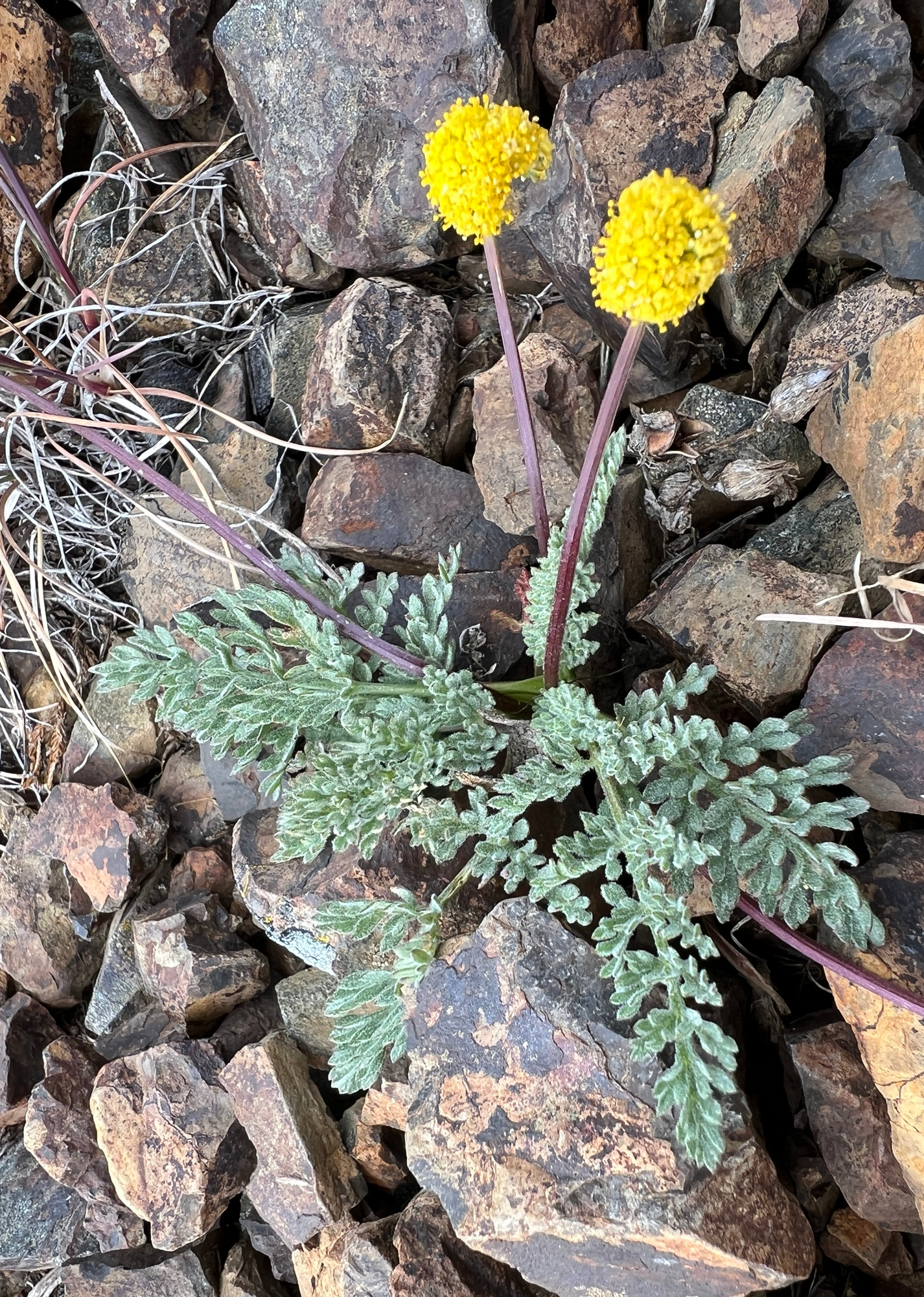

Scientific classification
- Kingdom: Plantae
- Clade: Embryophytes
- Clade: Tracheophytes
- Clade: Spermatophytes
- Clade: Angiosperms
- Clade: Eudicots
- Clade: Asterids
- Order: Apiales
- Family: Apiaceae
- Genus: Lomatium
- Species: L. watsonii

Binomial name
- Lomatium watsonii (J.M.Coult. & Rose) J.M.Coult. & Rose

= Lomatium watsonii =

Species of plant

Lomatium watsonii is a small perennial herb in the Apiaceae family with the common name of Watson's desertparsley. It is known only from mountain slopes and ridges in eastern Washington and Oregon.

== Description ==
Lomatium watsonii is a low growing herb with leaves arising directly from the crown of a thickened taproot (acaulescent). Each green leaf is multiply divided, with narrow terminal segments from 1 to 5 mm long. The leaves are usually densely covered with short white hairs. The tiny cream to yellow flowers are presented in a compound umbel atop a stout red to green stem, with broad bractlets (often partially fused) at the base of each secondary umbel. The flower stem is nearly prostrate to elevated at a moderate angle. The fruit is usually covered with very short hairs and is ovate and 6-7 mm long.

== Range and habitat ==
Lomatium watsonii is found in mountains on the east side of the Cascade crest in Washington and northern Oregon, often on exposed mountain tops or ridges in rocky soil.

== Gallery ==
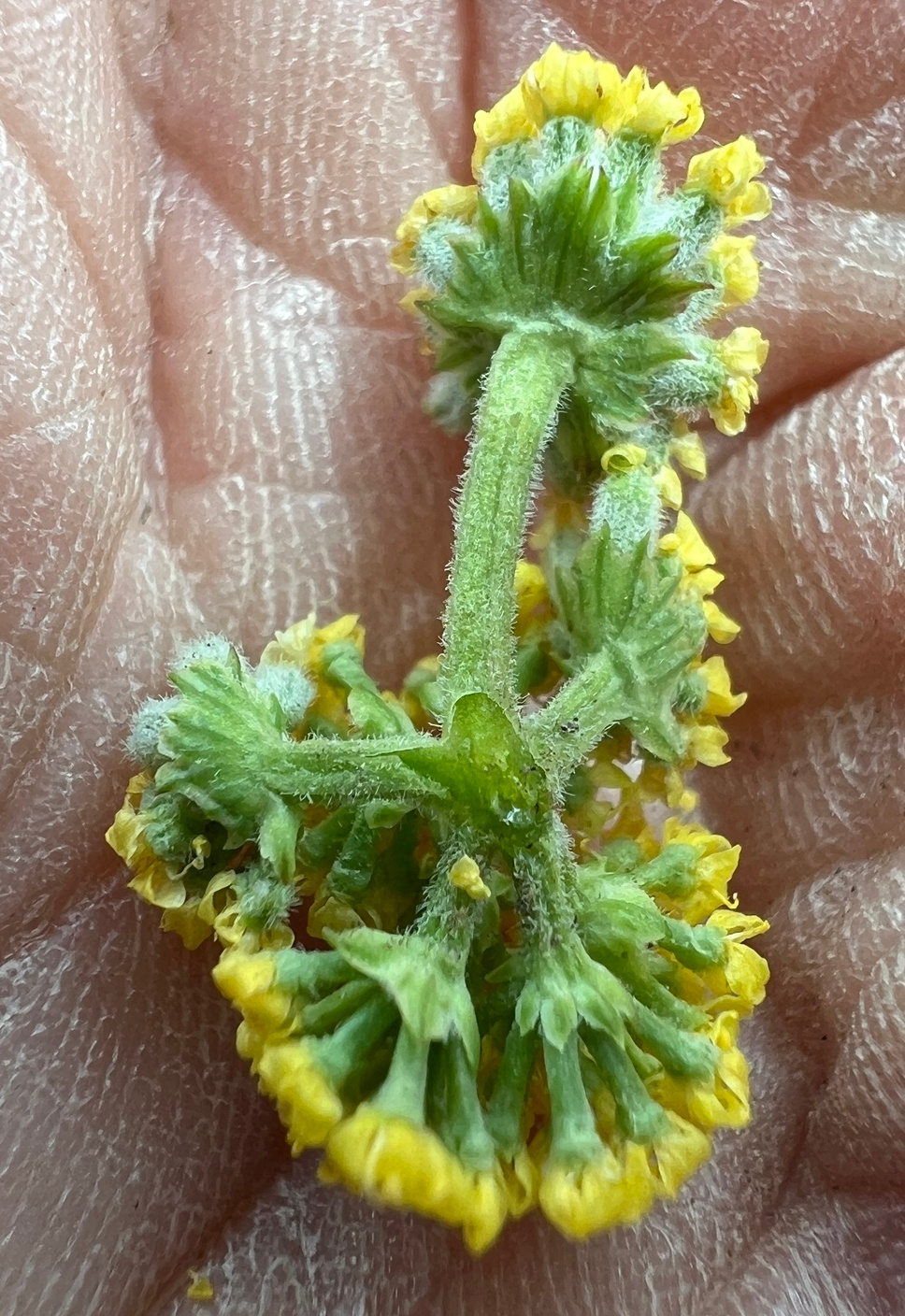
flower bractlets

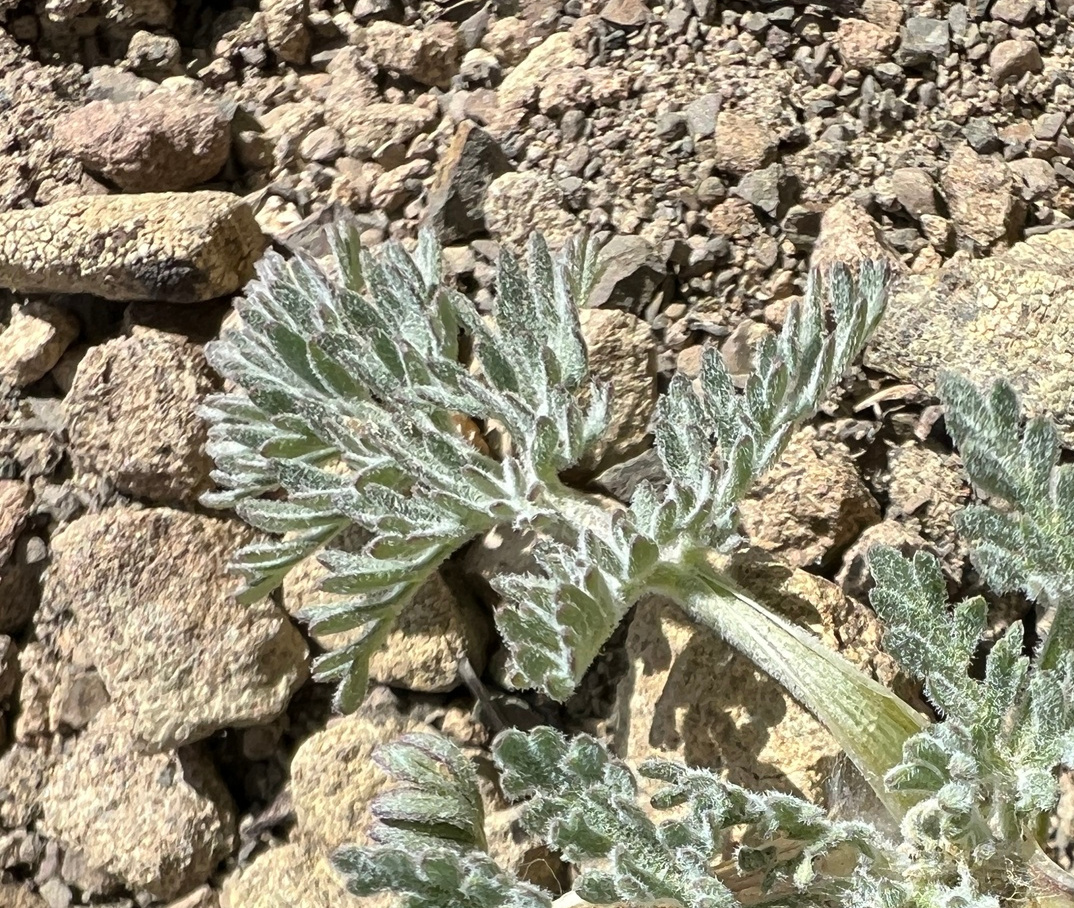
leaf
