= Lomatium shevockii =

Conservation status
- Imperiled (NatureServe)

Scientific classification
- Kingdom: Plantae
- Clade: Tracheophytes
- Clade: Angiosperms
- Clade: Eudicots
- Clade: Asterids
- Order: Apiales
- Family: Apiaceae
- Genus: Lomatium
- Species: L. shevockii

Binomial name
- Lomatium shevockii R.L.Hartm. & Constance

Species of flowering plant

Lomatium shevockii is a rare species of flowering plant in the carrot family known by the common name Owens Peak desertparsley, or Owens Peak lomatium. It is endemic to Kern County, California, where it is known from only two occurrences at Owens Peak, one of the highest points of the Sierra Nevada. It is a plant of the talus and wooded slopes of the high mountains. This species was discovered in 1984 and first described to science in 1988.

This is a perennial herb growing no more than about 12 centimeters tall from a thin taproot. There is generally no stem, the leaves and inflorescence emerging at ground level. The waxy gray-green leaf blades are made up of several very small, sharp-toothed, fleshy segments. The inflorescence is a small umbel of tiny purple flowers.
