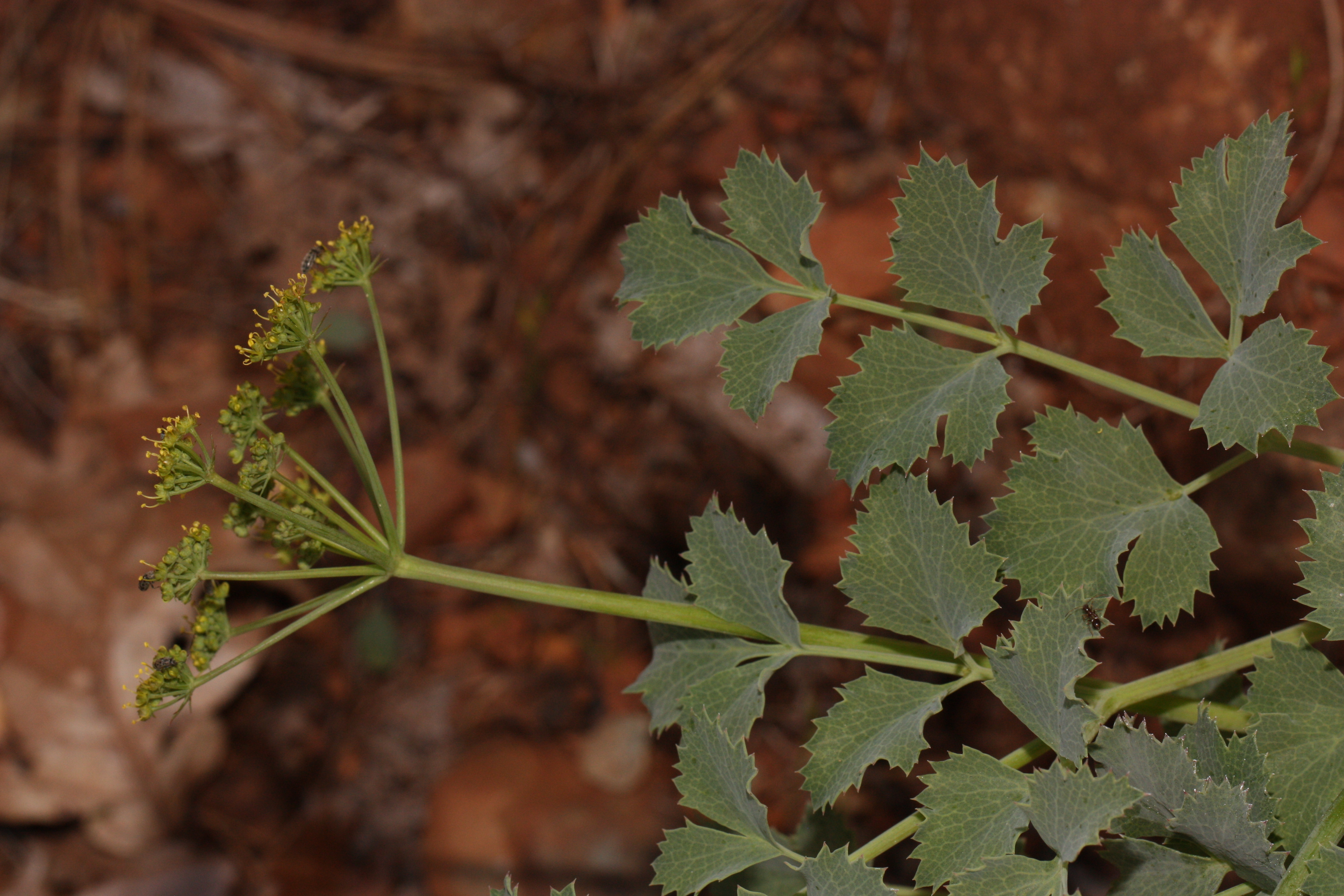

Scientific classification
- Kingdom: Plantae
- Clade: Tracheophytes
- Clade: Angiosperms
- Clade: Eudicots
- Clade: Asterids
- Order: Apiales
- Family: Apiaceae
- Genus: Lomatium
- Species: L. howellii

Binomial name
- Lomatium howellii (S.Wats.) Jeps.

= Lomatium howellii =

Species of flowering plant

Lomatium howellii is an uncommon species of flowering plant in the carrot family known by the common name Howell's biscuitroot, or Howell's lomatium. It is native to the Klamath Mountains of southern Oregon and northern California, where it is a member of the local serpentine soils flora.

== Description ==
Lomatium howellii is a perennial herb growing up to 80 centimeters tall from a thick, branching taproot. It often lacks a stem, producing upright inflorescences and leaves from ground level. The long leaves may exceed a meter long and are each made up of many oval or rounded toothed leaflets. The inflorescence is an umbel of small yellow or purplish flowers.
