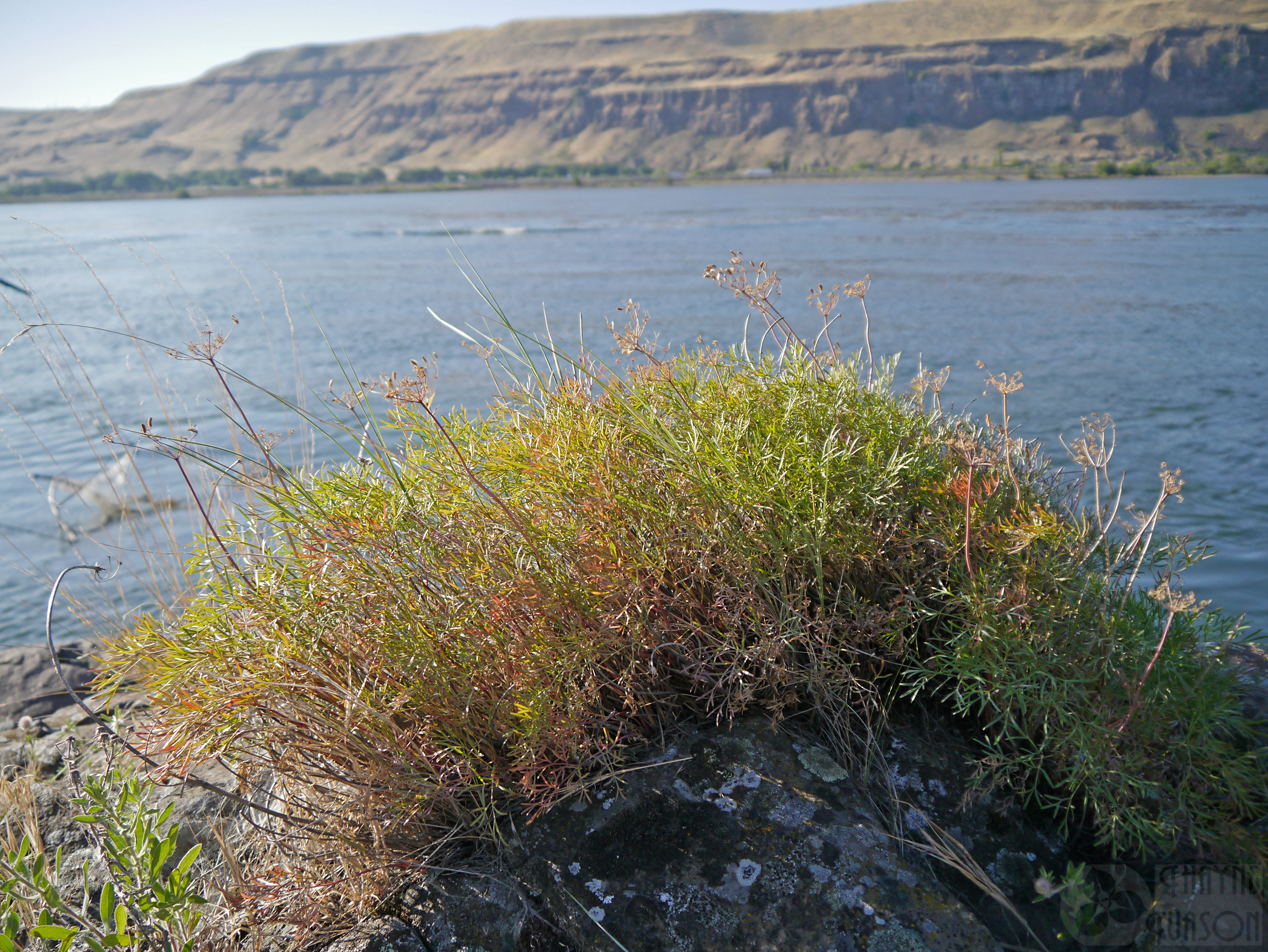

Scientific classification
- Kingdom: Plantae
- Clade: Tracheophytes
- Clade: Angiosperms
- Clade: Eudicots
- Clade: Asterids
- Order: Apiales
- Family: Apiaceae
- Genus: Lomatium
- Species: L. laevigatum

Binomial name
- Lomatium laevigatum (Nutt.) J.M. Coult. & Rose

= Lomatium laevigatum =

Species of flowering plant

Lomatium laevigatum, commonly known as slickrock biscuitroot, is a perennial herb of the Apiaceae family. It grows in basalt cliffs east of the Cascades crest in south-central Washington to Oregon. Its range is limited and considered threatened in Washington State.
