= Lomatium marginatum =

Scientific classification
- Kingdom: Plantae
- Clade: Tracheophytes
- Clade: Angiosperms
- Clade: Eudicots
- Clade: Asterids
- Order: Apiales
- Family: Apiaceae
- Genus: Lomatium
- Species: L. marginatum

Binomial name
- Lomatium marginatum (Benth.) J.M.Coult. & Rose

Species of flowering plant

Lomatium marginatum is a species of flowering plant in the carrot family known by the common name butte desertparsley. It is endemic to California, where it is known from mountains, valley, and grassland habitat, including serpentine, in the northern half of the state. It is a perennial herb growing up to about half a meter tall from a small taproot. There is no stem, and the leaves and inflorescence emerge from ground level. The purple-green leaves may approach 30 centimeters long, their blades divided into many long, narrow segments. The short but wide inflorescence bears an umbel of yellowish, purplish, or reddish flowers. The Lomatium marginatum is not currently an endangered species.
