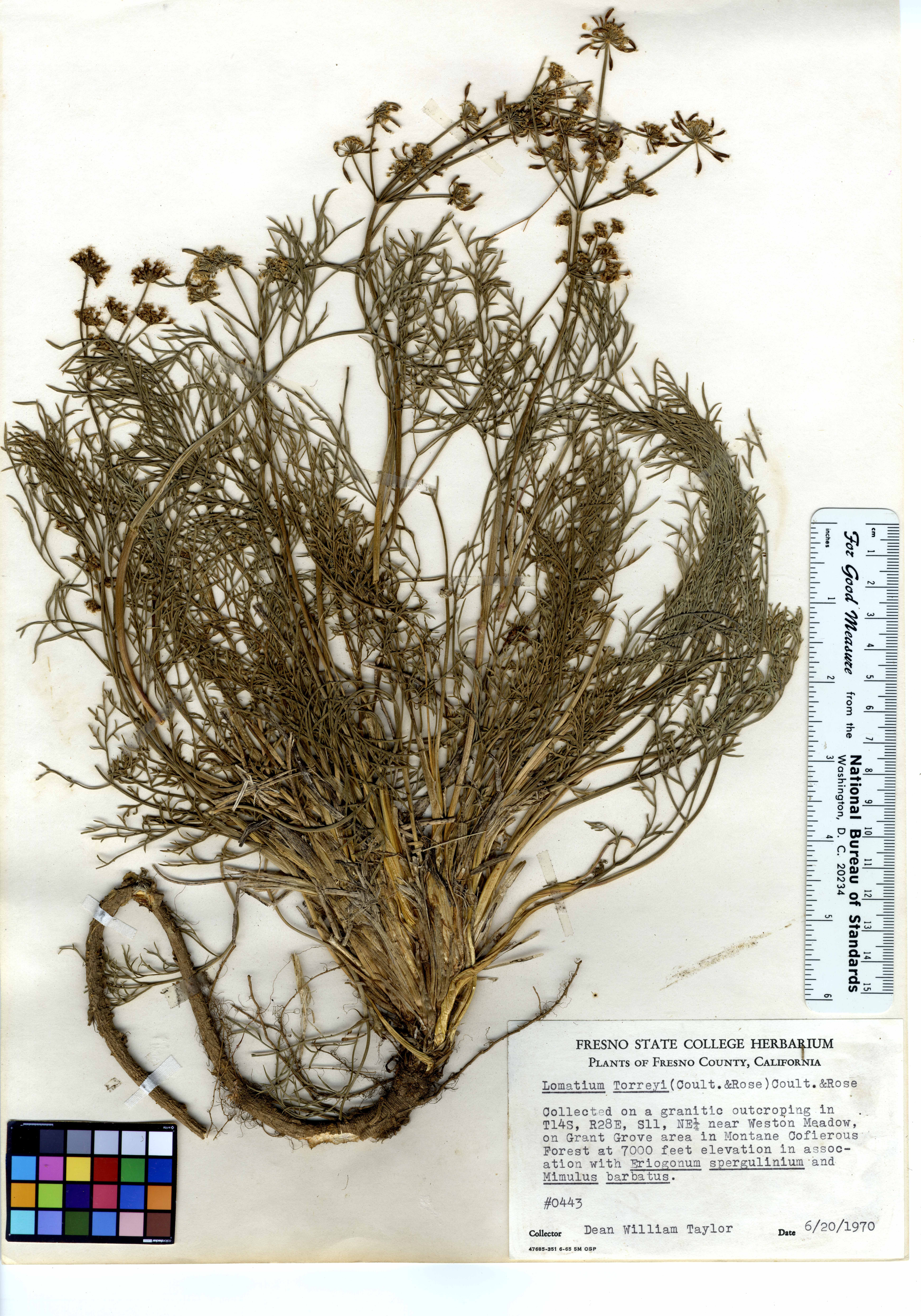

Scientific classification
- Kingdom: Plantae
- Clade: Tracheophytes
- Clade: Angiosperms
- Clade: Eudicots
- Clade: Asterids
- Order: Apiales
- Family: Apiaceae
- Genus: Lomatium
- Species: L. torreyi

Binomial name
- Lomatium torreyi J.M.Coult. & Rose

= Lomatium torreyi =

Species of flowering plant

Lomatium torreyi is a species of flowering plant in the carrot family known by the common name Sierra biscuitroot. It is endemic to the Sierra Nevada of California, where it grows in the forests of the high mountains.

== Description ==
Lomatium torreyi is a perennial herb growing up to 30 centimeters tall from a long taproot. There is generally no stem, the leaves and inflorescence emerging at ground level. The leaf blades are divided and subdivided into a mass of threadlike segments. The inflorescence is an umbel of yellow flowers.
