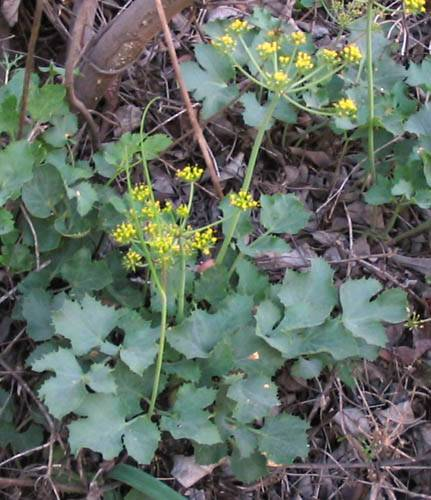

Conservation status
- Imperiled (NatureServe)

Scientific classification
- Kingdom: Plantae
- Clade: Tracheophytes
- Clade: Angiosperms
- Clade: Eudicots
- Clade: Asterids
- Order: Apiales
- Family: Apiaceae
- Genus: Lomatium
- Species: L. lucidum

Binomial name
- Lomatium lucidum (Nutt. ex Torr. & A.Gray) Jeps.

= Lomatium lucidum =

Species of flowering plant

Lomatium lucidum is a species of flowering plant in the carrot family known by the common name shiny biscuitroot. It is native to coastal mountains and canyons of southern California and Baja California, where it is a member of the chaparral plant community, including recently burned areas. It is found in the eastern Transverse Ranges and the South Coast region.

== Description ==
Lomatium lucidum is a somewhat fleshy perennial herb sometimes exceeding a meter tall. The leaves are up to about 24 centimeters long and are divided into many toothed, three-lobed leaflets each a few centimeters long. The inflorescence is a webbed umbel of yellow flowers borne on a peduncle up to half a meter tall.

== See also ==
- California chaparral and woodlands - ecoregion
- California coastal sage and chaparral - subecoregion
- California montane chaparral and woodlands - subecoregion
