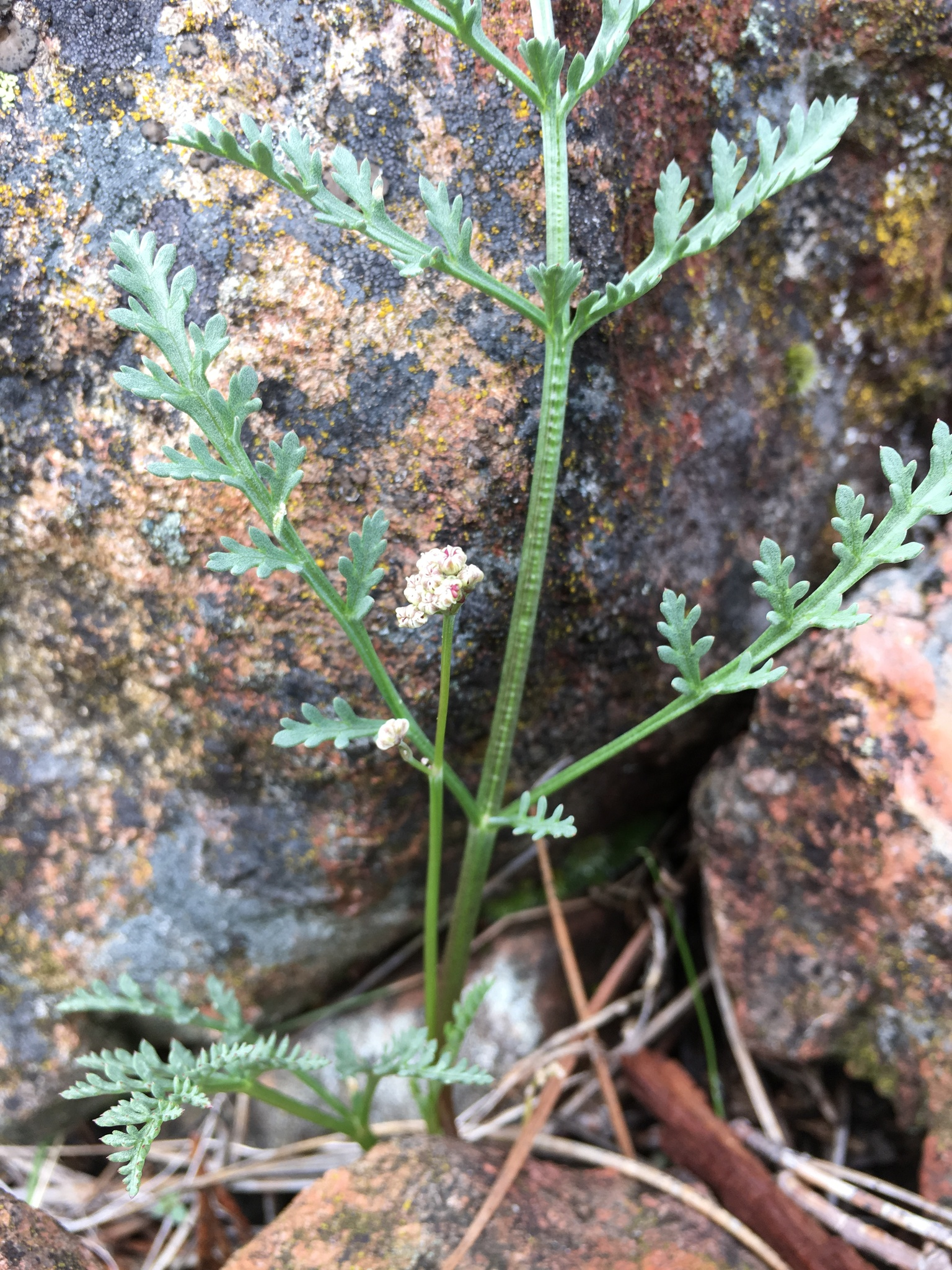

Scientific classification
- Kingdom: Plantae
- Clade: Tracheophytes
- Clade: Angiosperms
- Clade: Eudicots
- Clade: Asterids
- Order: Apiales
- Family: Apiaceae
- Genus: Lomatium
- Species: L. tracyi

Binomial name
- Lomatium tracyi Mathias & Constance

= Lomatium tracyi =

Species of flowering plant

Lomatium tracyi is a species of flowering plant in the carrot family known by the common name Tracy's desertparsley, or Tracy's lomatium. It is native to the mountains of northern California and southern Oregon, where it grows in the forests on the slopes, often on serpentine soils. It is a perennial herb growing up to 35 centimeters tall from a slender taproot. There is generally no stem, the leaves and inflorescence emerging at ground level. The leaf blades are divided and subdivided into a mass of overlapping threadlike to oval segments. The inflorescence is an umbel of yellow flowers.
