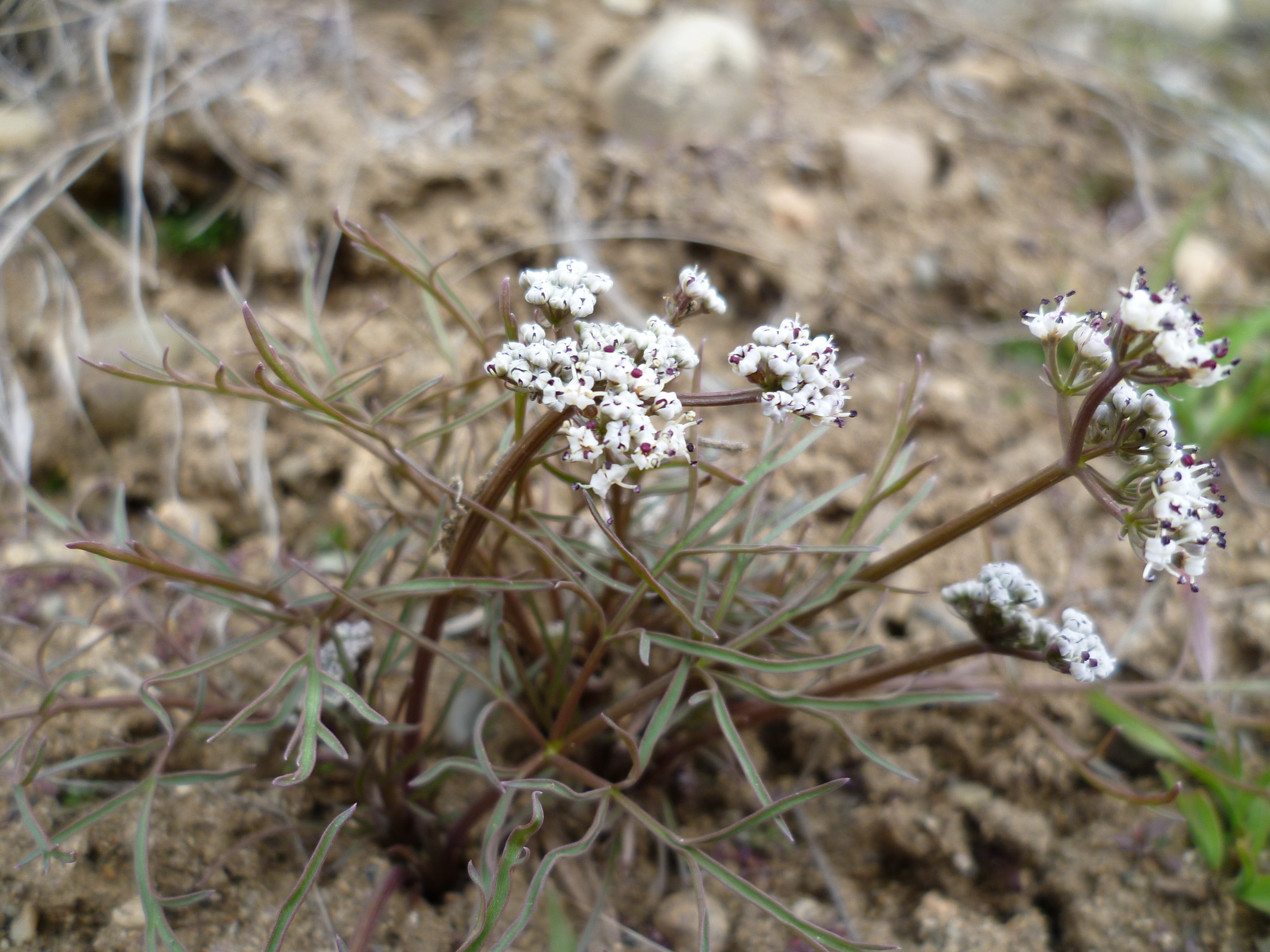
- Lomatium geyeri in Douglas County Washington

Scientific classification
- Kingdom: Plantae
- Clade: Tracheophytes
- Clade: Angiosperms
- Clade: Eudicots
- Clade: Asterids
- Order: Apiales
- Family: Apiaceae
- Genus: Lomatium
- Species: L. geyeri

Binomial name
- Lomatium geyeri (S. Watson) J.M. Coult. & Rose

= Lomatium geyeri =

Species of flowering plant

Lomatium geyeri, or Geyer's biscuitroot, is a perennial herb in the family Apiaceae found in the Northwestern United States and British Columbia.
