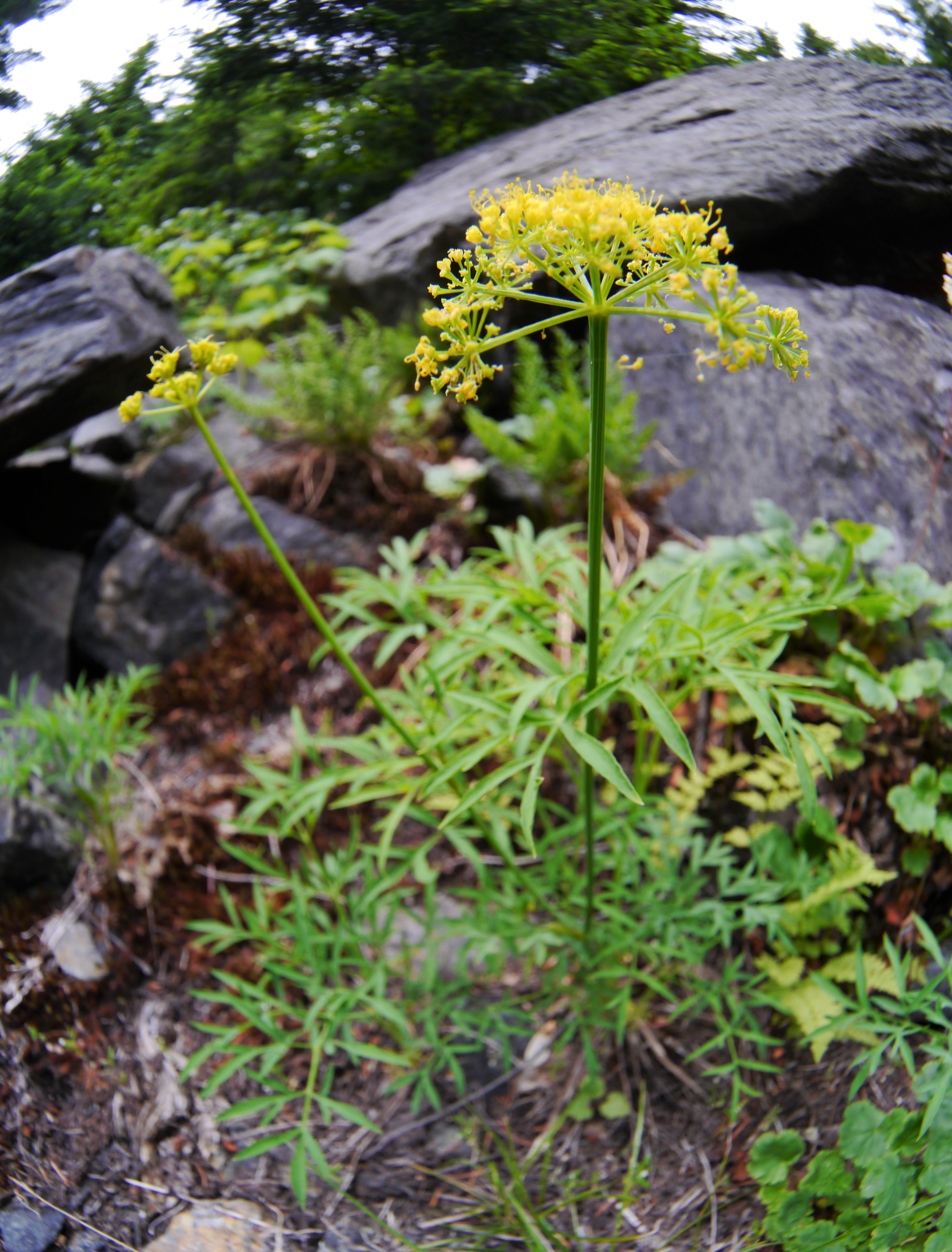
- Lomatium brandegeei alongside a tributary of Chiwakum Creek, Chelan County Washington

Scientific classification
- Kingdom: Plantae
- Clade: Embryophytes
- Clade: Tracheophytes
- Clade: Angiosperms
- Clade: Eudicots
- Clade: Asterids
- Order: Apiales
- Family: Apiaceae
- Genus: Lomatium
- Species: L. brandegeei

Binomial name
- Lomatium brandegeei (J.M.Coult. & Rose) J.F.Macbr.

= Lomatium brandegeei =

Species of flowering plant

Lomatium brandegeei, also known as Brandegee's desert-parsley, is a perennial herb of the family Apiaceae that is found in the mountains of Washington and southern British Columbia.

== Description ==
Lomatium brandegeei produces compound umbels with yellow flowers that appear from May to June. It has a relatively short taproot, and its stems are 20–60 cm tall. The leaves are multiply divided to form narrowly eliptical to obovate leaflets with a dull surface and reticulate veination. The glabrous deflexed fruits are about 1 cm long with ridges and narrow lateral wings.

== Range and Habitat ==
Lomatium brandegeei grows in the Cascade Mountains east of the Cascade crest in central to northern Washington and southern British Columbia in sparsely forested to open areas.
