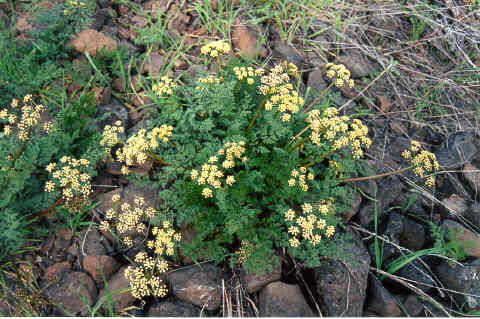

Scientific classification
- Kingdom: Plantae
- Clade: Tracheophytes
- Clade: Angiosperms
- Clade: Eudicots
- Clade: Asterids
- Order: Apiales
- Family: Apiaceae
- Genus: Lomatium
- Species: L. salmoniflorum

Binomial name
- Lomatium salmoniflorum (J.M.Coult. & Rose) Mathias & Constance

= Lomatium salmoniflorum =

Species of flowering plant

Lomatium salmoniflorum (salmonflower biscuitroot) is a perennial herb native to the northwest United States. In February and March one to nineteen umbels bloom, each with up to 300 flowers. Each flower is either strictly staminate or hermaphroditic. It has glabrous leaves that are deeply dissected into narrow blades.

== Description ==
Lomatium salmoniflorum has a particularly thick taproot and the stems are often separated at the ground, 20 to 60 cm tall. Lomatium salmoniflorum is the first Lomatium species to bloom in its area. It is often confused with Lomatium grayi, the species most similar to Lomatium salmoniflorum. Lomatium salmoniflorum flowers are not as brightly yellow as other Lomatium species. Lomatium salmoniflorum can be found growing along the Snake and Clearwater Rivers for about 100 miles (160 km).
