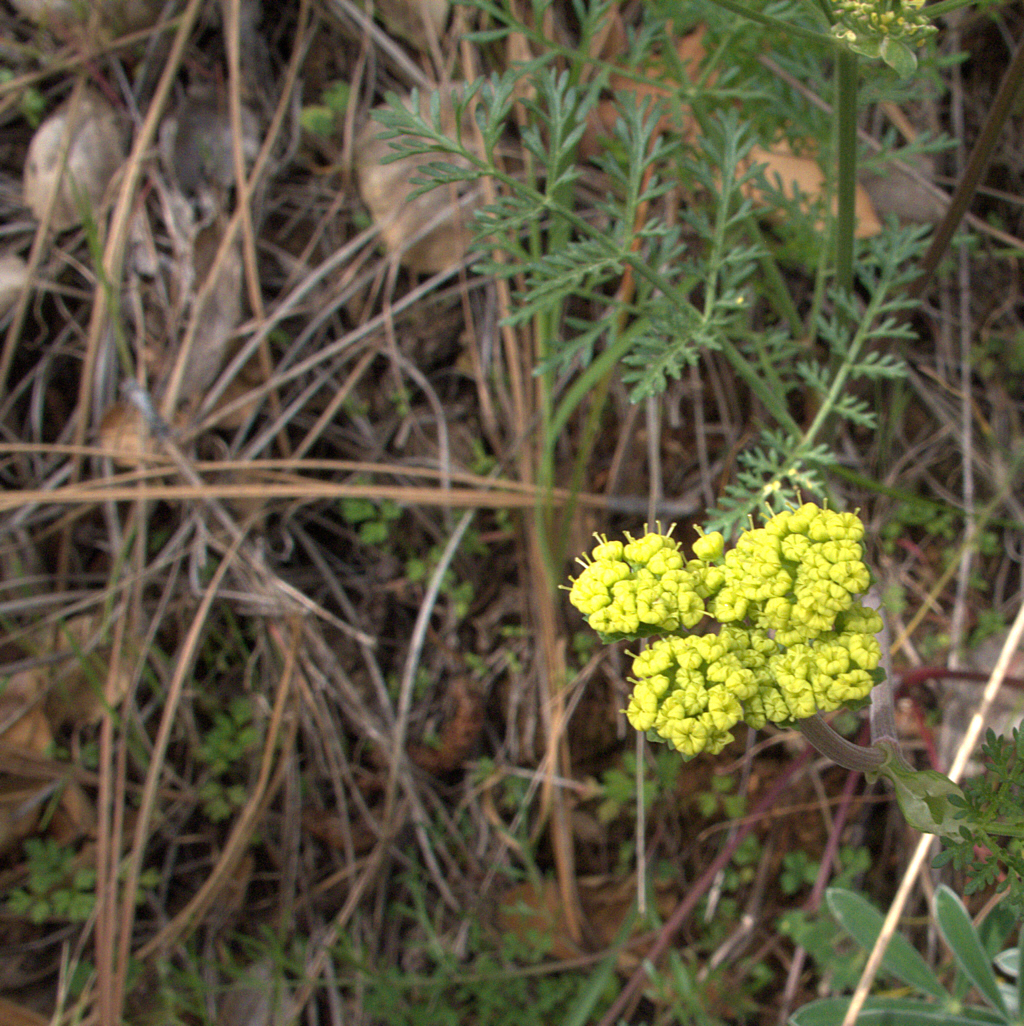

Scientific classification
- Kingdom: Plantae
- Clade: Tracheophytes
- Clade: Angiosperms
- Clade: Eudicots
- Clade: Asterids
- Order: Apiales
- Family: Apiaceae
- Genus: Lomatium
- Species: L. caruifolium

Binomial name
- Lomatium caruifolium (Hook. & Arn.) J.M.Coult. & Rose

= Lomatium caruifolium =

Species of flowering plant

Lomatium caruifolium, known by the common name alkali desertparsley, is a species of flowering plant in the carrot family.

== Distribution ==
The perennial herb is endemic to California, in the Central Valley and the foothills of the Inner California Coast Ranges and Sierra Nevada.

It grows in seasonally wet grassland and riparian areas, such as vernal pools, and other temporary and alkaline puddles.

== Description ==
Lomatium caruifolium grows from a taproot, to 15–45 centimetres (5.9–17.7 in) in height. It generally lacks a stem, producing erect leaves and inflorescences from ground level. The leaves are up to 30 centimeters long and divided into many highly divided leaflets with narrow, pointed lobes.

The inflorescence is topped with an umbel of yellowish to purplish flowers.

=== Varieties ===
- Lomatium caruifolium var. caruifolium — primarily San Joaquin Valley, Bay Area, California Coast Ranges, central Sierra Nevada foothills.
- Lomatium caruifolium var. denticulatum — primarily in the Sacramento Valley, northern Sierra Nevada foothills.
