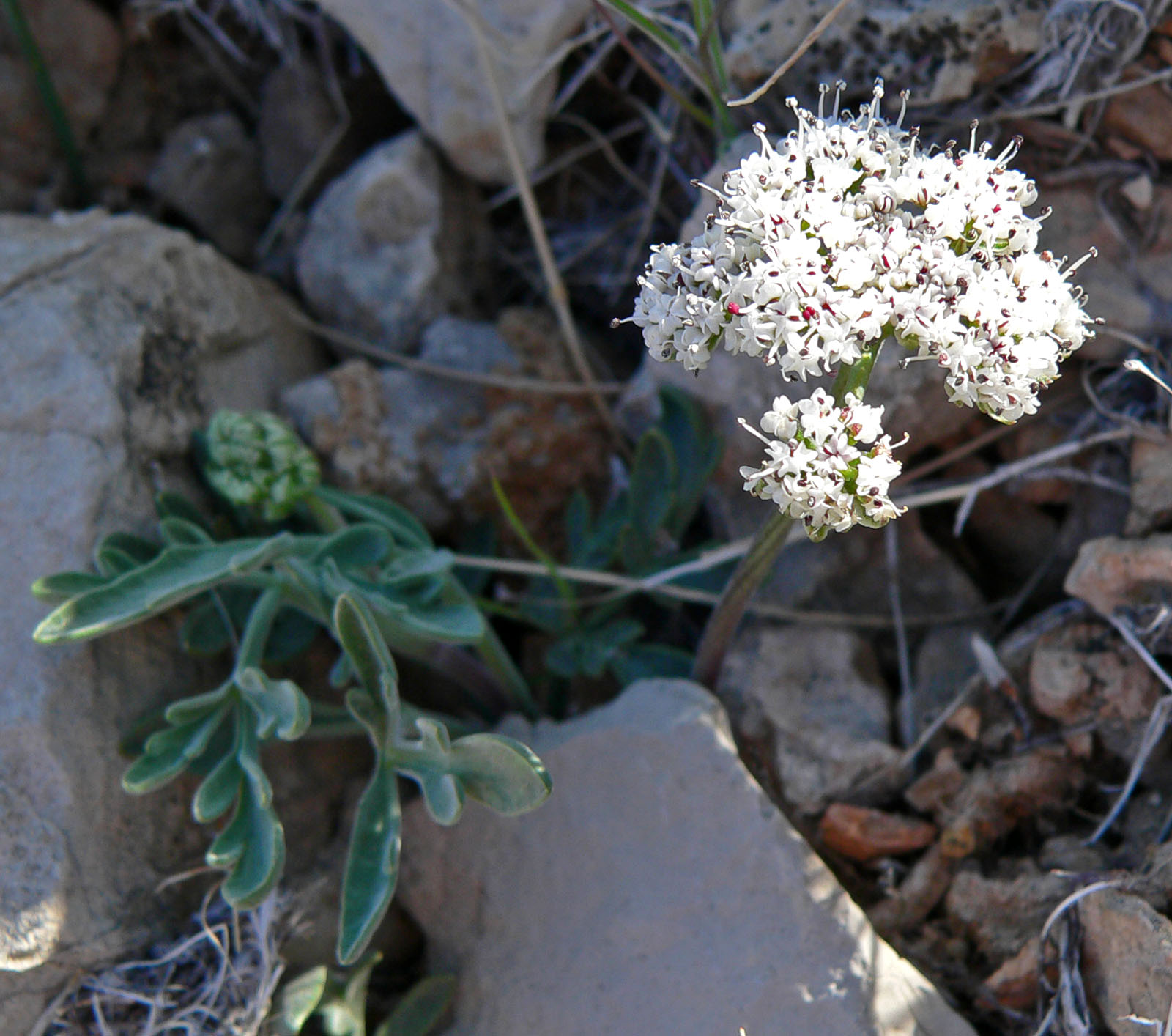

Scientific classification
- Kingdom: Plantae
- Clade: Tracheophytes
- Clade: Angiosperms
- Clade: Eudicots
- Clade: Asterids
- Order: Apiales
- Family: Apiaceae
- Genus: Lomatium
- Species: L. nevadense

Binomial name
- Lomatium nevadense (S.Watson) J.M.Coult. & Rose

= Lomatium nevadense =

Species of flowering plant

Lomatium nevadense is a species of flowering plant in the carrot family known by the common name Nevada biscuitroot. It is native to the western United States and northern Mexico, where it is known from several different habitat types, including sagebrush and woodlands. It is a perennial herb growing up to about 45 centimeters tall from a taproot. The leaves are up to about 16 centimeters long, their blades divided into many oblong pointed segments. The inflorescence is an umbel of white or cream flowers.
