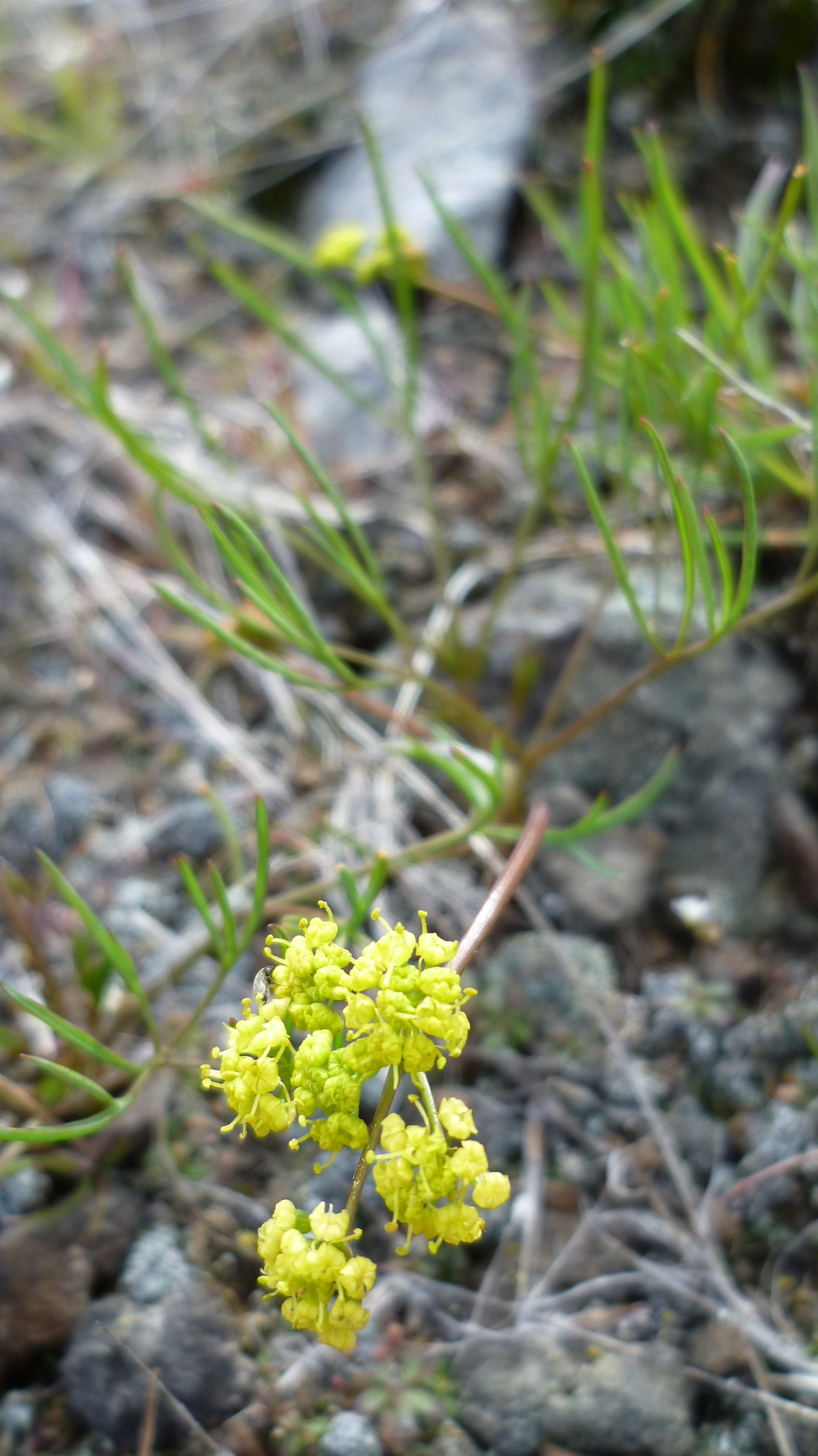
- Lomatium farinosum var. hambleniae at Colockum Wildlife Area, Chelan County Washington

Scientific classification
- Kingdom: Plantae
- Clade: Tracheophytes
- Clade: Angiosperms
- Clade: Eudicots
- Clade: Asterids
- Order: Apiales
- Family: Apiaceae
- Genus: Lomatium
- Species: L. farinosum

Binomial name
- Lomatium farinosum (Geyer) J.M.Coult. & Rose

= Lomatium farinosum =

Species of flowering plant

Lomatium farinosum, with the common name northern biscuitroot, is a perennial flowering herb of the family Apiaceae.

It is endemic to the Northwestern United States.

== Description ==
Lomatium farinosum is a small flowering perennial that flowers in early spring. It grows from a single taproot with a proportionally large nearly spherical tuber several inches deep. The glabrous leaves are dissected into a few narrow linear leaflets that are folded longitudinally. The flowers are yellow or white and the stem is glabrous.

== Range and Habitat ==
Lomatium farinosum grows mostly in shallow rocky soils and ranges from central Washington and north-central Oregon to west central Idaho, with possible observations in central southern British Columbia and western Montana.
