= Lomatium ciliolatum =

Conservation status
- Imperiled (NatureServe)

Scientific classification
- Kingdom: Plantae
- Clade: Tracheophytes
- Clade: Angiosperms
- Clade: Eudicots
- Clade: Asterids
- Order: Apiales
- Family: Apiaceae
- Genus: Lomatium
- Species: L. ciliolatum

Binomial name
- Lomatium ciliolatum Jeps.

Species of flowering plant

Lomatium ciliolatum is a species of flowering plant in the carrot family known by the common name Yolla Bolly biscuitroot. It is endemic to California, where it is known from the mountain ranges adjacent to the north and south of the San Francisco Bay Area, at 300–600 feet, 1200–2100 m. It is often a member of the serpentine soils flora in woodland and chaparral habitat.

== Description ==
Lomatium ciliolatum is a perennial herb growing 10 to 30 centimeters long from a taproot. It generally lacks a stem, producing hairy, clumpy or spreading leaves and inflorescences from ground level. The leaves are up to 7 centimeters long and divided into many highly divided leaflets with narrow lobes. The inflorescence is topped with an umbel of yellowish or purplish flowers.

== See also ==
- California montane chaparral and woodlands
