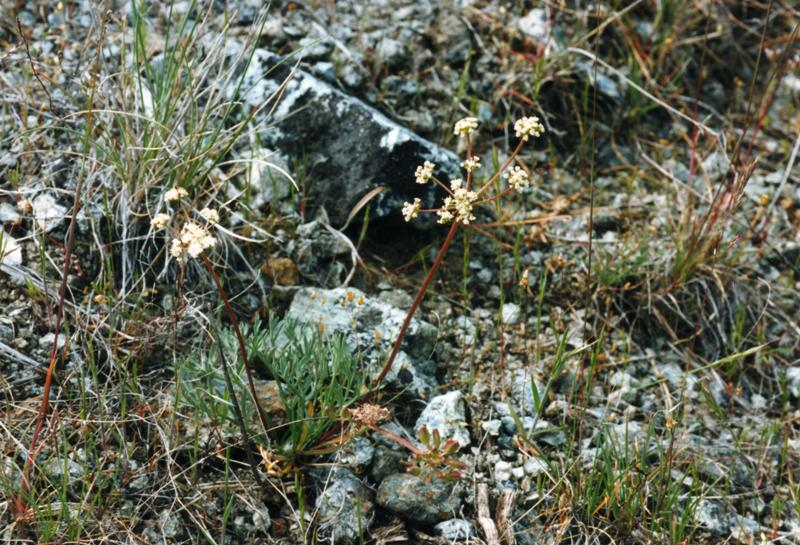

Scientific classification
- Kingdom: Plantae
- Clade: Tracheophytes
- Clade: Angiosperms
- Clade: Eudicots
- Clade: Asterids
- Order: Apiales
- Family: Apiaceae
- Genus: Lomatium
- Species: L. engelmannii

Binomial name
- Lomatium engelmannii Mathias

= Lomatium engelmannii =

Species of flowering plant

Lomatium engelmannii is an uncommon species of flowering plant in the carrot family known by the common name Engelmann's desertparsley, or Engelmann's lomatium. It is native to the Klamath Mountains of southern Oregon and northern California, where it is a member of the local serpentine soils flora.

== Description ==
Lomatium engelmannii is a perennial herb growing 10 to 30 centimeters tall from a slender taproot. It lacks a stem, producing upright inflorescences and leaves from ground level. The leaves are up to about 30 centimeters long and are intricately divided into many lance-shaped segments. The inflorescence is an umbel of purplish flowers, the clusters on spreading rays up to 13 centimeters long.
