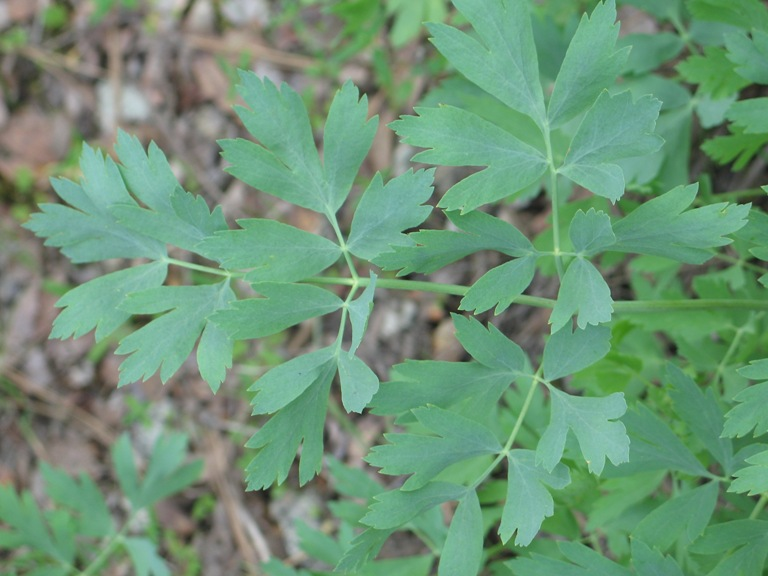

Conservation status
- Secure (NatureServe)

Scientific classification
- Kingdom: Plantae
- Clade: Tracheophytes
- Clade: Angiosperms
- Clade: Eudicots
- Clade: Asterids
- Order: Apiales
- Family: Apiaceae
- Genus: Lomatium
- Species: L. californicum

Binomial name
- Lomatium californicum (Nutt.) Mathias & Constance

= Lomatium californicum =

Species of flowering plant

Lomatium californicum is a species of plant related to the carrot and the parsnip which is known by the common names California rock parsnip, celery weed, and California lomatium.

This plant is native to California and Oregon. It is found on mountains and hills, at elevations of 150–1,800 metres (490–5,910 ft).

== Description ==
Lomatium californicum grows to 3–12 decimetres (0.98–3.94 ft). It has coarsely toothed to lobed blue-green leaves. They resemble those of common celery in both appearance and taste.

The yellow flowers are in broad umbels of 1.5–3 decimetres (5.9–11.8 in) in diameter.

== Uses ==
It is a traditional Native American food source and medicinal plant, with various parts of the plant used, including by the Kawaiisu, Yuki, and Yurok peoples. The Yuki chewed it while hunting to prevent deer from detecting human scents. The Chumash called it chuchupaste (lit. plant of great virtue) and used it to cure headaches and stomach pain.
