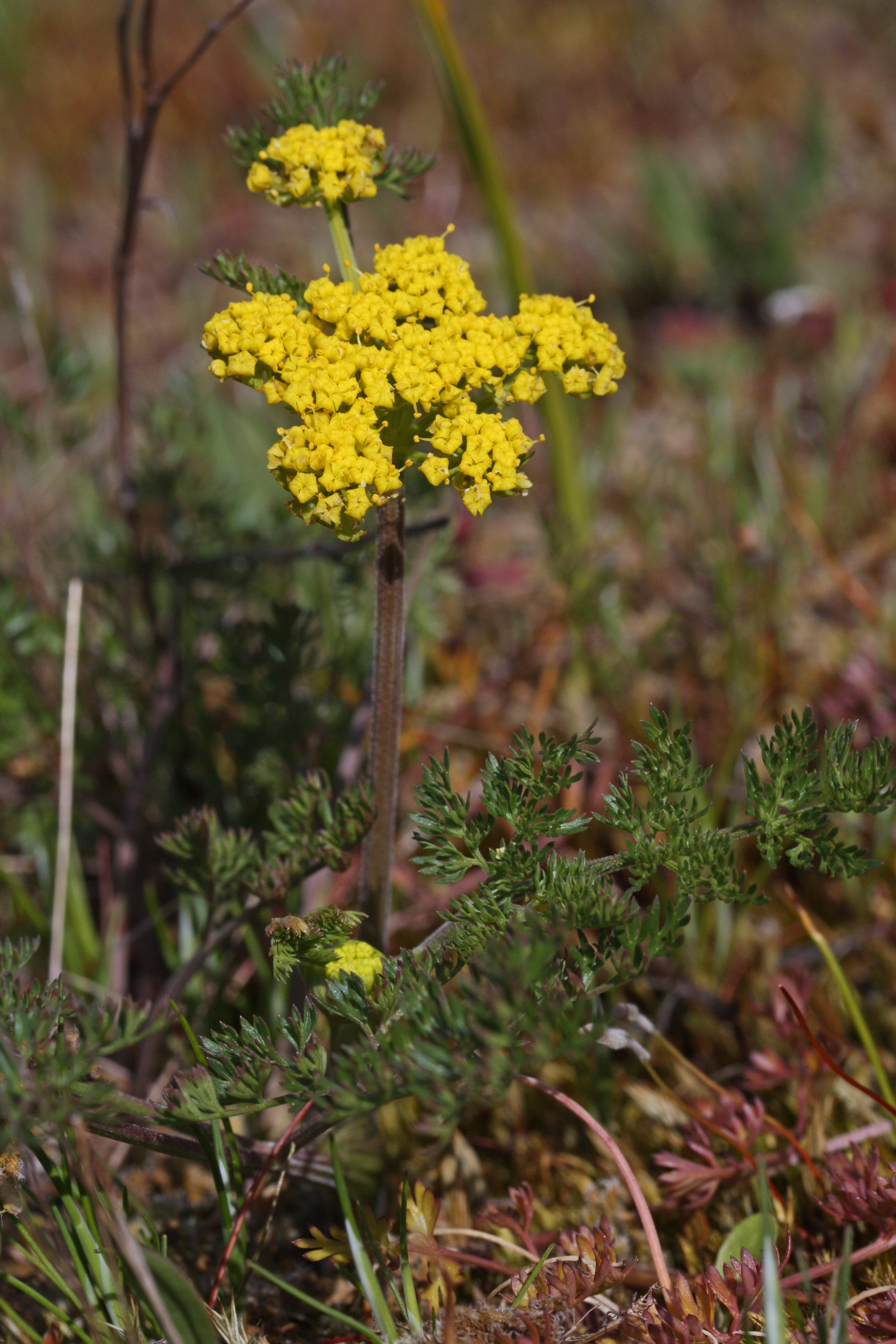
- Lomatium utriculatum

Scientific classification
- Kingdom: Plantae
- Clade: Tracheophytes
- Clade: Angiosperms
- Clade: Eudicots
- Clade: Asterids
- Order: Apiales
- Family: Apiaceae
- Subfamily: Apioideae
- Tribe: Selineae
- Genus: Lomatium; Raf.

Species
- See text.

Synonyms
- Cogswellia Spreng.; Cusickia M.E.Jones; Cynomarathrum Nutt. ex Coult. & Rose; Leptotaenia Nutt.; Orogenia S.Watson

= Lomatium =

Genus of flowering plants

Lomatium is a genus in the family Apiaceae. It consists of about 100 species. Its common names include biscuitroot, Indian parsley, and desert parsley. It is in the family Apiaceae and therefore related to many familiar edible species such as carrots and celery. Native to western Northern America and northern Mexico, some Lomatium species are extensively used by Native Americans in the inland Pacific Northwest as a staple food.

== Description ==
Lomatium roots range from woody taproots to more fleshy underground tuberous-thickened roots. The plants are green and grow the most during the spring when water is available, and many species then set seed and dry out completely above ground before the hottest part of the year, while storing the energy they gained from photosynthesizing while water was available to them in their deep roots. For most of the year, the plant is not visible; the brown tops often are blown off or easily crushed, but it lies dormant underground for the next spring.

The leaves are mainly basal and dissected (ternately, pinnately, or ternate-pinnately dissected or compound), many look like ferns or can be mistaken for them. The flowers are arranged in compound umbels, without involucral bracts (or with inconspicuous bracts). The flowers are white or yellow, more rarely a purple or maroon color. As with most Apiaceae, the fruit sets the genus apart from other yellow- or white-flowered look-alikes such as Cymopterus. Uniquely, they are dorsally flattened and winged, which can be papery or corky, but help the seed to disperse further on the wind. The dorsal ribs may or may not be on the fruit, but are narrowly winged if at all.

== Taxonomy ==
The genus Lomatium was established by Constantine Samuel Rafinesque in 1819. Kurt Sprengel published the name Cogswellia in 1920; this is regarded as an illegitimate name as it was superfluous.

=== Selected species ===
As of December 2022, Plants of the World Online accepted the following species:

- Lomatium ambiguum (Nutt.) J.M.Coult. & Rose
- Lomatium andrusianum M.Stevens & Mansfield
- Lomatium anomalum M.E.Jones ex J.M.Coult. & Rose
- Lomatium attenuatum Evert
- Lomatium austiniae (J.M.Coult. & Rose) J.M.Coult. & Rose
- Lomatium bentonitum K.M.Carlson & Mansfield
- Lomatium bicolor (S.Watson) J.M.Coult. & Rose
- Lomatium bradshawii (Rose) Mathias & Constance
- Lomatium brandegeei (J.M.Coult. & Rose) J.F.Macbr.
- Lomatium brunsfeldianum Kemper & R.P.McNeill
- Lomatium californicum (Nutt.) Mathias & Constance
- Lomatium canbyi (J.M.Coult. & Rose) J.M.Coult. & Rose
- Lomatium caruifolium (Hook. & Arn.) J.M.Coult. & Rose
- Lomatium ciliolatum Jeps.
- Lomatium columbianum Mathias & Constance
- Lomatium congdonii J.M.Coult. & Rose
- Lomatium cookii Kagan
- Lomatium cous (S.Watson) J.M.Coult. & Rose
- Lomatium cusickii (S.Watson) J.M.Coult. & Rose
- Lomatium cuspidatum Mathias & Constance
- Lomatium dasycarpum (Torr. & A.Gray) J.M.Coult. & Rose
- Lomatium depauperatum (M.E.Jones) J.A.Alexander & Whaley
- Lomatium dissectum (Nutt.) Mathias & Constance
- Lomatium donnellii (J.M.Coult. & Rose) J.M.Coult. & Rose
- Lomatium eastwoodiae (J.M.Coult. & Rose) J.F.Macbr.
- Lomatium engelmannii Mathias
- Lomatium erythrocarpum Meinke & Constance
- Lomatium farinosum (Geyer) J.M.Coult. & Rose
- Lomatium filicinum (M.E.Jones) Mansfield & M.Stevens
- Lomatium foeniculaceum (Nutt.) J.M.Coult. & Rose
- Lomatium fusiformis (S.Watson) J.F.Sm. & Mansfield
- Lomatium geyeri (S.Watson) J.M.Coult. & Rose
- Lomatium gormanii (Howell) J.M.Coult. & Rose
- Lomatium graveolens (S.Watson) Dorn & R.L.Hartm.
- Lomatium grayi (J.M.Coult. & Rose) J.M.Coult. & Rose
- Lomatium greenmanii Mathias
- Lomatium hallii (S.Watson) J.M.Coult. & Rose
- Lomatium hendersonii (J.M.Coult. & Rose) J.M.Coult. & Rose
- Lomatium hooveri (Mathias & Constance) Constance & B.Ertter
- Lomatium howellii (S.Watson) Jeps.
- Lomatium idahoense Mathias & Constance
- Lomatium insulare (Eastw.) Munz
- Lomatium junceum Barneby & N.H.Holmgren
- Lomatium juniperinum (M.E.Jones) J.M.Coult. & Rose
- Lomatium klickitatense J.A.Alexander & Whaley
- Lomatium knokei Darrach
- Lomatium kogholiini K.M.Mason & Willie
- Lomatium laevigatum J.M.Coult. & Rose
- Lomatium latilobum (Rydb.) Mathias
- Lomatium linearifolium (S.Watson) J.F.Sm. & Mansfield
- Lomatium lithosolamans J.F.Sm. & M.A.Feist
- Lomatium lucidum (Nutt.) Jeps.
- Lomatium macrocarpum (Hook. & Arn.) J.M.Coult. & Rose
- Lomatium marginatum (Benth.) J.M.Coult. & Rose
- Lomatium martindalei (J.M.Coult. & Rose) J.M.Coult. & Rose
- Lomatium minimum (Mathias) Mathias
- Lomatium minus (Rose ex Howell) Mathias & Constance
- Lomatium mohavense (J.M.Coult. & Rose) J.M.Coult. & Rose
- Lomatium multifidum (Nutt.) R.P.McNeill & Darrach
- Lomatium nevadense (S.Watson) J.M.Coult. & Rose
- Lomatium nudicaule (Nutt.) J.M.Coult. & Rose
- Lomatium nuttallii (A.Gray) J.F.Macbr.
- Lomatium observatorium Constance & B.Ertter
- Lomatium ochocense Helliwell & Constance
- Lomatium oreganum (J.M.Coult. & Rose) J.M.Coult. & Rose
- Lomatium orientale J.M.Coult. & Rose
- Lomatium papilioniferum J.A.Alexander & Whaley
- Lomatium parryi (S.Watson) J.F.Macbr.
- Lomatium parvifolium (Hook. & Arn.) Jeps.
- Lomatium pastorale Darrach & D.H.Wagner
- Lomatium peckianum Mathias & Constance
- Lomatium piperi J.M.Coult. & Rose
- Lomatium planosum (Osterh.) Mansfield & S.R.Downie
- Lomatium quintuplex Schlessman & Constance
- Lomatium ravenii Mathias & Constance
- Lomatium repostum (Jeps.) Mathias
- Lomatium rigidum (M.E.Jones) Jeps.
- Lomatium rollinsii Mathias & Constance
- Lomatium roneorum Darrach
- Lomatium roseanum Cronquist
- Lomatium salmoniflorum (J.M.Coult. & Rose) Mathias & Constance
- Lomatium sandbergii (J.M.Coult. & Rose) J.M.Coult. & Rose
- Lomatium scabrum (J.M.Coult. & Rose) Mathias
- Lomatium serpentinum (M.E.Jones) Mathias
- Lomatium shevockii R.L.Hartm. & Constance
- Lomatium simplex (Nutt. ex S.Watson) J.F.Macbr.
- Lomatium stebbinsii Schlessman & Constance
- Lomatium suksdorfii (S.Watson) J.M.Coult. & Rose
- Lomatium swingerae R.P.McNeill
- Lomatium tamanitchii Darrach & Thie
- Lomatium tarantuloides Darrach & Hinchliff
- Lomatium tenuissimum (Geyer ex Hook.) M.A.Feist & G.M.Plunkett
- Lomatium thompsonii (Mathias) Cronquist
- Lomatium torreyi (J.M.Coult. & Rose) J.M.Coult. & Rose
- Lomatium tracyi Mathias & Constance
- Lomatium triternatum (Pursh) J.M.Coult. & Rose
- Lomatium tuberosum Hoover
- Lomatium utriculatum (Nutt.) J.M.Coult. & Rose
- Lomatium vaginatum J.M.Coult. & Rose
- Lomatium watsonii (J.M.Coult. & Rose) J.M.Coult. & Rose

== Distribution and habitat ==
The species is native to western Northern America and northern Mexico.

Most lomatiums are desert species or grow on bluffs or mountain slopes where water is limited for most of the year.

== Ecology ==
It grows in a variety of habitats throughout western North America, from coastal bluffs to piles of basalt rock.

== Conservation ==
Many species' habitats are under threat by grazing, development, and wildfires. Also, some concern exists about particular species such as L. dissectum, which is mainly harvested from the wild for herbal uses.

Because the genus is so difficult to identify, but has great genetic diversity, new species are still being found today such as L. tarantuloides. Many species often have a very limited geographical range, with the plants being few in number.

== Uses ==
Several species, including L. cous, L. geyeri, and L. macrocarpum, are sometimes known as biscuit roots for their starchy edible roots. These are or have been traditional Native American foods, eaten cooked or dried and ground into flour. Some Native Americans ground Lomatium into mush and shaped it into cakes and stored them for later use. Their flavor has been compared to celery, parsnip, or stale biscuits. Lomatium continues to be harvested and eaten by Indigenous people, including members of the Confederated Tribes of the Umatilla Indian Reservation, the Confederated Tribes of the Warm Springs, and the Yakama Nation.
