= Lomatium ravenii =

Scientific classification
- Kingdom: Plantae
- Clade: Tracheophytes
- Clade: Angiosperms
- Clade: Eudicots
- Clade: Asterids
- Order: Apiales
- Family: Apiaceae
- Genus: Lomatium
- Species: L. ravenii

Binomial name
- Lomatium ravenii Mathias & Constance

Species of flowering plant

Lomatium ravenii is a species of flowering plant in the carrot family known by the common names Lassen parsley and Raven's lomatium. It is native to the Great Basin of the United States, where it grows in sagebrush and other plateau habitat, including areas with somewhat alkaline soils in Nevada, California, and other states.

== Description ==
Lomatium ravenii is a hairy, gray-green perennial herb growing 5 to 40 centimeters long from a taproot and tuber unit. There is generally no stem, the leaves and inflorescence emerging at ground level. The leaf blades are divided into segments which are subdivided into smaller oval or knoblike segments. The inflorescence is a hairy umbel of white or purple-tinged flowers with dark anthers.

Plant with fruits
