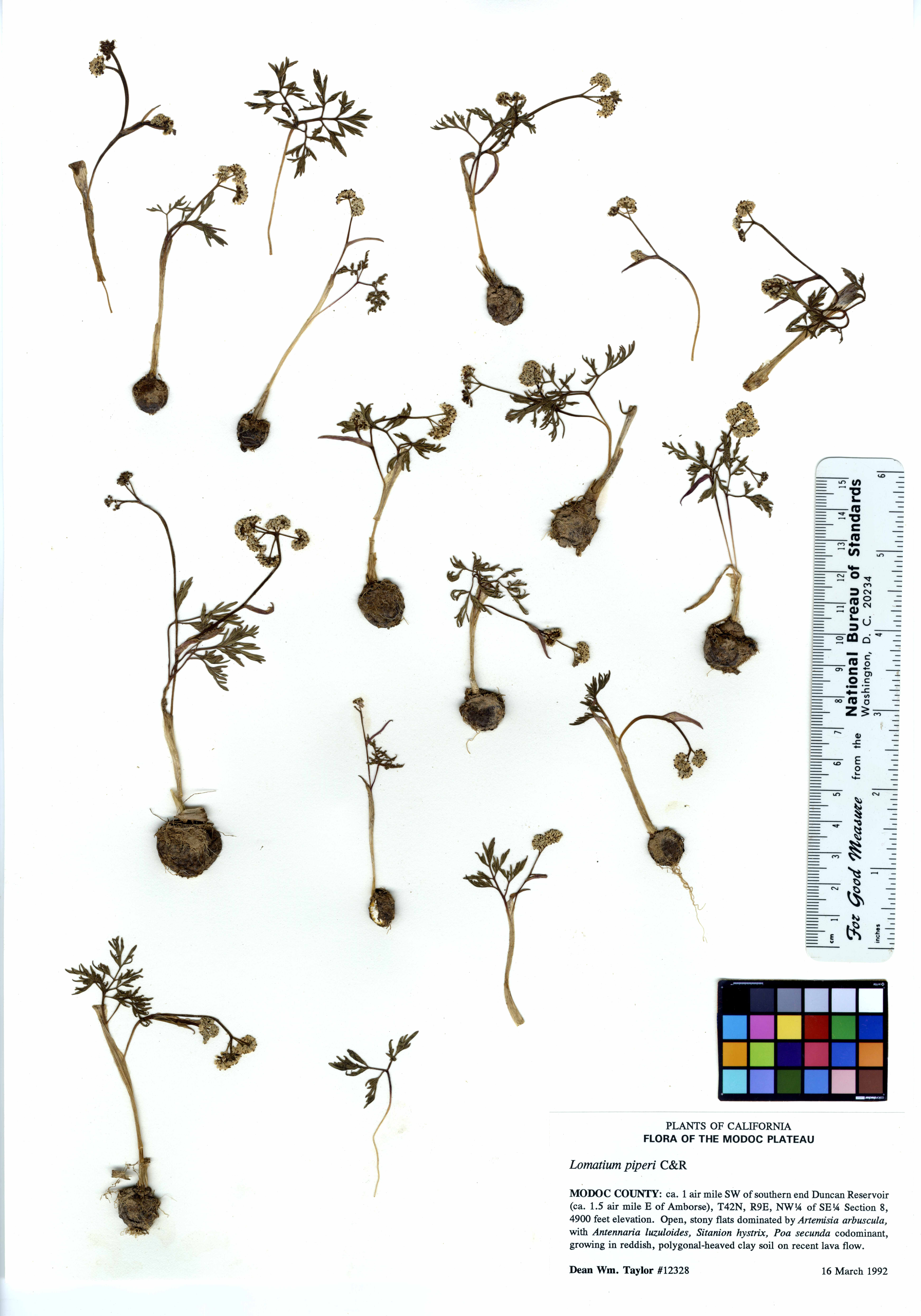

Scientific classification
- Kingdom: Plantae
- Clade: Tracheophytes
- Clade: Angiosperms
- Clade: Eudicots
- Clade: Asterids
- Order: Apiales
- Family: Apiaceae
- Genus: Lomatium
- Species: L. piperi

Binomial name
- Lomatium piperi J.M.Coult. & Rose

= Lomatium piperi =

Indian biscuitroot

Species of carrot

Lomatium piperi is a species of flowering plant in the carrot family known by the common name salt-and-pepper or Indian biscuitroot (and called mámɨn in the local Sahaptin language). It is native to the Northwestern United States and northern California, where it grows in sagebrush and plateau habitat, as well as the Sierra Nevada and Cascade Mountains.

== Description ==
Lomatium piperi is a perennial herb growing up to about 25 centimeters long from a spherical tuber no more than a centimeter wide. There is generally no stem, and the leaves and inflorescence emerge at ground level. The leaf blades are divided into segments which are subdivided into narrow, flat lobes. The inflorescence is an umbel of white flowers with dark anthers.
