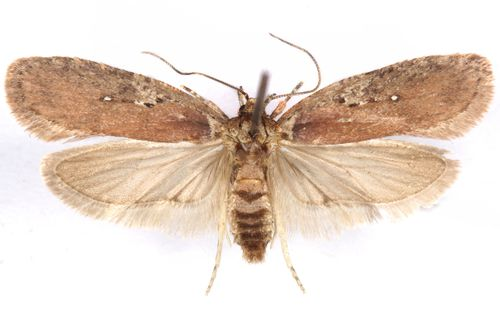

Scientific classification
- Kingdom: Animalia
- Phylum: Arthropoda
- Clade: Pancrustacea
- Class: Insecta
- Order: Lepidoptera
- Family: Depressariidae
- Genus: Agonopterix
- Species: A. oregonensis

Binomial name
- Agonopterix oregonensis J. F. G. Clarke, 1941

= Agonopterix oregonensis =

Species of moth

Agonopterix oregonensis is a moth in the family Depressariidae. It was described by John Frederick Gates Clarke in 1941. It is found in North America, where it has been recorded from California to southern British Columbia.

The wingspan is 15–18 mm. The forewings are brownish fuscous, heavily overlaid with brick-red scales. The base of the wing and costa to the middle are light grey. The light-grey scaling diminishes beyond the middle of the wing and the extreme costal edge is bright pink spotted with black. There is much black scaling along the costa, inside the greyish area and along the veins toward the apex, as well as a conspicuous white spot encircled with black scales at the end of the cell. There are also two small black spots at the basal third, followed by white scaling. The hindwings are dark smoky fuscous.

The larvae feed on Lomatium caruifolium, Lomatium marginatum, Lomatium nudicaule, Lomatium utriculatum, Angelica hendersonii, Angelica lucida, Eryngium vaseyi, Oenanthe sarmentosa, Sanicula bipinnatifida, Sanicula laciniata, Sanicula nevadensis and Sanicula tuberosa.
