= Hacquetia =

Hacquetia may refer to:

- Hacquetia (fish), a genus of prehistoric fishes in the order Clupeiformes
- Hacquetia (journal), academic journal from Slovenia
- Hacquetia, a former plant genus in the family Apiaceae with the only species now Sanicula epipactis
