= Snakeroot =

Snakeroot may refer to different plant taxa that have been used as a folk remedy against snakebites:

- Ageratina – a genus with species native to the warm and temperate Americas
- Certain plants in the temperate Northern Hemisphere genus Eupatorium
- Aristolochia serpentaria – Virginia snakeroot
- Asarum canadense – Canadian snakeroot
- Bistorta officinalis – snakeroot
- Eryngium cuneifolium – Snakeroot
- Plantago major – Snakeroot
- Polygala senega – Seneca snakeroot
- Rauvolfia serpentina – Indian snakeroot

== See also ==
- Black snakeroot (disambiguation)
