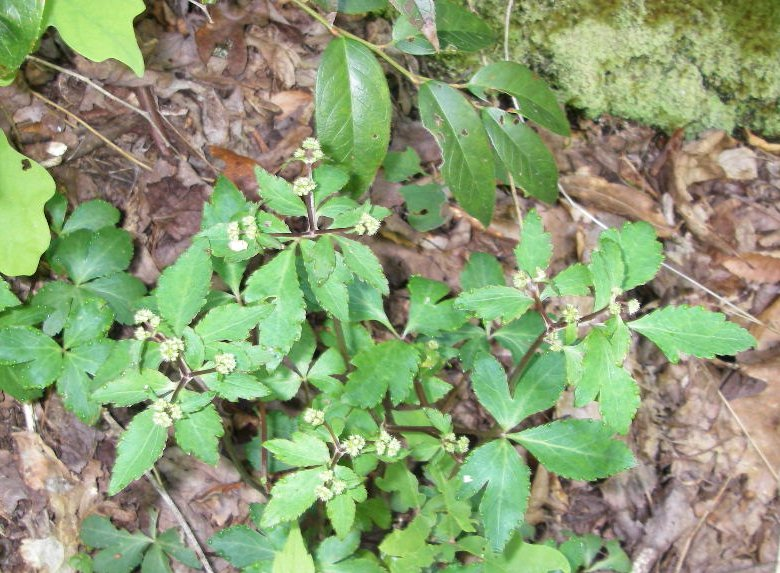

Conservation status
- Secure (NatureServe)

Scientific classification
- Kingdom: Plantae
- Clade: Tracheophytes
- Clade: Angiosperms
- Clade: Eudicots
- Clade: Asterids
- Order: Apiales
- Family: Apiaceae
- Genus: Sanicula
- Species: S. smallii

Binomial name
- Sanicula smallii E.P.Bicknell (1897)

= Sanicula smallii =

Species of flowering plant

Sanicula smallii is a flowering herb of the carrot family, Apiaceae. It is known by the common names Small's blacksnakeroot or southern snakeroot. It is found throughout the southeastern United States.

== Description ==
S. smallii is a perennial. It often reaches a height between 2 and 8 decimeters (7.8 to 31.5 inches). Leaves may be suborbicular to ovate in shape are 5 to 20 centimeters (approximately 2 to 8 inches) long. Individuals produce flowers that are white, yellow, or greenish in color.

== Habitat ==
Within the United States' Coastal Plain, this species has been observed growing in habitats such as deciduous woodlands, mixed pine-hardwood forests, and areas with loamy soil.
