= Sanicula uralensis =

Scientific classification
- Kingdom: Plantae
- Clade: Tracheophytes
- Clade: Angiosperms
- Clade: Eudicots
- Clade: Asterids
- Order: Apiales
- Family: Apiaceae
- Genus: Sanicula
- Species: S. uralensis

Binomial name
- Sanicula uralensis Kleopow ex Kamelin, Czubarov & Shmakov

Species of flowering plant

Sanicula uralensis is a species of flowering plant in the black snakeroot genus Sanicula, family Apiaceae. Native to western Siberia, it prefers to live in wetter areas in the undergrowth of both deciduous and coniferous mountain forests.
