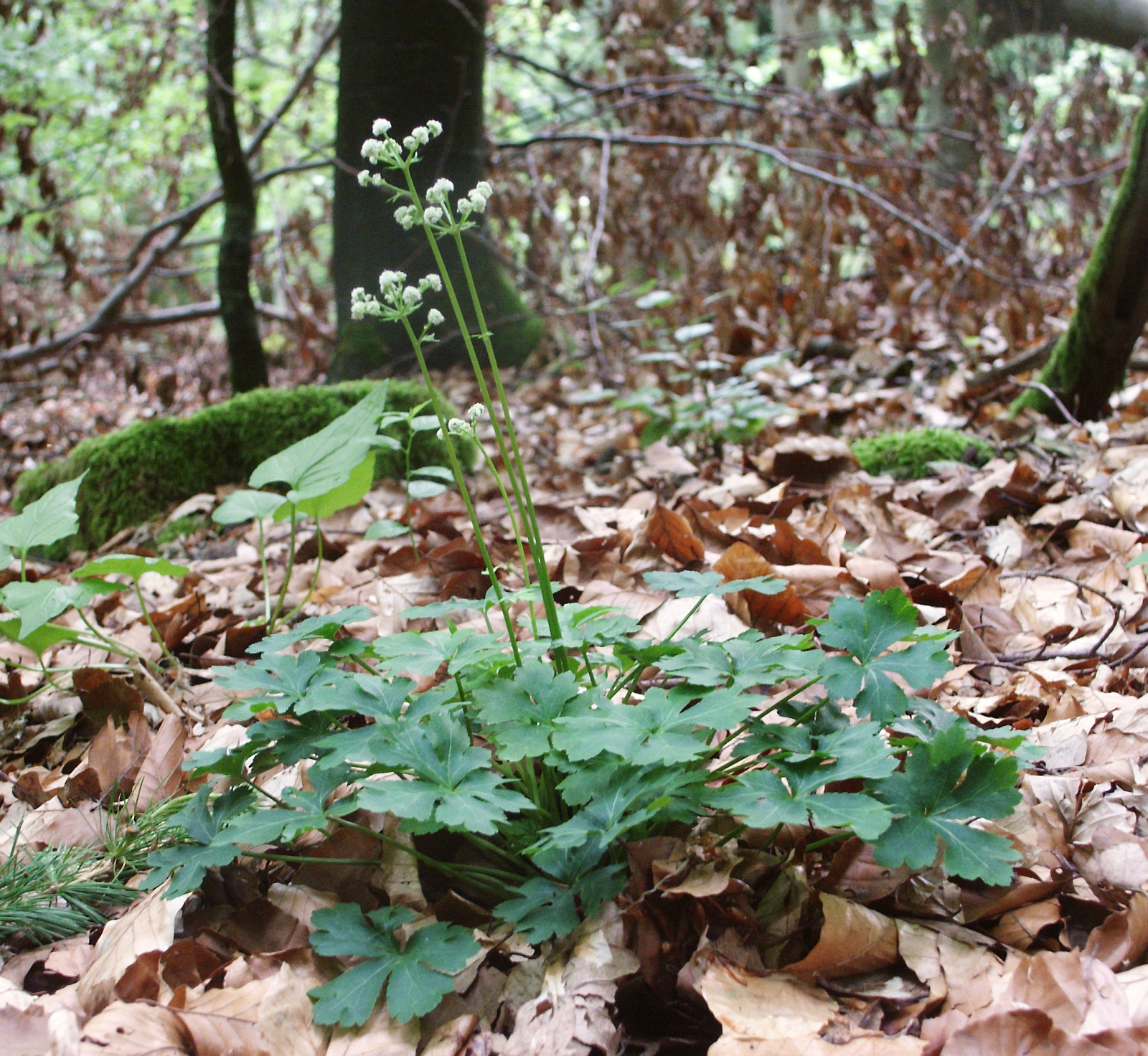

Conservation status
- Least Concern (IUCN 3.1) (Europe regional assessment)

Scientific classification
- Kingdom: Plantae
- Clade: Tracheophytes
- Clade: Angiosperms
- Clade: Eudicots
- Clade: Asterids
- Order: Apiales
- Family: Apiaceae
- Genus: Sanicula
- Species: S. europaea

Binomial name
- Sanicula europaea L.

= Sanicula europaea =

Sanicle

Species of flowering plant

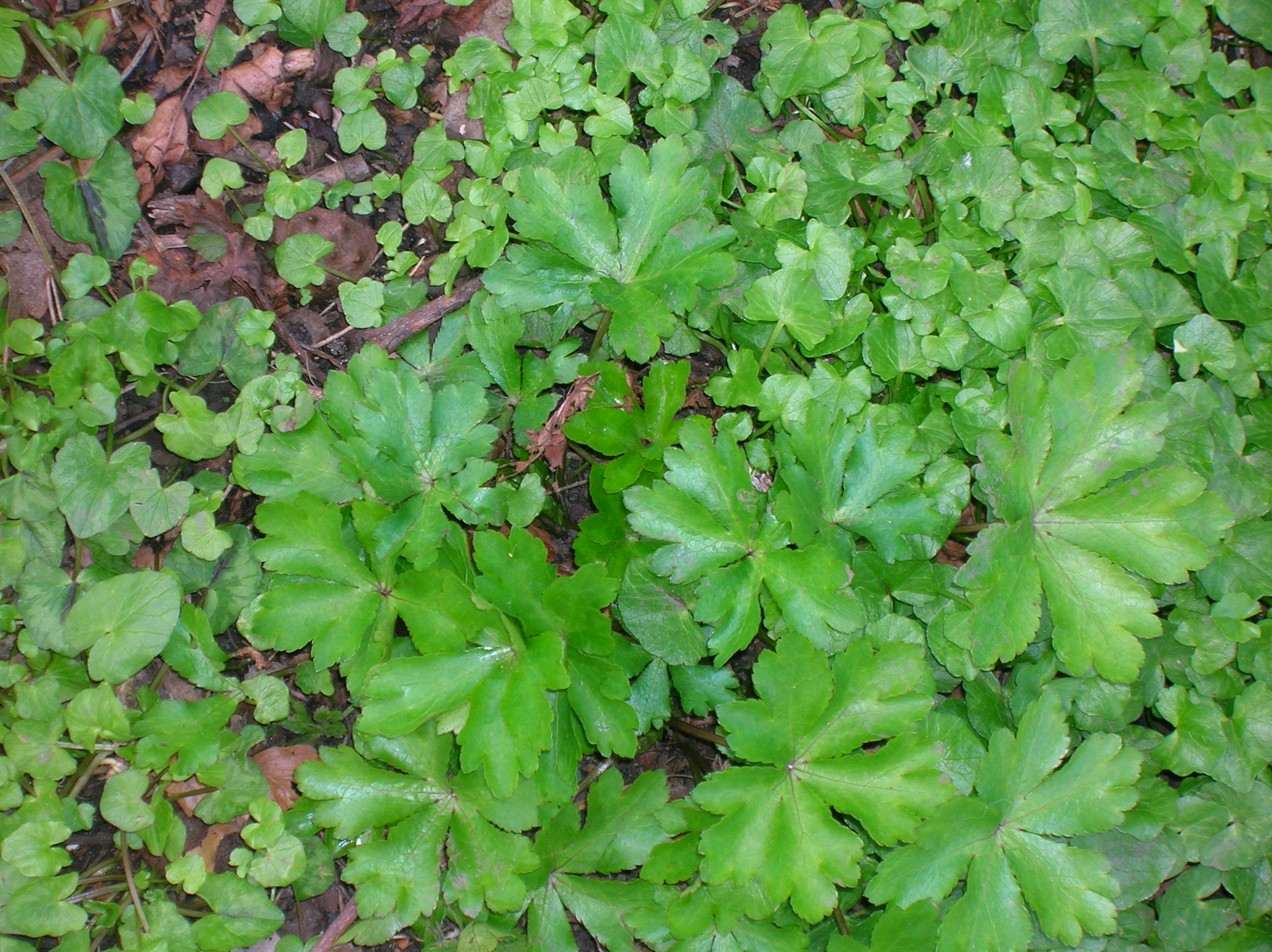
Sanicle amongst Celandine.

Sanicula europaea, the sanicle or wood sanicle, is a perennial plant of the family Apiaceae.

It has traditionally been a favoured ingredient of many herbal remedies, and of it was said "he who has sanicle and self-heal needs neither physician nor surgeon".

== Description ==
Sanicula europea L. grows to 60 cm high and is glabrous with coarsely toothed leaves. The pinkish flowers are borne in tight spherical umbels and are followed by bristly fruits which easily attach to clothing or animal fur and are thus easily distributed. The leaves are lobed and glossy, dark green.

== Habitat ==
It is widespread in shady places in woodland across Europe.

== Etymology ==
Sanicula comes from sanus, Latin for "healthy", reflecting its use in traditional remedies.

== Uses ==
Sanicula europaea was used in Europe for healing wounds and cleaning. Filtered leaf extracts of sanicula europaea have shown some antiviral properties, inhibiting the replication of type 2 Human parainfluenza viruses (HPIV-2).

Infusions of sanicle, made with water or wine, were commonly used in France to cure dysentery, ulcers and kidney injuries. To this list Culpeper added that sanicle heals tumours in any part of the body, and alleviates gonorrhoea, bowel pain and more.

The roots have been used in the traditional Austrian medicine internally (as tea) or externally (as ointment) for treatment of disorders of the skin, respiratory tract, locomotor system, gastrointestinal tract, and infections.
