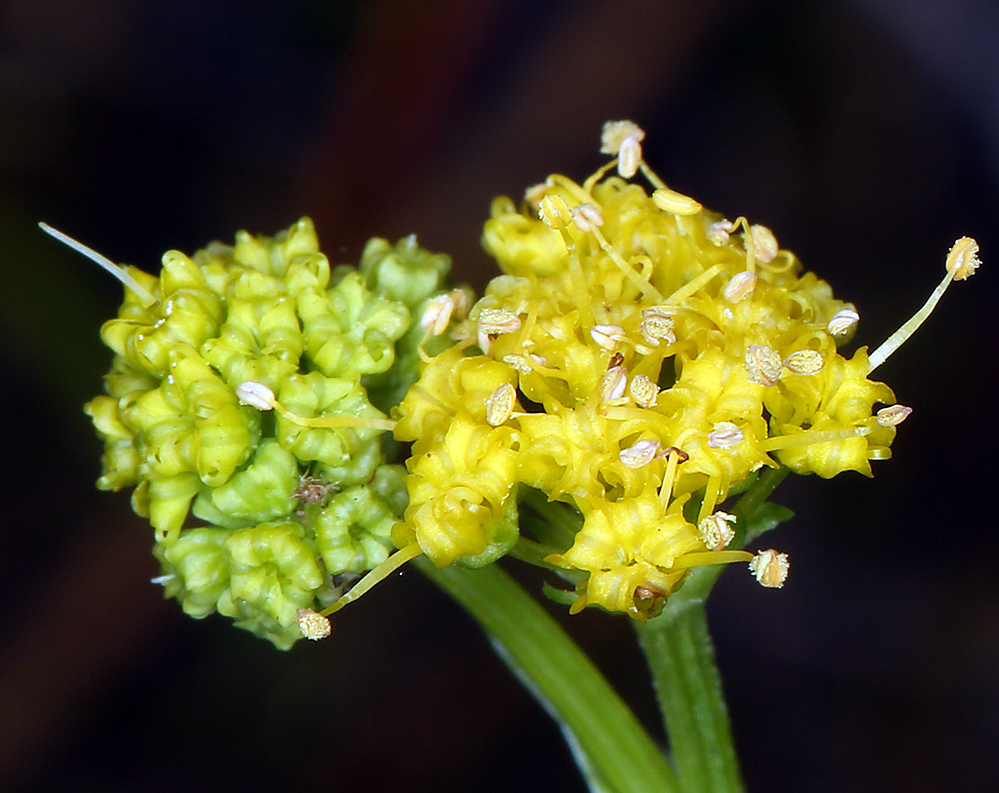

Scientific classification
- Kingdom: Plantae
- Clade: Tracheophytes
- Clade: Angiosperms
- Clade: Eudicots
- Clade: Asterids
- Order: Apiales
- Family: Apiaceae
- Genus: Sanicula
- Species: S. peckiana

Binomial name
- Sanicula peckiana J.F.Macbr.

= Sanicula peckiana =

Species of flowering plant

Sanicula peckiana is an uncommon species of flowering plant in the family Apiaceae known by the common names Peck's blacksnakeroot and Peck's sanicle. It is native to the Klamath Mountains of southern Oregon and far northern California, where it grows in chaparral and woodland habitat, often on serpentine soils. It is a perennial herb growing to a maximum height near 40 centimeters. The leaves are simple or divided into a number of lobes, the edges generally with sharp teeth. The inflorescence is made up of one or more heads of bisexual and male-only flowers with tiny, curving, yellow petals. The fruits are borne singly or in heads of up to five, each fruit covered in bumpy tubercles and sometimes with prickles near the tip.
