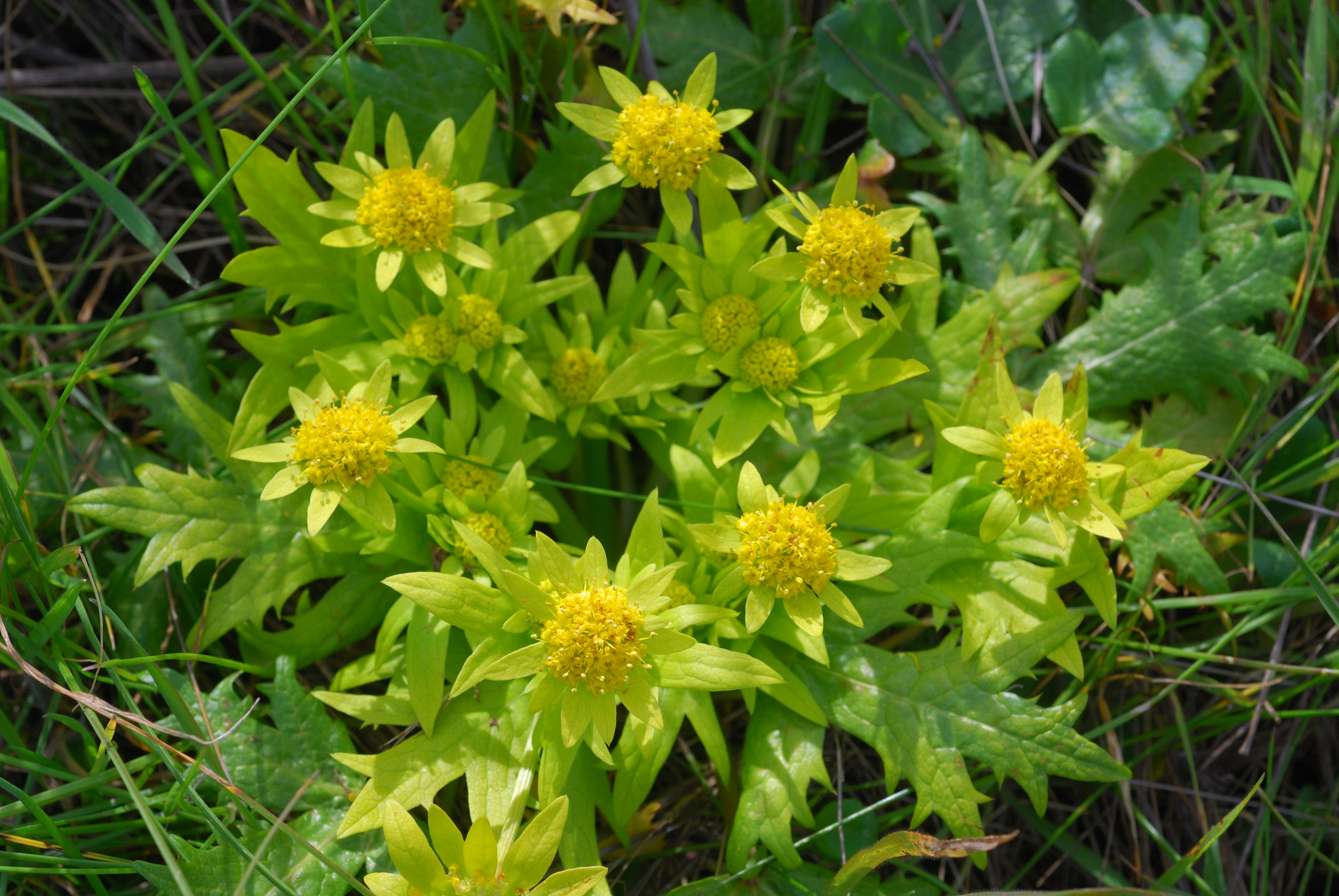

Conservation status
- Secure (NatureServe)

Scientific classification
- Kingdom: Plantae
- Clade: Embryophytes
- Clade: Tracheophytes
- Clade: Spermatophytes
- Clade: Angiosperms
- Clade: Eudicots
- Clade: Asterids
- Order: Apiales
- Family: Apiaceae
- Genus: Sanicula
- Species: S. arctopoides

Binomial name
- Sanicula arctopoides Hook. & Arn.

= Sanicula arctopoides =

Species of herb

Sanicula arctopoides is a species of sanicle known commonly as footsteps of spring, bear's foot sanicle or yellow mats.

== Distribution and Range ==
Sanicula arctopoides is perennial herb found on the west coast of the United States and Canada, from the southern end of Vancouver Island (and adjacent islands) in British Columbia, to the central coast of California. It grows in close proximity to the ocean throughout its range.

== Description ==
Taprooted perennial with short, thick branches which may be prostrate or slightly erect. The leaves are yellowish-green and carrot-like or maple-shaped, and the tiny yellow flowers are borne in umbels with prominent bracts. The plants grow in low matted patches along the ground, resembling "footsteps" of yellow against the ground.

== Conservation status ==
Sanicula arctopoides is a protected species in some areas. In Canada, the species is known from only eight remaining locations on the south coast of British Columbia where it is listed as vulnerable under the Species at Risk Act. In Washington, the species is critically imperilled.
