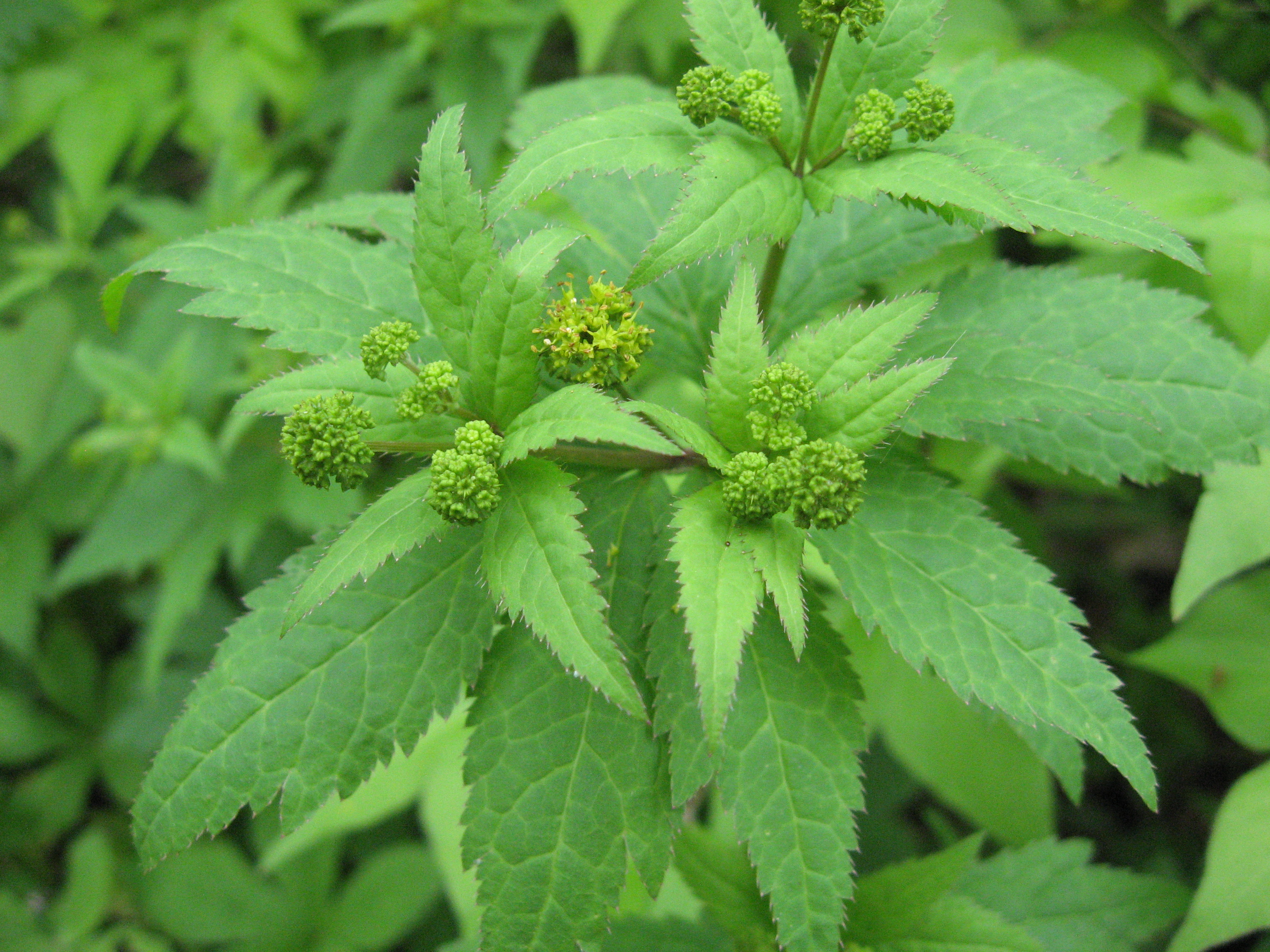

Scientific classification
- Kingdom: Plantae
- Clade: Tracheophytes
- Clade: Angiosperms
- Clade: Eudicots
- Clade: Asterids
- Order: Apiales
- Family: Apiaceae
- Genus: Sanicula
- Species: S. odorata

Binomial name
- Sanicula odorata K.M. Pryer & L.R.Phillippe

Synonyms
- Sanicula gregaria

= Sanicula odorata =

Species of flowering plant

Sanicula odorata, commonly called the clustered blacksnakeroot, is a flowering plant in the family Apiaceae. It is native and widespread in eastern North America. It grows in nutrient-rich woods, often in mesic forests and bottomlands. It is able to tolerate somewhat degraded habitats, and is not considered a particularly conservative species.

It flowers in the late spring and early summer.

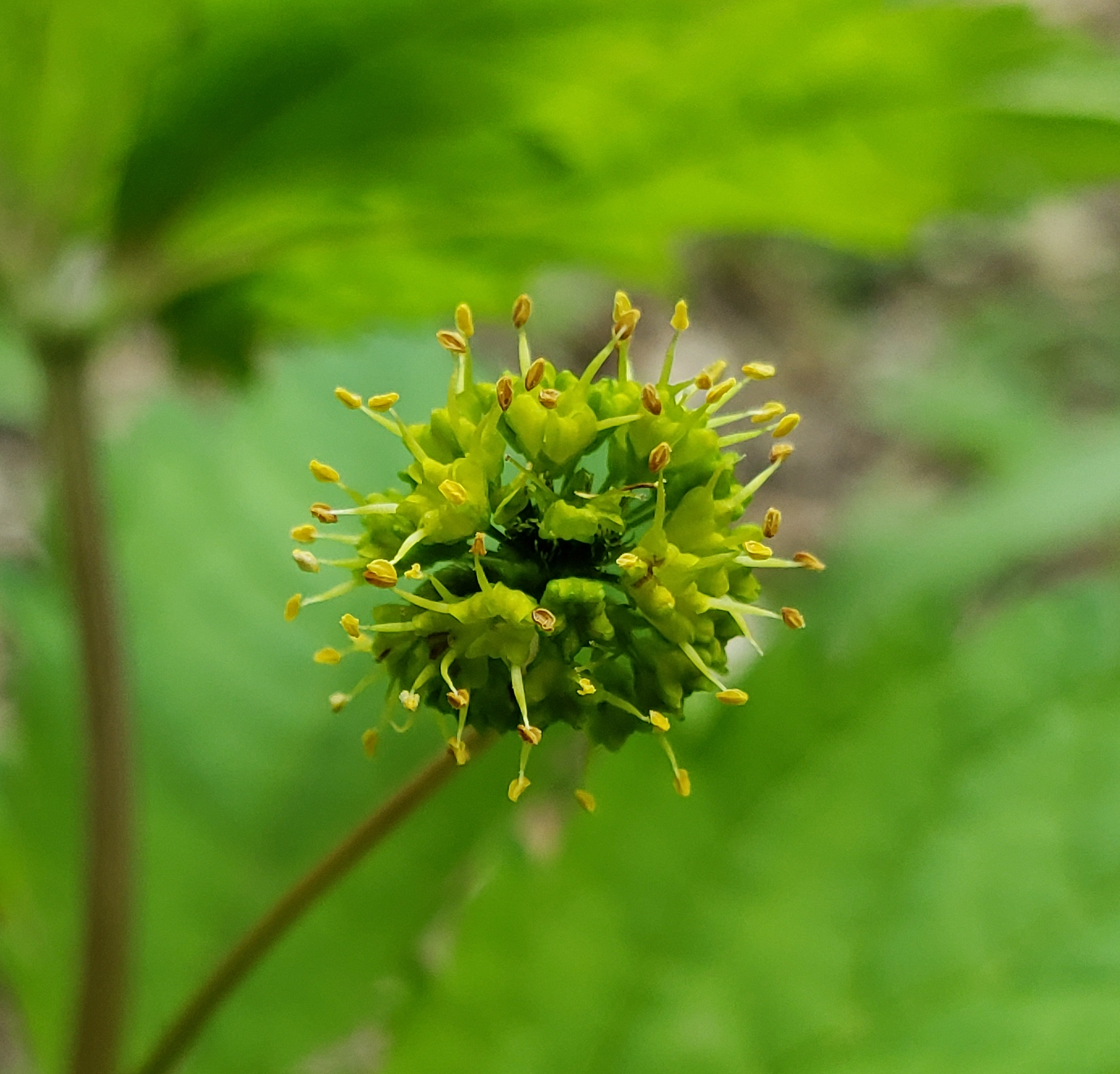
Closeup of its umbellet in bloom.

== Identification ==
Identification of this species from other Sanicula in eastern North America can be difficult. The following combination of features separate it: leaves are divided into 5 (usually) to 7 (occasionally) leaflets; styles are much longer than the calyx; there are up to 12-25 stamens per umbellet; flowers and anthers are yellowish-green, with petals much longer than sepals.
