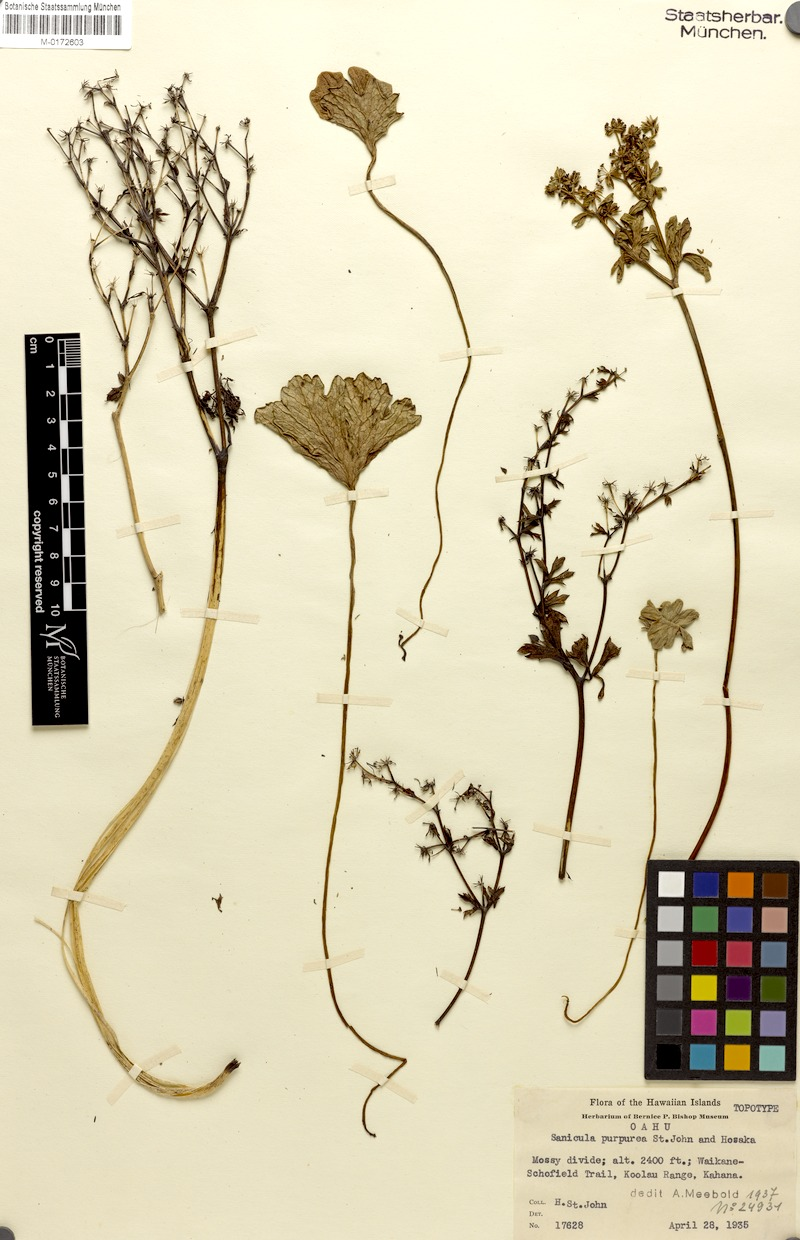

Conservation status
- Critically Imperiled (NatureServe)

Scientific classification
- Kingdom: Plantae
- Clade: Tracheophytes
- Clade: Angiosperms
- Clade: Eudicots
- Clade: Asterids
- Order: Apiales
- Family: Apiaceae
- Genus: Sanicula
- Species: S. purpurea

Binomial name
- Sanicula purpurea H.St.John & Hosaka

= Sanicula purpurea =

Species of flowering plant

Sanicula purpurea is a rare species of flowering plant in the carrot family known by the common names purple-flower black-snakeroot and purple-flowered sanicle. It is endemic to Hawaii, where it is known from Maui and from the Koolau Mountains on the island of Oahu. It is threatened by the degradation of its habitat. It was federally listed as endangered species of the United States in 1996.

This plant has a short, thick stem growing up to about 36 centimeters in maximum height. The leaves have leathery blades measuring up to 8 centimeters long. They are heart-shaped or kidney-shaped and are divided into several large lobes. The inflorescence is a cluster of flowers at the top of the stem. Each cluster has up to three bisexual flowers and up to seven male flowers with nonfunctioning female parts. The flowers have purple petals, making it easy to identify among the sanicles present in Hawaii.

This plant grows in boggy habitat among other plants such as Argyroxiphium grayanum and Oreobolus furcatus.

By 1996 there was only one population remaining on Oahu, and possibly another, but the latter had not been seen in years. On Maui there were three populations. The total global population of the plant was estimated to be no more than 210 individuals.

Threats to the species include damage to the habitat by feral pigs and the presence of the non-native narrow-leaved carpetgrass (Axonopus fissifolius).
