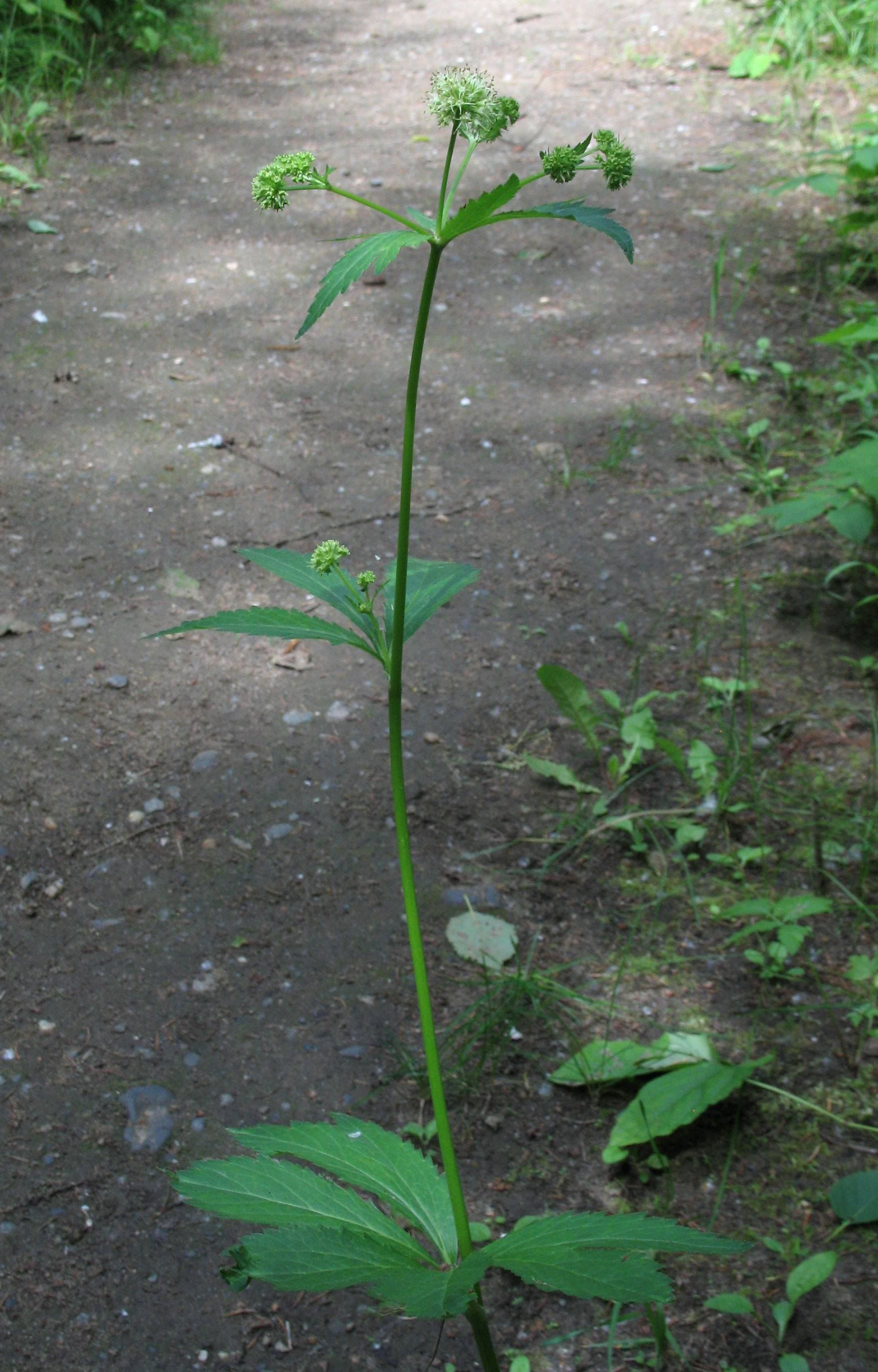

Conservation status
- Secure (NatureServe)

Scientific classification
- Kingdom: Plantae
- Clade: Tracheophytes
- Clade: Angiosperms
- Clade: Eudicots
- Clade: Asterids
- Order: Apiales
- Family: Apiaceae
- Genus: Sanicula
- Species: S. marilandica

Binomial name
- Sanicula marilandica L.

= Sanicula marilandica =

Species of flowering plant

Sanicula marilandica, the Maryland sanicle or Maryland black snakeroot, is a flowering plant widespread in North America but rare along the Pacific coast of the continent and Texas. Sanicula marilandica is listed as Sensitive in Washington state.

Leaves with deeply incised lobes radiating out from the same point. Every leaf has no set number of leaflets, but commonly will have 5–7. The plant is not tall, but the fruiting stalk will rise up to 2 feet, bearing tiny green flowers in the spring. In the fall, the fruit stalk carries dehiscent fruit which splits, bearing small spines.
