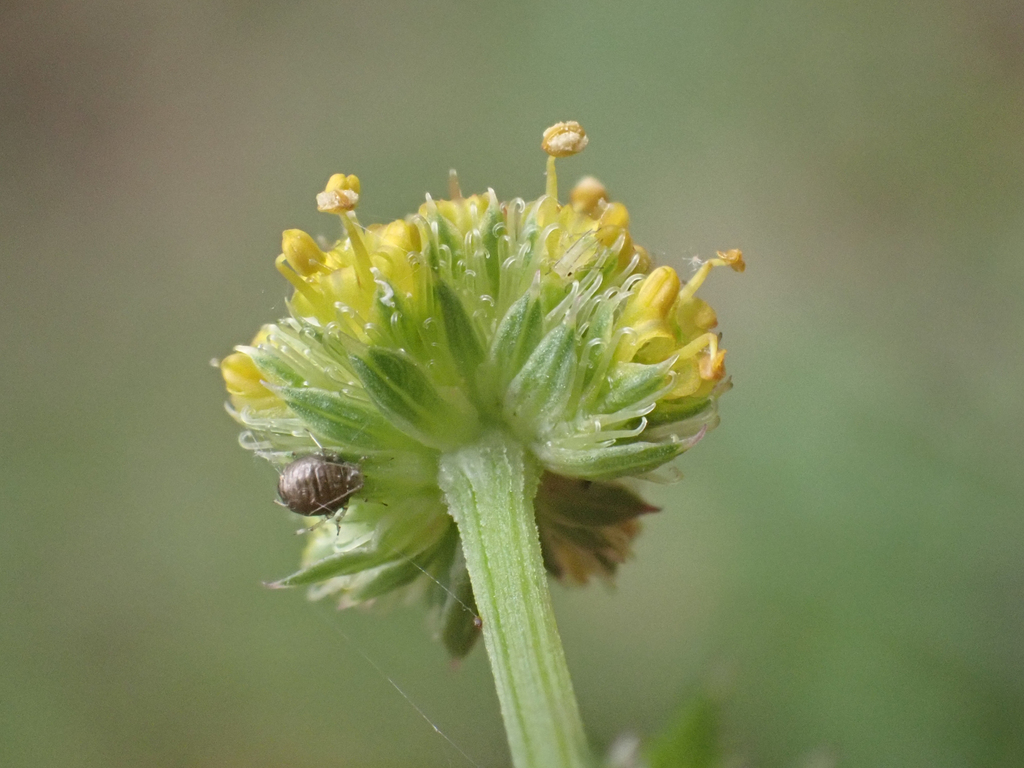

Scientific classification
- Kingdom: Plantae
- Clade: Tracheophytes
- Clade: Angiosperms
- Clade: Eudicots
- Clade: Asterids
- Order: Apiales
- Family: Apiaceae
- Genus: Sanicula
- Species: S. hoffmannii

Binomial name
- Sanicula hoffmannii (Munz) Shan & Constance

= Sanicula hoffmannii =

Species of flowering plant

Sanicula hoffmannii is an uncommon species of flowering plant in the family Apiaceae known by the common names Hoffmann's blacksnakeroot and Hoffmann's sanicle. It is endemic to California, where it is known from the Channel Islands and a few locations in the coastal mountain ranges of the mainland, including the Scott Creek watershed in Santa Cruz County. Its habitat includes coastal hillsides and mountain slopes, sometimes with serpentine soils. It is a perennial herb producing a thick stem up to 90 centimeters tall from a taproot. The green or bluish leaves are compound, the blades each divided into about three lobed, toothed leaflets. The inflorescence is made up of one or more heads of bisexual and male-only flowers with tiny, curving, yellow-green petals.
