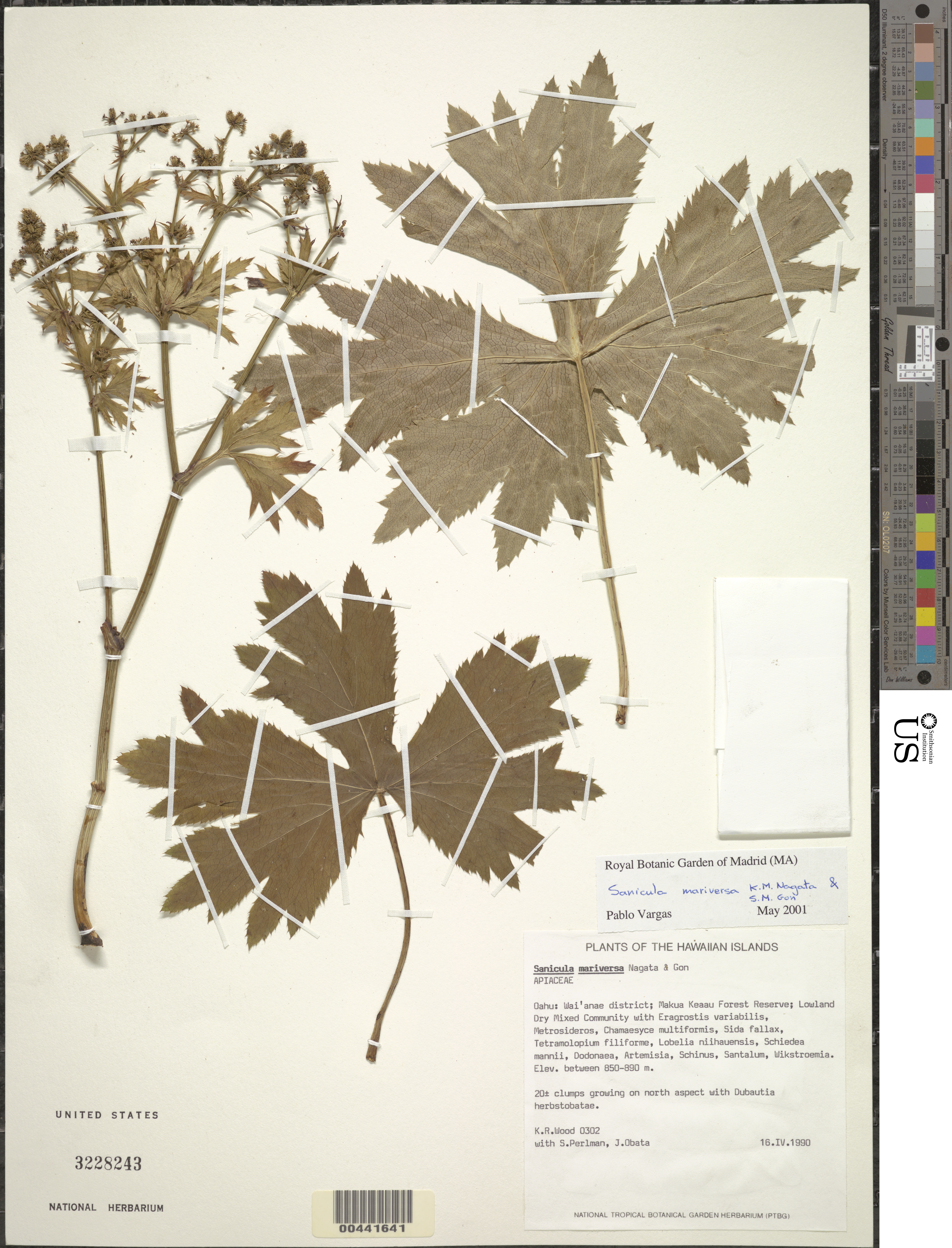

Conservation status
- Critically Imperiled (NatureServe)

Scientific classification
- Kingdom: Plantae
- Clade: Tracheophytes
- Clade: Angiosperms
- Clade: Eudicots
- Clade: Asterids
- Order: Apiales
- Family: Apiaceae
- Genus: Sanicula
- Species: S. mariversa

Binomial name
- Sanicula mariversa Nagata & Gon

= Sanicula mariversa =

Species of flowering plant

Sanicula mariversa is a rare species of flowering plant in the family Apiaceae known by the common name Waianae Range black-snakeroot. It is endemic to Hawaii, where it is known only from the Waianae Mountains on the island of Oahu. It is threatened by the degradation of its habitat. It is a federally listed endangered species of the United States.

This plant produces erect, branching stems 40 to 70 centimeters long from a thick caudex. The leaves have leathery, dark green, heart-shaped or kidney-shaped blades up to 15 centimeters long by 23 wide which are palmately divided into three to five dissected lobes. The inflorescence is a cluster of many tiny yellow flowers, each flower measuring only about a 0.1 centimeter long. The fruit, measuring about half a centimeter long, is covered in hooked prickles. This species is a monocarpic perennial, growing for several years, flowering and fruiting only once, then dying. The plant withers after its growing season each year and remains dormant for the rest of the year, which is probably why it was not officially collected until 1985 nor described to science until 1987. The plant was named for its residence on a ridge overlooking the ocean.

This plant grows on the Makua-Keaau and Kaluaa-Lualualei Summit Ridges of the central Waianae Mountains. The habitat is lower-elevation moist grassland. The plants grow in deep soil and in cracks in steep rock cliffs. The surrounding ground has a layer of mosses and lichens. The area has been invaded by non-native species of grasses including soft chess (Bromus mollis) and annual fescue (Vulpia spp.). Another source of habitat degradation is the mountains' population of feral goats, which scale the slopes, breaking up the soil and causing erosion.

As of 2006 there were 18 mature individuals and 170 immature plants remaining.
