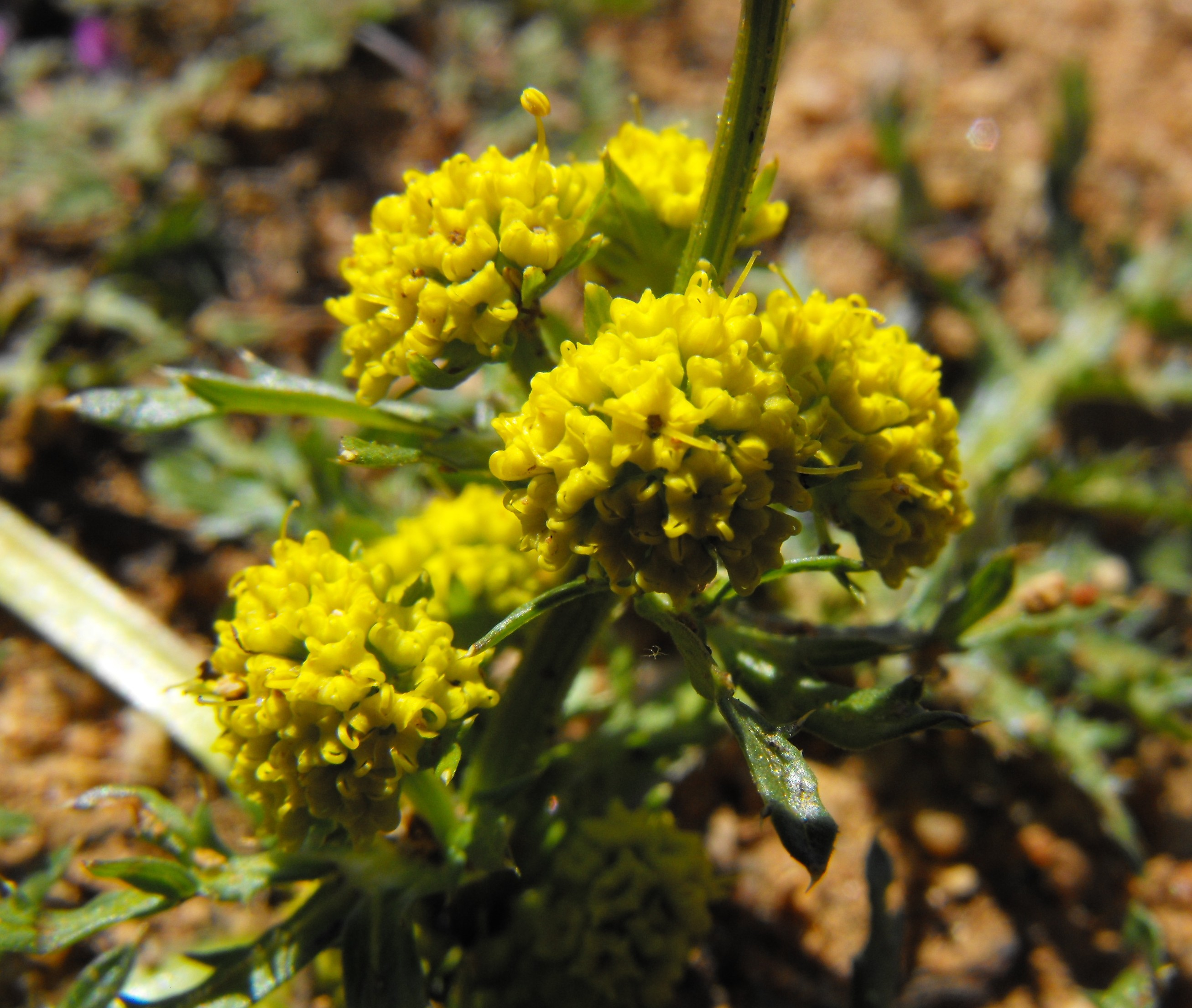

Scientific classification
- Kingdom: Plantae
- Clade: Tracheophytes
- Clade: Angiosperms
- Clade: Eudicots
- Clade: Asterids
- Order: Apiales
- Family: Apiaceae
- Genus: Sanicula
- Species: S. arguta

Binomial name
- Sanicula arguta J.M.Coult. & Rose

= Sanicula arguta =

Species of flowering plant

Sanicula arguta is a species of flowering plant in the family Apiaceae known by the common names sharptooth sanicle and sharptooth blacksnakeroot.

It is native to the coastal hills and mountains of the central coast and southern California and Baja California, the San Francisco Bay Area, and the Channel Islands. It grows in many types of local habitat, including California chaparral and woodlands.

== Description ==
Sanicula arguta is a perennial herb growing from a thick taproot resembling a turnip. The plant is mostly erect, growing up to half a meter tall. The leaves are up to 10 centimeters long and are divided into several sharp-toothed lobes.

The inflorescence is made up of one or more heads of bisexual and male-only flowers with tiny, curving, golden yellow petals. The prickly fruits are about half a centimeter long.
