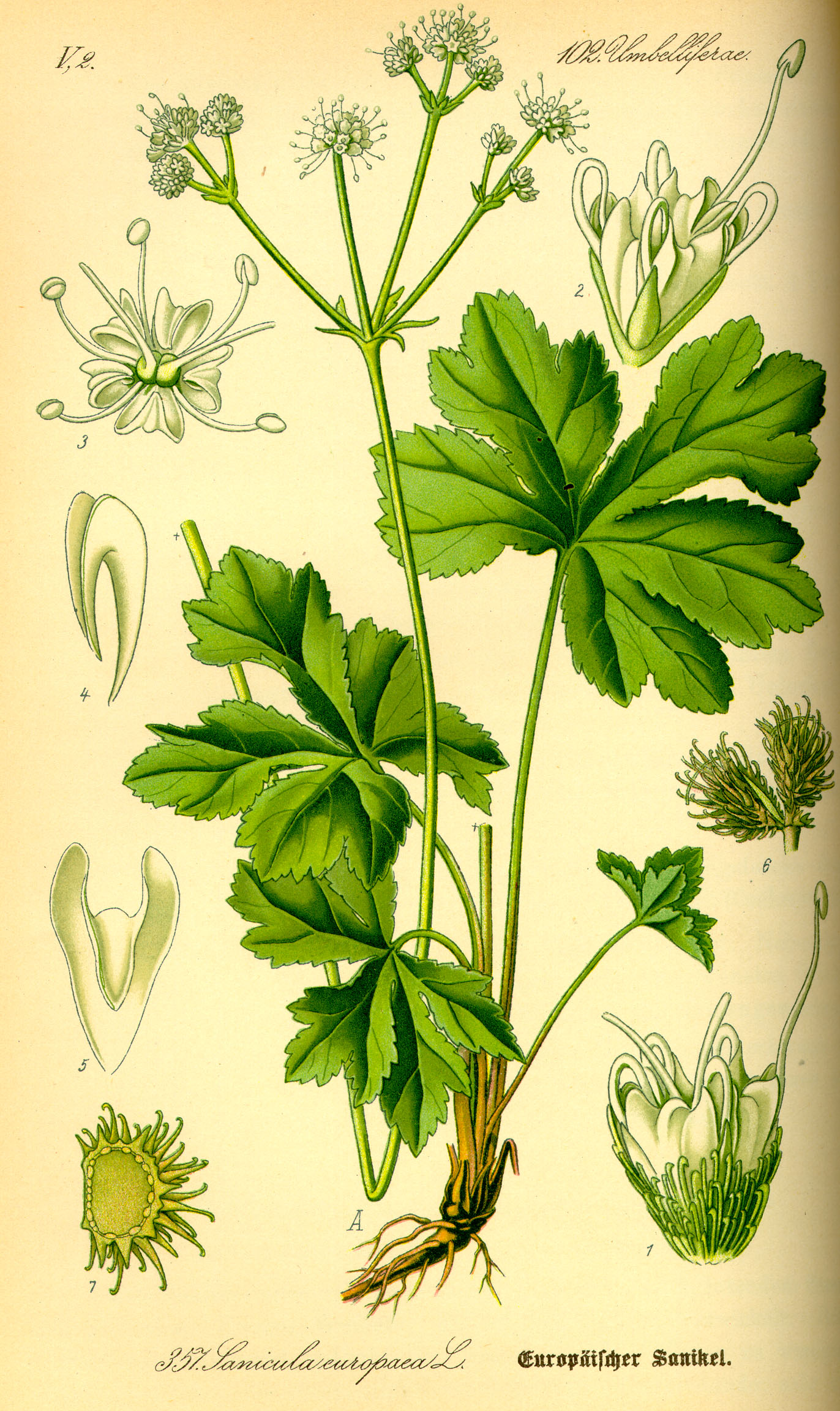
- Sanicula europaea

Scientific classification
- Kingdom: Plantae
- Clade: Tracheophytes
- Clade: Angiosperms
- Clade: Eudicots
- Clade: Asterids
- Order: Apiales
- Family: Apiaceae
- Subfamily: Apioideae
- Tribe: Saniculeae
- Genus: Sanicula; L.

Species
- See text.

Synonyms
- Aulosolena Koso-Pol.; Diapensia Hill, nom. illeg.; Dondia Spreng., nom. illeg.; Dondisia Rchb.; Hacquetia Neck. ex DC.; Hesperogeton Koso-Pol.; Triclinium Raf.

= Sanicula =

Genus of flowering plants

Sanicula is a genus of plants in family Apiaceae (or Umbelliferae), the same family to which the carrot and parsnip belong. This genus has about 45 species worldwide, with at least 22 in North America. The common names usually include the terms sanicle or black snakeroot.

== Etymology ==
Sanicula comes from sanus, Latin for "healthy", reflecting the use of Sanicula europaea in traditional remedies.

== List of species ==
As of December 2022, Plants of the World Online accepted the following species:

- Sanicula arctopoides Hook. & Arn.
- Sanicula arguta Greene ex J.M.Coult. & Rose
- Sanicula astrantiifolia H.Wolff ex Kretschmer
- Sanicula azorica Guthnick ex Seub.
- Sanicula bipinnata Hook. & Arn.
- Sanicula bipinnatifida Douglas
- Sanicula canadensis L.
- Sanicula chinensis Bunge
- Sanicula coerulescens Franch.
- Sanicula crassicaulis Poepp. ex DC.
- Sanicula deserticola C.R.Bell
- Sanicula elata Buch.-Ham. ex D.Don
- Sanicula elongata K.T.Fu
- Sanicula epipactis (Scop.) E.H.L.Krause
- Sanicula europaea L.
- Sanicula fengjiensis J.M.Xu., F.J. Wang & Q. Wang
- Sanicula giraldii H.Wolff
- Sanicula graveolens Poepp. ex DC.
- Sanicula hacquetioides Franch.
- Sanicula hoffmannii (Munz) R.H.Shan & Constance
- Sanicula kaiensis Makino & Hisauti
- Sanicula kauaiensis H.St.John
- Sanicula laciniata Hook. & Arn.
- Sanicula lamelligera Hance
- Sanicula liberta Cham. & Schltdl.
- Sanicula marilandica L.
- Sanicula maritima Kellogg ex S.Watson
- Sanicula mariversa Nagata & S.M.Gon
- Sanicula moranii P.Vargas, Constance & B.G.Baldwin
- Sanicula odorata (Raf.) Pryer & Phillippe
- Sanicula orthacantha S.Moore
- Sanicula oviformis X.T.Liu & Z.Y.Liu
- Sanicula peckiana J.F.Macbr.
- Sanicula purpurea H.St.John & Hosaka
- Sanicula rubriflora F.Schmidt
- Sanicula rugulosa Diels
- Sanicula sandwicensis A.Gray
- Sanicula saxatilis Greene
- Sanicula serrata H.Wolff
- Sanicula smallii E.P.Bicknell
- Sanicula tienmuensis R.H.Shan & Constance
- Sanicula tracyi R.H.Shan & Constance
- Sanicula trifoliata E.P.Bicknell
- Sanicula tuberculata Maxim.
- Sanicula tuberosa Torr.
- Sanicula uralensis Kleopow ex Kamelin, Czubarov & Shmakov
