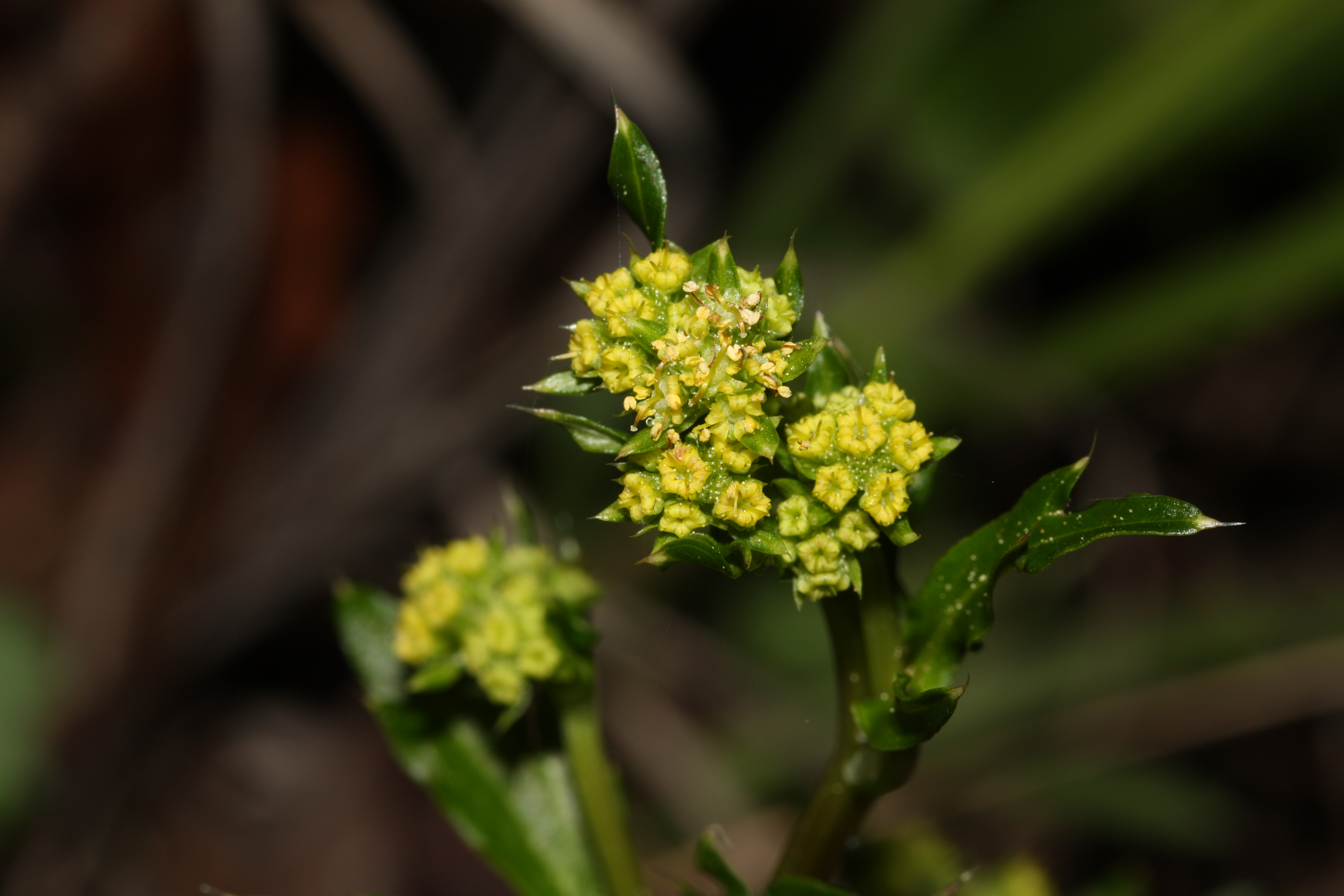
- Sanicula crassicaulis var. tripartita

Conservation status
- Secure (NatureServe)

Scientific classification
- Kingdom: Plantae
- Clade: Tracheophytes
- Clade: Angiosperms
- Clade: Eudicots
- Clade: Asterids
- Order: Apiales
- Family: Apiaceae
- Genus: Sanicula
- Species: S. crassicaulis

Binomial name
- Sanicula crassicaulis Poepp. ex DC.

= Sanicula crassicaulis =

Species of flowering plant

Sanicula crassicaulis is a species of flowering plant in the family Apiaceae known by the common names Pacific black-snakeroot and Pacific sanicle.

== Description ==
It is a perennial herb producing a thick stem up to 1.2 meters tall from a taproot. The leaves have blades up to 13 centimeters long which are divided into a few deep lobes and edged with small teeth. The inflorescence is made up of one or more heads of bisexual and male-only flowers with tiny, curving, yellow petals (var. tripartita flowers may range from yellow, brown, or purple). Each head has approximately five leaflike, lance-shaped bracts at its base. The rounded fruits are a few millimeters long, covered in curving prickles, and borne in small clusters.

== Distribution and habitat ==
Sanicula crassicaulis has an amphitropical distribution and is native to the west coast of North America and southern South America.

In North America, it ranges from British Columbia to Baja California, where it can be found in many types of habitat, including mountain slopes, grassland, and woodlands. In South America, it ranges from Coquimbo Region to Los Lagos Region in Chile, and Chubut Province, Neuquén Province, and Mendoza Province in Argentina. It is also introduced to the Juan Fernández Islands, where it is invasive.

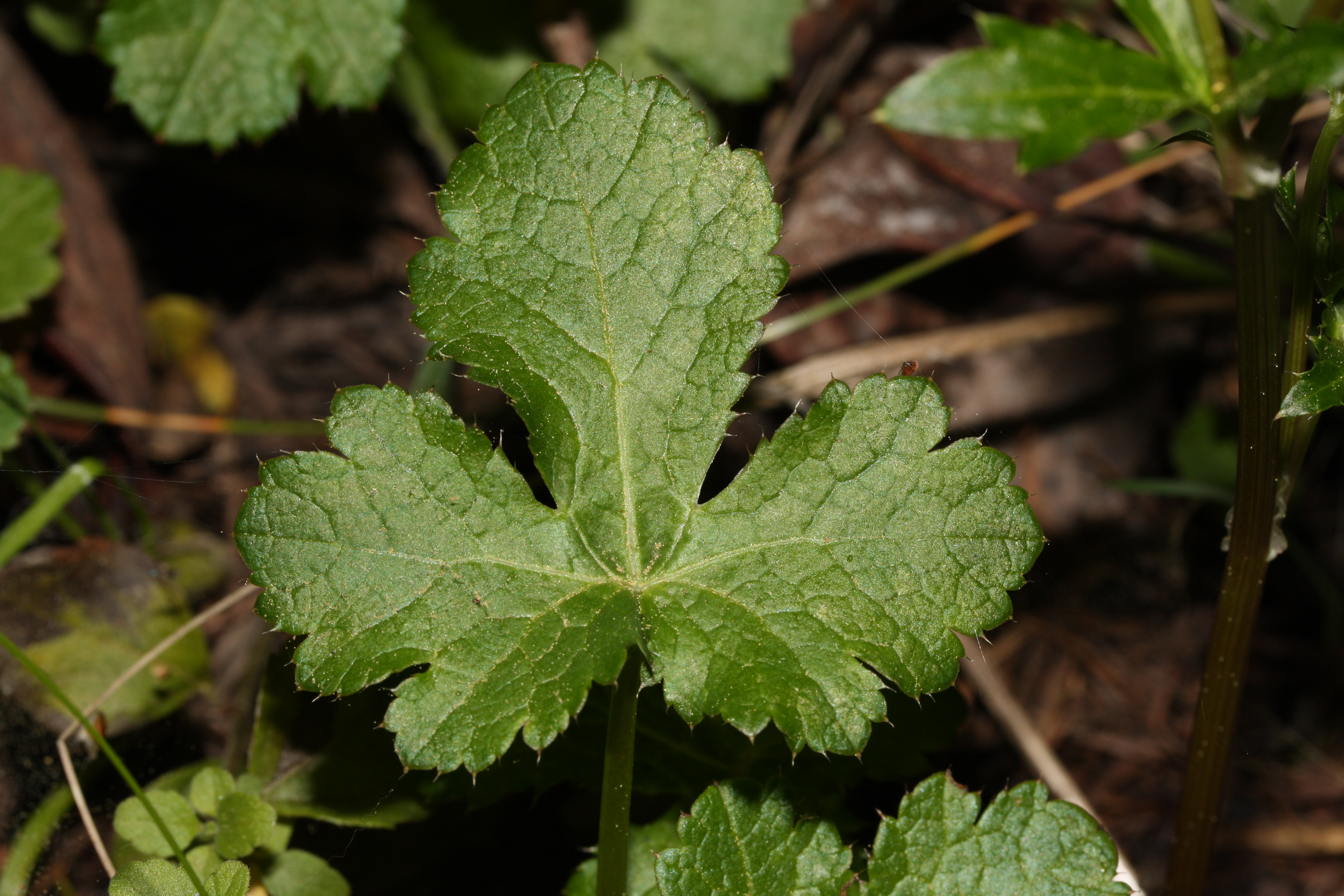
S. crassicaulis var. tripartita leaf closeup, at Washington Park in Anacortes, WA

== Taxonomy ==
There are two varieties:

- Sanicula crassicaulis var. crassicaulis (Poepp. ex. DC.) – Pacific sanicle – British Columbia to California; west of the Cascades and east in the Columbia River Gorge in Washington.
- Sanicula crassicaulis var. tripartita (Suksdorf) H. Wolff – Three-parted Pacific sanicle – southwestern British Columbia to Klickitat County in Washington; west of the Cascades and east in the Columbia River Gorge in Washington.
