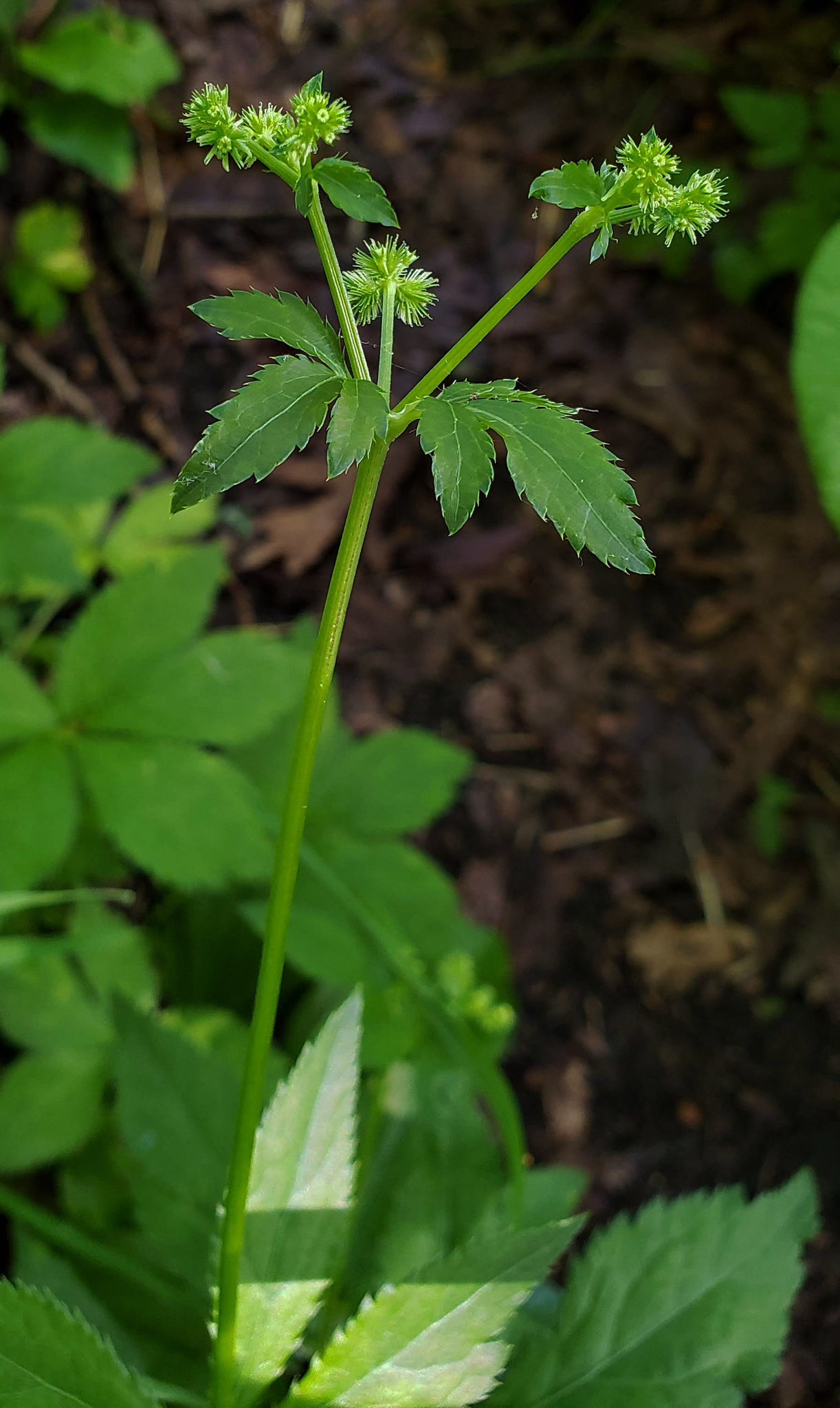

Scientific classification
- Kingdom: Plantae
- Clade: Tracheophytes
- Clade: Angiosperms
- Clade: Eudicots
- Clade: Asterids
- Order: Apiales
- Family: Apiaceae
- Genus: Sanicula
- Species: S. canadensis

Binomial name
- Sanicula canadensis L.

= Sanicula canadensis =

Species of flowering plant

Sanicula canadensis, the Canadian blacksnakeroot, is a native plant of North America and a member of family Apiaceae. It is biennial or perennial, and spreads primarily by seed. It grows from 1 to 4.5 feet tall, and is found in mesic deciduous woodlands. The whitish-green flowers with sepals longer than petals, appearing late spring or early summer and lasting for approximately three weeks, are green and bur-like. The bur-like fruit each split into 2 seeds. The species ranges throughout the eastern United States (excluding Maine), extending north into Quebec and Ontario, and west into Texas and Wyoming.
