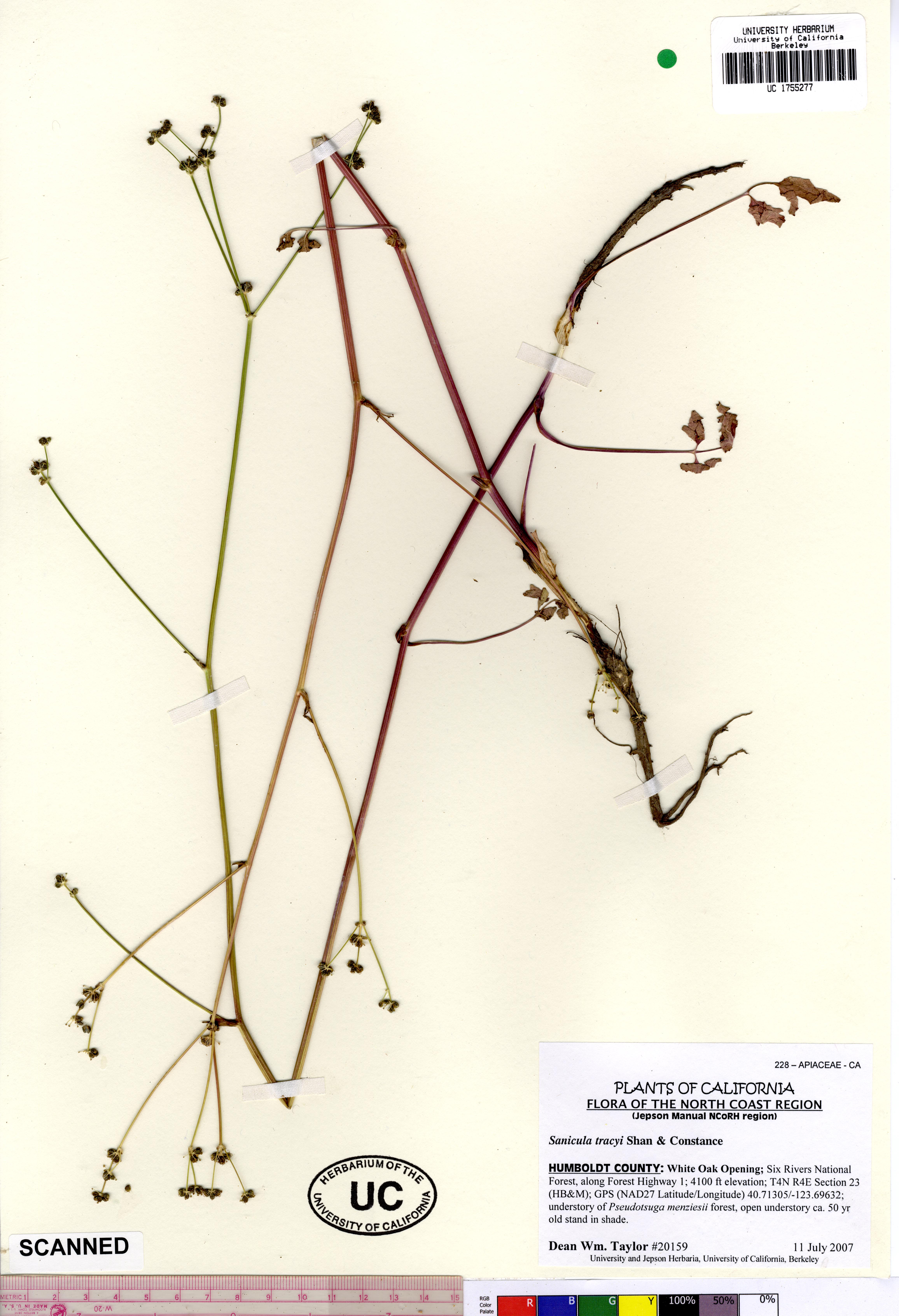
- Sanicula tracyi specimen

Scientific classification
- Kingdom: Plantae
- Clade: Tracheophytes
- Clade: Angiosperms
- Clade: Eudicots
- Clade: Asterids
- Order: Apiales
- Family: Apiaceae
- Genus: Sanicula
- Species: S. tracyi

Binomial name
- Sanicula tracyi Shan & Constance

= Sanicula tracyi =

Species of flowering plant

Sanicula tracyi is a species of flowering plant in the family Apiaceae known by the common names Tracy's blacksnakeroot and Tracy's sanicle. It is endemic to northwestern California, where it is known from woodlands and coniferous forest in hills and mountains. It is a perennial herb producing a slender stem up to about 60 centimeters tall from a taproot. The leaves are compound, divided into usually three leaflets which are deeply cut into lobes and serrated along the edges. The herbage is green to purple in color. The inflorescence is made up of one or more heads of bisexual and male-only flowers with tiny, curving, yellow petals. The fruits are 2 or 3 millimeters long, each fruit covered in bumpy tubercles and sometimes with prickles near the tip.
