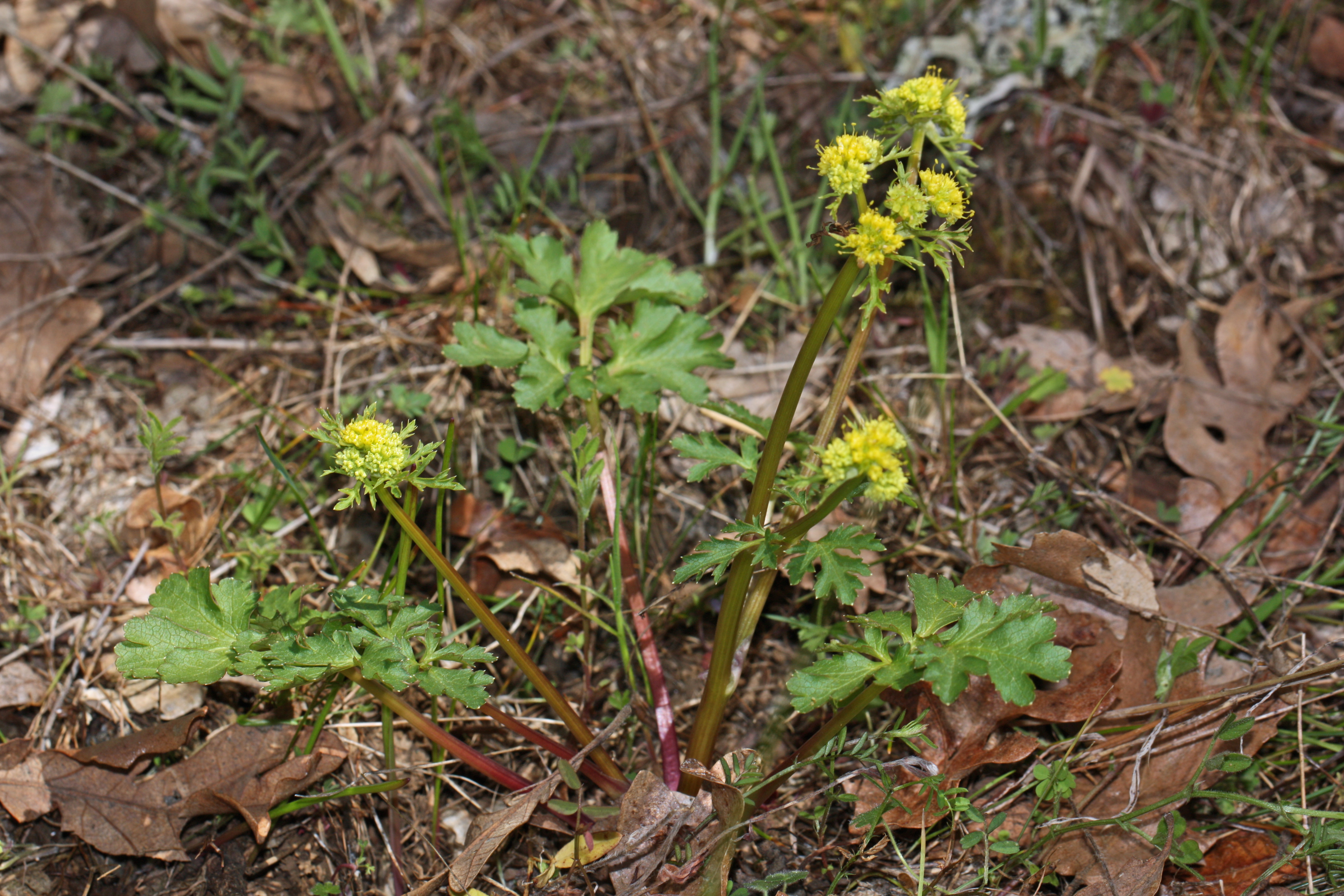

Scientific classification
- Kingdom: Plantae
- Clade: Tracheophytes
- Clade: Angiosperms
- Clade: Eudicots
- Clade: Asterids
- Order: Apiales
- Family: Apiaceae
- Genus: Sanicula
- Species: S. graveolens

Binomial name
- Sanicula graveolens Poepp. ex DC.

= Sanicula graveolens =

Species of flowering plant

Sanicula graveolens is a species of flowering plant in the family Apiaceae known by the common names northern sanicle and Sierra blacksnakeroot. It is native to western North America from British Columbia to Montana to California, and southern South America, including southern Chile. Its habitat includes mountain slopes, forests, and woodlands on serpentine soils. It is a perennial herb producing a slender, branching stem up to half a meter tall from a taproot, with leaves alternate. The lowest leaves have long stalks and are often attached below ground. The upper leaves are smaller, sparse and often sessile. The leaves are compound, the blades each divided into three deeply lobed, toothed leaflets. The herbage is green to purple-tinged to all purple in color. The inflorescence is made up of one or more heads of bisexual and male-only flowers with tiny, curving, yellow petals. Each head has an array of narrow, toothed bracts at its base. The rounded fruits are a few millimeters long, covered in curving prickles, and borne in small clusters.
