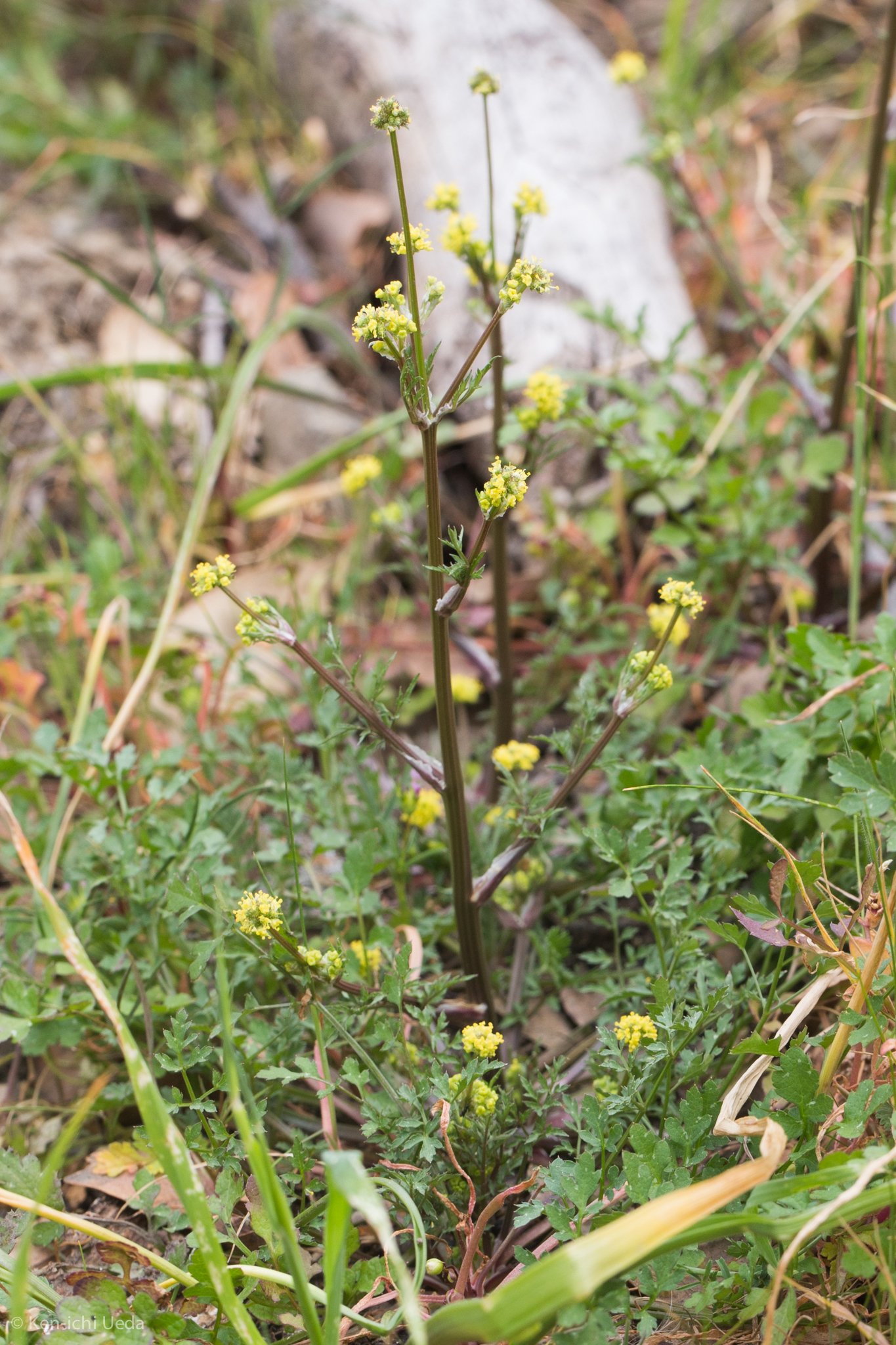

Scientific classification
- Kingdom: Plantae
- Clade: Tracheophytes
- Clade: Angiosperms
- Clade: Eudicots
- Clade: Asterids
- Order: Apiales
- Family: Apiaceae
- Genus: Sanicula
- Species: S. bipinnata

Binomial name
- Sanicula bipinnata Hook. & Arn.

Synonyms
- Sanicula pinnatifida Torr.

= Sanicula bipinnata =

Species of flowering plant

Sanicula bipinnata is a species of plant in the family Apiaceae known by the common name poison sanicle. It is endemic to California where it is found in low-elevation mountains and foothills, especially in the hills along the coast. It occurs in the California Coastal Range and Sierra Nevada foothills, including Ring Mountain, California.

== Description ==
It is recognizable as a relative of the carrots and parsnips with its thin stalk topped with small umbels of yellow or cream flowers. The origin of its poisonous reputation is unknown. Yet despite the name, there are no current records of its toxicity in humans, though it or a related species might be toxic to horses or other stock animals. It was called wene by the Miwok and used to treat venomous bites from snakes, perhaps providing a reason for the common name in English. Though they used other sanicles in the same manner. The Karuk called the plant ikxash and traditionally ate the young leaves as a green, indicating the toxic reputation is undeserved.
