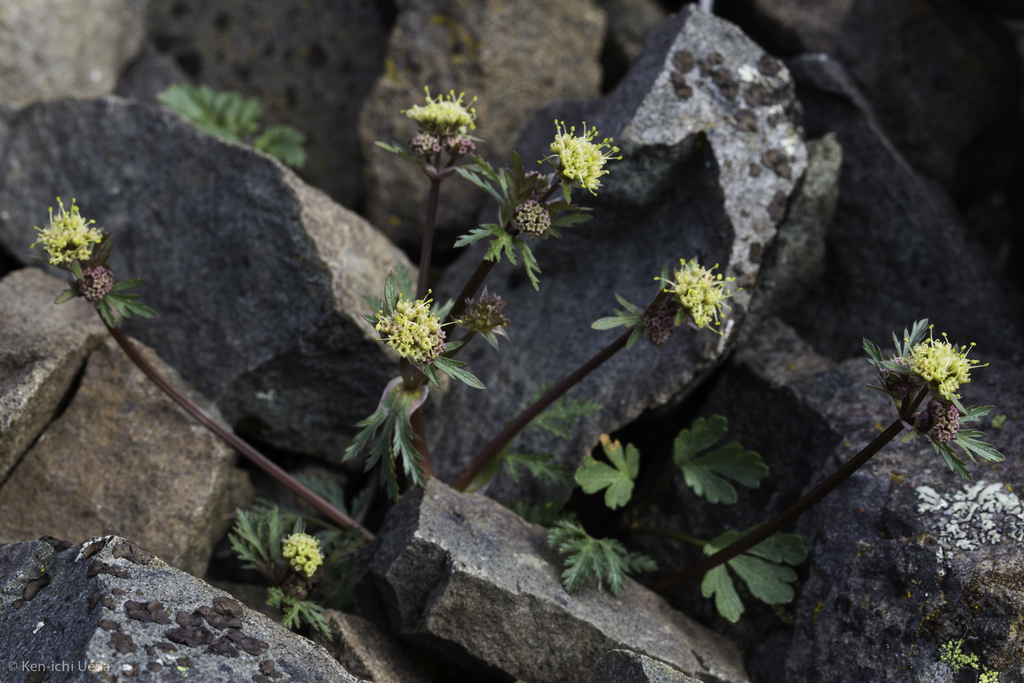

Conservation status
- Imperiled (NatureServe)

Scientific classification
- Kingdom: Plantae
- Clade: Tracheophytes
- Clade: Angiosperms
- Clade: Eudicots
- Clade: Asterids
- Order: Apiales
- Family: Apiaceae
- Genus: Sanicula
- Species: S. saxatilis

Binomial name
- Sanicula saxatilis Greene

= Sanicula saxatilis =

Species of flowering plant

Sanicula saxatilis is a rare species of flowering plant in the parsley family known by the common names devil's blacksnakeroot and rock sanicle.

== Distribution ==
It is endemic to the eastern San Francisco Bay Area of California. It is known only from Mount Diablo and Mount Hamilton, both in the Diablo Range.

Its habitat is mostly rocky chaparral slopes and talus. Although it is rare, most occurrences are in remote mountainous locales that are relatively safe from disturbance.

== Description ==
Sanicula saxatilis is a perennial herb producing a thick stem 10 to 25 centimeters tall from a spherical tuber. The leaves are compound, each divided into three leaflets which are deeply cut into serrated lobes. The foliage is green to purple and sometimes waxy in texture.

The inflorescence is made up of one or more heads of bisexual and male-only flowers with tiny, curving, pale salmon pink, yellowish or straw-colored petals.

The fruits are a few millimeters wide and covered in bumps and sometimes bristles.
