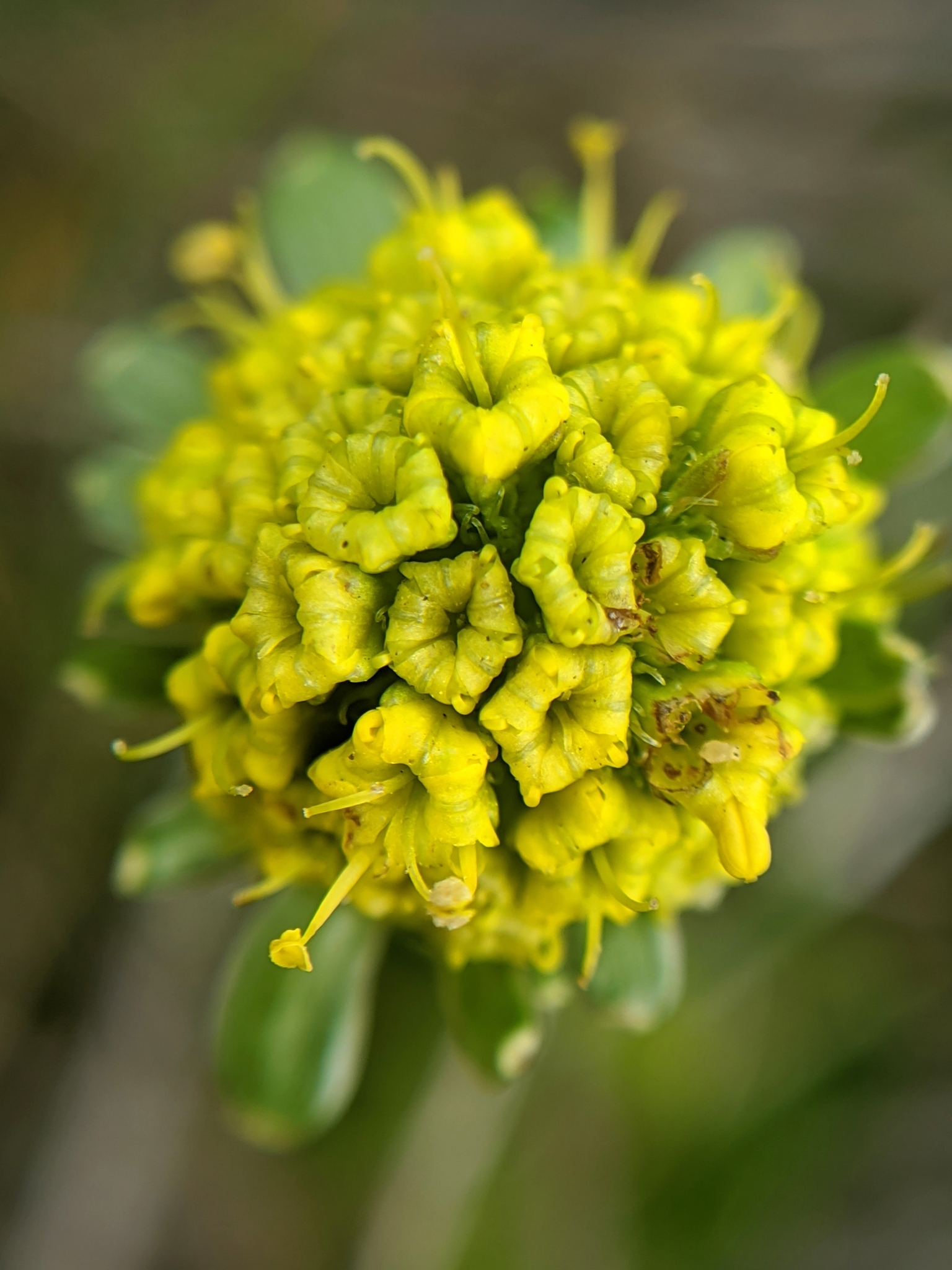

Conservation status
- Critically Imperiled (NatureServe)

Scientific classification
- Kingdom: Plantae
- Clade: Tracheophytes
- Clade: Angiosperms
- Clade: Eudicots
- Clade: Asterids
- Order: Apiales
- Family: Apiaceae
- Genus: Sanicula
- Species: S. maritima

Binomial name
- Sanicula maritima Kellogg ex S.Watson

= Sanicula maritima =

Species of flowering plant

Sanicula maritima is a rare species of flowering plant in the parsley family known by the common names adobe snakeroot and adobe sanicle.

== Distribution ==
The plant is endemic to California, where it is known from just a few occurrences on the Central Coast.

Its habitat includes moist coastal meadows and canyons.

== Description ==
Sanicula maritima is a perennial herb growing to a maximum height near 40 centimeters from a taproot. The green to yellowish leaves are simple or divided into a number of lobes, smooth-edged or toothed.

The inflorescence is made up of one or more heads of bisexual and male-only flowers with tiny, curving, yellow petals.

The prickly fruits are about half a centimeter long each.
