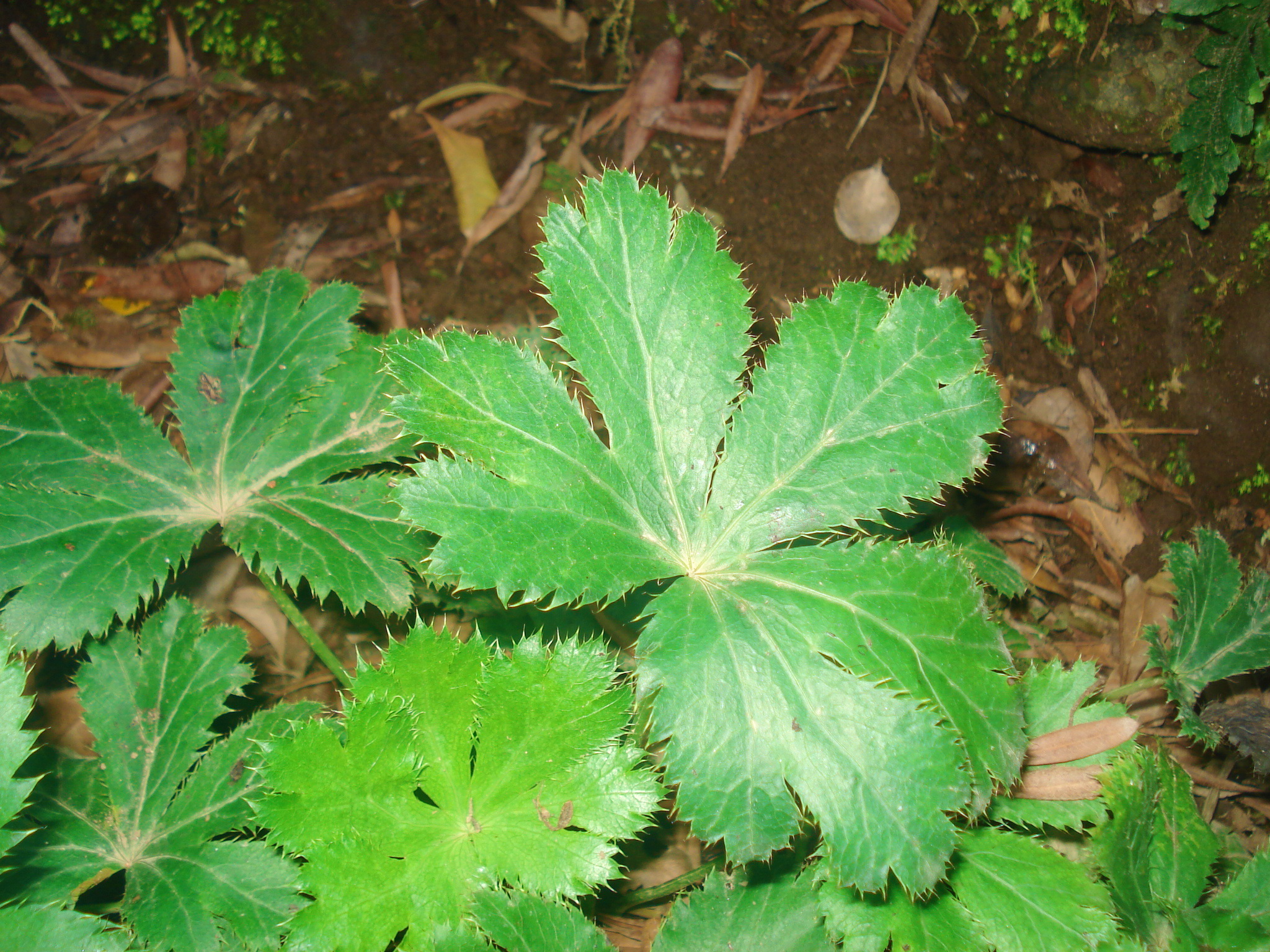
- Sanicula azorica on the Botanical Garden of Faial

Scientific classification
- Kingdom: Plantae
- Clade: Tracheophytes
- Clade: Angiosperms
- Clade: Eudicots
- Clade: Asterids
- Order: Apiales
- Family: Apiaceae
- Genus: Sanicula
- Species: S. azorica

Binomial name
- Sanicula azorica Guthnick ex Seub.

= Sanicula azorica =

Species of flowering plant

Sanicula azorica, the Azores sanicle, (Portuguese: erva-do-capitão) is a perennial plant in the family Apiaceae. It is endemic to the Azores, Portugal.

== Description ==
Sanicula azorica is a perennial plant with strongly cut leaves. It has small bouquets with densely clustered white flowers (usually more than three).

== Distribution and habitat ==
Sanicula azorica is present in six of the nine Azorean islands, specifically in Santa Maria, São Miguel, Terceira, São Jorge, Pico and Faial. It inhabits ravines and natural forests associated with laurisilva, in shady and humid places, usually above 400 m (1,300 ft) in altitude.
