= Black snakeroot =

Black snakeroot may refer to:

- Actaea racemosa/Cimicifuga racemosa, more commonly called black cohosh, an herbaceous perennial plant species native to eastern North America, with medicinal uses
- Certain species in the plant genus Sanicula
