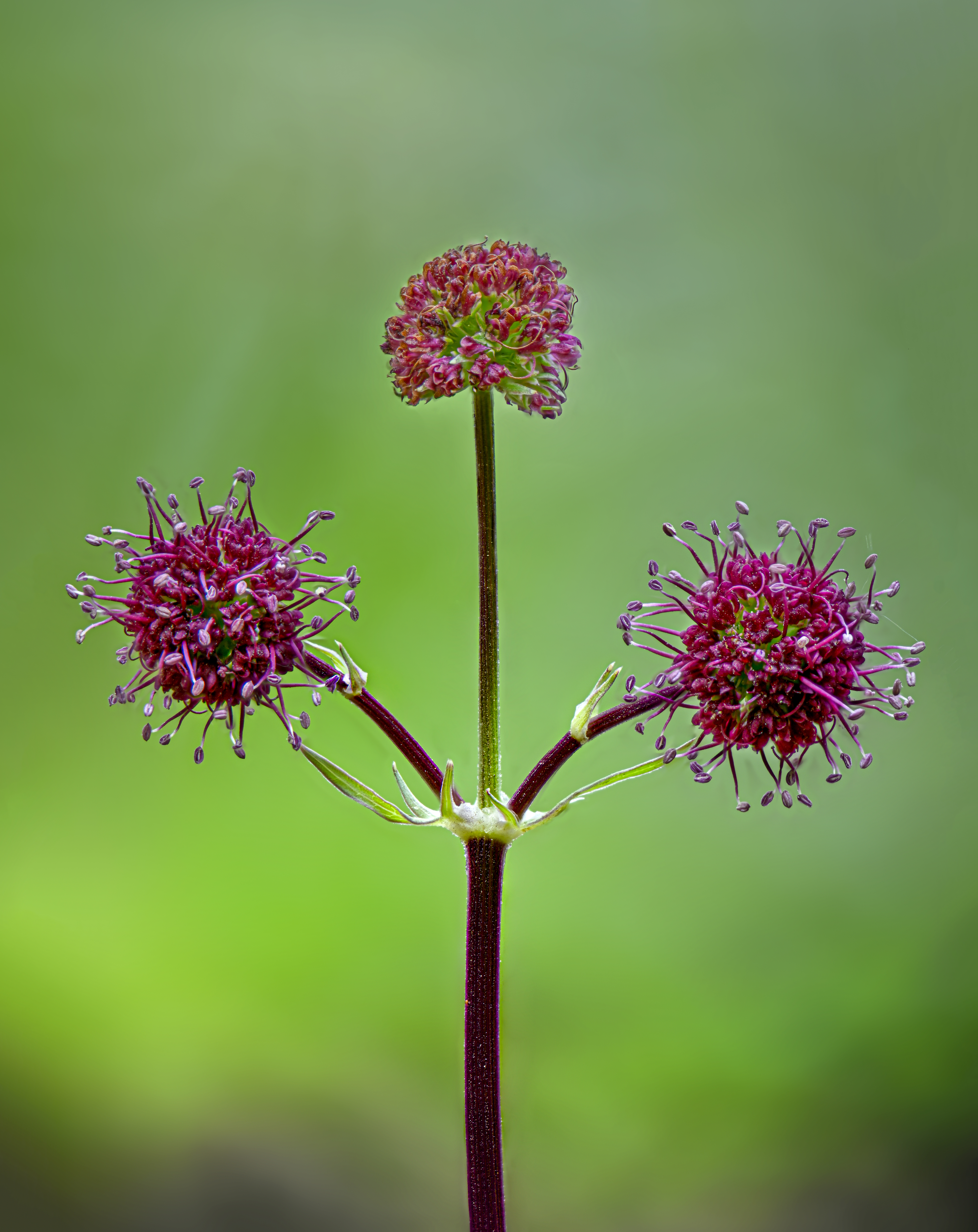

Conservation status
- Secure (NatureServe)

Scientific classification
- Kingdom: Plantae
- Clade: Tracheophytes
- Clade: Angiosperms
- Clade: Eudicots
- Clade: Asterids
- Order: Apiales
- Family: Apiaceae
- Genus: Sanicula
- Species: S. bipinnatifida

Binomial name
- Sanicula bipinnatifida Douglas ex Hook.

= Sanicula bipinnatifida =

Species of flowering plant

Sanicula bipinnatifida is a species of flowering plant in the parsley family known by the common names purple sanicle, purple black-snakeroot, and shoe buttons.

== Description ==
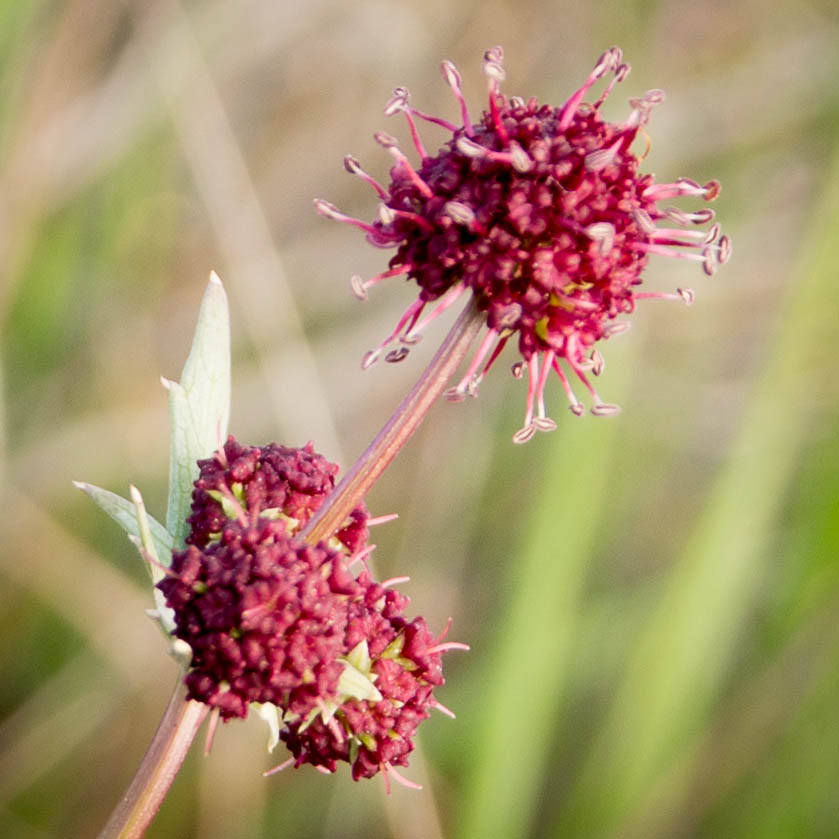
Flower closeup, at Edgewood Preserve in San Mateo County, CA.

It is a perennial herb growing to a maximum height near 60 centimeters from a taproot. It is bright green to dark purple in color. The leaves are borne on long petioles, measuring up to 19 centimeters long with blades divided into several toothed lobes. The inflorescence is made up of one or more heads of bisexual and male-only flowers with tiny, curving, reddish, purple, or yellow petals. The prickly fruits are a few millimeters long.

== Distribution and habitat ==
Sanicula bipinnatifida is native to the west coast of North America from British Columbia to Baja California, where it can be found in many types of habitat, including grassland, woodlands, and mountain slopes of serpentine soils. In Canada, it is a threatened species under the Species At Risk Act, and found only in 20 extant locations on southern Vancouver Island and the surrounding Gulf Islands.
