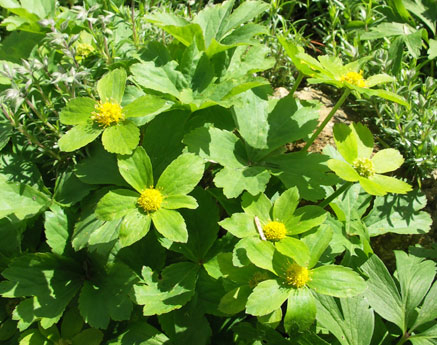

Scientific classification
- Kingdom: Plantae
- Clade: Tracheophytes
- Clade: Angiosperms
- Clade: Eudicots
- Clade: Asterids
- Order: Apiales
- Family: Apiaceae
- Genus: Sanicula
- Species: S. epipactis

Binomial name
- Sanicula epipactis (Scop.) E.H.L.Krause

Synonyms
- Astrantia epipactis Scop.; Dondia epipactis (Scop.) Spreng.; Dondisia epipactis (Scop.) Rchb.; Hacquetia epipactis (Scop.) DC.

= Sanicula epipactis =

Species of flowering plant

Sanicula epipactis (syns Hacquetia epipactis, Dondia epipactis) is a species of flowering plant of the family Apiaceae, native to Europe. Under the synonym Hacquetia epipactis, it was the only species in the monotypic genus Hacquetia.

It grows in moist, shady woodland habitats. It is a rhizomatous, clump-forming herbaceous perennial, growing to about 30 cm in height, with glossy green leaves which only fully develop after flowering. The flowers, appearing late winter and early spring, consist of multiple tiny yellow florets framed by lime green bracts, and carried in dense spherical umbels 4 cm in diameter. It is easy to cultivate in Plant Hardiness Zones 5 to 7 according to the United States Department of Agriculture (though it is hardier than indicated and can be grown easily down to at least Zone 3), and looks best in a woodland setting which imitates its native habitat.

This plant has gained the Royal Horticultural Society's Award of Garden Merit.

Known cultivars include the variegated ‘Thor’.

The specific name epipactis comes from a Greek word for plants thought to curdle milk.
