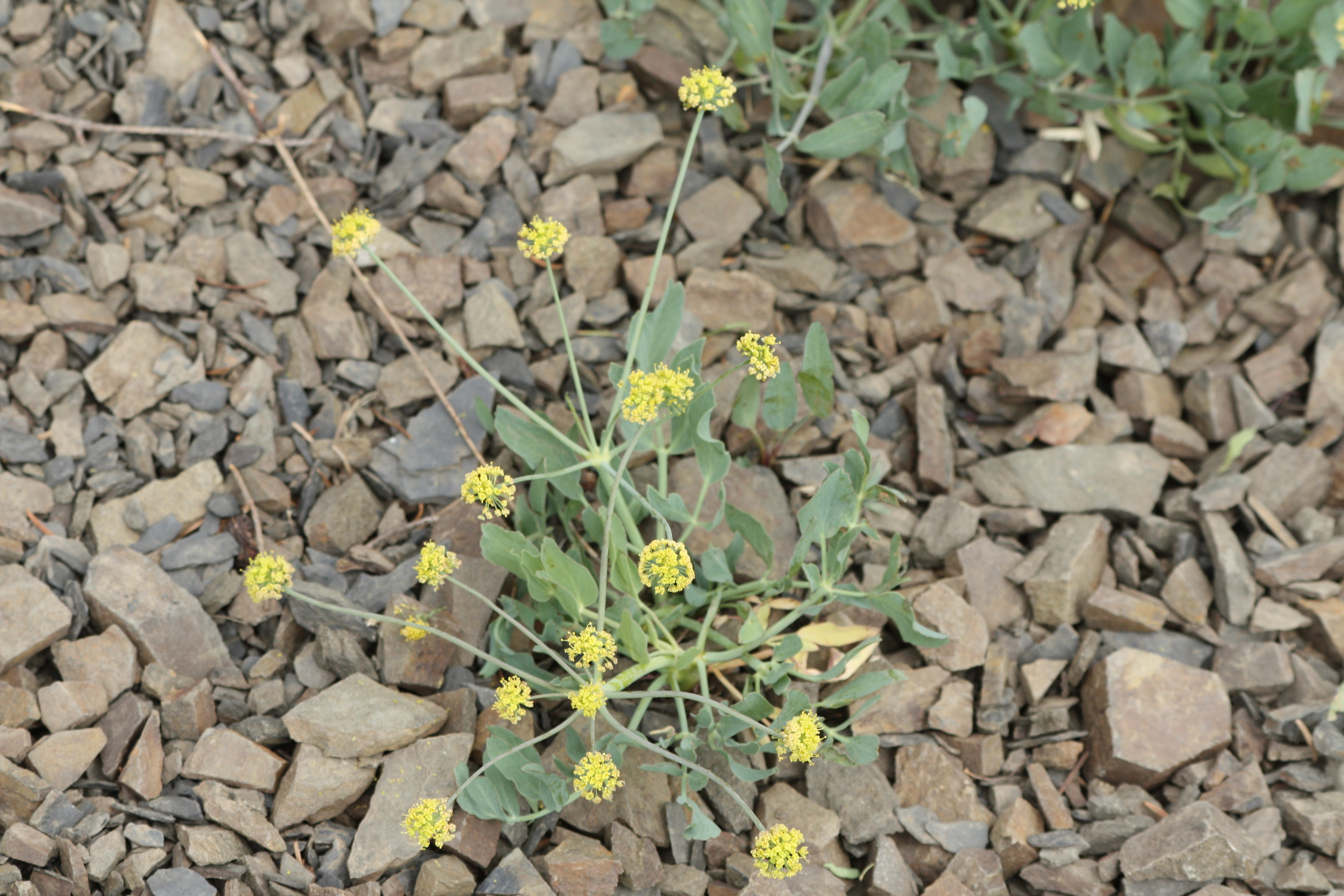

Scientific classification
- Kingdom: Plantae
- Clade: Tracheophytes
- Clade: Angiosperms
- Clade: Eudicots
- Clade: Asterids
- Order: Apiales
- Family: Apiaceae
- Genus: Lomatium
- Species: L. nudicaule

Binomial name
- Lomatium nudicaule (Pursh) J.M.Coult. & Rose

= Lomatium nudicaule =

Species of plant

Lomatium nudicaule is a species of flowering plant in the carrot family known by the common names barestem biscuitroot, pestle lomatium, desert parsley, Indian celery, and Indian consumption plant. It is native to western North America from British Columbia to California to Utah, where it is known from several habitat types, including forest and woodland. It is a perennial herb growing up to about 20–45 centimetres (7.9–18 in) tall from a thick taproot. It generally lacks a stem, the inflorescence and leaves emerging from ground level. Each leaflet is 2 to 5 cm (0.8 to 2 in) long and ovoid to orbicular in outline with coarse teeth near the tip. The inflorescence is borne on a stout, leafless peduncle widening at the top where it blooms in an umbel of yellow flowers.

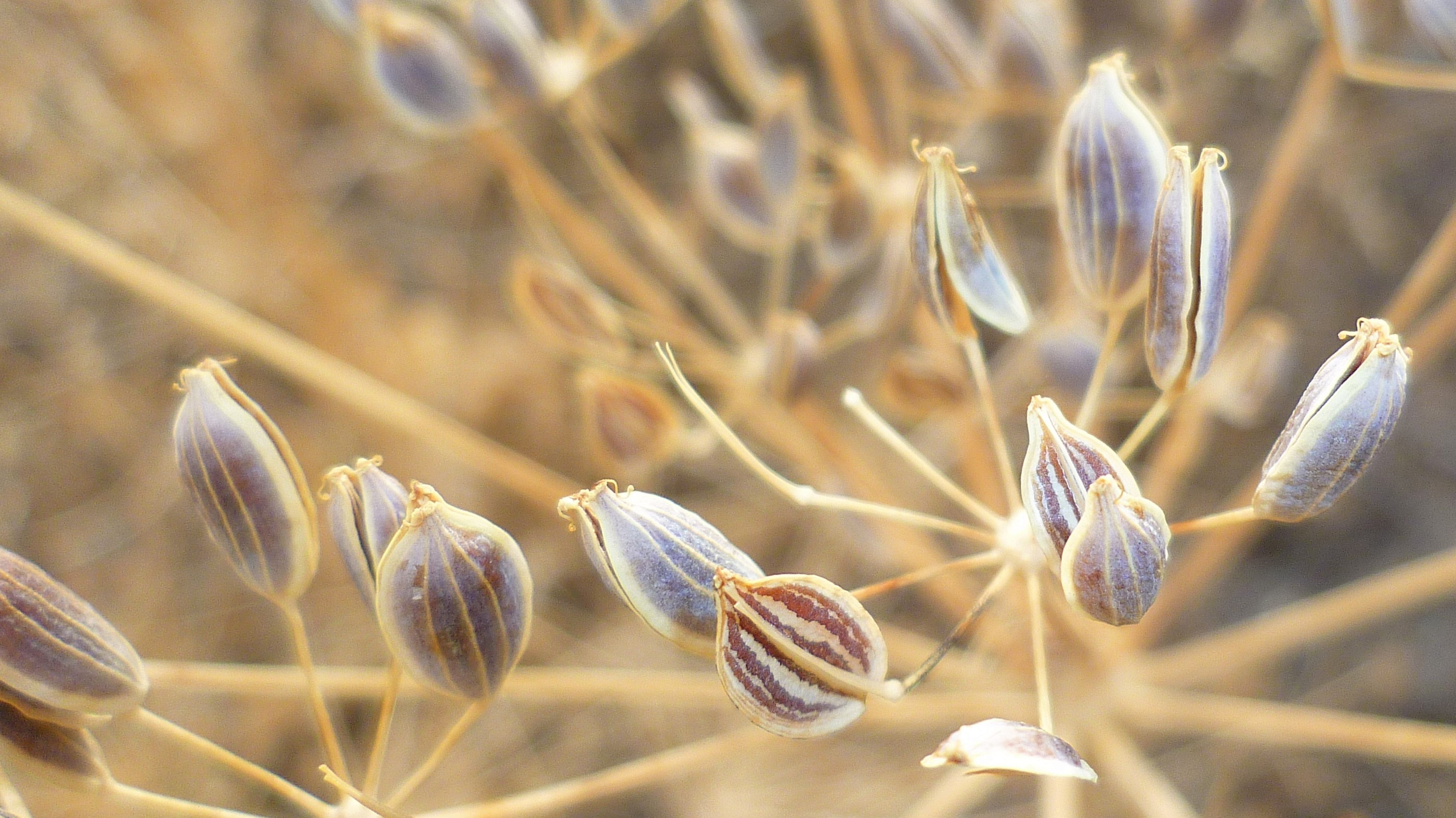
Mature seeds

== Uses ==
This plant is a traditional source of food for many Native American groups, and its parts are used medicinally, including as a treatment for tuberculosis. It also has been used ceremonially in association with the fishing and processing of salmon among peoples of southwestern British Columbia and Washington. For example, the W̱SÁNEĆ (Saanich), who called it ḴEXMIN, burn the seeds in a fire or on a stove when drying the salmon. Among other peoples also, including the Kwakwaka'wakw and Nuu-chah-nulth, the seeds are burned as an incense at funerals and chewed by singers to ease their throats.
