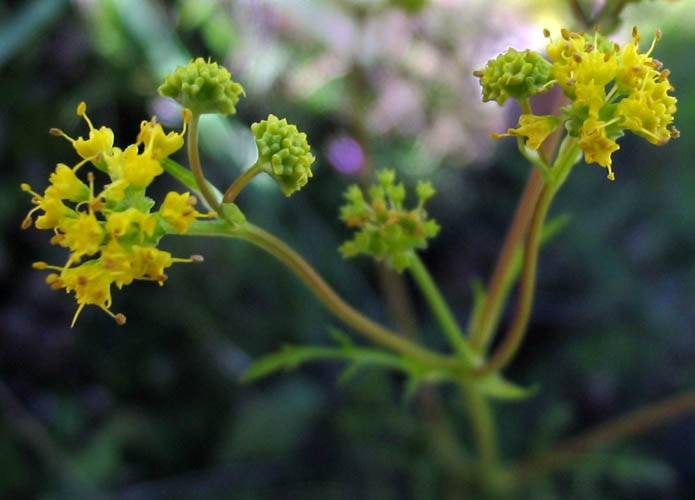

Scientific classification
- Kingdom: Plantae
- Clade: Tracheophytes
- Clade: Angiosperms
- Clade: Eudicots
- Clade: Asterids
- Order: Apiales
- Family: Apiaceae
- Genus: Sanicula
- Species: S. tuberosa

Binomial name
- Sanicula tuberosa Torr.

= Sanicula tuberosa =

Species of flowering plant

Sanicula tuberosa is a species of flowering plant in the parsley family known by the common name turkey pea. It is native to western North America from Oregon through California to Baja California, where it can be found in many types of habitat, including chaparral, forests, and woodlands. It is variable in appearance. In general, it is a perennial herb producing a slender stem up to 80 centimeters long from a small, spherical tuber no more than 2 centimeters wide. The leaves are compound, divided into usually three leaflets which are smooth or deeply cut into lobes. The herbage is green to purple in color. The inflorescence is made up of one or more heads of bisexual and male-only flowers with tiny, curving, yellow petals. The fruits are 1 or 2 millimeters long and covered in bumpy tubercles.
