= Hacquetia (fish) =

Hacquetia Temporal range: Early Eocene

Scientific classification
- Kingdom: Animalia
- Phylum: Chordata
- Class: Actinopterygii
- Division: Teleostei
- Genus: †Hacquetia; Szajnocha, 1886
- Species: †H. bolcensis

Binomial name
- †Hacquetia bolcensis Szajnocha, 1886

Extinct genus of fishes

Hacquetia is an dubious genus of extinct prehistoric bony fish known from the early Eocene. It contains a single species, H. bolcensis, known from the Monte Bolca site of Italy. It is known from an imperfect skeleton of poor preservation. It was initially described as a potential fistulariid, but Sepkoski (2003) considered it a clupeiform. Woodward (1901) treated it as a ray-finned fish of uncertain affinities. It is not included in more recent checklists of the Bolca fauna.
