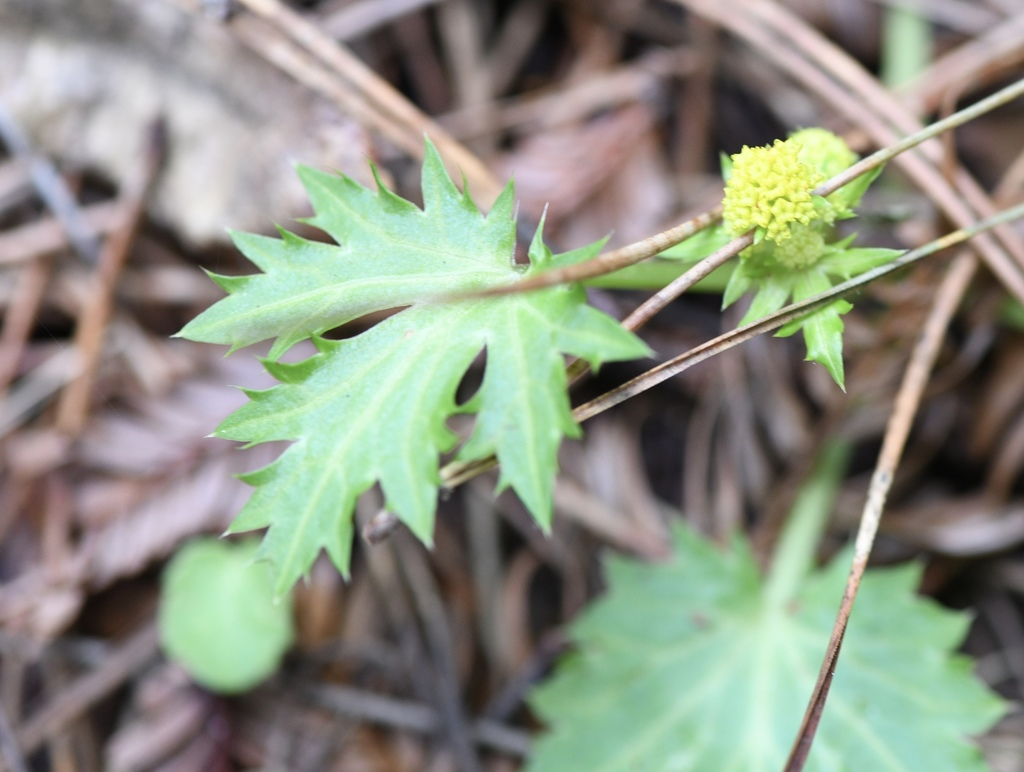

Scientific classification
- Kingdom: Plantae
- Clade: Tracheophytes
- Clade: Angiosperms
- Clade: Eudicots
- Clade: Asterids
- Order: Apiales
- Family: Apiaceae
- Genus: Sanicula
- Species: S. laciniata

Binomial name
- Sanicula laciniata Hook. & Arn.

= Sanicula laciniata =

Species of flowering plant

Sanicula laciniata is a flowering plant species of in the family Apiaceae. Common names include coastal blacksnakeroot, laceleaf sanicle, and coast sanicle.

== Distribution and ecology ==
The species is distributed along the Central and North Coast Ranges of California, extending into southern Oregon. A typical occurrence is on Ring Mountain in Marin County, California, where it occurs in association with the poison sanicle, Pacific sanicle and numerous other forbs.
