= Spermolepis inermis =

Scientific classification
- Kingdom: Plantae
- Clade: Tracheophytes
- Clade: Angiosperms
- Clade: Eudicots
- Clade: Asterids
- Order: Apiales
- Family: Apiaceae
- Genus: Spermolepis
- Species: S. inermis

Binomial name
- Spermolepis inermis (Nutt. ex DC.) Mathias & Constance

Synonyms
- Apiastrum patens (Nutt. ex DC.) J.M.Coult. & Rose; Apium patens (Nutt. ex DC.) S.Watson; Leptocaulis inermis Nutt. ex DC.; Leptocaulis patens Nutt. ex DC.; Spermolepis patens (Nutt. ex DC.) B.L.Rob.; Spermolepis patens var. inermis (Nutt. ex DC.) Mathias

Species of plant

Spermolepis inermis, the Red River scaleseed or spreading scaleseed, is a species of flowering plant in the family Apiaceae. It is native to the central and southeastern United States, and eastern Mexico. An annual reaching 3 ft (1 m), it is found in grasslands.
