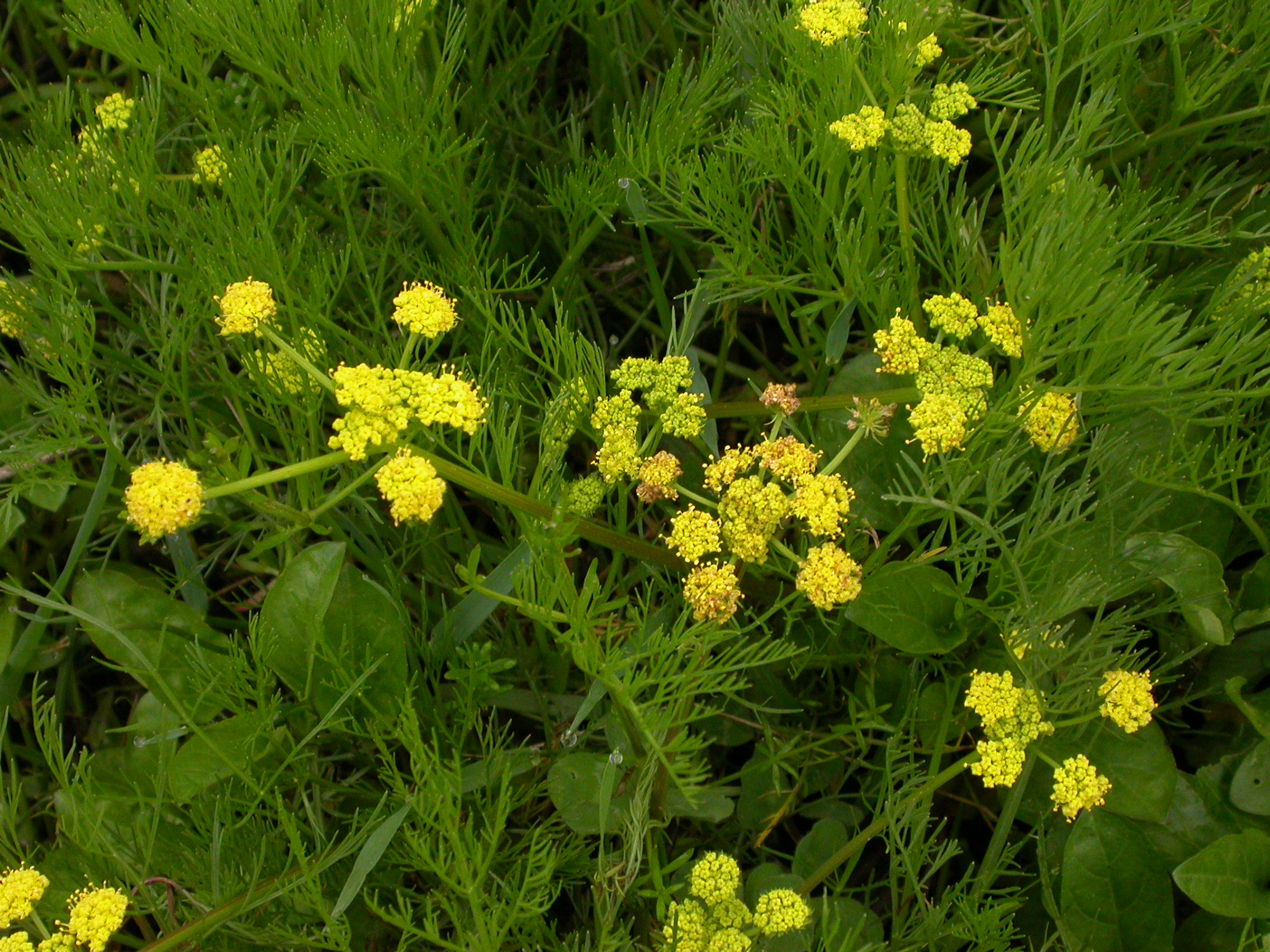

Scientific classification
- Kingdom: Plantae
- Clade: Tracheophytes
- Clade: Angiosperms
- Clade: Eudicots
- Clade: Asterids
- Order: Apiales
- Family: Apiaceae
- Genus: Lomatium
- Species: L. bradshawii

Binomial name
- Lomatium bradshawii (Rose ex Math.) Math. & Const. 1942

Synonyms
- Leptotaenia bradshawii Rose ex Mathias 1934

= Lomatium bradshawii =

Species of flowering plant

Lomatium bradshawii, also known as Bradshaw's desert parsley, is a perennial herb, native to Oregon and Washington.

Lomatium bradshawii was thought to be extinct until 1979, when it was rediscovered by a University of Oregon graduate. Due to conservation efforts, in 2021, the U.S. Fish and Wildlife Service removed the plant from the Federal List of Endangered and Threatened Plants.

This herb was common in the Willamette Valley before agricultural development and fire prevention which has allowed shrubs and weeds to invade. Most known populations of Lomatium bradshawii are within ten miles of Eugene, Oregon. In the Willamette Valley, populations exist in the Oregon counties Lane, Benton, Linn, and Marion, and in Washington Lomatium bradshawii grows in Puget Sound. The largest population of this herb was in Camas Meadows, Washington, with a population of 10,7900,00 +/- 2,010,000 until it was plowed in October 2024, and the Berry Botanic Garden keeps a seedbank.

Lomatium bradshawii grows in low elevations along rivers or in regularly flooded prairies. Yellow inflorescences of Lomatium bradshawii occur from April to May.
