= Cotopaxia =

Scientific classification
- Kingdom: Plantae
- Clade: Tracheophytes
- Clade: Angiosperms
- Clade: Eudicots
- Clade: Asterids
- Order: Apiales
- Family: Apiaceae
- Subfamily: Apioideae
- Tribe: Selineae
- Genus: Cotopaxia; Mathias & Constance

Genus of flowering plants

Cotopaxia is a genus of flowering plant in the family Apiaceae, comprising two species.

Species

- Cotopaxia asplundii Mathias & Constance
- Cotopaxia whitei Constance & W.S.Alverson
