= Manhattan Beach Botanical Garden =

Botanical garden at Polliwog Park in Manhattan Beach, California

Coordinates: 33.8885°N 118.3871°W

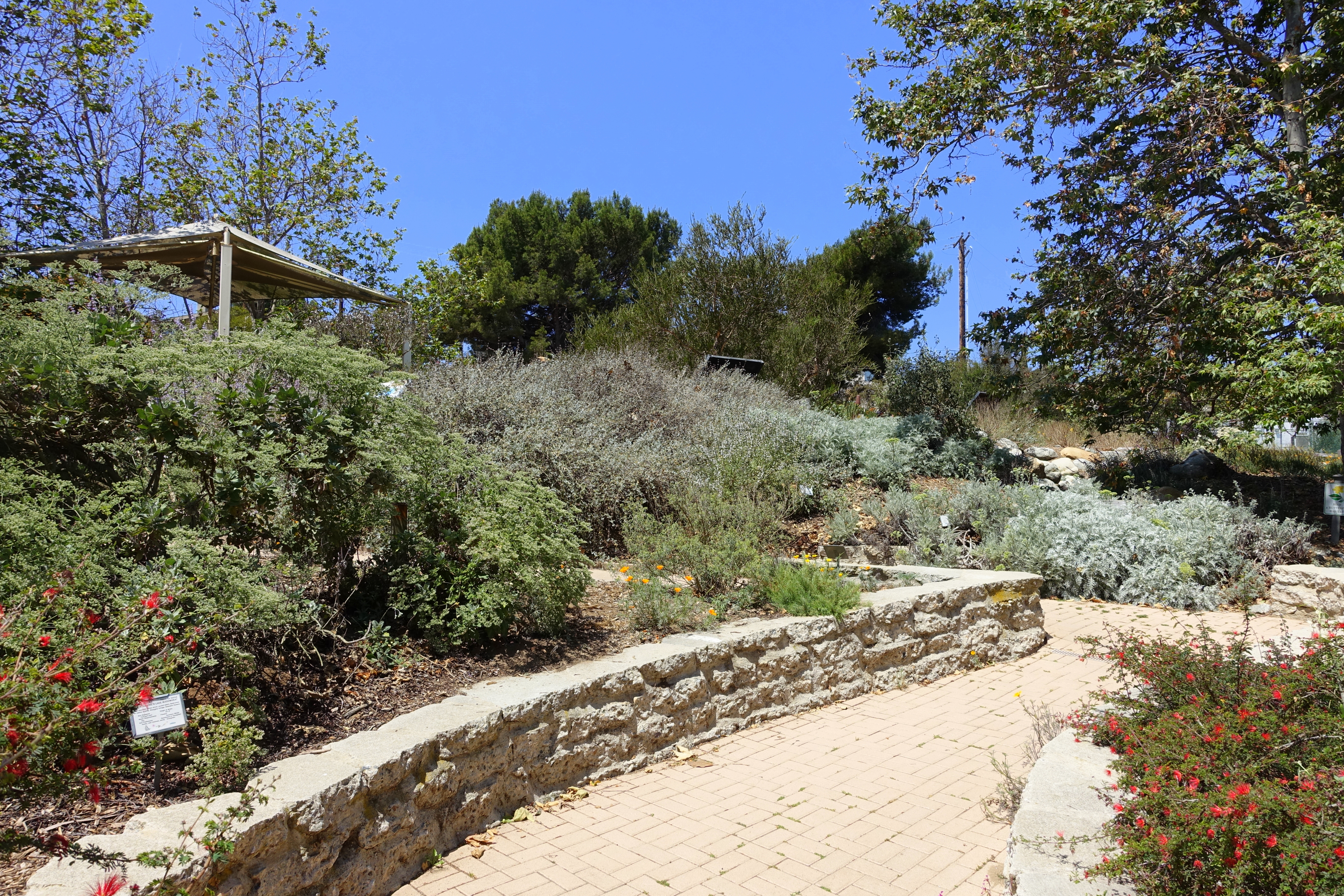
- Interactive map of Manhattan Beach Botanical Garden
- Type: Botanical garden
- Location: Manhattan Beach, California, U.S

The Manhattan Beach Botanical Garden (.66 acres (0.27 ha)) is a botanical garden located within Polliwog Park in Manhattan Beach, California. It is open daily with free admission. The garden was first envisioned in 1992, with garden construction starting in 1994. In 1997 the garden became a nonprofit organization, and its grand opening was on Earth Day 2001. It consists primarily of plants native to California.

== See also ==
- South Coast Botanic Garden
- Santa Barbara Botanic Garden
- California Botanic Garden
- Mildred E. Mathias Botanical Garden
