= Mildred E. Mathias Botanical Garden =

Botanical garden in Los Angeles, California

Mathias Botanical Garden
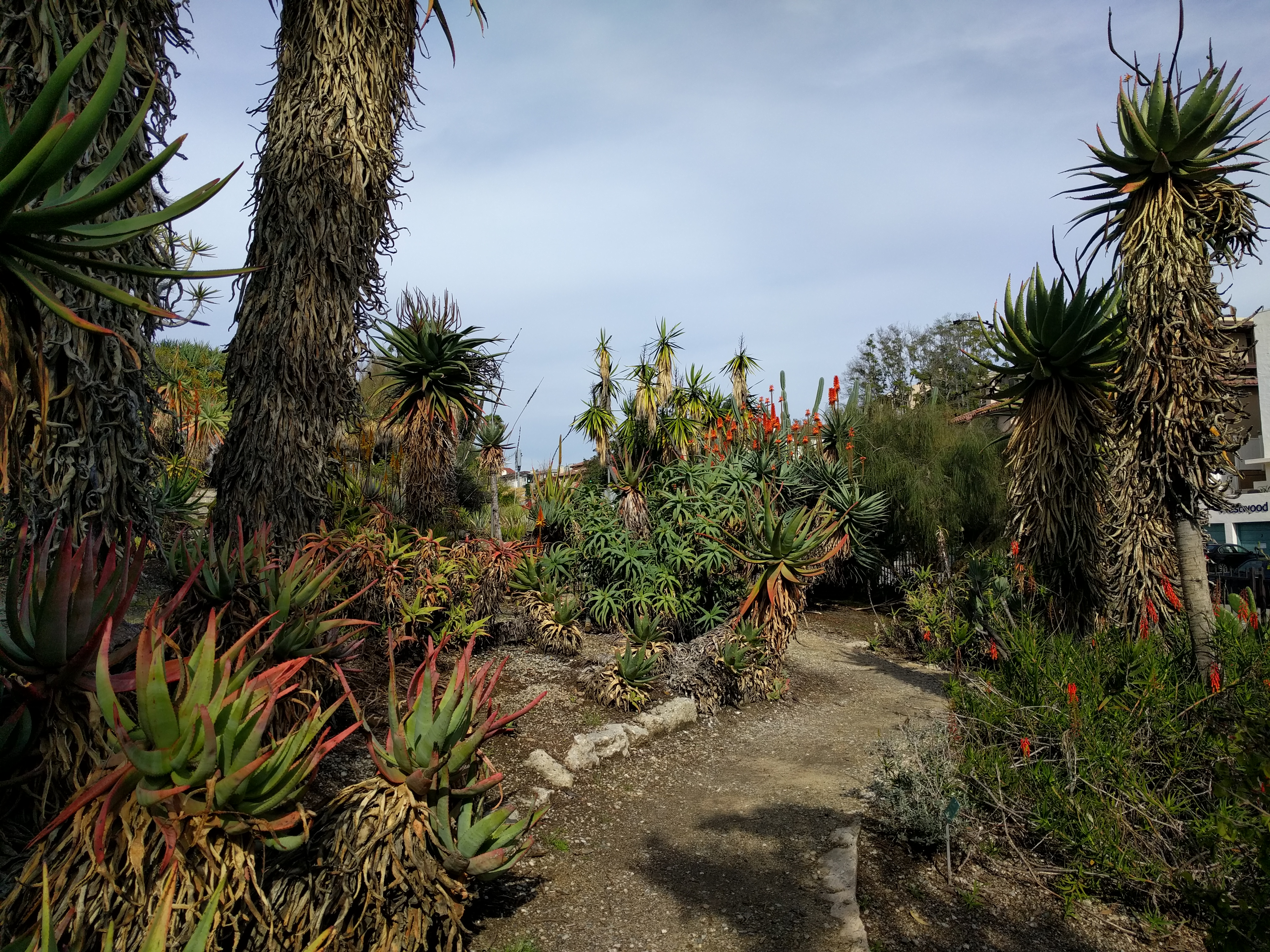
- Aloes at the garden

- Location within the Los Angeles metropolitan area Location within California Location within the United States
- Type: Public
- Location: Los Angeles, California, United States
- Nearest city: Los Angeles
- Coordinates: 34°03′57″N 118°26′28″W
- Area: 7 acres (2.8 ha)
- Created: 1906 by Mildred Esther Mathias Hassler
- Status: Open year round
- Website: www.botgard.ucla.edu

The Mathias Botanical Garden is a 7-acre (2.8 ha) botanical garden with over 3,000 species of plants, located on the southeastern corner of the University of California, Los Angeles campus. It is named after Mildred Esther Mathias Hassler (1906–1995), a noted American botanist. The director is Victoria Sork. It is also the only free public botanical garden in the Greater Los Angeles area.

== History ==
UCLA's botanical garden was started as an academic laboratory shortly after the Westwood, Los Angeles campus opened in 1929, on seven acres preserved for that purpose near the arroyo on the east side of the campus. It was funded in part by the California State Relief Administration, created by newly elected Governor Frank Merriam in 1933 to provide jobs through municipal work projects. The garden's first manager, George C. Groenewegen, started with horticultural donations from the United States Department of Agriculture and the Huntington Botanical Gardens, among others. By 1947 the garden hosted approximately 1,500 different species and varieties of plants. In the 1960s, garden director Mildred E. Mathias, who oversaw the garden from 1956 to 1974, helped to develop it into the "university garden" and opened it for public tours.

The UCLA Botanical Garden of the 1950s included special sections of eucalyptus and other Australian plants, gymnosperms, palms, succulents, aquatics, and camellias. The original native vegetation had been removed, but was replaced by a horticultural display of California perennials. A lathhouse for teaching and research was completed in the northwestern corner of the garden in 1952. Franklin Murphy supported a project to build the recycling stream and ponds. Then with the construction of the La Kretz Botany Building (designed by famed architect Paul R. Williams), a sunny area was set aside for a permanent experimental garden, where plants were grown for exciting cytological studies by the botany faculty. Since the early 1960s, efforts have been made to grow plants from the tropics and subtropics, especially those with magnificent flowers, e.g., the Bignoniaceae. The Garden has not suffered a freeze since winter 1948–49.

In 1979, the facility was named the Mildred E. Mathias Botanical Garden, to honor Dr. Mathias for her numerous contributions to horticulture. By then, the collection had become forest-like. Dr. Arthur C. Gibson was hired as Director in 1980, and began a program to admit more sunlight, hence providing opportunities for many sun-loving groups of plants to grow. Periodically, areas of the Garden were renovated to establish special collections, including Malesian rhododendrons, the lily alliance, bromeliads, cycads, ferns, mediterranean-type climate shrubs (e.g., chaparral), and native plants of the Hawaiian Islands. Other exciting special collections are planned, and will be established in the future as funding becomes available.

The Nest, an outdoor classroom with semicircular bench seating, was constructed by the Garden staff and dedicated in 1996 to the memory of Hazel (Lisa) Kath McMurran, a UCLA alumna. Later that year a massive effort was undertaken to build new paths on the western side of The Garden. The gently sloped new paths and entrances provide access to The Nest and special collections to all visitors, including those with physical disabilities. The garden is maintained by a full-time dedicated staff and around 30 student volunteers.

== Collections ==
Some of the highlights of the botanical garden are:

- More than 3,000 species of living plants, including a diverse and unique collection of tropical and subtropical trees.
- A rich collection of East Asian and Australian plants.
- More than 60 species of palms.
- One of the largest Torrey pines in the world.
- One of the tallest dawn redwoods in North America, a rare living fossil planted in 1948 shortly after the discovery of the species in Western China.
- A diverse collection of succulents demonstrating convergent evolution in plant forms between Old World and New World deserts
- A lush fern garden.

Because the garden is frost-free it can accommodate tropical and sub-tropical plants, including special collections of ferns, palms, eucalyptus and figs. The eucalyptus and figs were brought to the garden during its early years, before they became widespread in the Los Angeles region. Plants are arranged by geographic, taxonomic or cultural needs to demonstrate to students and visitors how specimens are related to one another.

Within the garden, you'll find various themed sections, such as the California Native garden, the Mediterranean Garden, the Hawaiian Garden, the Ancient Forest Section, and many more, allowing visitors to explore the diversity of flora from different parts of the world.

The herbarium, which contains 150,000 dried and pressed plant specimens with a focus on California and the Western United States, is curated by Dr. Anthony Baniaga. The herbarium also has a special library dedicated to botanical literature and journals.

== Notable specimens ==
The garden includes a large dawn redwood (Metasequoia glyptostroboides), from China, an endangered species that was once thought to be extinct.

There is also a large Torrey Pine, a rare tree found mainly in San Diego, California, which has its own nature reserve in San Diego.

In the Hawaiian Section, there are many colorful Hawaiian hibiscus plants, which is also the state flower of Hawaii.

The palm section contains palms native to parts around the world, including the Chilean wine palm (Jubaea chilensis), the Spiny fiber palm (Trithrinax acanthocoma), Pygmy Date Palm (Phoenix roebelenii), and Texas Palmetto (Sabal mexicana).

== Gallery ==
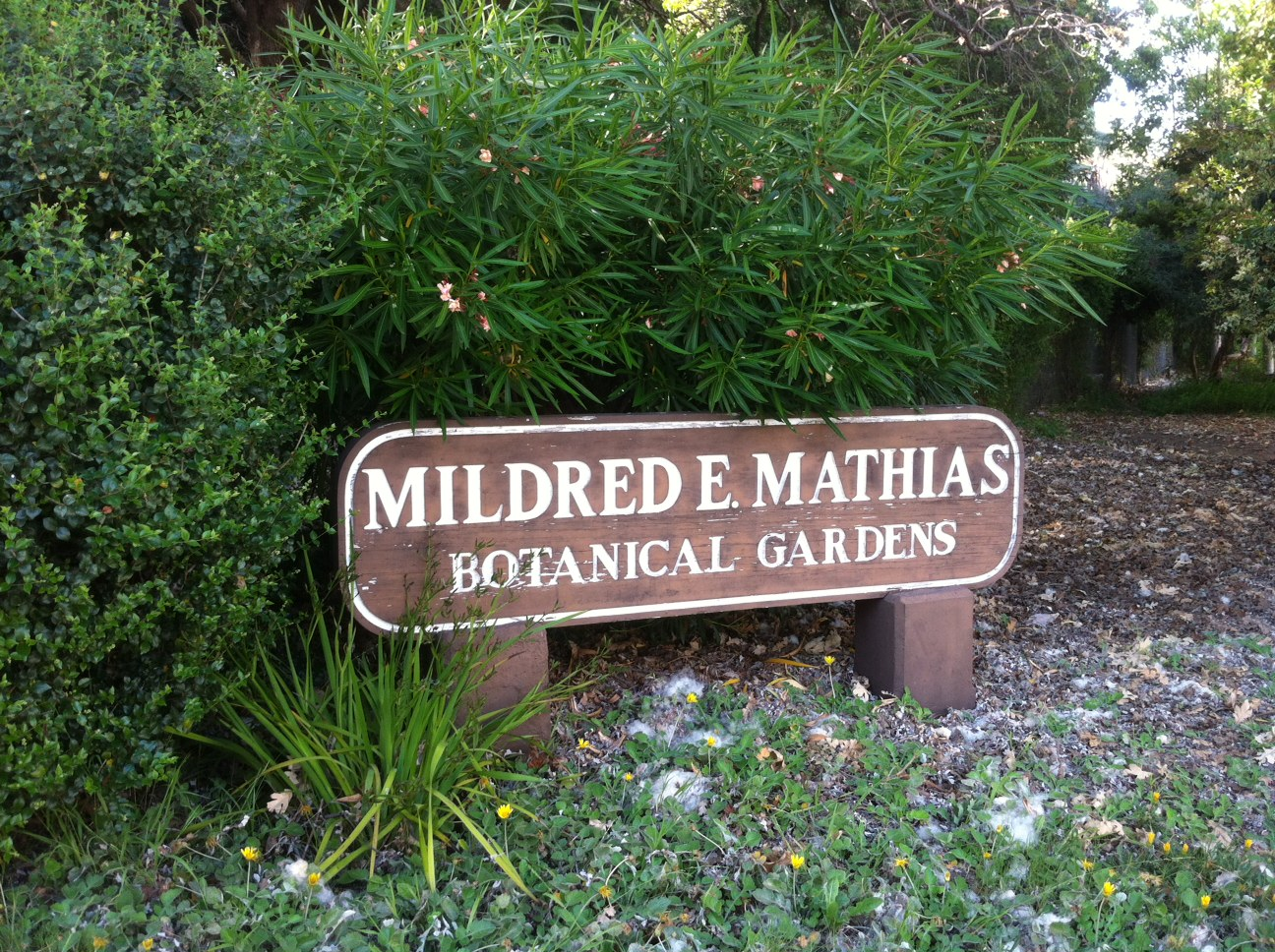
South entrance to garden

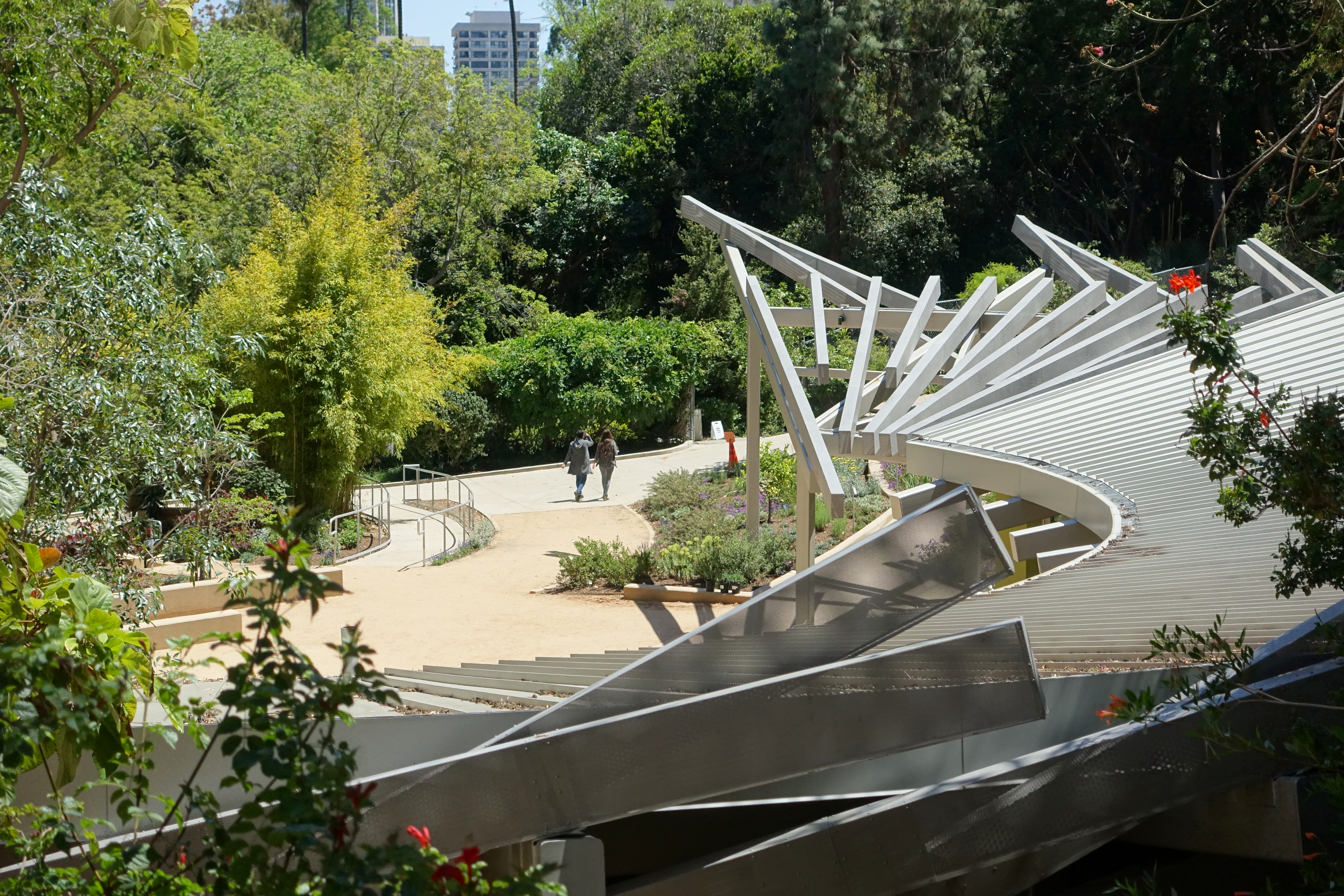

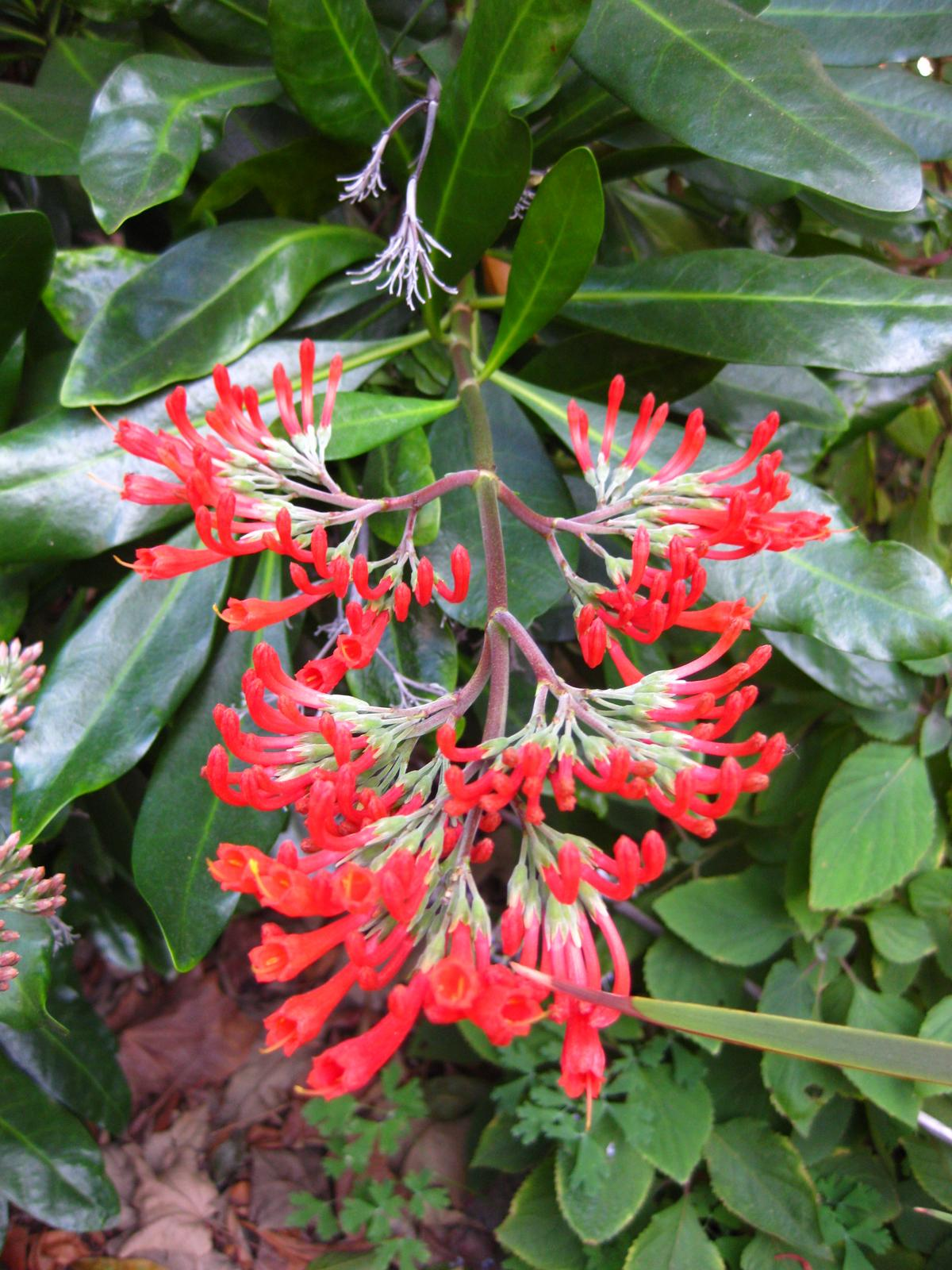
Alberta magna

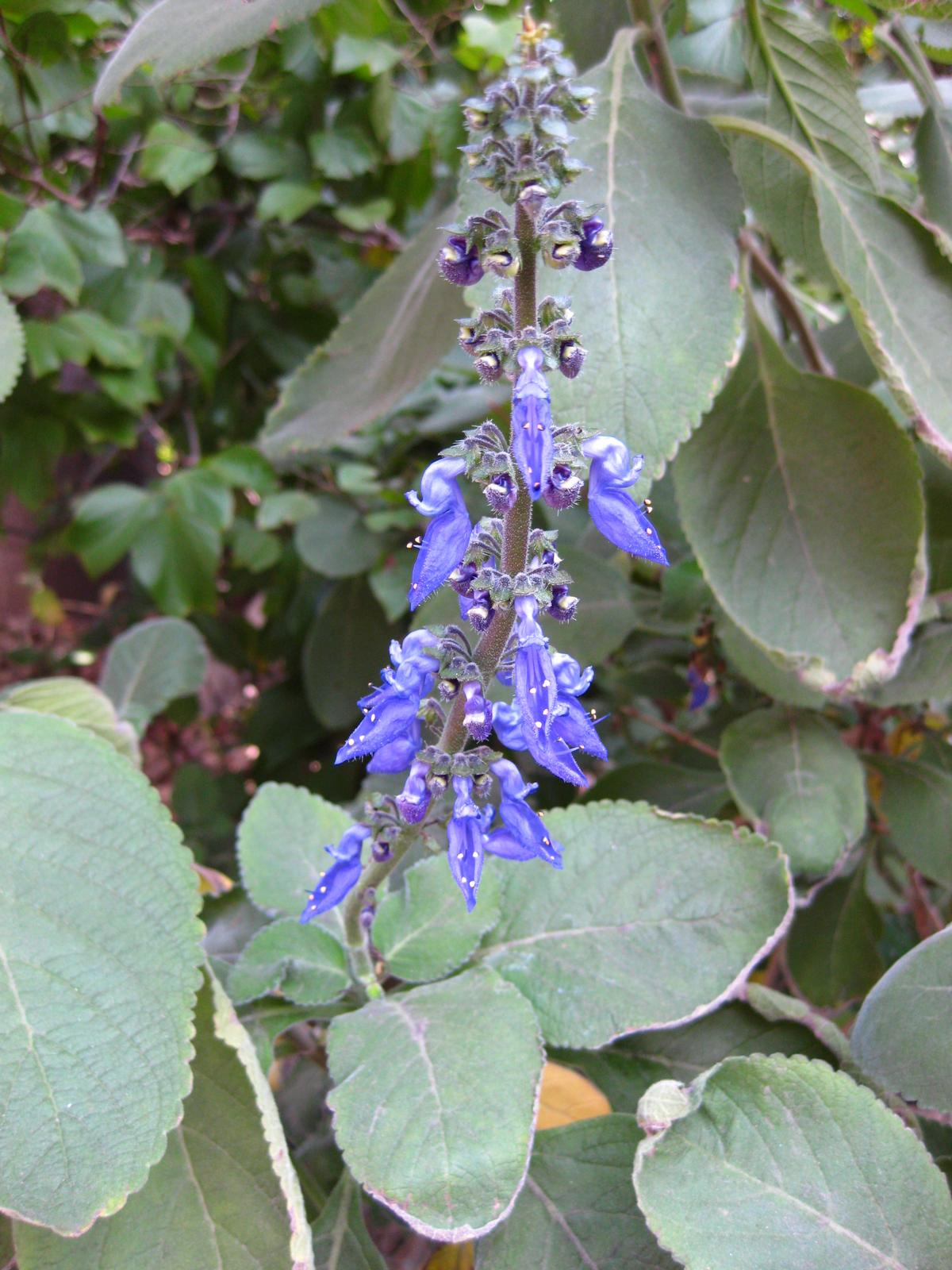
Plectranthus barbatus

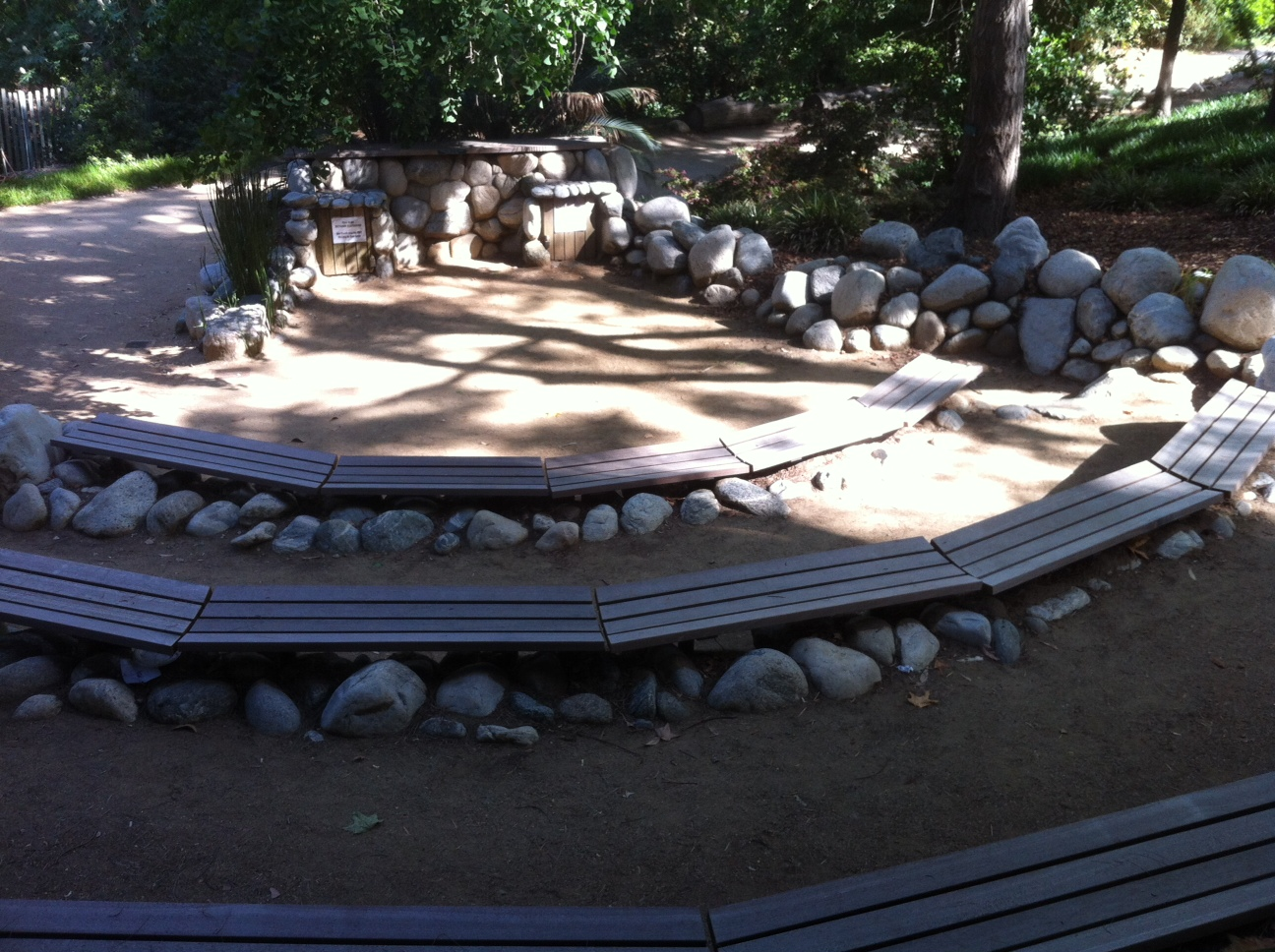
The Nest (outdoor classroom)

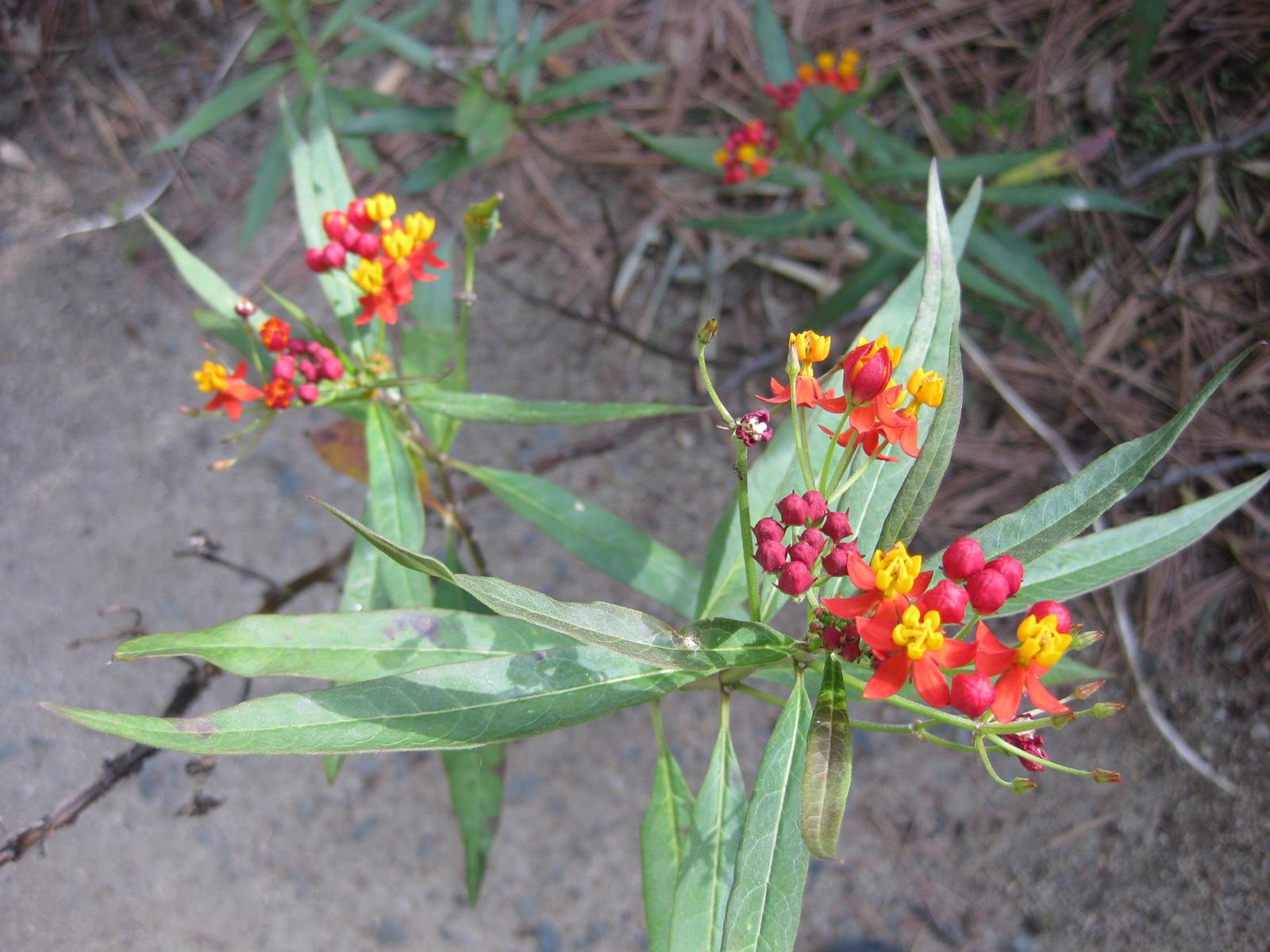
Asclepias curassavica

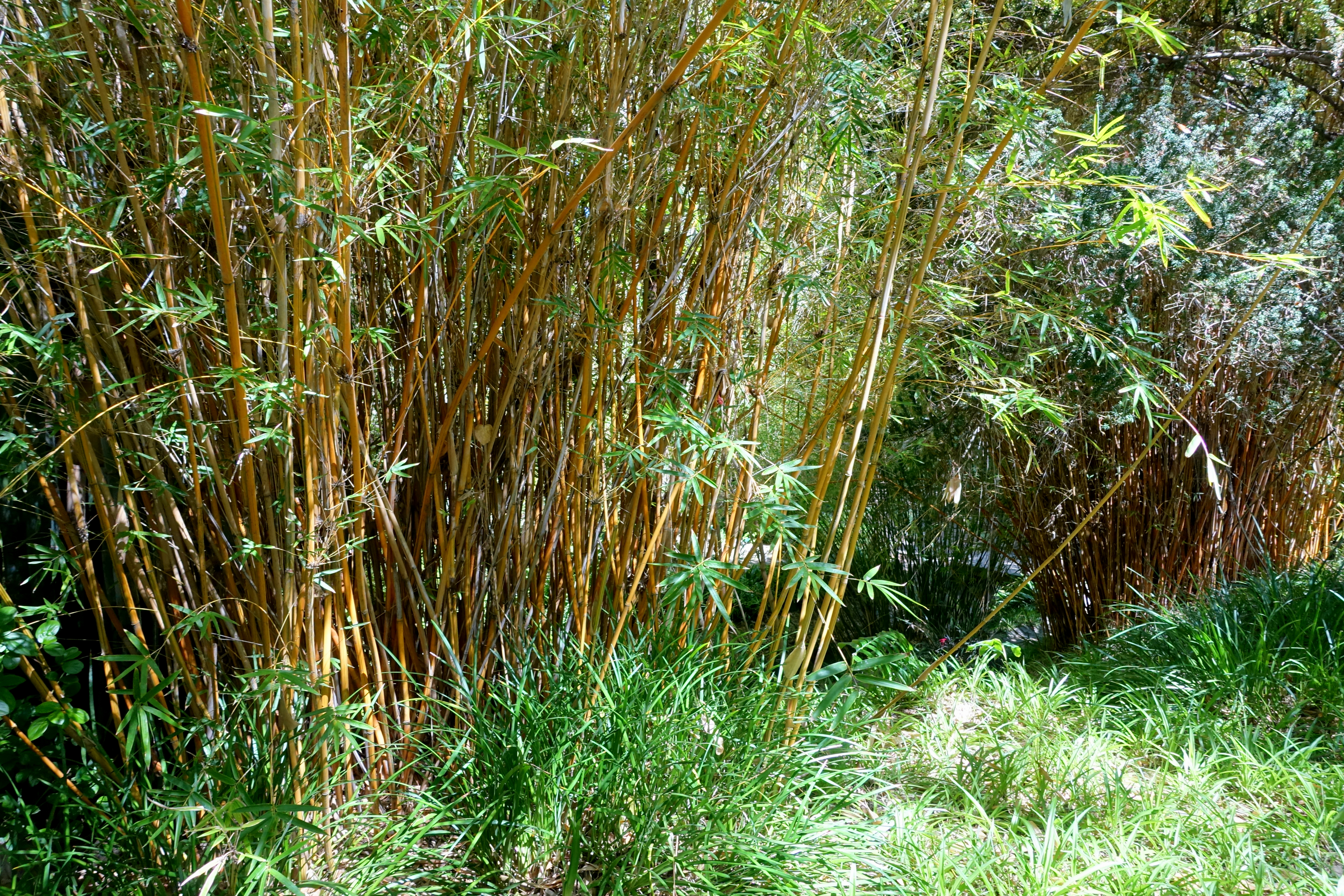
Bamboo

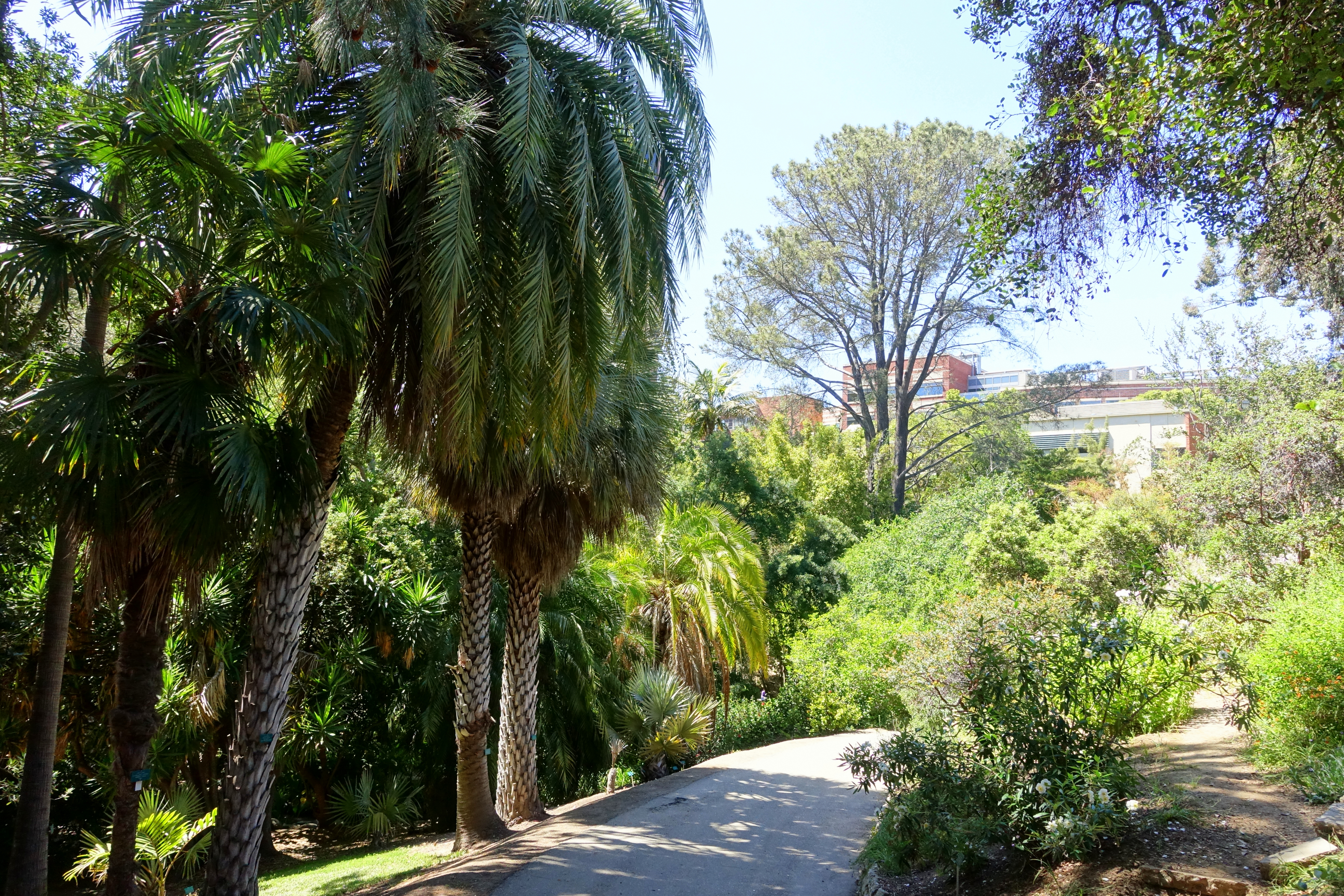
A photo of the garden

A Torrey Pine in front of the school of dentistry

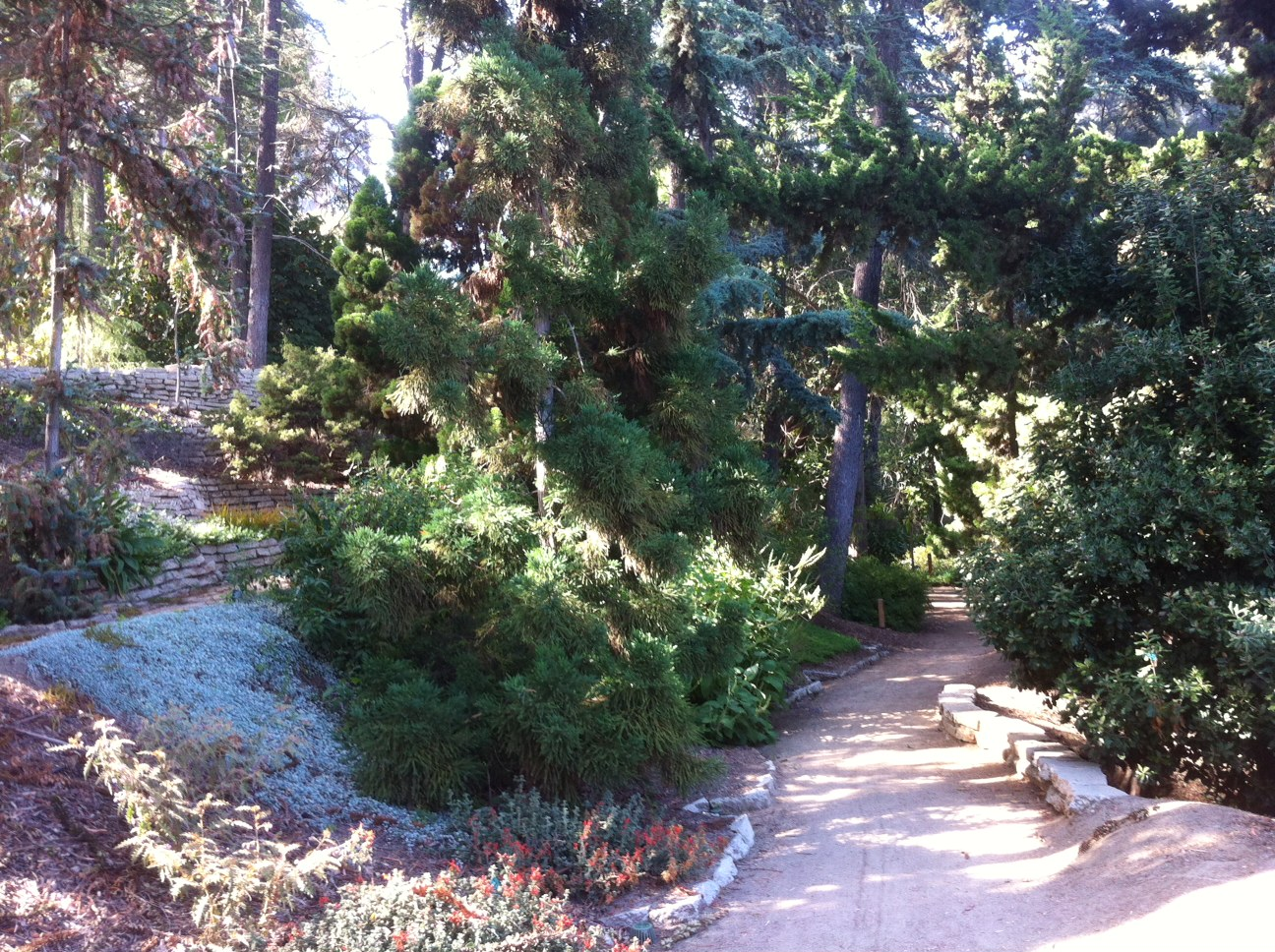
One of the Trails in the Garden

== See also ==
- Mildred Esther Mathias
- List of botanical gardens in the United States
- California native plants
- South Coast Botanic Garden
- Santa Barbara Botanic Garden
- California Botanic Garden
- Manhattan Beach Botanic Garden
