= Mission Canyon, California =

Mission Canyon
- Unincorporated Community; Census Designated Place
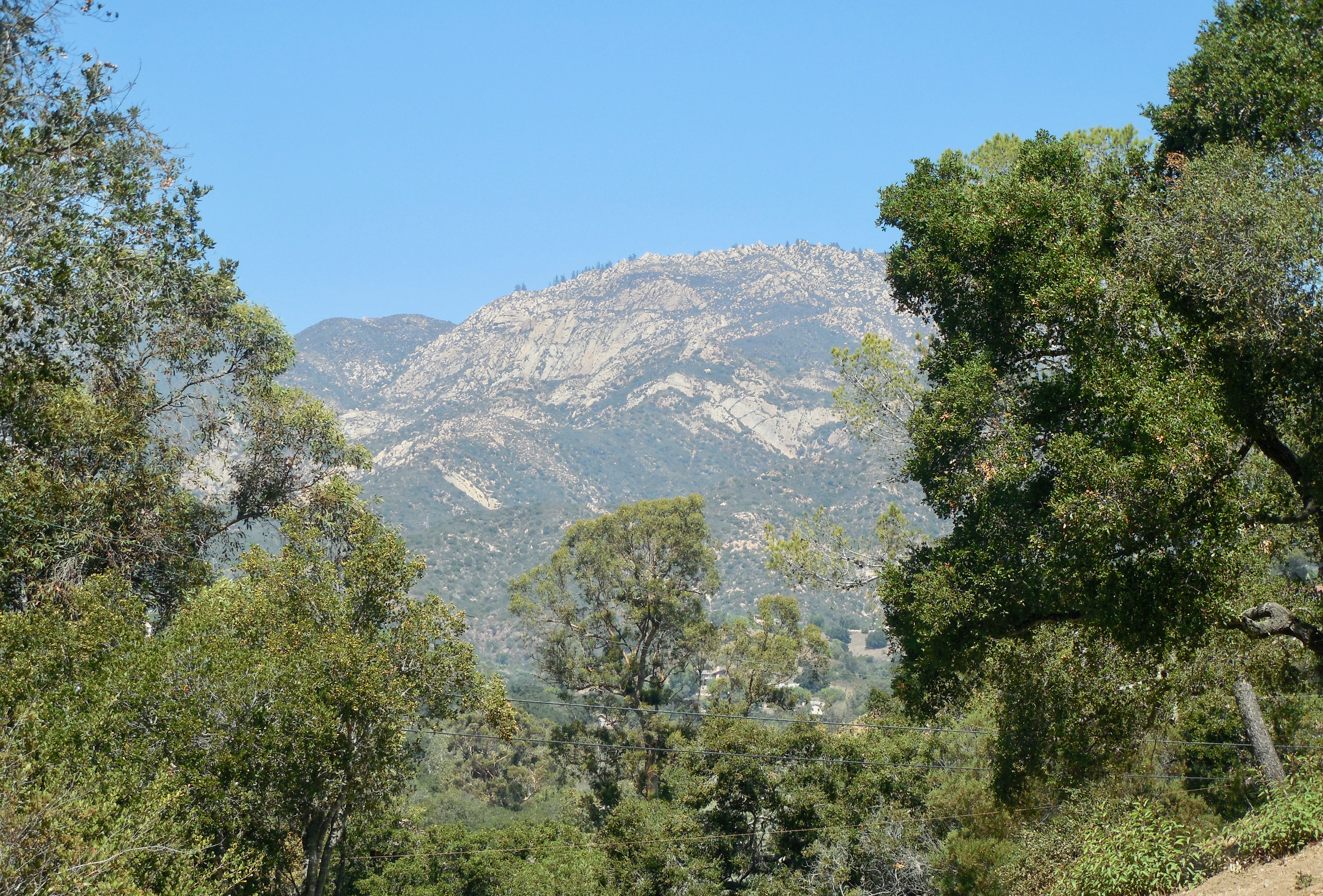
- View of the Santa Ynez Mountains from a southernmost point of Mission Canyon (at the intersection of Mountain Dr. & Mission Ridge Rd.)

- Location in Santa Barbara County and the state of California
- Coordinates: 34°26′59″N 119°42′59″W
- Country: United States
- State: California
- County: Santa Barbara

Government
  - State senator: Monique Limón (D)
  - Assemblymember: Gregg Hart (D)
  - U. S. rep.: Salud Carbajal (D)

Area
  - Total: 1.830 sq mi (4.740 km^{2})
  - Land: 1.800 sq mi (4.662 km^{2})
  - Water: 0.030 sq mi (0.078 km^{2}) 1.64%
- Elevation: 633 ft (193 m)

Population (2020)
  - Total: 2,540
  - Density: 1,410/sq mi (545/km^{2})
- Time zone: UTC-8 (Pacific)
  - Summer (DST): UTC-7 (PDT)
- ZIP code: 93105
- Area code: 805
- FIPS code: 06-48147
- GNIS feature ID: 1853400

Mission Canyon is a census-designated place and an unincorporated suburb of Santa Barbara, California, in Santa Barbara County, United States. The population was 2,540 at the 2020 census, up from 2,381 at the 2010 census.

Mission Canyon is directly north — on the mountain side — of the city of Santa Barbara, and derives its name from the Mission Santa Barbara which is built between Mission Canyon and the center of the city. The canyon itself is one of the most dramatic in the Santa Ynez Mountains with the locally highest peak, La Cumbre Peak 3,988 ft (1,216 m) at the top of the watershed, flanked by Cathedral Peak 3,336 ft (1,017 m) and Arlington Peak 3,258 ft (993 m) to the west, Pine Lookout and Rock Garden to the east, and rugged sandstone formations partially covered with chaparral on both sides of the creek.

State Route 192 (Foothill Road) bisects the southern portion of the area, running from east to west, and Mission Canyon Road passes through the area from north to south. Another major north–south artery is Tunnel Road, which leads to the trailhead for several popular hiking trails that originates from an area of medium density and semi-rural development at the canyon's northern extremity, and extends into Los Padres National Forest in the Santa Ynez Mountains.

The Santa Barbara Botanic Garden is located in Mission Canyon.

== Geography ==
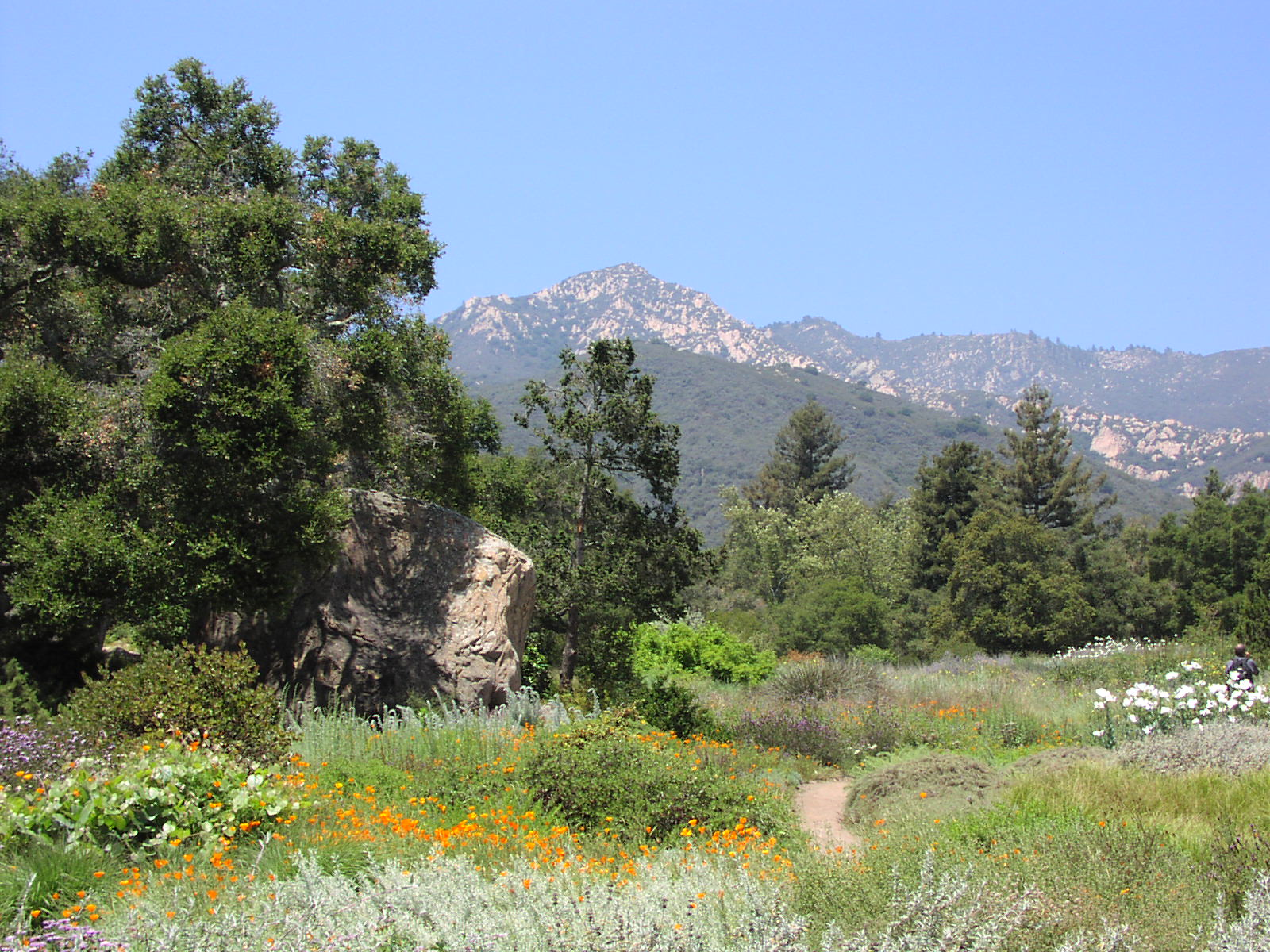
The Santa Barbara Botanic Garden is in Mission Canyon; this view looks north up the canyon towards the headwaters near Cathedral Peak.

The approximate center of Mission Canyon is located at 34°26′59″N 119°42′59″W (34.449797, -119.716315). Situated along the southern facing slopes of the Santa Ynez Mountains, Mission Canyon measures some 1,122 acres comprising an estimated 1,141 parcels primarily consisting of single-family residential development, recreational, open space, and agricultural land uses; but however lacks any commercial or industrial development. Non residential features include the Santa Barbara Botanic Garden, Rocky Nook County Park, the Santa Barbara Woman's Club, and the Santa Barbara County Fire Department Fire Station 15. The topography of the neighborhood varies from relatively flat areas located south of Foothill Road to greater slopes north of Foothill Road, ranging in elevations from approximately 300 ft (91 m) to just over 1,000 ft (305 m) above sea level.

According to the United States Census Bureau, the CDP has a total area of 1.8 square miles (4.7 km^{2}), of which 1.8 square miles (4.7 km^{2}) are land and 0.03 square miles (0.078 km^{2}) (1.64%) is water.

=== Climate ===
This region experiences warm (but not hot) and dry summers, with no average monthly temperatures above 71.6 °F. According to the Köppen Climate Classification system, Mission Canyon has a warm-summer Mediterranean climate, abbreviated "Csb" on climate maps.

== Demographics ==
Historical population
Census	Pop.	Note	%±
2000	2,610		—
2010	2,381		−8.8%
2020	2,540		6.7%
U.S. Decennial Census; 1860–1870 1880-1890; 1900 1910 1920; 1930 1940 1950; 1960 1970 1980; 1990 2000 2010; 2020

Mission Canyon first appeared as a census designated place in the 2000 U.S. census.

=== Racial and ethnic composition ===
Mission Canyon CDP, California – Racial and ethnic composition Note: the US Census treats Hispanic/Latino as an ethnic category. This table excludes Latinos from the racial categories and assigns them to a separate category. Hispanics/Latinos may be of any race.
Race / Ethnicity (NH = Non-Hispanic)	Pop 2000	Pop 2010	Pop 2020	% 2000	% 2010	% 2020
White alone (NH)	2,336	2,062	2,078	89.50%	86.60%	81.81%
Black or African American alone (NH)	11	14	7	0.42%	0.59%	0.28%
Native American or Alaska Native alone (NH)	3	4	3	0.11%	0.17%	0.12%
Asian alone (NH)	33	39	59	1.26%	1.64%	2.32%
Native Hawaiian or Pacific Islander alone (NH)	1	11	1	0.04%	0.46%	0.04%
Other race alone (NH)	4	5	7	0.15%	0.21%	0.28%
Mixed race or Multiracial (NH)	49	48	93	1.88%	2.02%	3.66%
Hispanic or Latino (any race)	173	198	292	6.63%	8.32%	11.50%
Total	2,610	2,381	2,540	100.00%	100.00%	100.00%

=== 2020 census ===
As of the 2020 census, Mission Canyon had a population of 2,540 and a population density of 1,411.1 inhabitants per square mile (544.8/km^{2}). The whole population lived in households. The median age was 53.2 years. The age distribution was 14.6% under the age of 18, 5.7% aged 18 to 24, 20.1% aged 25 to 44, 28.2% aged 45 to 64, and 31.3% aged 65 or older. For every 100 females, there were 91.8 males, and for every 100 females age 18 and over, there were 92.2 males.

The racial makeup of Mission Canyon was 84.7% White, 0.4% Black or African American, 0.3% American Indian and Alaska Native, 2.5% Asian, 0.0% Native Hawaiian and Other Pacific Islander, 2.8% from other races, and 9.2% from two or more races. Hispanic or Latino residents of any race made up 11.5% of the population.

90.8% of residents lived in urban areas, while 9.2% lived in rural areas.

There were 1,041 households, of which 20.5% had children under the age of 18 living in them. Of all households, 51.8% were married-couple households, 6.5% were cohabiting couple households, 23.3% had a female householder with no spouse or partner present, and 18.3% had a male householder with no spouse or partner present. About 26.4% of households were one-person households, and 14.9% had one person aged 65 or older. The average household size was 2.44. There were 674 families (64.7% of all households).

There were 1,122 housing units at an average density of 623.3 units per square mile (240.7 units/km^{2}). Of these, 1,041 (92.8%) were occupied, 76.4% were owner-occupied, and 23.6% were occupied by renters. The homeowner vacancy rate was 1.1%, and the rental vacancy rate was 7.9%.

=== 2010 census ===
The 2010 United States census reported that Mission Canyon had a population of 2,381. The population density was 1,538.8 inhabitants per square mile (594.1/km^{2}). The racial makeup of Mission Canyon was 2,193 (92.1%) White, 14 (0.6%) African American, 17 (0.7%) Native American, 40 (1.7%) Asian, 11 (0.5%) Pacific Islander, 35 (1.5%) from other races, and 71 (3.0%) from two or more races. Hispanic or Latino of any race were 198 persons (8.3%).

The Census reported that 2,372 people (99.6% of the population) lived in households, 0 (0%) lived in non-institutionalized group quarters, and 9 (0.4%) were institutionalized.

There were 1,020 households, out of which 230 (22.5%) had children under the age of 18 living in them, 547 (53.6%) were opposite-sex married couples living together, 59 (5.8%) had a female householder with no husband present, 20 (2.0%) had a male householder with no wife present. There were 59 (5.8%) unmarried opposite-sex partnerships, and 14 (1.4%) same-sex married couples or partnerships. 264 households (25.9%) were made up of individuals, and 97 (9.5%) had someone living alone who was 65 years of age or older. The average household size was 2.33. There were 626 families (61.4% of all households); the average family size was 2.70.

The population was spread out, with 368 people (15.5%) under the age of 18, 100 people (4.2%) aged 18 to 24, 458 people (19.2%) aged 25 to 44, 973 people (40.9%) aged 45 to 64, and 482 people (20.2%) who were 65 years of age or older. The median age was 51.3 years. For every 100 females, there were 95.5 males. For every 100 females age 18 and over, there were 97.0 males.

There were 1,075 housing units at an average density of 694.7 per square mile (268.2/km^{2}), of which 782 (76.7%) were owner-occupied, and 238 (23.3%) were occupied by renters. The homeowner vacancy rate was 0.8%; the rental vacancy rate was 4.4%. 1,828 people (76.8% of the population) lived in owner-occupied housing units and 544 people (22.8%) lived in rental housing units.
