= Austropeucedanum =

Scientific classification
- Kingdom: Plantae
- Clade: Tracheophytes
- Clade: Angiosperms
- Clade: Eudicots
- Clade: Asterids
- Order: Apiales
- Family: Apiaceae
- Genus: Austropeucedanum; Mathias & Constance
- Species: A. oreopansil

Binomial name
- Austropeucedanum oreopansil (Griseb.) Mathias & Constance

Synonyms
- Peucedanum oreopansil Griseb.

Genus of flowering plants

Austropeucedanum is a monotypic genus of flowering plants in the family Apiaceae. Its only species is Austropeucedanum oreopansil. It is endemic to Argentina.
