= Cotopaxia asplundii =

Conservation status
- Vulnerable (IUCN 3.1)

Scientific classification
- Kingdom: Plantae
- Clade: Tracheophytes
- Clade: Angiosperms
- Clade: Eudicots
- Clade: Asterids
- Order: Apiales
- Family: Apiaceae
- Genus: Cotopaxia
- Species: C. asplundii

Binomial name
- Cotopaxia asplundii Mathias & Constance

Species of flowering plant

Cotopaxia asplundii is a species of flowering plant in the family Apiaceae. It is endemic to Ecuador. Its natural habitat is subtropical or tropical high-altitude grassland. It is threatened by habitat loss.
