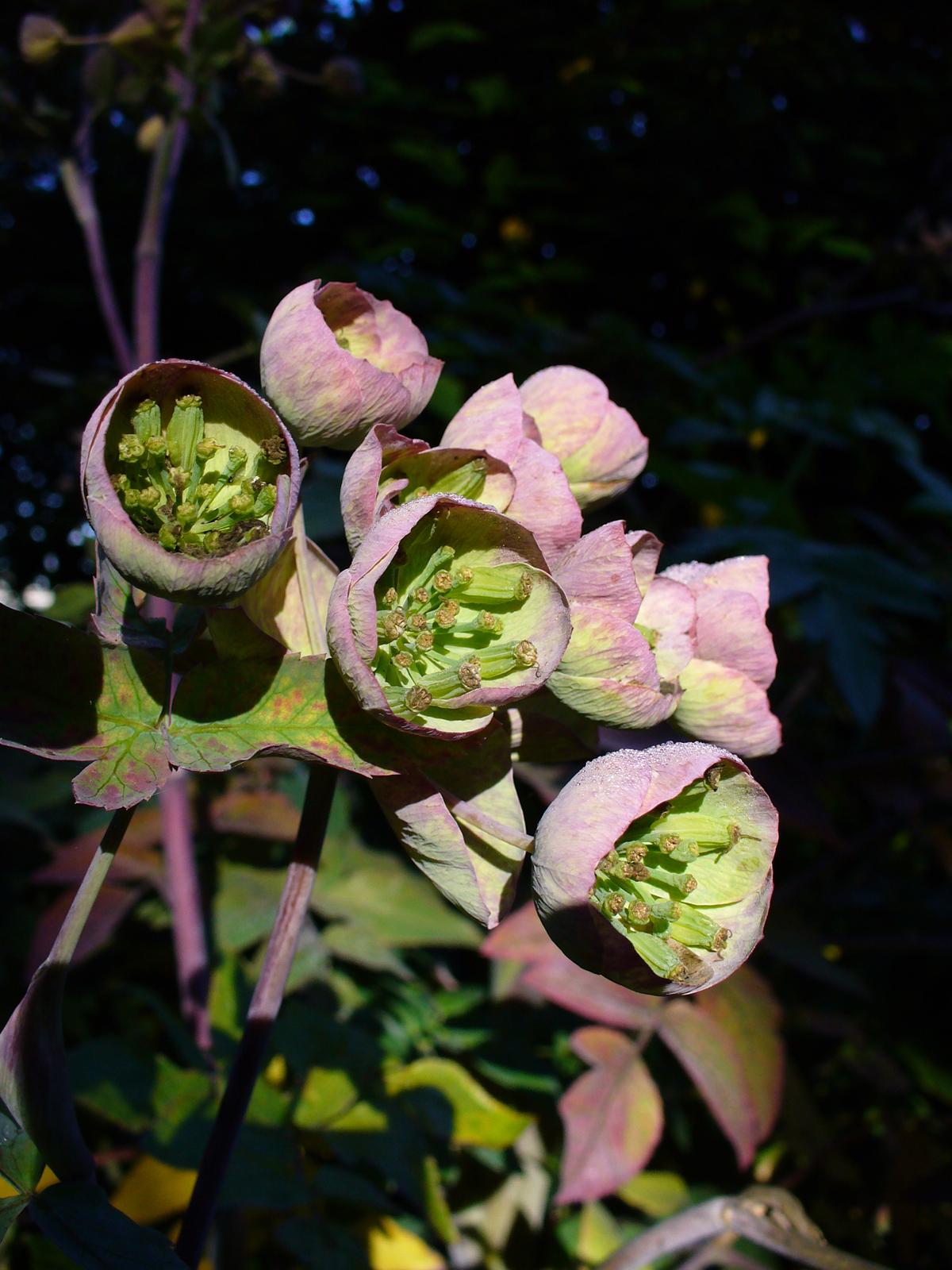
- Mathiasella bupleuroides

Scientific classification
- Kingdom: Plantae
- Clade: Tracheophytes
- Clade: Angiosperms
- Clade: Eudicots
- Clade: Asterids
- Order: Apiales
- Family: Apiaceae
- Subfamily: Apioideae
- Tribe: Selineae
- Genus: Mathiasella; Constance & C.L.Hitchc.
- Species: M. bupleuroides

Binomial name
- Mathiasella bupleuroides Constance & C.L.Hitchc.

= Mathiasella =

Species of flowering plant

Mathiasella is a monotypic genus of flowering plants belonging to the family Apiaceae. It is in the Tribe Selineae. The genus only contains one known species, Mathiasella bupleuroides Constance & C.L.Hitchc.

It is native to Mexico.

The genus name of Mathiasella is in honour of Mildred Esther Mathias (1906–1995), an American botanist and college professor and also Director of the UCLA Botanic garden. The Latin specific epithet of bupleuroides means "like Bupleurum" in recognition that it has visual similarities to Bupleurum, another genus of plants in the Apiaceae family, that has worldwide distribution. Both the genus and the species were first described and published in Amer. J. Bot. Vol.41 on page 56 in 1954.

== Known cultivars ==
'Green Dream' is a herbaceous perennial that grows up to 1m tall with large, dark green, highly divided leaves. The blooms are made up of jade-green bracts surrounding small, black flowers. They appear in late spring and last to autumn, gradually maturing to pink. It is used in gardens in the UK and USA. It grows in moist but well-drained soil in full sun to partial shade. It may need protection from the harshest winter frosts (in the UK). The cut flowers are used ornamentally, fresh or dried.
