= SCBG =

SCBG may refer to:

- Santa Cruz, Big Trees and Pacific Railway, a freight and heritage railroad in Northern California, United States
- South China Botanical Garden, a large botanical garden in Guangzhou, Guangdong Province, China
- South Coast Botanic Garden, a botanical garden in the Palos Verdes Hills area of Los Angeles County, California, United States
