= Victoria Sork =

Professor and Dean of Life Sciences

- Born: Victoria Louise Sork; Los Angeles
- Education: University of California, Irvine (BS); University of Michigan (PhD)
- Awards: Fellow of the American Association for the Advancement of Science (2004)
- Scientific career
- Fields: Oaks; Epigenetics; Population genomics Conservation genetics
- Workplaces: University of California, Los Angeles
- Thesis: Demographic Consequences of Mammalian Seed Dispersal for Pignut Hickory (1979)
- Website: sorklab.eeb.ucla.edu

Victoria Louise Sork is an American scientist who is Professor and Dean of Life Sciences at University of California, Los Angeles. She studies tree populations in California and the Eastern United States using genomics, evolutionary biology and conservation biology. Sork is a Fellow of the American Association for the Advancement of Science.

== Early life and education ==
Sork was born in Los Angeles. She earned her undergraduate degree in biological sciences at the University of California, Irvine. She moved to the University of Michigan for her graduate studies where she was awarded a PhD in 1979 for research on seed dispersal in pignut hickory (Carya glabra).

== Research and career ==
Sork studies the evolution of trees in California's oak woodlands and savannas. She believes that trees are crucial determinants of particular ecosystems and that their considerable population sizes offer a good context for the study of evolution. Trees provide a living record of the changing climate, and scientists like Sork can sequence their genome to evaluate the impact of different environmental conditions. Sork uses genetic markers to monitor gene flow and genomics to understand genetic variation. She has focussed on Oaks (Quercus) and particularly Quercus lobata (Valley oaks), studying their local adaptation, the molecular ecology of their pollen, phylogeography of the genetic variation, hybridisation and how climate change will impact them.

In the 2000s Sork started working with Jessica Wright of the Food and Drug Administration on a project that evaluated which trees would be most able to adapt to a changing climate. This has involved gathering tens of thousands of seeds from almost one hundred locations, growing them to saplings in greenhouses and planting them in experimental gardens. She sequenced the genomes of the mother trees to compare with current genetic information, and combined this with how well the trees grew in different environments. She has investigated how the trees that are planted in the wake of the Californian wildfires will respond to a warming climate. Her studies showed that genomics can be used to inform strategies for conservation, emphasising the need for planting trees that can withstand changing ecosystems and higher temperatures. She showed that trees with "beneficial" genetic traits would have significantly higher growth rates than those without them.

Sork is part of a $10 million conservation strategy, the California Conservation Genomics Project, which aims to transform land is managed in California.

In October 2024, Sork was named as a defendant in a lawsuit filed by Priyanga Amarasekare, a former professor of ecology and evolutionary biology at UCLA. The lawsuit alleges that Amarasekare was subjected to discriminatory, harassing, and retaliatory conduct based on her gender, race, and national origin, and that she faced adverse actions including suspension and pay cuts for opposing such conduct. According to the complaint, Sork, as a former dean, was involved in filing charges against Amarasekare and played a role in the disciplinary actions that led to the lawsuit.

== Academic service ==
She was appointed Chair of the Department of Ecology and Evolutionary Biology in 2004. In 2009 Sork was made Dean of the UCLA College of Letters and Science Life Sciences Division. Under her leadership, UCLA have established new initiatives, including the La Kretz Center for California Conservation Science, and The Mildred E. Mathias Botanical Garden.

=== Awards and honours ===
In 2004 Sork was elected a Fellow of the American Association for the Advancement of Science (FAAAS).

- Molecular Ecology prize (2020)
