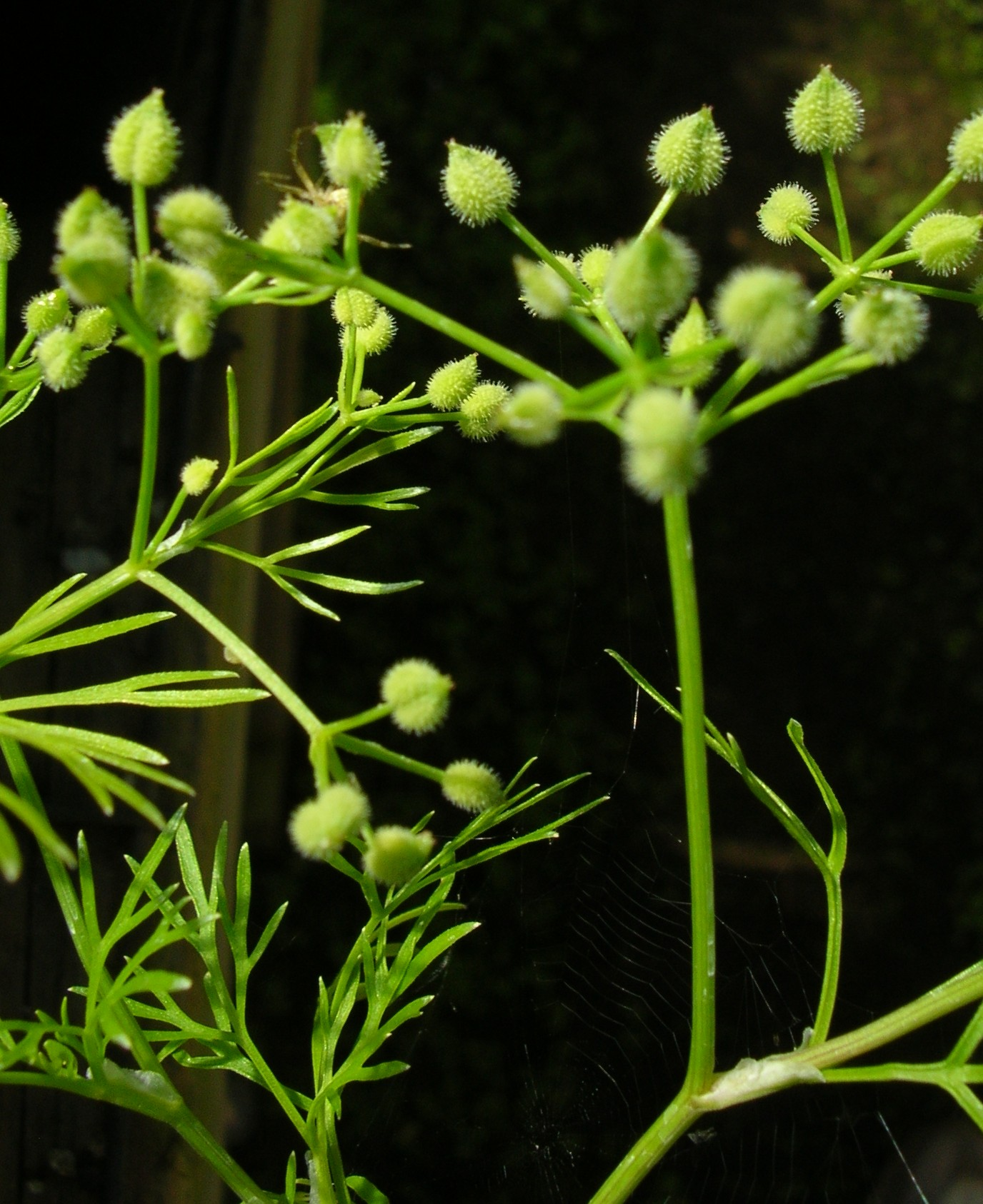

Conservation status
- Imperiled (NatureServe)

Scientific classification
- Kingdom: Plantae
- Clade: Tracheophytes
- Clade: Angiosperms
- Clade: Eudicots
- Clade: Asterids
- Order: Apiales
- Family: Apiaceae
- Genus: Spermolepis
- Species: S. hawaiiensis

Binomial name
- Spermolepis hawaiiensis H.Wolff

= Spermolepis hawaiiensis =

Species of plant

Spermolepis hawaiiensis is a rare species of flowering plant in the carrot family known by the common name Hawai'i scaleseed. It is endemic to Hawaii, where it is known from the islands of Kauai, Maui, Oahu, Molokai, Lanai, and Hawaii. It is threatened by the degradation of its habitat and it is a federally listed endangered species.

This plant is an annual herb producing a slender erect stem up to 20 centimeters tall and bears small white flowers. It grows in forest, woodland, shrubland, and chaparral habitat.

In 1999 there were 12 populations for a total of 2000 to 6000 individuals. It is present at Diamond Head on Oahu and the Pohakuloa Training Area on Hawaii.
