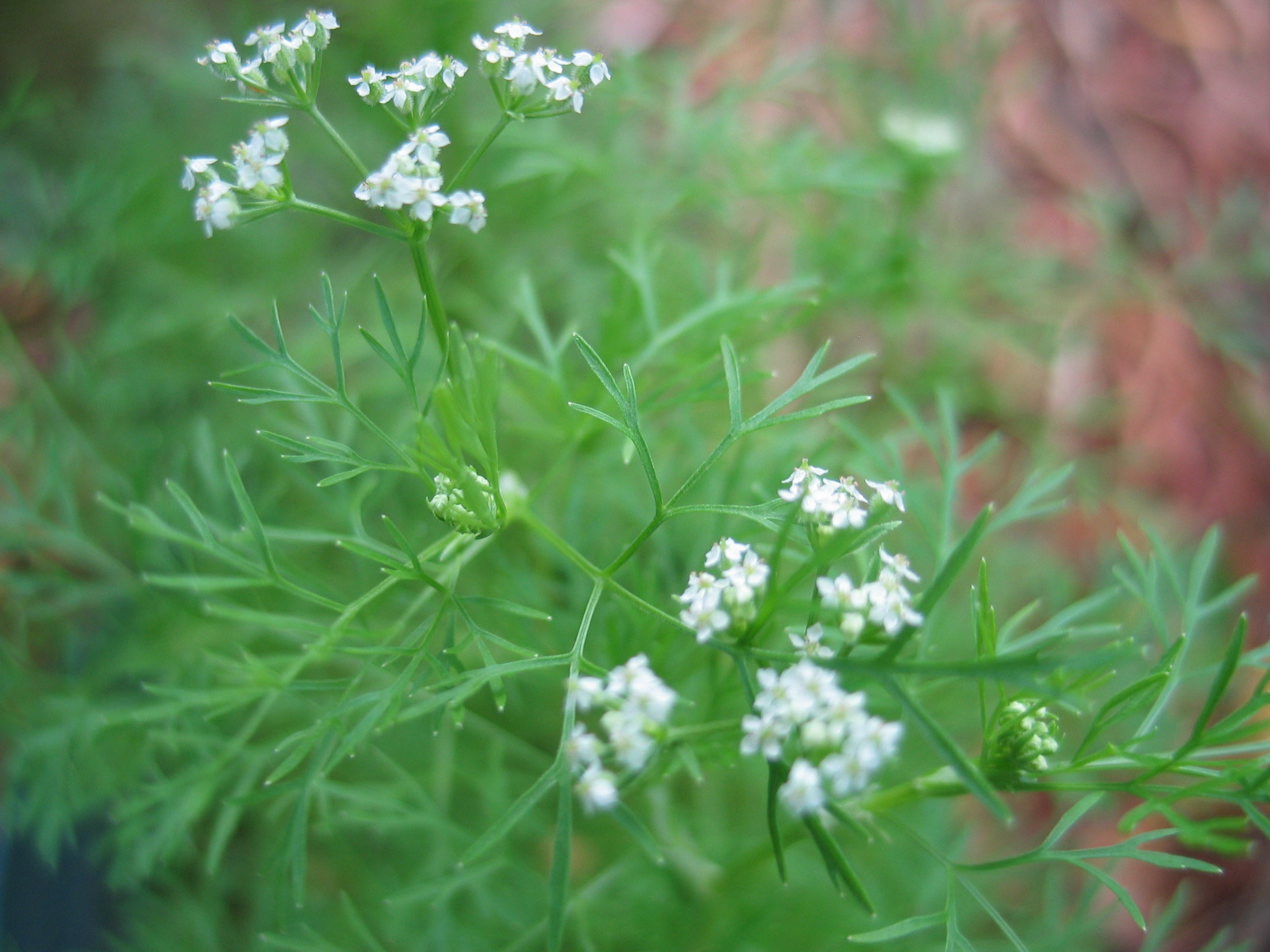
- Spermolepis hawaiiensis

Scientific classification
- Kingdom: Plantae
- Clade: Tracheophytes
- Clade: Angiosperms
- Clade: Eudicots
- Clade: Asterids
- Order: Apiales
- Family: Apiaceae
- Subfamily: Apioideae
- Tribe: Selineae
- Genus: Spermolepis; Raf.

= Spermolepis =

Genus of flowering plants

Spermolepis is a genus of flowering plants belonging to the family Apiaceae.

Its native range is the Hawaiian Islands, the mainland United States, Mexico and Argentina.

Species:

- Spermolepis castellanosii Pérez-Mor.
- Spermolepis diffusa (Nutt. ex DC.) G.L.Nesom
- Spermolepis divaricata (Walter) Raf.
- Spermolepis echinata (Nutt. ex DC.) A.Heller
- Spermolepis gigantea (J.M.Coult. & Rose) G.L.Nesom
- Spermolepis hawaiiensis H.Wolff
- Spermolepis inermis (Nutt. ex DC.) Mathias & Constance
- Spermolepis infernensis G.L.Nesom
- Spermolepis laevis G.L.Nesom
- Spermolepis lateriflora G.L.Nesom
- Spermolepis organensis G.L.Nesom
