= La Cumbre Peak =

Mountain in California, United States

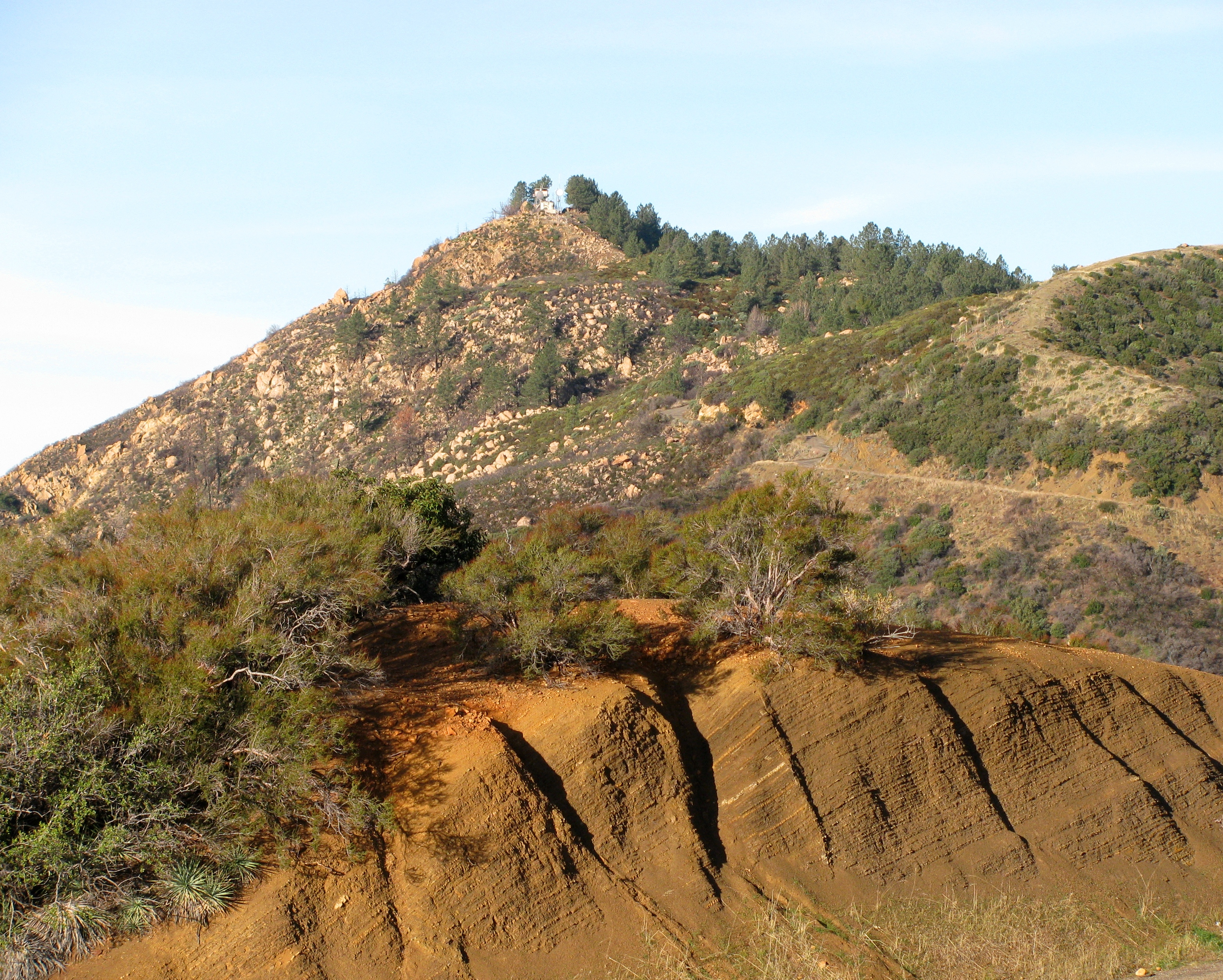
- Viewed of La Cumbre Peak from the east with a prominent outcrop of the Juncal Formation in the foreground.

Highest point
- Elevation: 3,997 ft (1,218 m) NAVD 88
- Prominence: 1,010 ft (310 m)
- Coordinates: 34°29′40″N 119°42′45″W

Geography
- Location within California Location within the United States
- Location: Santa Barbara County, California, U.S.
- Parent range: Santa Ynez Mountains
- Topo map: USGS Santa Barbara

Climbing
- Easiest route: Road

La Cumbre Peak is a 3,997-foot (1,218 m) peak in the Santa Ynez Mountains north of Santa Barbara, California and located within the Los Padres National Forest. Composed of boulders and slabs of the Matilija Sandstone amid groves of pine trees, it is the highest summit in proximity to the city. Adjacent to La Cumbre are Arlington Peak (3,258 ft (993 m)) and Cathedral Peak (3,336 ft (1,017 m)). Other peaks within the Santa Ynez Range include Santa Ynez Peak, 15 miles (24 km) to the west, and Divide Peak, 15 miles (24 km) to the east.

East Camino Cielo (originally known as Ridge Route) was constructed between October 1930 and June 1931 as a single lane road that extended 18 miles (29 kilometres) from San Marcos Pass to the summit of La Cumbre Peak. The intermittently curvaceous road was opened to the public, built with frequent turnouts and a set maximum speed limit of 15 mi (24 km) per hour. Today the road is frequently used by runners and cyclists for training, as the elevation gain is substantial and sustained, while there is relatively little car traffic.

Construction of a fire lookout station upon the summit featuring a seasonal glass house was completed in the summer of 1923 by the US Forest Service, but may have been impacted by a fire that approached it from three sides in September of that year. In 1946, "La Cumbre Peak Lookout" was built to replace a California Region 5 Plan 4AR cabin that was mounted on a 10 ft (3.0 m) open timber tower. Utilizing an "innovative experimental design" that employed relatively high walls and sloped glass, the newer structure was considered to be expensive for its time (at a cost of $6,500) and was therefore the only model of its type to be constructed. The lookout was listed in the National Historic Lookout Register on June 19, 2010.
