= Arlington Peak (California) =

Mountain in Santa Barbara County, California, United States

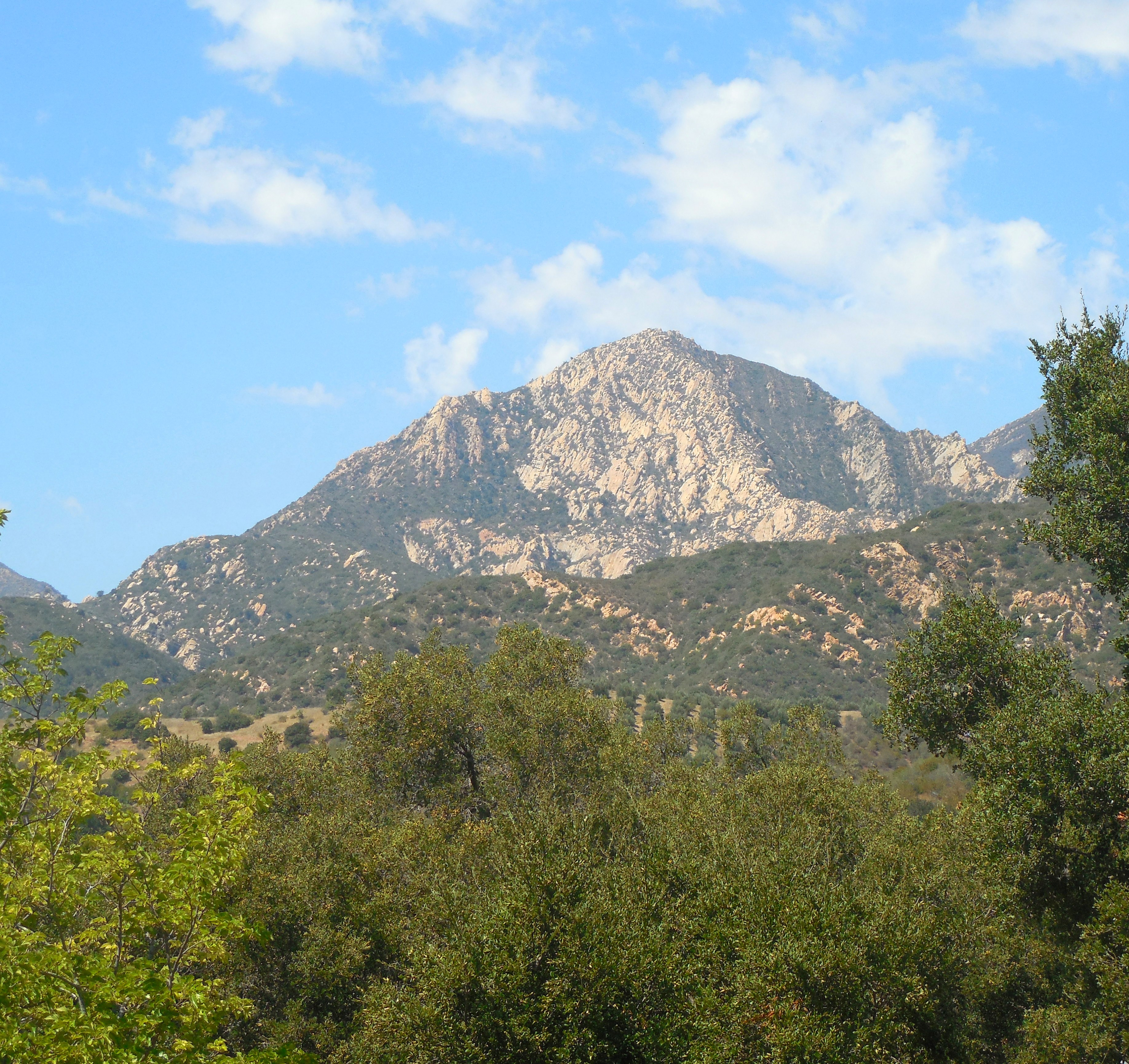
- Easterly view of Arlington Peak from Skofield Park in Santa Barbara.

Highest point
- Elevation: 3,258 ft (993 m)
- Prominence: 75 ft (23 m)
- Coordinates: 34°28′58″N 119°42′52″W

Geography
- Location within California Location within the United States
- Location: Santa Barbara County, California, U.S.
- Parent range: Santa Ynez Mountains
- Topo map: USGS Santa Barbara

Climbing
- Easiest route: Trail

Arlington Peak is a 3,258-foot (993 m) high peak within the Santa Ynez Mountains located north of Santa Barbara, California, adjacent to the south of La Cumbre Peak and to the southeast of Cathedral Peak. The name of the peak purportedly originated in 1889 from the staff of the Arlington Hotel who referred to the area comprising the three peaks as The Arlington Crags. Arlington Peak was officially named in 2004 by the United States Board on Geographic Names.

The peak is accessible via a 4.1-mile (7 km) "out and back" trail used for hiking and rock climbing which has an estimated 2,100-foot (640 m) elevation gain from the trailhead and is rated as difficult. There have been occasional incidents where hikers were injured and required evacuation.

== Geology ==
Arlington Peak is primarily composed of Matilija Sandstone.
