= Santa Barbara Botanic Garden =

Botanical garden in Mission Canyon, Santa Barbara, California

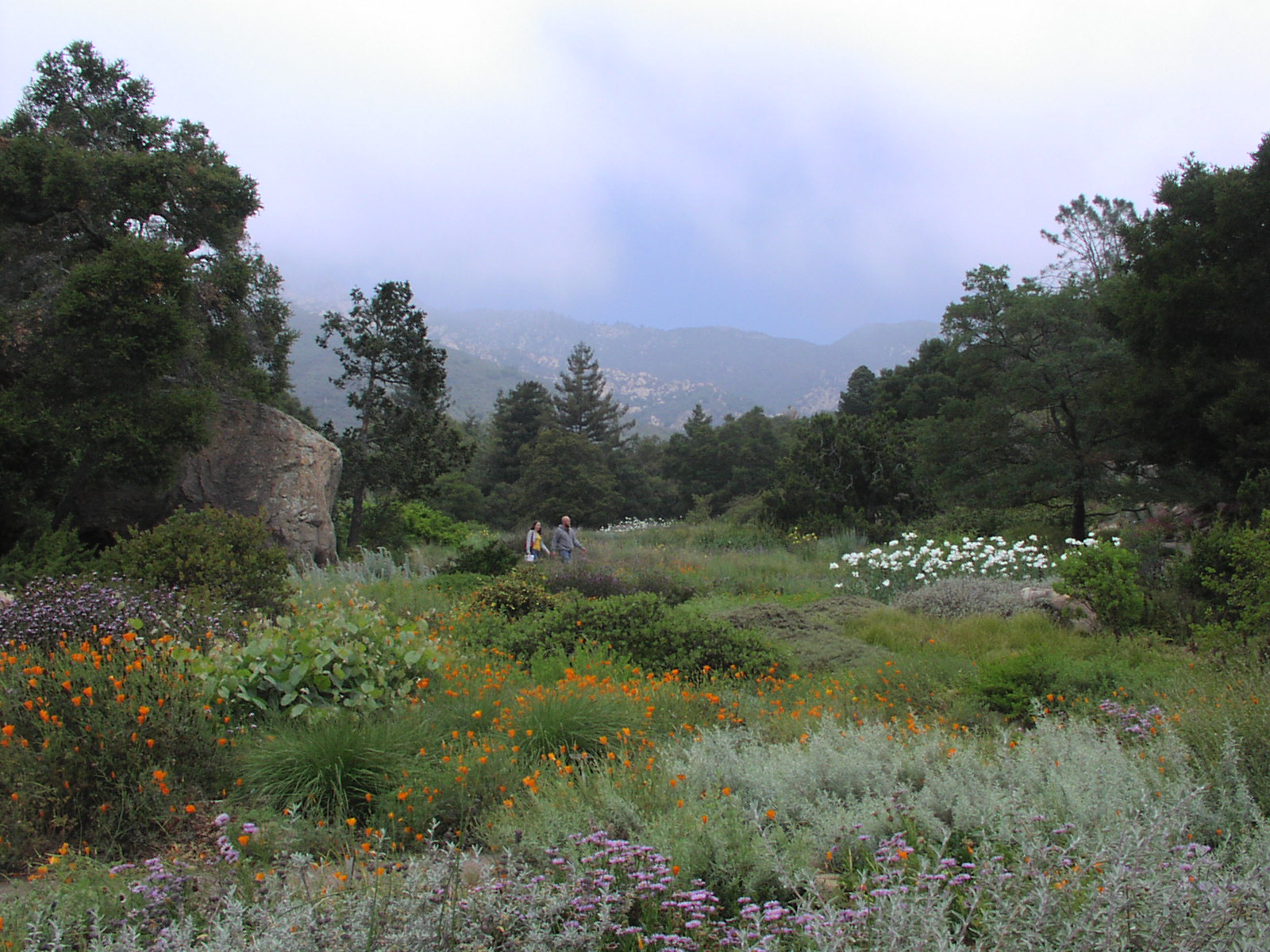
- The central meadow region of the Botanic Garden, looking north

- Location within California Location within the United States
- Type: Botanical garden
- Location: Mission Canyon, Santa Barbara, California, United States
- Coordinates: 34°27′13.63″N 119°42′33.96″W
- Area: 78 acres (32 ha)
- Opened: 1926
- Website: sbbotanicgarden.org

The Santa Barbara Botanic Garden is a 78-acre botanical garden (32 ha), containing over 1,000 species of rare and indigenous plants. It is located in Mission Canyon, Santa Barbara County, California, United States.

The purpose of the Garden is to display California native plants in natural settings. There are approximately 9.2 km (5.7 mi) of hiking trails within the garden. Mission Creek flows through the premises, and includes a rock dam which was constructed in 1806 by Native Americans (mainly Canaliños) under the direction of the Spanish padres of the adjacent Mission Santa Barbara.

In 2026 the Garden celebrated its 100 year anniversary.

== History ==
The Garden was founded in 1926 and designed by landscape architect Beatrix Farrand. By 1936 its focus had narrowed to plants native to the California Floristic Province (which includes a bit of southwestern Oregon and part of Baja California, as well as most of the state of California). The Garden became a Santa Barbara County Historical Landmark in 1983 (the dam on Mission Creek was already designated as a State Historic Landmark).

On May 6, 2009, part of the Botanic Garden was burned in the Jesusita Fire, which burned much of the front country of the Santa Ynez Mountains behind Santa Barbara. While garden displays have recovered from the devastating effects of the fire, several buildings were destroyed. One was the century-old Gane House, which contained the overstock for the garden library as well as many of the tools used for garden upkeep; the home of the garden's director; and a wooden deck overlooking the creek. In June 2015, construction of the John C. Pritzlaff Conservation Center began at the site of the old Gane House– the Center opened in 2016.

== Plant breeding ==
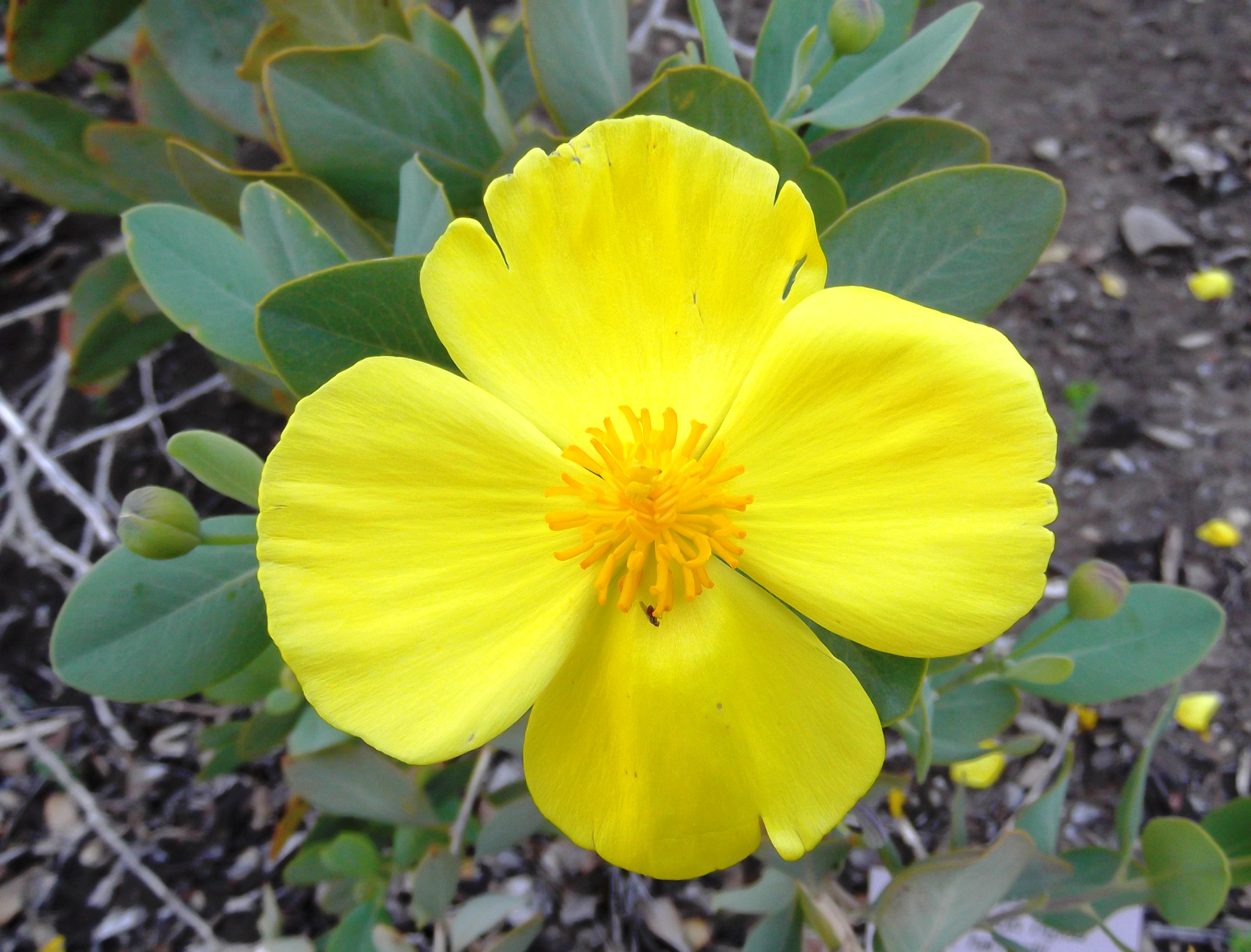
Channel Islands tree poppy (Dendromecon harfordii), is endemic to the Channel Islands of California.

The Garden has a plant breeding program. Plant introduction include Aesculus californica 'Canyon Pink', Agave shawii, Arctostaphylos 'White Lanterns', Arctostaphylos 'Canyon Blush', Arctostaphylos insularis 'Canyon Sparkles', Artemisia californica 'Canyon Gray', Berberis aquifolium 'Mission Canyon', Ceanothus 'Wheeler Canyon', Ceanothus 'Far Horizons', Ceanothus arboreus 'Powder Blue', Eriophyllum nevinii 'Canyon Silver', and Fremontodendron 'Dara's Gold'.

Additional breeding includes Heuchera 'Blushing Bells', Heuchera 'Canyon Belle', Heuchera 'Canyon Chimes', Heuchera 'Canyon Delight', Heuchera 'Canyon Duet', Heuchera 'Canyon Melody', Heuchera 'Canyon Pink', Heuchera 'Dainty Bells', Heuchera 'Pink Wave', Iris 'Canyon Snow', Lessingia filaginifolia 'Silver Carpet', Leymus condensatus 'Canyon Prince', Salvia 'Dara's Choice', Salvia cedrosensis 'Baja Blanca', Salvia leucophylla 'Amethyst Bluff', and Verbena lilacina 'De La Mina'.

== See also ==
- List of botanical gardens in the United States
- North American Plant Collections Consortium
