= South Coast Botanic Garden =

Botanic garden in L.A. County, California

Coordinates: 33°47′02″N 118°20′42″W

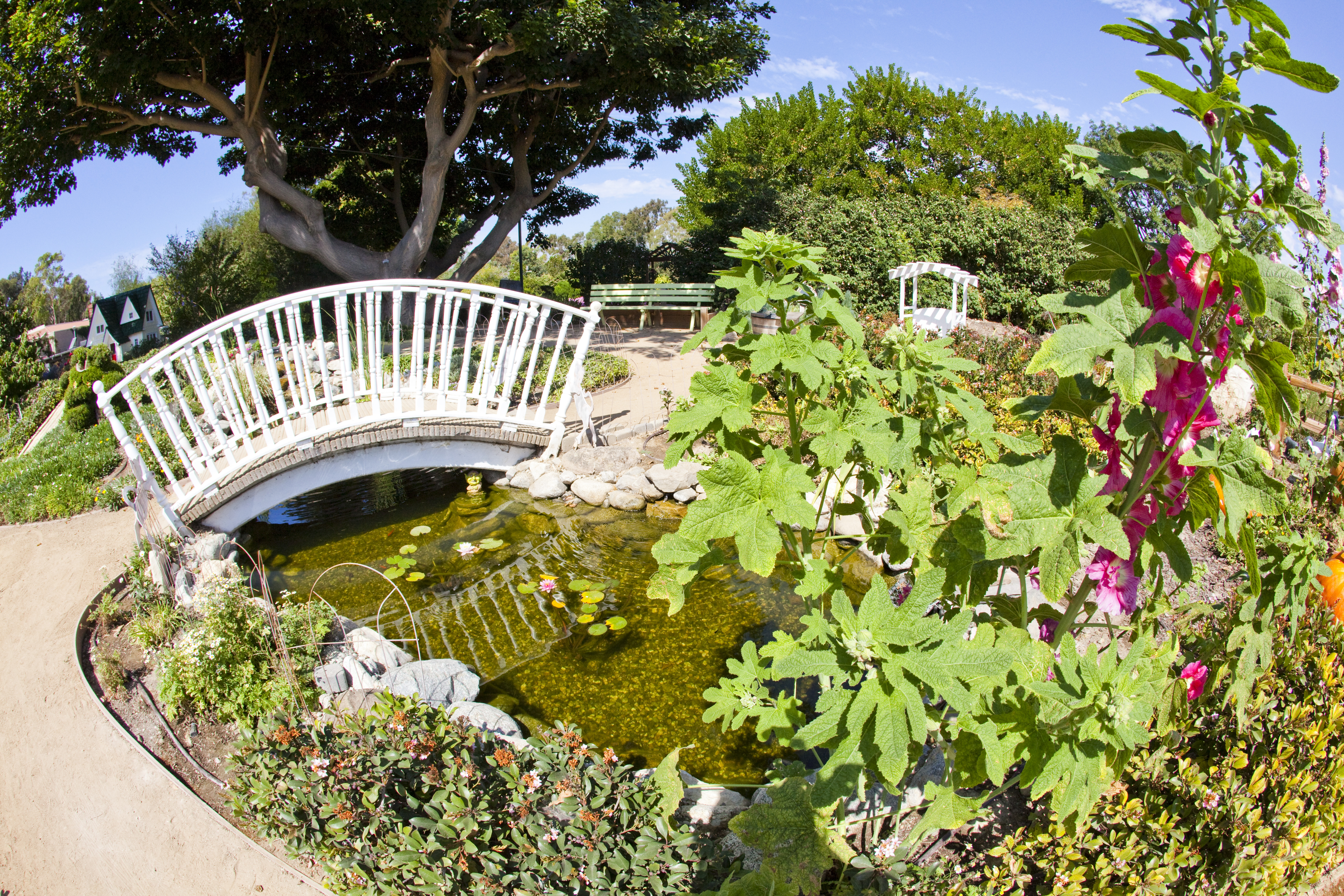
- Interactive map of South Coast Botanic Garden
- Website: southcoastbotanicgarden.org

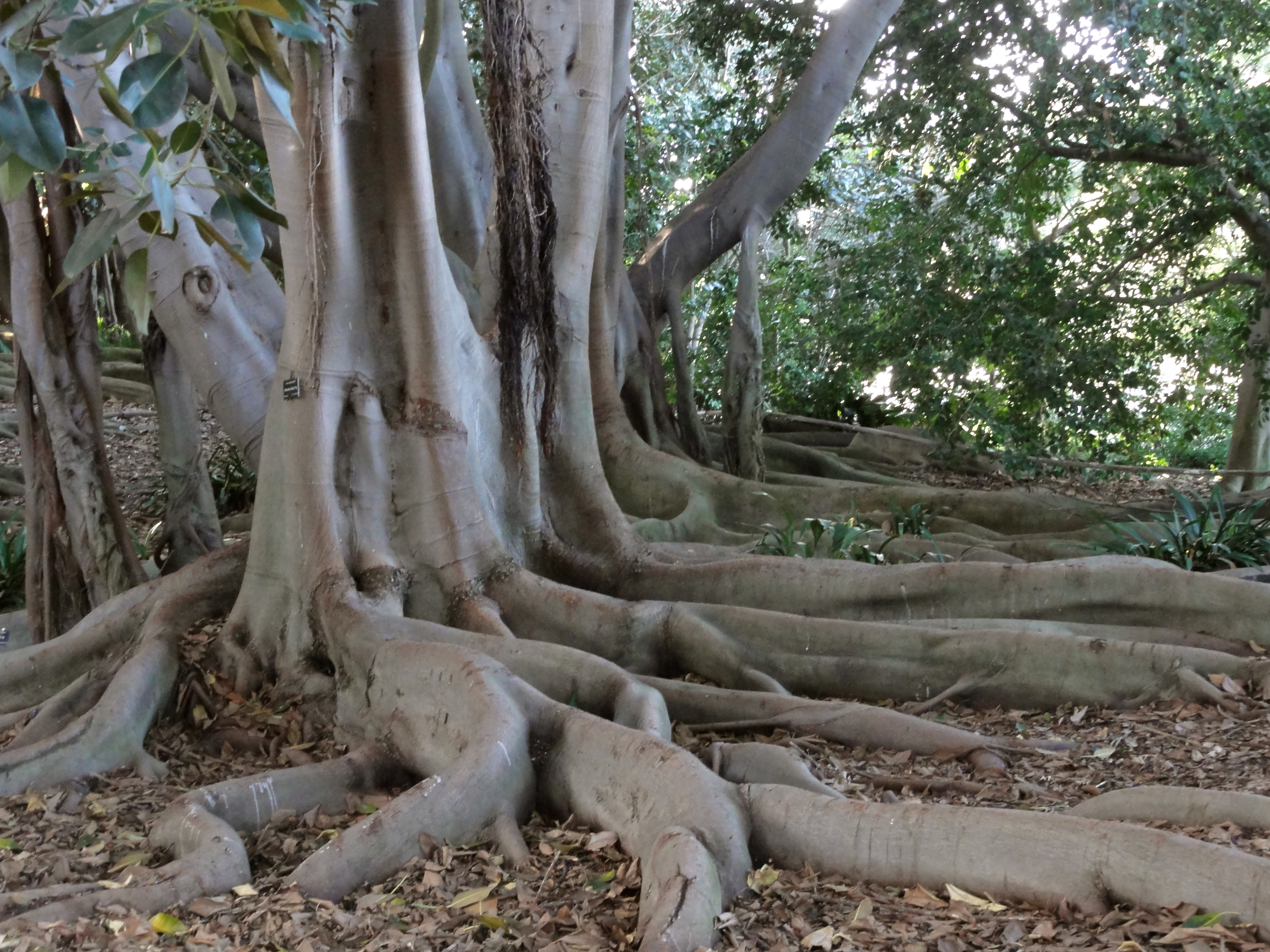
Buttress roots on a bay fig tree at the garden.

The South Coast Botanic Garden is an 87 acres (35 ha) botanical garden in the Palos Verdes Hills, in an unincorporated area of Los Angeles County, California, United States, about 10 miles (16 km) south of Los Angeles International Airport. It has over 150,000 landscaped plants and trees from approximately 140 families, 700 genera, and 2,000 different species, including flowering fruit trees, Coast Redwoods, Ginkgos and members of Pittosporum. It is particularly rich in plants from Australia and South Africa. Its gardens include the Water-wise Garden, Herb Garden, English Rose Garden, and Garden of the Senses. A small lake and stream bed attract various birds such as ducks, geese, coots, and herons. Over 300 species of birds have been recorded. The lake is currently empty.

The site was operated as an open pit mine from 1929 until 1956, producing over one million tons of crude diatomite. With declining production, the land was sold in 1957 to the County of Los Angeles for a sanitary landfill, which was in use until 1965. Starting in 1961, an experiment in land reclamation began when County Board of Supervisors approved a motion establishing the site as the South Coast Botanic Garden, which was landscaped over 3.5 million tons of refuse, in an example of land recycling. The Sanitation District in cooperation with other County agencies carried out initial planning, grading and contouring. Operating responsibilities were given to the Los Angeles County Department of Arboreta and Botanic Gardens. In April 1961, the first large-scale planting took place on completed fill overlooking Rolling Hills Road, with over 40,000 plants donated by individuals, nurseries and the County Arboretum.

The site presents unusual difficulties in gardening. First, its soil is composed almost entirely of diatomaceous earth. Second, because of the diverse nature and thickness of the fill, settling rates vary throughout the garden resulting in frequent irrigation system breakage. Third, heat is caused by decomposition of organic matter below the soil surface, and it is accompanied by the production of gases, primarily carbon dioxide and methane.

== See also ==
- List of botanical gardens in the United States
