= Lincoln Constance =

American botanist

Lincoln Constance (February 16, 1909 – June 11, 2001) was an American botanist and administrator at the University of California, Berkeley. Constance worked with Marion S. Cave for over twenty years to identify how many chromosomes different members of Hydrophyllaceae had. An expert on the parsley family, he was a fellow of the American Academy of Arts and Sciences and the California Academy of Sciences, and served as president of the American Society of Plant Taxonomists, the California Botanical Society and the Botanical Society of America.

The standard author abbreviation Constance is used to indicate this person as the author when citing a botanical name.
