= Mildred E. Mathias =

American botanist and professor (1906–1995)

Mildred Esther Mathias (September 19, 1906 – February 16, 1995) was an American botanist and professor.

She was a professor at UCLA from 1962 until 1974. She also served as president of the American Society for Plant Taxonomists and the Botanical Society of America.

== Early career ==
Mathias was born in Sappington, Missouri on September 19, 1906. Beginning her college career in the 1920s, Mathias originally had planned to study mathematics, but she instead studied botany, getting her bachelor's, master's degree and PhD at Washington University in St. Louis by the age of 22.

She married Gerald Hassler, a PhD in physics, in Philadelphia in August 1930. From 1932 to 1936, Mathias was a research associate at the New York Botanical Garden and then at Berkeley by 1937 with Dr. Lincoln Constance for carrot studies. Her family moved to southern California by 1944.

== Career ==
She studied, classified, and led groups to discover plants across the world, from Southeastern Asia to Australia, to South-Central Africa, to the Amazons, to the western United States, helping popularize "ecotourism". She discovered over 100 types of Umbelliferae. In 1954, The genus Mathiasella, a north-eastern Mexico umbellifer, was named in her honor.

Her first trip abroad as a retired professor was to Costa Rica in 1974 and led 53 trips since and to over 30 countries. She published over 200 articles and books about her findings.

She placed a strong emphasis on education for the general public, both directing the UCLA botanical garden (which was renamed the Mildred E. Mathias Botanical Garden in her honor) and hosting a weekly television show via NBC on gardening with co-host Dr. William Stewart called "The Wonderful World of Ornamentals".

Mathias helped establish the University of California Natural Reserve System (Natural Reserve System) a system of undisturbed California habitats that was acquired and managed by the University of California for university teaching and research. She promoted conservation in Costa Rica, creating the Organization for Tropical studies, helping with preservation of Costa Rican lands.

== Awards ==
- California Conservation Council Merit Award, 1962
- UCLA Medical Auxiliary Woman of Science Award, 1963
- Los Angeles Times Woman of the Year, 1964
- Nature Conservancy National Award, 1964
- Pacific Coast Nurseryman Award for Outstanding Achievement in Horticulture, 1967
- Merit Award from the Botanical Society of America, 1973
- Award of Merit by the American Association of Botanical Gardens and Arboreta, 1976
- Liberty Hyde Bailey Medal from the American Horticulture Society, 1980
- Medal of Honor from the Garden Club of America for outstanding horticulturist who has made a contribution in the fields of research and education, 1982
- Honorary Fellow of the Association for Tropical Biology and Conservation, 1986
- Charles Lawrence Hutchinson Medal of the Chicago Horticultural Society, 1988
- Honorary Trustee of the Missouri Botanical Garden, 1989
- UCLA Emeritus Professor of the Year, 1990
- Distinguished Economic Botanist by the Society of Economic Botany, 1993

== Leadership ==
- UCLA: Herbarium Botanist under Carl Epling (1947), Plant Taxonomy Lecturer (1951), Assistant Professor in Botany Department, Vice Chair (1955), Director of UCLA Botanical Garden (1956)
- Helped establish the UC Natural Land and Water Reserves System (Natural Reserve System), 1960s
- First Female President of American Society of Plant Taxonomists, 1964
- President of Organization for Tropical Studies, 1969-1970
- First executive director of the Association of American Botanical Gardens and Arboreta: created a certification program in horticulture that linked universities with hands-on training at a network of horticultural gardens, 1977-1981
- President of Botanical Society of America, 1984

== Writing ==
- Mathias, Mildred E. "Studies on the Umbelliferae. I." in Annals of the Missouri Botanical Garden. St. Louis: Missouri Botanical Garden Press (1928) 15: 91–108.
- Mathias, Mildred E. "Studies on the Umbelliferae. II." in Annals of the Missouri Botanical Garden. St. Louis: Missouri Botanical Garden Press (1929) 16: 393- 398.
- Mathias, Mildred E. "Studies on the Umbelliferae. III." A Monograph of Cymopterus Including A Critical Study of Related Genera" in Annals of the Missouri Botanical Garden. St. Louis: Missouri Botanical Garden Press (1930). 17: 213- 476.
- Mathias, Mildred E. "Studies on the Umbelliferae. IV." in Annals of the Missouri Botanical Garden. St. Louis: Missouri Botanical Garden Press (1932). 19: 497- 498.
- Hinton, George B.; Mathias, Mildred E.; Constance, Lincoln "Herbarium of George B. Hinton, Umbelliferae" in Plant Lists, Mexico. (1931- 1941).
- Mathias, Mildred E. "A Revision of the Genus Lomatium" in Annals of the Missouri Botanical Garden. St. Louis: Missouri Botanical Garden Press (1938). 25: 225–297.
- Mathias, Mildred E. and Constance, Lincoln "A SYNOPSIS OF THE AMERICAN SPECIES OF CICUTA" in: Madroño: a West American journal of botany. Berkeley, California Botanical Society (1942). 6: 145- 151.
- Mathias, Mildred E. and Constance, Lincoln "A NEW SPECIES OF TAUSCHIA FROM THE STATE OF WASHINGTON" in Madroño: a West American journal of botany. Berkeley, California Botanical Society (1943). 7: 65- 67.
- Raven, Peter H. and Mathias, Mildred E. "SANICULA DESERTICOLA, AN ENDEMIC OF BAJA CALIFORNIA" in: Madroño: a West American journal of botany. Berkeley, California Botanical Society (1960). 15: 193- 197.
- Mathias, Mildred E. "Distribution Patterns of Certain Umbelliferae" in Annals of the Missouri Botanical Garden. St. Louis: Missouri Botanical Garden Press (1965). 52: 387–398.
- Mathias, Mildred E.; Constance, Lincoln; Theobald, William L "TWO NEW SPECIES OF UMBELLIFERAE FROM THE SOUTHWESTERN UNITED STATES" in: Madroño: a West American journal of botany. Berkeley, California Botanical Society (1969). 20: 214- 219.
- Mathias, Mildred E. and Constance, Lincoln "NEW AND RECONSIDERED MEXICAN UMBELLIFERAE" in: Contributions from the University of Michigan Herbarium. Ann Arbor :University Herbarium, University of Michigan (1977). 24: 78–83.
- Mathias, Mildred E. and Constance, Lincoln "A NEW SPECIES OF OREOMYRRHS (UMBELLIFERAE, APIACEAE) FROM NEW GUINEA)" in: Journal of the Arnold Arboretum. Cambridge, Mass (1977). 58: 190–192.
- Mathias, Mildred E. "Color for the Landscape: Flowering Plants for Subtropical Climates." (1976).
- Mathias, Mildred E. "Flowering Plants in the Landscape." University of California Press. (1985).
