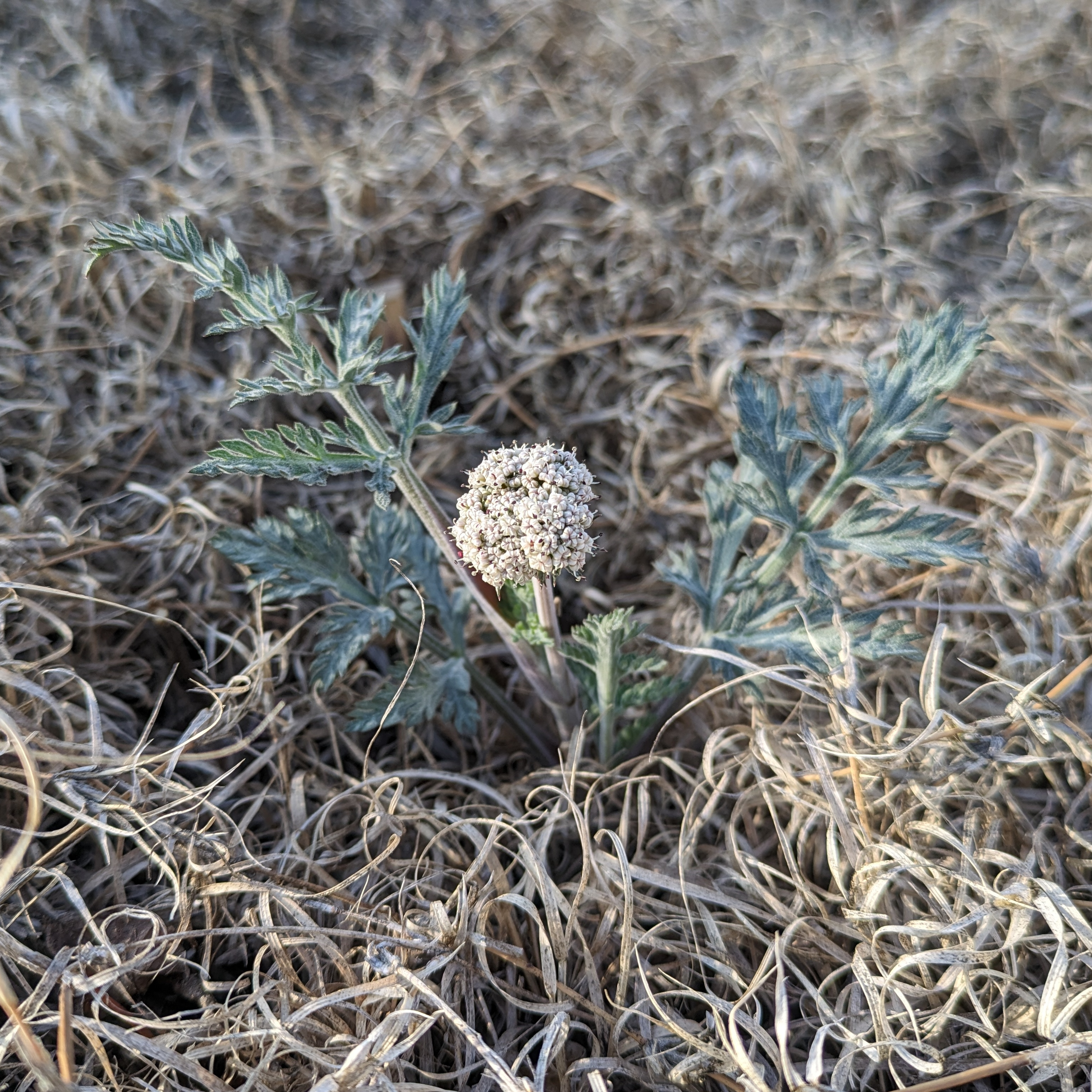
- Lomatium orientale

Conservation status
- Secure (NatureServe)

Scientific classification
- Kingdom: Plantae
- Clade: Tracheophytes
- Clade: Angiosperms
- Clade: Eudicots
- Clade: Asterids
- Order: Apiales
- Family: Apiaceae
- Genus: Lomatium
- Species: L. orientale

Binomial name
- Lomatium orientale J.M.Coult. & Rose

Synonyms
- Cogswellia orientalis (J.M.Coult. & Rose) M.E.Jones; Peucedanum orientale (J.M.Coult. & Rose) Blank.

= Lomatium orientale =

Plant species in the parsley family

Lomatium orientale, commonly known as salt-and-pepper, oriental desert parsley, or Northern Idaho biscuitroot, is a small spring blooming ephemeral plant. It grows in open habitats from the plains to foothills in western North America. It is known as one of the earliest blooming native flowers in its habitat.

== Description ==
Lomatium orientale can be hard to distinguish from other plants in either Lomatium or in Cymopterus. Plants it may be confused with include Cymopterus montanus, Cymopterus glomeratus, and Lomatium nevadense. It is a fully herbaceous perennial plant with no woody tissue like all plants in Lomatium. Overall the plants are 10–40 cm in size and almost all to of its leaves arising from the base of the plant (basal leaves). L. orientale has a long taproot that can be slender or thick. The plants grow from early spring until the start of summer, April through June in Colorado.

Its leaves are pinnate dissected, each leaf being completely divided all the way down to the central vein with wide spacing of the leaflets near the base and closer together and smaller near the tip. Each leaflet is also partially dissected making it a tripinnate leaf. The leaves have a soft texture with fine downy hairs covering their surface and are 3–8 cm long. The leaves are most often triangular in outline with an overall appearance resembling lace or a fern with a pale blue-green color. Plants with shinier, greener, and more narrow leaves may instead be Cymopterus glomeratus. Most of the leaves are basal, the stems coming directly from the crown of the plant, but sometimes there will be leaves associated with the flowering stem with a base that wraps completely around the flowering stem (cauline leaves wholly sheathing).

=== Flowers ===
The many flowers of Lomatium orientale grow together in a rounded head called an umbel. This umbrella shaped inflorescence is a compound umbel because each is formed out of three to fifteen smaller umbels called umbelets. Each umbelet will have about 20 tiny flowers. The small stems that support the flower are 1.2–5.5 cm long. Each flower has five tiny petals, which are white to pinkish in color with prominent dark red anthers. The lack of red anthers in on the flowers of Cymopterus montanus help to distinguish between them. The rounded ovary under the flower is glabrous, free of hairs. This is an important characteristic to distinguish it from the very similar species such as Lomatium nevadense where their range overlaps New Mexico, Utah, or Arizona.

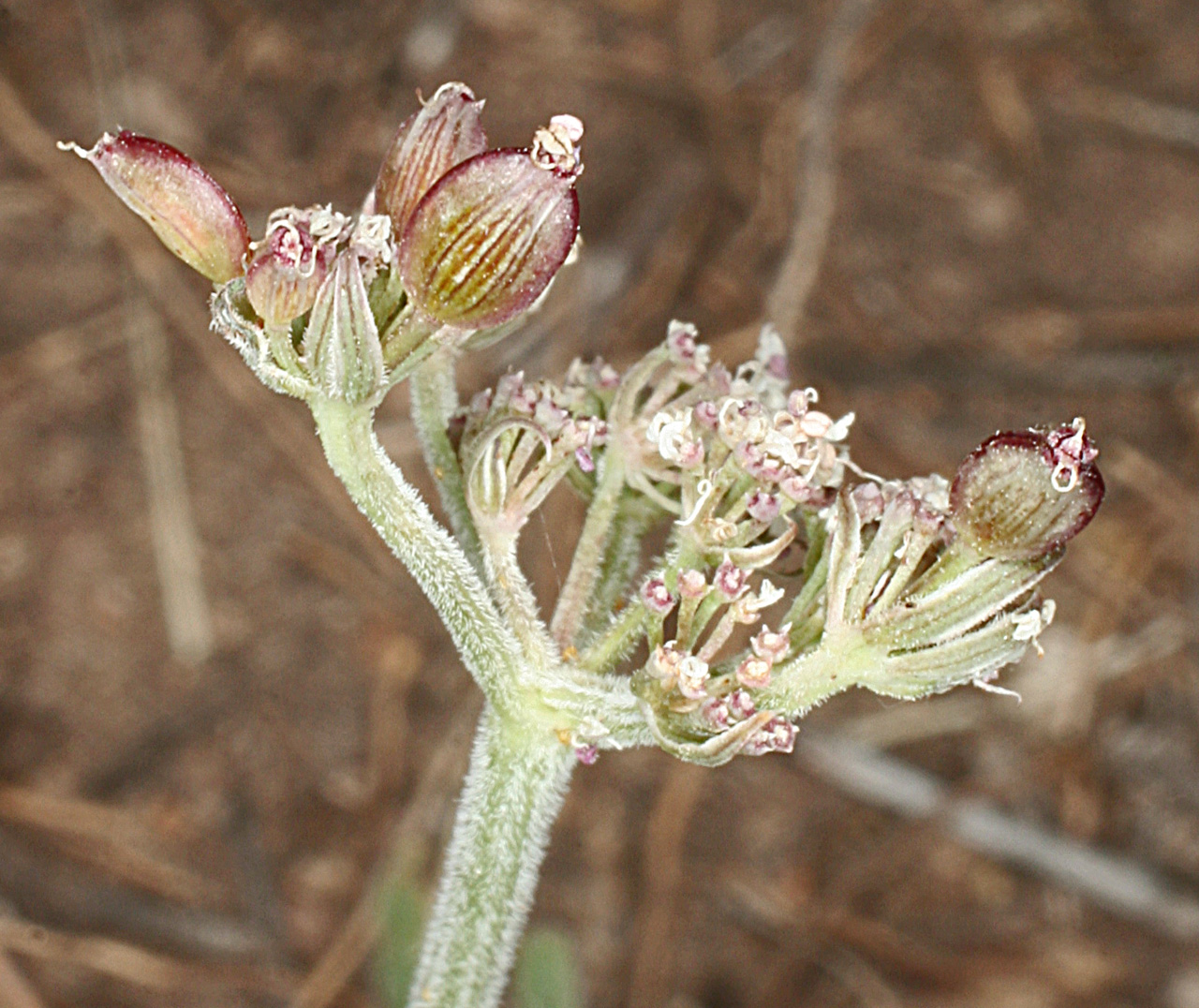
Seeds of Lomatium orientale, photographed near the Gilla wilderness

The fruits are 5–10 mm long and 3–7 mm wide, with papery wings 0.5–1 mm on the sides. Like the ovary, the fruits are hairless. When fully ripe they are light and dry.

== Taxonomy ==
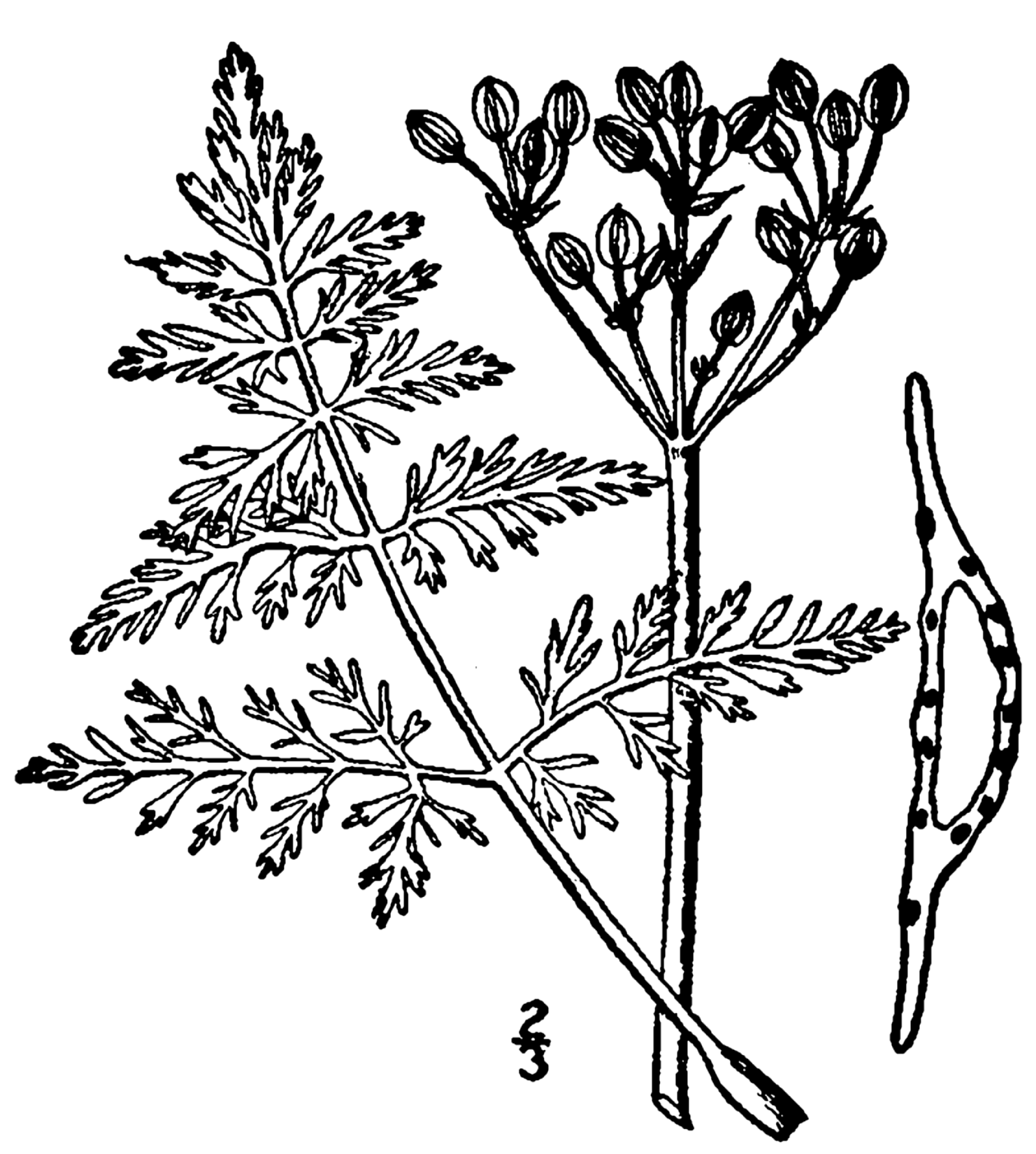
Lomatium orientale, An illustrated flora of the northern United States, Canada and the British Possessions, 1913

The type specimen of Lomatium orientale was collected by E. Bethel on plains near Denver, Colorado in 1895. The collected specimen held in the Smithsonian National Museum of Natural History Department of Botany Collections as of 2023, is listed as "alleged type specimen examined".

It was first scientifically described in Contributions from the United States National Herbarium in 1900 by John Merle Coulter and Joseph Nelson Rose. In 1905 it was erroneously described as Peucedanum orientale, an illegal name as a different species by that name was described in 1834. An alternate classification as Cogswellia orientalis was published by Marcus E. Jones in Contributions to Western Botany in 1908 as part of an argument against the creation of the genus Lomatium. Instead he proposed that Cogswellia named by Kurt Sprengel should be the accepted name for the genus. This argument was initially accepted, including by Coulter and Rose. However, the argument that Lomatium was synonymous to the earlier Lomatia was held to be in error by James Francis Macbride in an article published in 1918. Subsequent articles about the genus tended to use Lomatium more often. Though there is disagreement about the classification of species in Lomatium or in Cymopterus, as of 2025 Lomatium orientale is used as the species name by Plants of the World Online (POWO), World Flora Online (WFO), and the USDA Natural Resources Conservation Service PLANTS database (PLANTS).

=== Names ===
The species name, orientale, is Botanical Latin meaning "eastern". It is known by the common names salt-and-pepper, salt and pepper, or salt and pepper biscuitroot, for the resemblance of its flowers to a mixture of salt and pepper. In Canada it is primarily known as oriental desert-parsley in English and this name is also occasionally used in the United States. In Canada it is also called eastern desert-parsley, eastern cous, eastern lomatium, and white-flowered desert-parsley. It is also known as northern Idaho biscuitroot in both in the United States and Canada.

It is also simply called wild parsley, however this name is applied to many other species of umbellifers with finely-divided leaves.

In the Lakota language it is called šahíyela tȟathíŋpsiŋla meaning "Cheyenne's turnip".

== Habitat and distribution ==
Lomatium orientale grows in open habitats such as hillsides, rocky slopes, and sagebrush meadows. It can be found on both plains and in lower foothills. In mountain habitats it shows a moderate preference for seasonally moist slopes.

Lomatium orientale is distributed across 17 US states and two Canadian provinces. Most of the reported populations are on the great plains portions of Montana, North Dakota, South Dakota, Minnesota, Nebraska, Wyoming, Kansas, and Colorado. There is an isolated population in southern New Mexico and also populations in small areas of the states of Iowa, Oklahoma, and Texas. In addition there are records of plants being observed in Washington state, Idaho, Utah, Arizona, Missouri, Manitoba, and Saskatchewan with no precise location recorded.

== Ecology ==
The flowers are visited by the Sheridan's green hairstreak butterfly (Callophrys sheridanii) and the Colorado white butterfly (Pontia sisymbrii).

== Cultivation ==
Though hardy and early blooming salt-and-pepper flowers are not commonly grown in gardens. Its flowers are not showy and both seeds and plants are rarely available in the horticulture trade. It is recommended by the City of Fort Collins for its very low water usage and for its value as a food source for insects.

== Traditional uses ==
The Cheyenne people made use of an infusion of the roots and leaves for bowel pain, either fresh or dried roots. The Navajo people would sometimes rub the roots in hot ash to remove the strong flavor of the plant and then ate them raw or baked, but it was not a staple food source.
