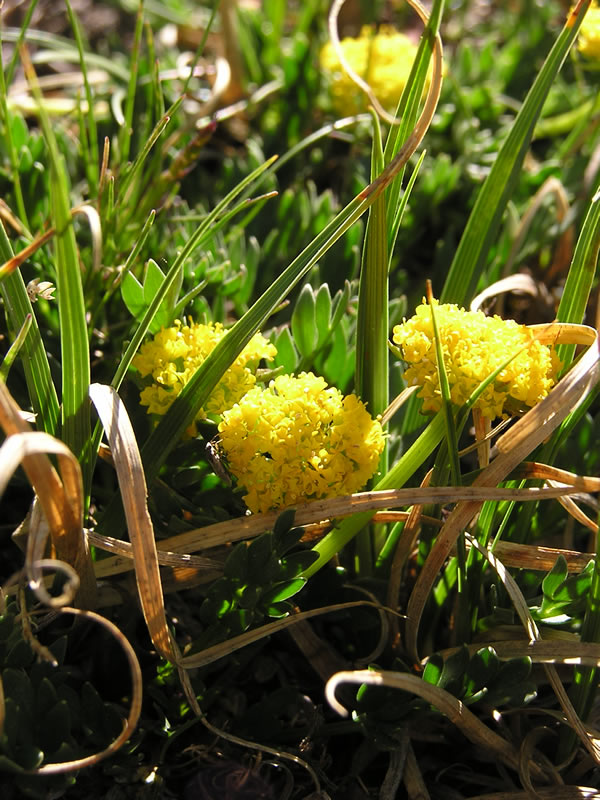
- Oreoxis humilis

Scientific classification
- Kingdom: Plantae
- Clade: Tracheophytes
- Clade: Angiosperms
- Clade: Eudicots
- Clade: Asterids
- Order: Apiales
- Family: Apiaceae
- Tribe: Selineae
- Genus: Oreoxis; Raf.

Species
- Oreoxis bakeri J.M.Coult. & Rose; Oreoxis humilis Raf.

= Oreoxis =

Genus of flowering plants

Oreoxis, also known as alpine parsley, is a genus of flowering plants in the carrot family. It includes two species native to subalpine regions of Colorado, New Mexico, and Utah in the west-central United States.

- Oreoxis bakeri J.M.Coult. & Rose – Colorado, northern New Mexico, and Utah
- Oreoxis humilis Raf. – central Colorado (Pikes Peak area)

== Taxonomy ==
Oreoxis was given its scientific name in 1830 by Constantine Samuel Rafinesque with one species, Oreoxis humilis. The second accepted species was scientifically described and named Oreoxis bakeri in 1900 by John Merle Coulter and Joseph Nelson Rose in 1900.

After studying the genus Cymopterus Marcus E. Jones proposed merging Orexis as a section in 1908. However, other botanists such as Mildred E. Mathias retained it as an accepted genus in 1930. The genus was also retained by Stanley Larson Welsh and his coauthors in their book Utah Flora published in 1987. However, Arthur Cronquist and his collaborators on the Intermountain Flora Volume Three, Part A again proposed that it be included in Cymopterus in 1997. Similarly Kenneth D. Heil and his coauthors choose to publish with Oreoxis listed as a synonym in 2013. As of 2025 Oreoxis is considered an accepted genus according to Plants of the World Online and the USDA Natural Resources Conservation Service plants database.

There are three other species previously placed in the genus:

- Oreoxis alpina (A.Gray) J.M.Coult. & Rose – 1900 synonym of Cymopterus alpinus.
- Oreoxis macdougalii (J.M.Coult. & Rose) Rydb. – 1913 synonym of Cymopterus macdougalii
- Oreoxis trotteri S.L.Welsh & Goodrich – 1985 synonym of Cymopterus trotteri

=== Names ===
Oreoxis is known by the common name of alpine parsley and the genus name is also used as common name.
