= Cymopterus goodrichii =

Conservation status
- Critically Imperiled (NatureServe)

Scientific classification
- Kingdom: Plantae
- Clade: Embryophytes
- Clade: Tracheophytes
- Clade: Angiosperms
- Clade: Eudicots
- Clade: Asterids
- Order: Apiales
- Family: Apiaceae
- Genus: Cymopterus
- Species: C. goodrichii

Binomial name
- Cymopterus goodrichii S.L.Welsh & Neese

Species of flowering plant

Cymopterus goodrichii is a rare species of flowering plant in the carrot family known by the common name Toiyabe springparsley. It is endemic to Nevada in the United States, where it occurs in the Toiyabe and West Humboldt Ranges.

This perennial herb grows up to 15 or 20 centimeters tall from a taproot and underground root crown. There is a small rosette of leaves with intricately divided blades 1 or 2 centimeters long. The inflorescence arises on a purple flower stalk directly from the ground. It is a small umbel about a centimeter wide containing white or purple flowers. The fruit is 5 to 8 millimeters long and has broad wings.

This plant grows in bare scree of slate and limestone in subalpine and alpine climates. Other plants in the habitat include spreading wheatgrass (Agropyron scribneri), Michaux's wormwood (Artemisia michuaxiana), broadkeel milkvetch (Astragalus platytropis), dwarf alpine hawksbeard (Crepis nana), desert draba (Draba arida), dwarf mountain fleabane (Erigeron compositus), ballhead ipomopsis (Ipomopsis congesta), granite prickly phlox (Linanthus pungens), spike fescue (Leucopoa kingii), sky pilot (Polemonium viscosum), wax currant (Ribes cereum), and mountain gooseberry (Ribes montigenum).
