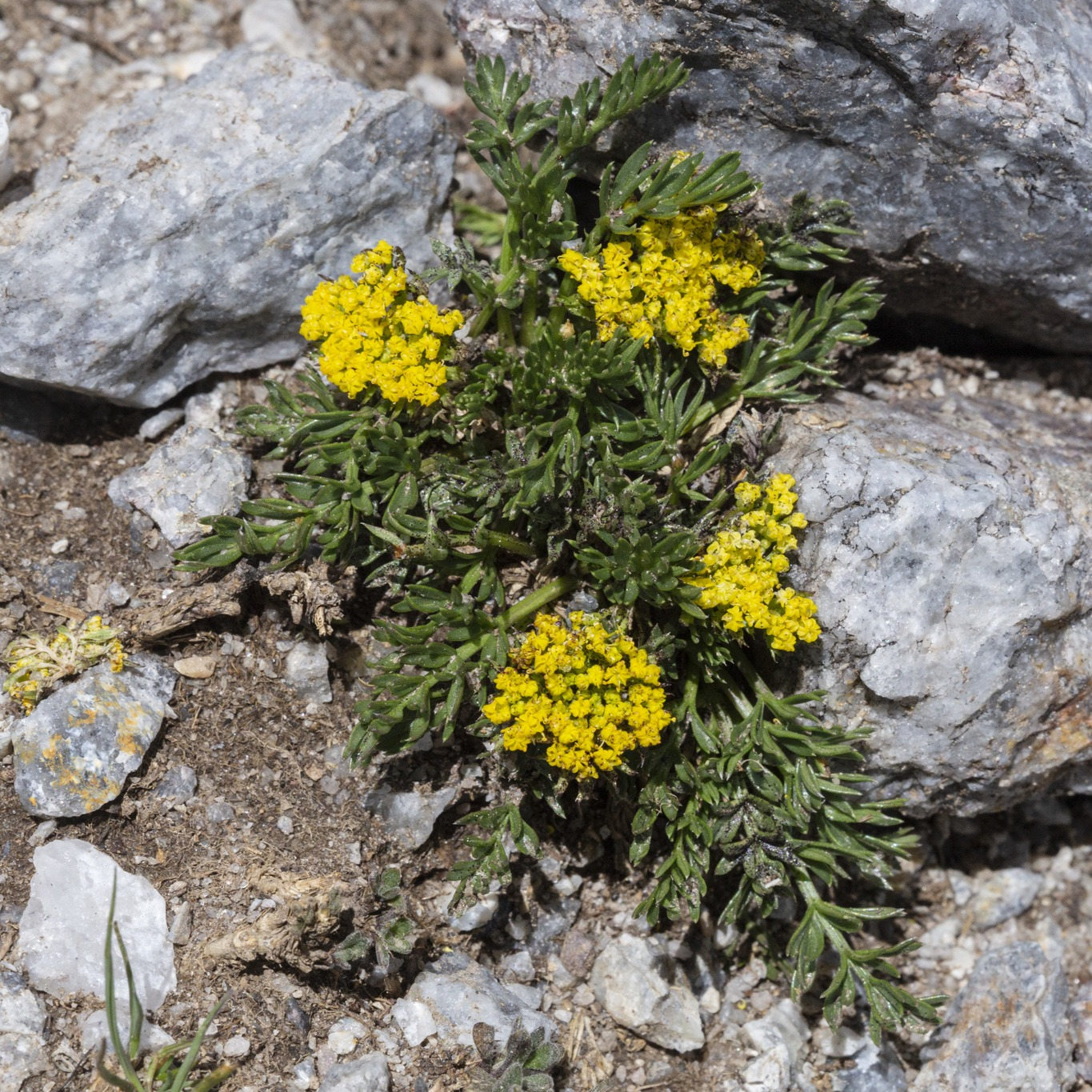
- In Carson National Forest, New Mexico

Conservation status
- Vulnerable (NatureServe)

Scientific classification
- Kingdom: Plantae
- Clade: Tracheophytes
- Clade: Angiosperms
- Clade: Eudicots
- Clade: Asterids
- Order: Apiales
- Family: Apiaceae
- Genus: Oreoxis
- Species: O. bakeri

Binomial name
- Oreoxis bakeri J.M.Coult. & Rose

Synonyms
- Cymopterus bakeri (J.M.Coult. & Rose) M.E.Jones

= Oreoxis bakeri =

Plant species in the parsley family

Oreoxis bakeri, commonly known as Baker's alpineparsley, is a flowering plant in the carrot family from the western United States.

== Description ==
Baker's alpineparsley is a small plant growing to just 1 to 14 centimeters tall. It does not have stems and grows more or less Caespitose, like a tuft of grass. The top of its large taproot has a diameter of 0.2 to 1 cm. The leaves and inflorescences grow from a caudex that is covered in persistent leaf bases. All parts of the plant are usually hairless, but can have rough hairs at the base of the umbel and along its rays.

The basal leaves are from 1 to 5 cm long, excluding the petioles, the leaf stems, and are 0.5–3 cm wide. They are mostly bipinnate, divided twice into leaflets, though they are sometimes pinnate with the leaflets only partly divided. There are three to seven pairs of primary leaflets attached on opposite sides of the main vein.

The yellow flowers are found in one to four umbels, each about 1–2 cm wide.

== Taxonomy ==
Oreoxis bakeri was scientifically described and named by John Merle Coulter and Joseph Nelson Rose in 1900. Along with Oreoxis humilis, it is one of two species in the genus Oreoxis. This is further classified as part of the family Apiaceae. It has no subspecies, but has one synonym from 1908 when it was reclassified as part of the genus Cymopterus by Marcus E. Jones. This classification was used by botanist Kenneth D. Heil and his collaborators in their Flora of the Four Corners Region in 2013 and by Arthur Cronquist and coauthors in the Intermountain Flora volume Three, Part A in 1997. On the other hand, other botanists such as Stanley Larson Welsh and his coauthors regarded it as valid in 1987, when publishing their Utah Flora. Oreoxis bakeri is the accepted name according to Plants of the World Online.

=== Names ===
Oreoxis bakeri was named for the botanist Charles Fuller Baker, who also collected the type specimen from mountains near Pagosa Peak in Colorado on 23 August 1899. It is known by the common names Baker's alpineparsley and Baker's oreoxis.

== Range and habitat ==
Baker's alpineparsley grows in three western US states, Colorado, New Mexico, and Utah. It is most commonly found in Colorado and Utah. It grows in 20 counties in southwestern Colorado. In New Mexico it is reported to grow in four north-central counties, Taos, Mora, Santa Fe, and San Miguel. In Utah it only grows in the La Sal Mountains in the southeast of the state.

It grows in open habitats, primary above timberline in the mountains. It is often found on rocky ridges and slopes.

=== Conservation ===
In 2018 the conservation organization NatureServe evaluated Baker's alpineparsley and rated it as vulnerable at the global level (G3). They similarly evaluated it as vulnerable (S3) in Colorado, but rated it critically imperiled in Utah (S1). A primary threat to the species are the introduced mountain goats in the La Sal Mountains that are damaging the plants and the alpine habitat. The species is also threatened by climate change.
