= Astragalus leucolobus =

Conservation status
- Vulnerable (IUCN 3.1)

Scientific classification
- Kingdom: Plantae
- Clade: Tracheophytes
- Clade: Angiosperms
- Clade: Eudicots
- Clade: Rosids
- Order: Fabales
- Family: Fabaceae
- Subfamily: Faboideae
- Genus: Astragalus
- Species: A. leucolobus

Binomial name
- Astragalus leucolobus S.Wats. ex M.E.Jones

Species of legume

Astragalus leucolobus is a species of milkvetch known by the common names Bear Valley milkvetch and Bear Valley woollypod.

== Distribution and habitat ==
It is endemic to the mountain ranges of southern California, where it is known from scattered occurrences in the San Gabriel, San Bernardino, and San Jacinto Mountains. It is a plant of mountain forest, woodland, and pebble plain.

== Description ==
This is a small perennial herb forming a low clump of spreading stems and woolly leaves. The stems are less than 7 centimeters in length and bear leaves made up of many oval-shaped, pointed leaflets.

An inflorescence of 5 to 13 flowers rises above the clump of herbage. Each flower is pinkish purple and is between one and two centimeters long. The fruit is a densely woolly white legume pod with a bent tip.
