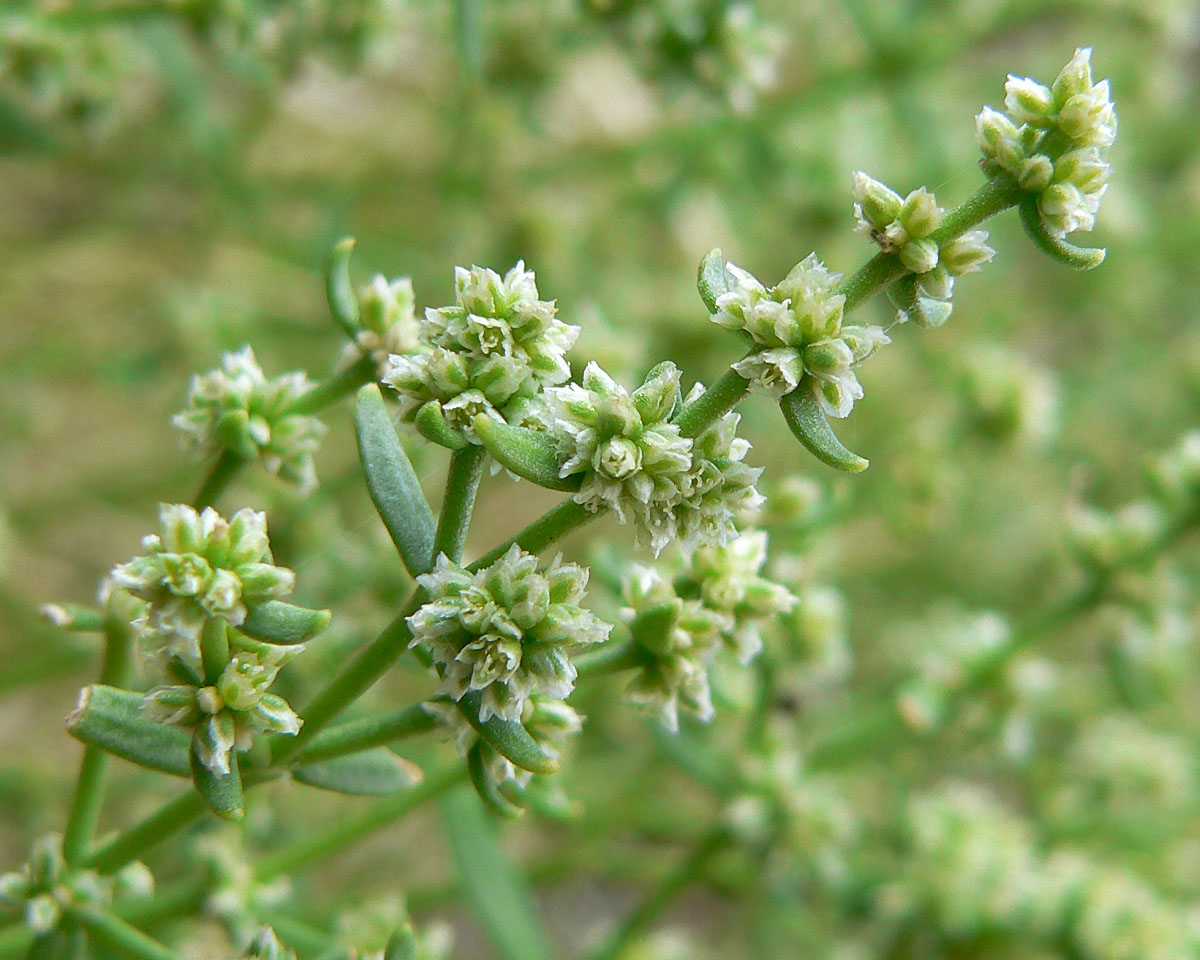
- Scopulophila rixfordii

Scientific classification
- Kingdom: Plantae
- Clade: Tracheophytes
- Clade: Angiosperms
- Clade: Eudicots
- Order: Caryophyllales
- Family: Caryophyllaceae
- Genus: Scopulophila; M.E.Jones (1908)

Species
- 2, see text

Synonyms
- Eremolithia Jeps. (1915)

= Scopulophila =

Genus of flowering plants

Scopulophila is a small genus of flowering plants in the pink family. Rockwort is a common name for plants in this genus.

== Species ==
- Scopulophila parryi - native to Mexico
- Scopulophila rixfordii - native to California and Nevada
