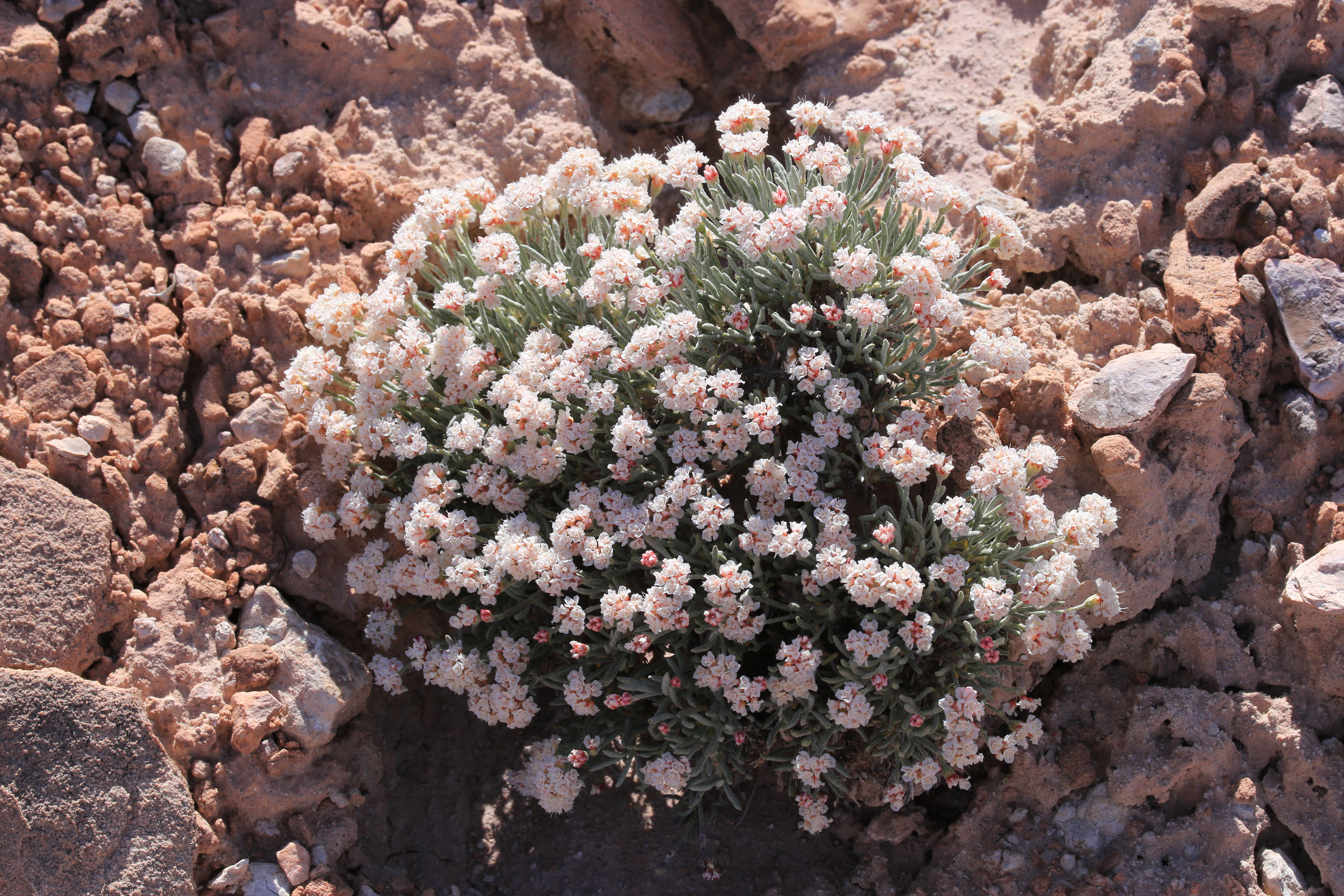
- Growing in Wayne County, Utah

Conservation status
- Vulnerable (NatureServe)

Scientific classification
- Kingdom: Plantae
- Clade: Embryophytes
- Clade: Tracheophytes
- Clade: Angiosperms
- Clade: Eudicots
- Order: Caryophyllales
- Family: Polygonaceae
- Genus: Eriogonum
- Species: E. bicolor

Binomial name
- Eriogonum bicolor M.E.Jones

Synonyms
- Eriogonum microtheca subsp. bicolor

= Eriogonum bicolor =

Species of flowering plant

Eriogonum bicolor, the pretty buckwheat, is a species of flowering plant in the buckwheat family.

== Description ==
E. bicolor is a perennial herbaceous shrub which grows up to 10 cm (4 in) tall and 30 cm (12 in) across. The pink and white flowers are approximately .75 cm (0.30 in) wide and occur between April and July.

== Taxonomy ==
The botanist Marcus E. Jones scientifically described this species in the Eriogonum in 1893, naming it Eriogonum bicolor. The botanist Susan Gabriella Stokes proposed classifying it as a subspecies of Eriogonum microtheca in 1936, but this has not been accepted. Together with its genus it is part of the Polygonaceae family.

== Range ==
This shrub is found in central Utah and far western Colorado.

== Environment ==
It grows in silty, sandy or heavy clay washes, flats and slopes, saltbush and blackbrush communities, juniper or pinyon-juniper woodlands between the altitudes of 1,300 m (4,265 ft) and 2,300 m (7,546 ft).
