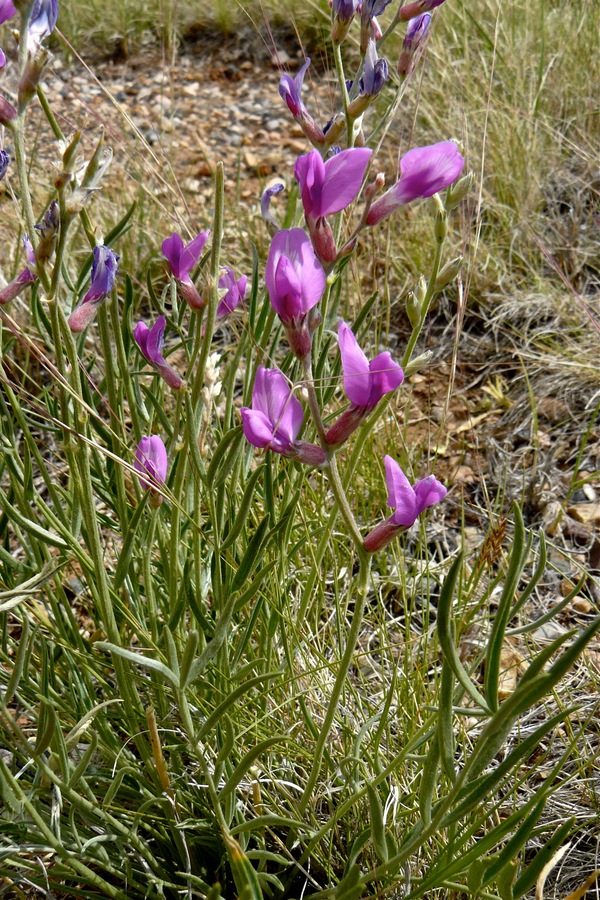

Conservation status
- Vulnerable (NatureServe)

Scientific classification
- Kingdom: Plantae
- Clade: Tracheophytes
- Clade: Angiosperms
- Clade: Eudicots
- Clade: Rosids
- Order: Fabales
- Family: Fabaceae
- Subfamily: Faboideae
- Genus: Astragalus
- Species: A. woodruffii

Binomial name
- Astragalus woodruffii M.E.Jones

Synonyms
- Homalobus woodruffii (M.E.Jones)

= Astragalus woodruffii =

Species of plant

Astragalus woodruffii, also known as Woodruff's milkvetch, is a species of Milkvetch in the family Fabaceae. It is native to south central Utah.

== Distribution and habitat ==
It is most commonly found in the month of May, being found in that month around 74% of the time. It is commonly found in the elevations of between 4,000-6,000 feet.
