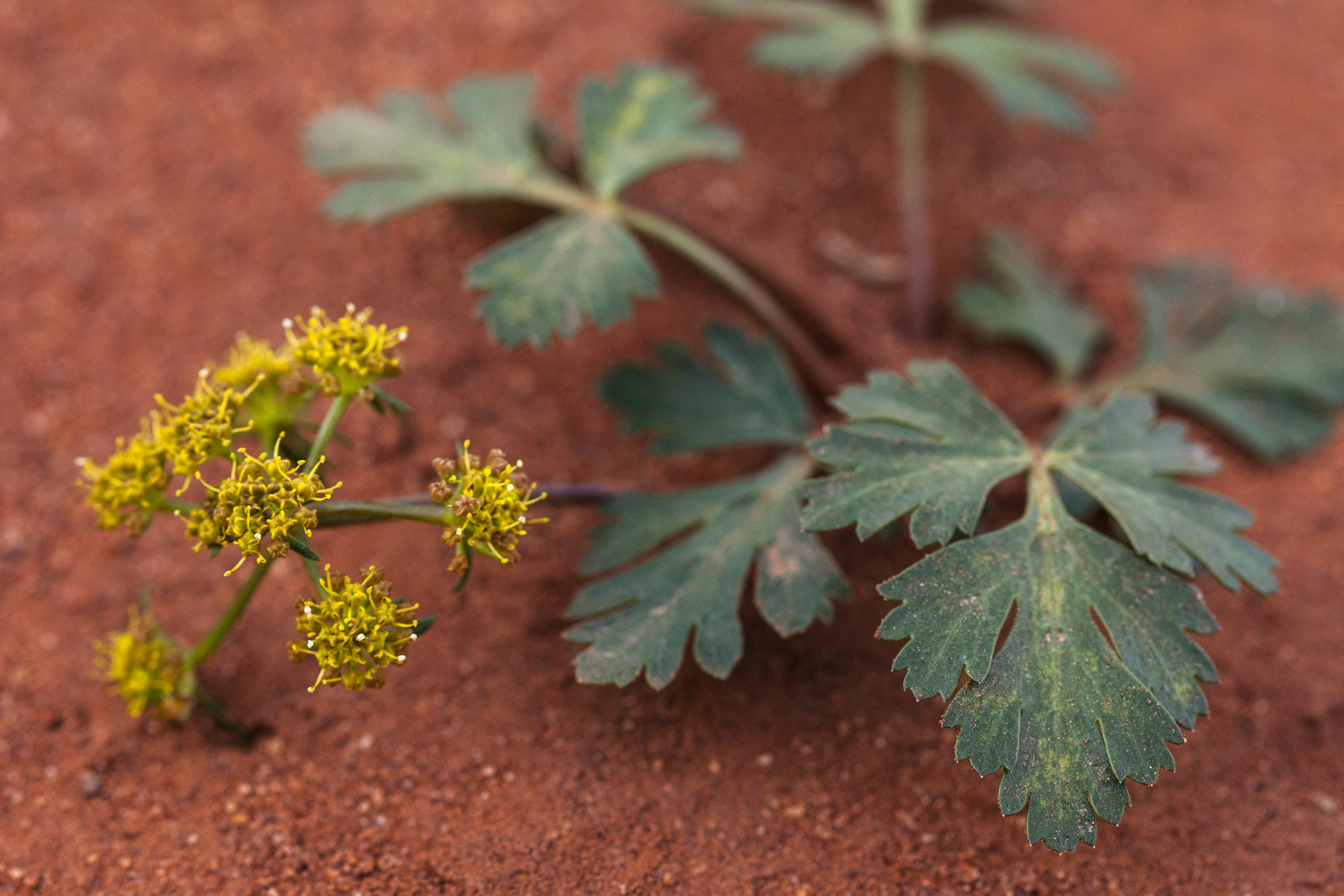
- Cymopterus newberryi

Scientific classification
- Kingdom: Plantae
- Clade: Tracheophytes
- Clade: Angiosperms
- Clade: Eudicots
- Clade: Asterids
- Order: Apiales
- Family: Apiaceae
- Subfamily: Apioideae
- Tribe: Selineae
- Genus: Cymopterus; Raf.

Species
- See text.

Synonyms
- Aulospermum J.M.Coult. & Rose; Coloptera J.M.Coult. & Rose; Coriophyllus Rydb.; Epallageiton Koso-Pol.; Leptocnemia Nutt.; Pseudocymopterus J.M.Coult. & Rose; Pseudopteryxia Rydb.; Pseudoreoxis Rydb.; Pteryxia Nutt.; Rhysopterus J.M.Coult. & Rose; Ryssosciadium Kuntze

= Cymopterus =

Genus of flowering plants

Cymopterus is a genus of perennial plants in the family Apiaceae native to western North America. They are commonly known as the spring parsleys and are edible. They are mostly stemless, taprooted perennial herbs with leaves at ground level and flowering scapes bearing yellow, white, or purple flowers.

== Taxonomy ==
The taxonomy of this genus was described as confused in 2004, even after many decades of study. Authors have organized it in different ways, sometimes including several closely related Apiaceae genera within it. Genera recently segregated from Cymopterus include Vesper, six plants with morphological characters that are well-defined and easily separated from Cymopterus; the group has been separated before, but was reintegrated during repeated reorganizations of the genus. The number of accepted species has varied between about 50 to about 35.

The genus was named by Constantine Samuel Rafinesque in 1819.

=== Species ===
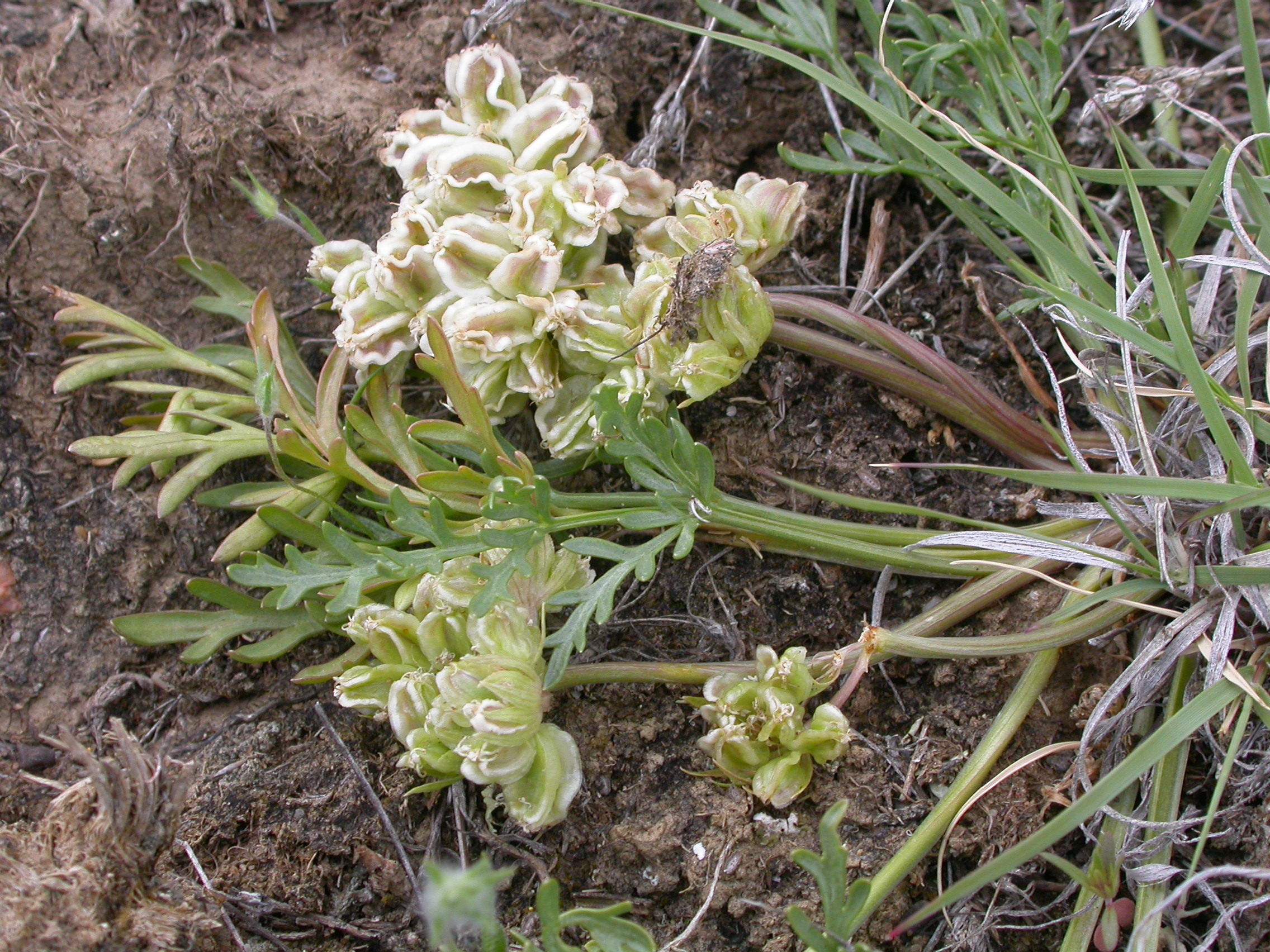
Cymopterus glomeratus

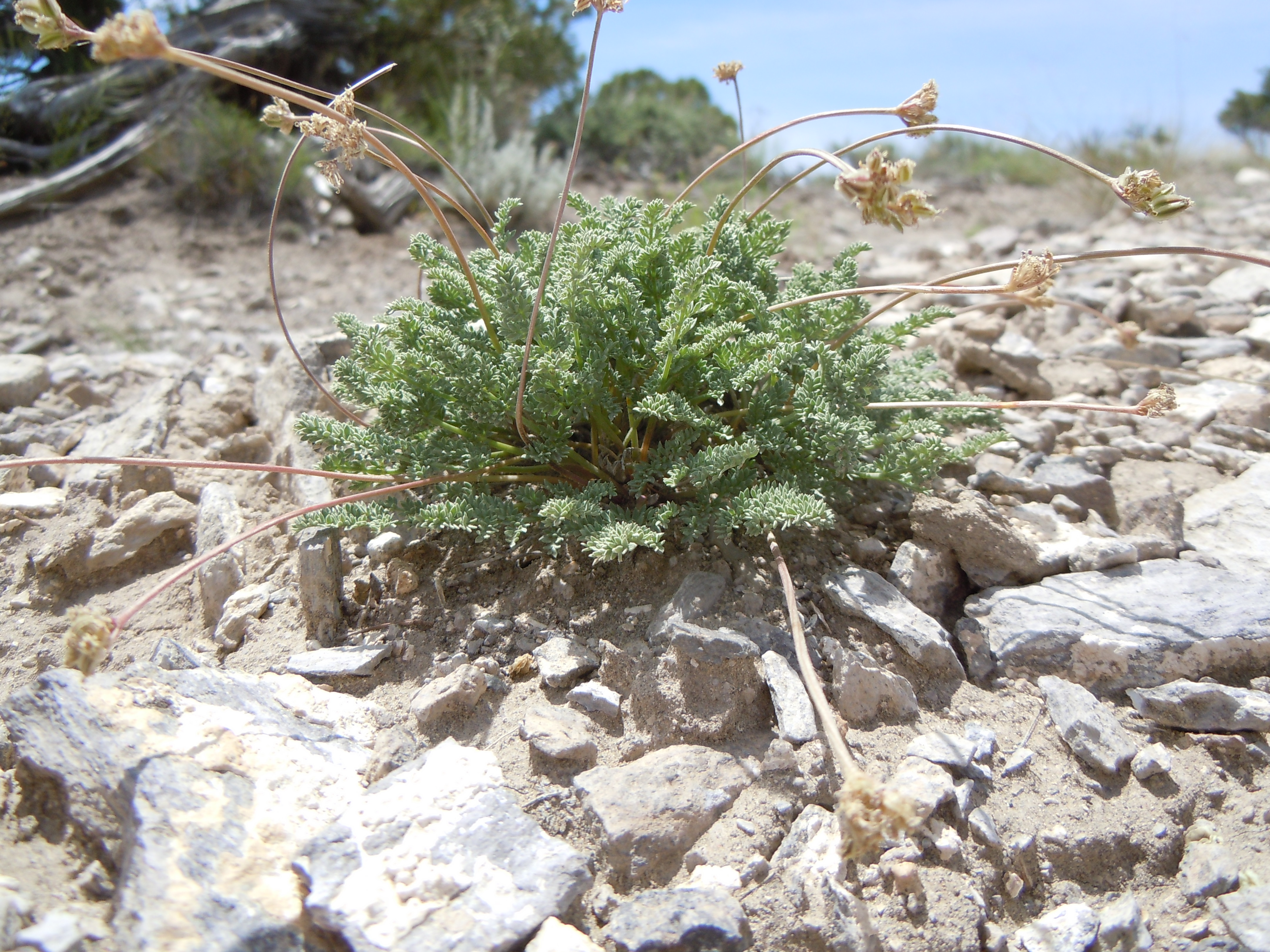
Cymopterus nivalis

Plants of the World Online lists 42 accepted species:

- Cymopterus aboriginum M.E.Jones – Indian parsnip, Indian springparsley
- Cymopterus alpinus A.Gray
- Cymopterus basalticus M.E.Jones – basalt springparsley
- Cymopterus beckii S.L.Welsh & Goodrich – featherleaf springparsley
- Cymopterus cinerarius A.Gray – gray springparsley
- Cymopterus corrugatus M.E.Jones
- Cymopterus coulteri (M.E.Jones) Mathias
- Cymopterus crawfordensis K.Moon, S.L.Welsh & Goodrich
- Cymopterus davidsonii (J.M.Coult. & Rose) R.L.Hartm.
- Cymopterus davisii R.L.Hartm. – Davis' springparsley
- Cymopterus deserticola Brandegee – desert springparsley
- Cymopterus douglassii R.L.Hartm. & Constance – Douglass' springparsley
- Cymopterus duchesnensis M.E.Jones – Duchesne biscuitroot, Uinta Basin springparsley
- Cymopterus evertii R.L.Hartm. & R.S.Kirkp. – Evert's springparsley
- Cymopterus gilmanii C.V.Morton – Gilman's springparsley
- Cymopterus glaucus Nutt. – smooth springparsley, waxy springparsley
- Cymopterus globosus (S.Watson) S.Watson – globe springparsley
- Cymopterus glomeratus (Nutt.) DC. – plains springparsley
- Cymopterus goodrichii S.L.Welsh & Neese – Goodrich's springparsley, Toiyabe springparsley
- Cymopterus hendersonii (J.M.Coult. & Rose) Cronquist
- Cymopterus ibapensis M.E.Jones
- Cymopterus jonesii J.M.Coult. & Rose – Jones' springparsley
- Cymopterus lapidosus (M.E.Jones) M.E.Jones
- Cymopterus lemmonii (J.M.Coult. & Rose) Dorn
- Cymopterus longilobus (Rydb.) W.A.Weber
- Cymopterus longipes S.Watson – longstalk springparsley, sprawling springparsley
- Cymopterus longiradiatus (Mathias, Constance & W.L.Theob.) B.L.Turner
- Cymopterus macdougalii (J.M.Coult. & Rose) Tidestr.
- Cymopterus megacephalus M.E.Jones – largeleaf springparsley
- Cymopterus minimus (Mathias) Mathias – Cedar Breaks springparsley
- Cymopterus newberryi (S.Watson) M.E.Jones – sweetroot springparsley, sticky springparsley
- Cymopterus nivalis S.Watson – snowline springparsley, Elko springparsley
- Cymopterus panamintensis J.M.Coult. & Rose – Panamint springparsley
- Cymopterus petraeus M.E.Jones
- Cymopterus purpureus S.Watson – purple springparsley, Colorado Plateau springparsley, variable springparsley
- Cymopterus ripleyi Barneby – Ripley's springparsley
- Cymopterus rosei (M.E.Jones ex J.M.Coult. & Rose) M.E.Jones – Rose's springparsley
- Cymopterus sessiliflorus (W.L.Theob. & C.C.Tseng) R.L.Hartm.
- Cymopterus spellenbergii R.L.Hartm. & J.E.Larson
- Cymopterus terebinthinus (Hook.) Torr. & A.Gray – turpentine wavewing
- Cymopterus trotteri (S.L.Welsh & Goodrich) Cronquist
- Cymopterus williamsii R.L.Hartm. & Constance – Williams' springparsley

=== Formerly included here ===
- Oreoxis bakeri (as Cymopterus bakeri)
- Oreoxis humilis (as Cymopterus humilis)
- Vesper multinervatus (as Cymopterus multinervatus)
- Vesper purpurascens (as Cymopterus purpurascens)
