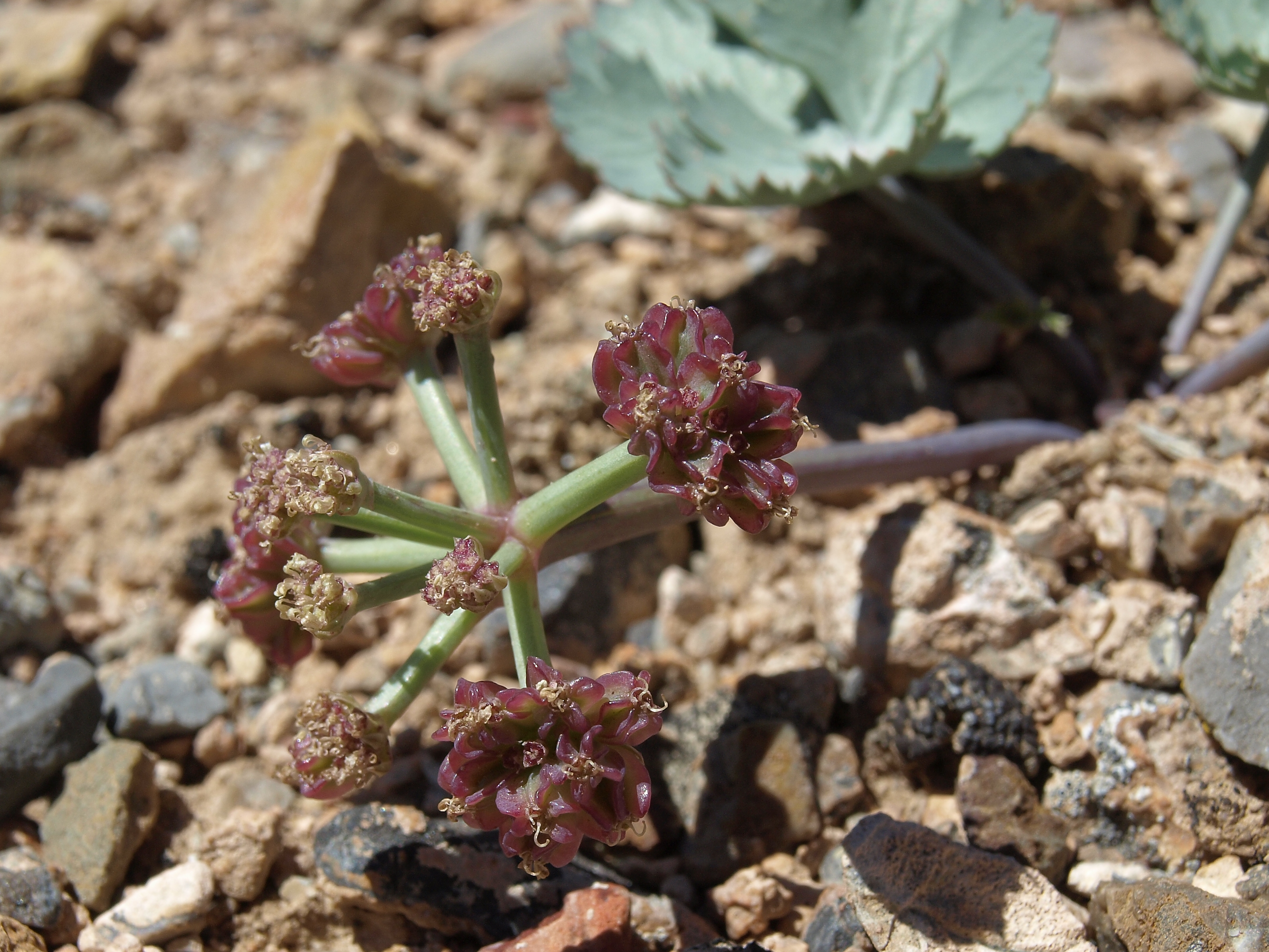

Conservation status
- Imperiled (NatureServe)

Scientific classification
- Kingdom: Plantae
- Clade: Tracheophytes
- Clade: Angiosperms
- Clade: Eudicots
- Clade: Asterids
- Order: Apiales
- Family: Apiaceae
- Genus: Cymopterus
- Species: C. basalticus

Binomial name
- Cymopterus basalticus M.E. Jones

= Cymopterus basalticus =

Species of flowering plant

Cymopterus basalticus is a species of flowering plant in the carrot family known by the common name Intermountain wavewing. It is native only to parts of Utah and White Pine County, Nevada in the United States. It is a perennial herb, 5 cm (2.0 in) to 15 cm (5.9 in) tall, and produces purple or yellow flowers in spring. C. basalticus grows on bare basaltic and clay soils typically in pinyon-juniper woodland and sagebrush communities.
