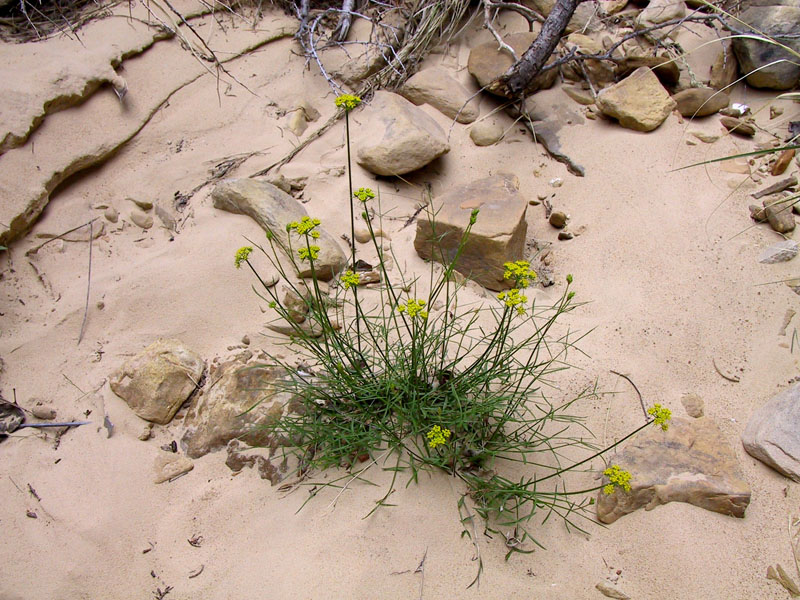

Conservation status
- Critically Imperiled (NatureServe)

Scientific classification
- Kingdom: Plantae
- Clade: Embryophytes
- Clade: Tracheophytes
- Clade: Angiosperms
- Clade: Eudicots
- Clade: Asterids
- Order: Apiales
- Family: Apiaceae
- Genus: Cymopterus
- Species: C. beckii

Binomial name
- Cymopterus beckii S.L.Welsh & Goodrich

= Cymopterus beckii =

Species of flowering plant

Cymopterus beckii is a rare species of flowering plant in the carrot family known by the common names featherleaf springparsley, Beck springparsley, and pinnate springparsley. It is native to Utah and Arizona in the United States. There are disjunct occurrences at Capitol Reef National Park and in the Abajo Mountains of San Juan County, Utah. It has also been reported from Navajo County, Arizona.

This perennial herb grows from a taproot and reaches 40 centimeters tall. The leaves are divided into many subdivided segments, and the terminal leaflets are narrow and variable in size. The inflorescence is an umbel of yellow flowers.

This plant grows in Navajo Sandstone in sandy cracks and crevices among conifers and manzanitas.
