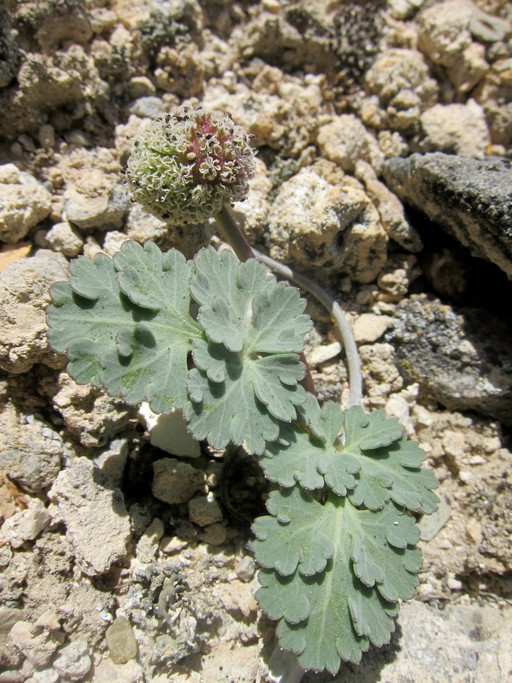

Conservation status
- Vulnerable (NatureServe)

Scientific classification
- Kingdom: Plantae
- Clade: Tracheophytes
- Clade: Angiosperms
- Clade: Eudicots
- Clade: Asterids
- Order: Apiales
- Family: Apiaceae
- Genus: Cymopterus
- Species: C. globosus

Binomial name
- Cymopterus globosus S.Watson

= Cymopterus globosus =

Species of flowering plant

Cymopterus globosus is a species of flowering plant in the carrot family known by the common name globe springparsley. This plant is native to the sandy flats extending between eastern California and Utah in the western United States. It is a low, stemless plant with leaves parallel to or lying flat on the ground. The green-gray parsley-shaped leaves are divided into several leaflets, which are further divided into neatly pointed segments. One or more tall purple or red-brown peduncles hold an inflorescence which is a spherical umbel densely packed with white or pinkish-purple flowers. They may be held in pairs atop the peduncle, and are often heavy enough to bend the peduncle to the ground.
