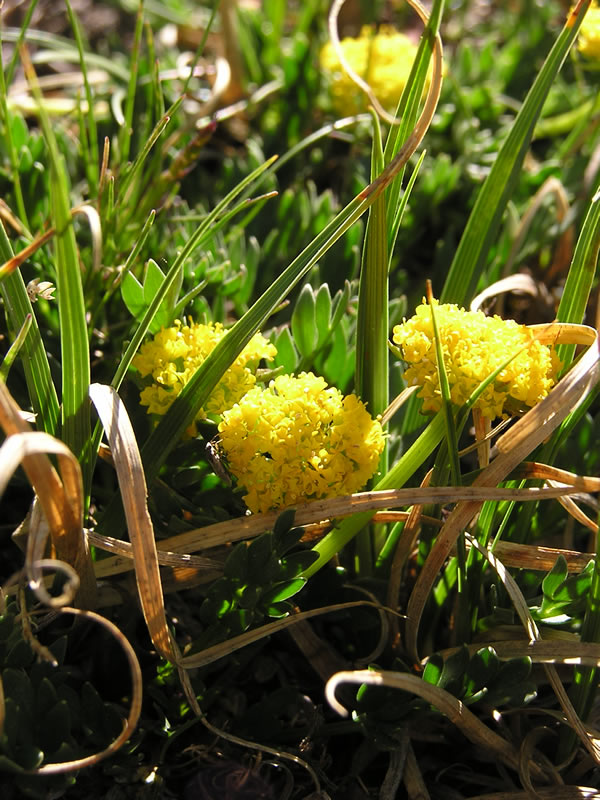

Conservation status
- Critically Imperiled (NatureServe)

Scientific classification
- Kingdom: Plantae
- Clade: Embryophytes
- Clade: Tracheophytes
- Clade: Spermatophytes
- Clade: Angiosperms
- Clade: Eudicots
- Clade: Asterids
- Order: Apiales
- Family: Apiaceae
- Genus: Oreoxis
- Species: O. humilis

Binomial name
- Oreoxis humilis Raf.

Synonyms
- Cymopterus humilis (Raf.) Tidestr.

= Oreoxis humilis =

Plant species in the parsley family

Oreoxis humilis, is a rare species of flowering plant in the parsley family known by the common name Pikes Peak spring-parsley. It is endemic to Colorado in the United States, where it is known only from the vicinity of Pikes Peak. There are three occurrences, for a total population of about 4240 individuals.

The plant is threatened by construction and maintenance on the Pikes Peak Highway.

== Description ==
This perennial herb grows to between 2 and 15 centimeters tall. It is almost entirely hairless, but occasionally some hairs at the base of it umbel or in the inflorescence. All of its leaves are basal, growing directly from the base of the plant. The leaves measure 0.5 to 4.5 cm long, excluding the leaf stem, and 0.5 to 1 cm wide. It blooms with yellow flowers during the summer. It grows on granite substrates above the tree line.

== Taxonomy ==
Oreoxis humilis was scientifically named by Constantine Samuel Rafinesque in 1830. Alongside Oreoxis bakeri, it is one of just two accepted species in the genus Oreoxis, also named by Rafinesque. The genus is classified as part of the family Apiaceae. It has just one synonym, Cymopterus humilis, created when Ivar Tidestrom moved the species to Cymopterus in 1941. It has no subspecies.

=== Names ===
Oreoxis humilis is known by the common names Pikes Peak spring-parsley, dwarf alpine parsley, and Rocky Mountain alpineparsley.

== Range and habitat ==
Pikes Peak spring-parsley grows in two Colorado counties, El Paso and Teller, on Pikes Peak. The size of its range is 48 square kilometers (19 sq mi), but the total area occupied by the plant is approximately 225 hectares (557 acres). There are three populations within its range with an estimated 4,240 plants, but the Colorado Natural Heritage Program hypothesized that it may grow in every area above timberline on the mountain in 2001. They grow at elevations of 3,290 to 4,270 meters (10,790 to 14,010 ft).

It grows in alpine fellfields, slopes covered in rocks, alpine meadows, ridges, and amid boulder outcrops. The soils it grows in are largely composed of gravel and rocks eroded out of the granite making up the mountain.
