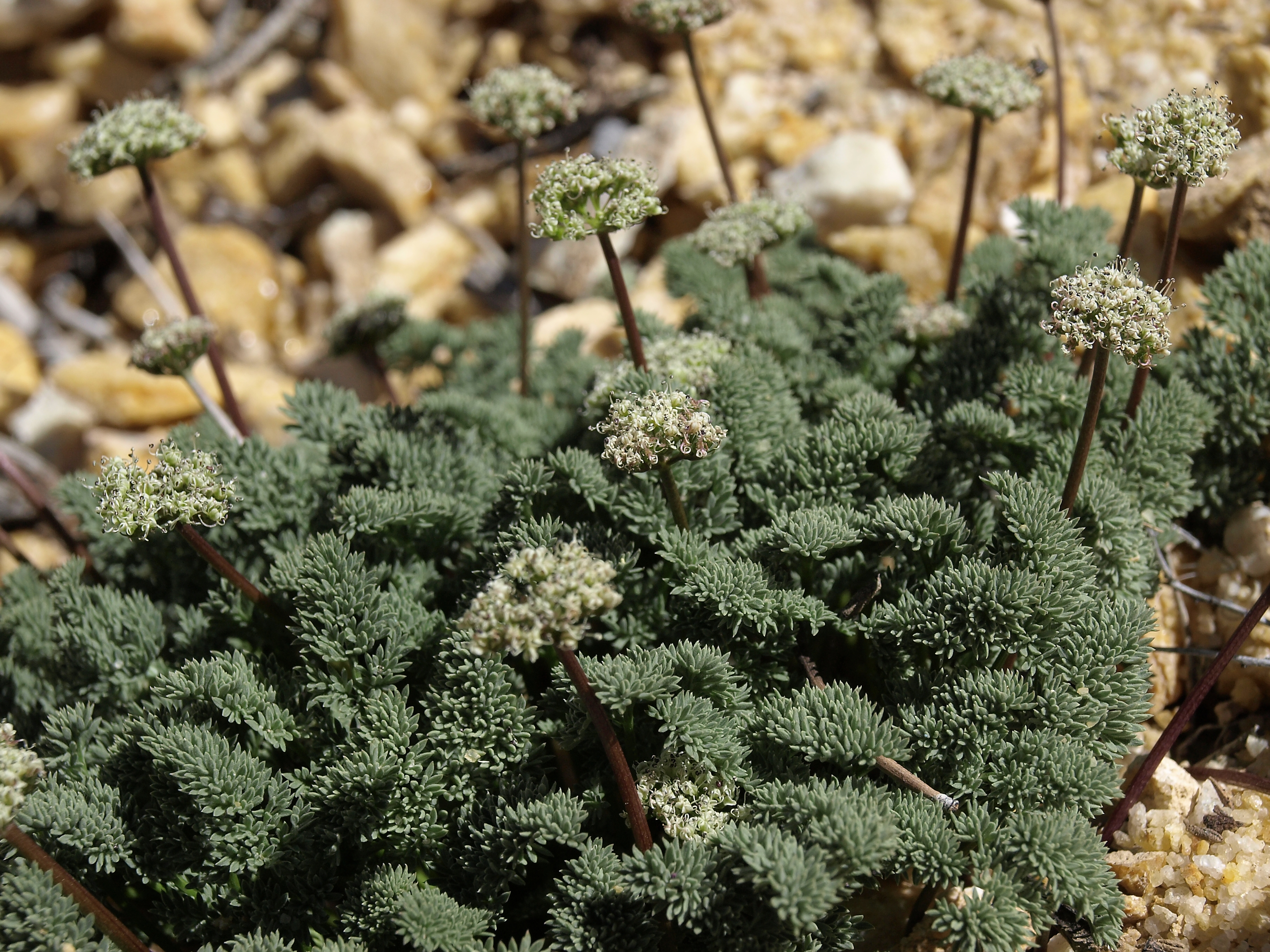

Conservation status
- Vulnerable (NatureServe)

Scientific classification
- Kingdom: Plantae
- Clade: Tracheophytes
- Clade: Angiosperms
- Clade: Eudicots
- Clade: Asterids
- Order: Apiales
- Family: Apiaceae
- Genus: Cymopterus
- Species: C. aboriginum

Binomial name
- Cymopterus aboriginum M.E.Jones

= Cymopterus aboriginum =

Species of flowering plant

Cymopterus aboriginum is a species of flowering plant in the carrot family known by the common name Indian springparsley.

== Description ==
Cymopterus aboriginum is small, flat, taprooted perennial. It has no stem, instead forming a patch of basal leaves flat on the ground. The leaves are gray-green and highly divided into tiny segments, giving the foliage a wrinkly, lacy look. It is also covered in minute, rough hairs.

The plant erects tall peduncles which support the flowers. The peduncles and umbels are brownish and the small flowers within the crinkly inflorescence are white.

== Distribution and habitat ==
The plant is native to the US states of California and Nevada. It grows in the rocky soils of the Mojave Desert mountains.

== See also ==
- Flora of the California desert regions
- Natural history of the Mojave Desert
