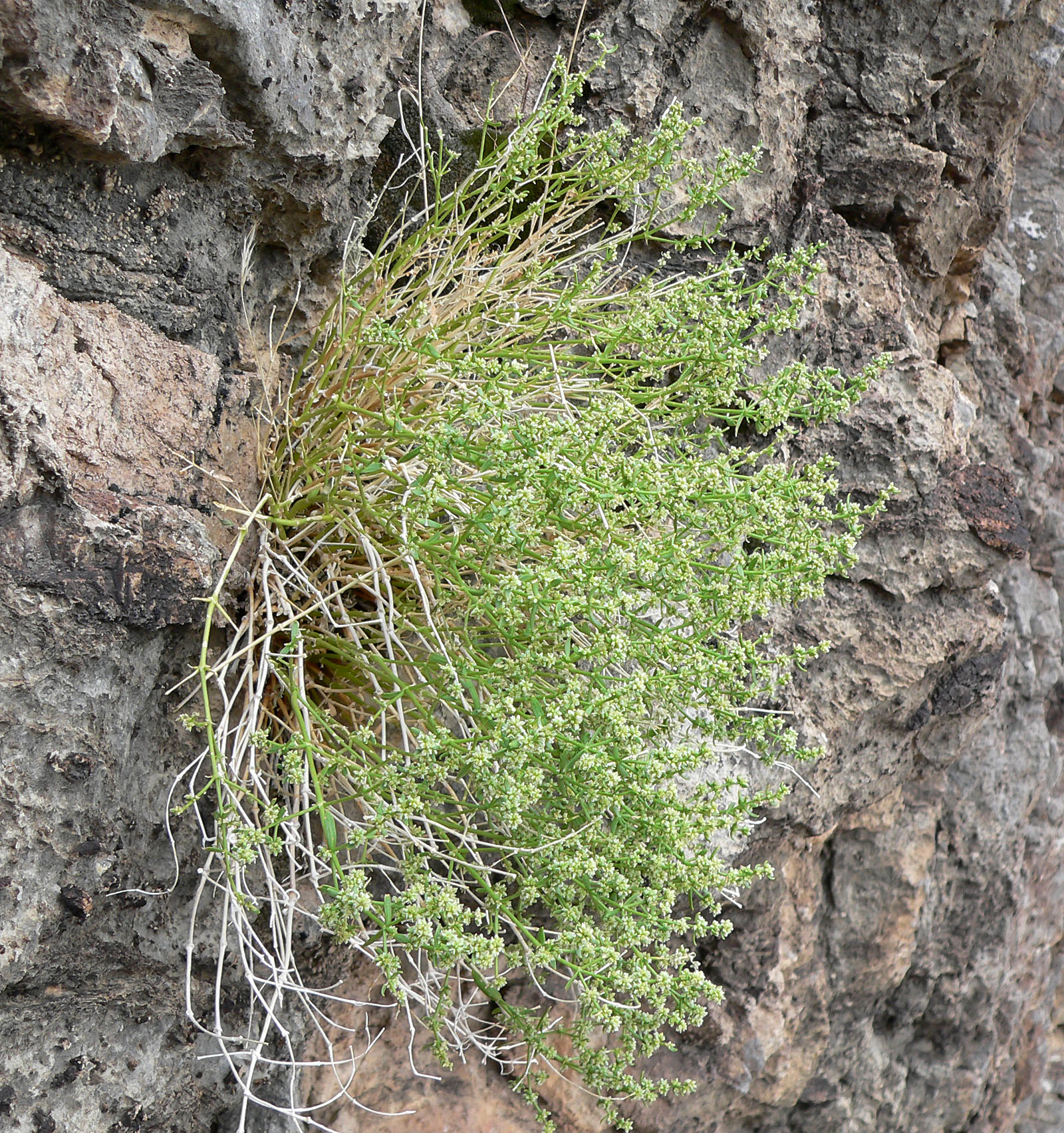

Scientific classification
- Kingdom: Plantae
- Clade: Tracheophytes
- Clade: Angiosperms
- Clade: Eudicots
- Order: Caryophyllales
- Family: Caryophyllaceae
- Genus: Scopulophila
- Species: S. rixfordii

Binomial name
- Scopulophila rixfordii (Brandegee) Munz & I.M.Johnst.

Synonyms
- Achyronychia rixfordii Brandegee

= Scopulophila rixfordii =

Species of flowering plant

Scopulophila rixfordii is a species of flowering plant in the family Caryophyllaceae known by the common name Rixford's rockwort.

The plant is native to the Mojave Desert of eastern California, southern Nevada, and probably Arizona. It grows in rocky habitat, including sheer limestone cliffs and canyons.

== Description ==
Scopulophila rixfordii produces a branching stem 10 to 30 centimeters long which anchors to its substrate by a taproot. It has areas of woolly fibers on the stem but is mostly hairless.

There are small, fleshy green leaves with linear or lance-shaped blades oppositely arranged along the stem. Each is accompanied by a small, pointed stipule.

Flowers occur in the leaf axils and are solitary or arranged in small clusters. The flowers have no petals but thin white sepals with thin membranous edges.
