= Cymopterus evertii =

Conservation status
- Imperiled (NatureServe)

Scientific classification
- Kingdom: Plantae
- Clade: Tracheophytes
- Clade: Angiosperms
- Clade: Eudicots
- Clade: Asterids
- Order: Apiales
- Family: Apiaceae
- Genus: Cymopterus
- Species: C. evertii

Binomial name
- Cymopterus evertii R.L.Hartm. & Kirkpatrick

Species of flowering plant

Cymopterus evertii is a species of flowering plant in the carrot family known by the common names Evert's springparsley and Evert's waferparsnip. It is native to Utah and Wyoming in the United States.

This plant was first discovered in 1981 and described in 1986. It is a small perennial herb forming a low tuft of herbage from a branching caudex covered in the persistent bases of previous seasons' leaves. The leaves are up to 13 centimeters long and 1.6 wide. They are divided into many small sections. When crushed they smell like orange peels. The inflorescence is an umbel of tiny white flowers.

This plant is found in northwestern Wyoming and northeastern Utah. It may be more appropriately described as a Wyoming plant with a small disjunct occurrence in Utah. It grows in a number of mountain and foothill habitat types, mostly located in the subalpine zone, with some at lower elevations and some in the alpine climates higher up. Most occurrences are located in the open on rocky substrates with little vegetative cover. There may be a few trees in surrounding terrain, such as limber pine, Engelmann spruce, and Douglas-fir. The soils are mostly volcanic. It can be found in scree and on fell fields. Many occurrences are in the Absaroka Range.

There are few serious threats to the species because it occurs on largely inaccessible terrain.
