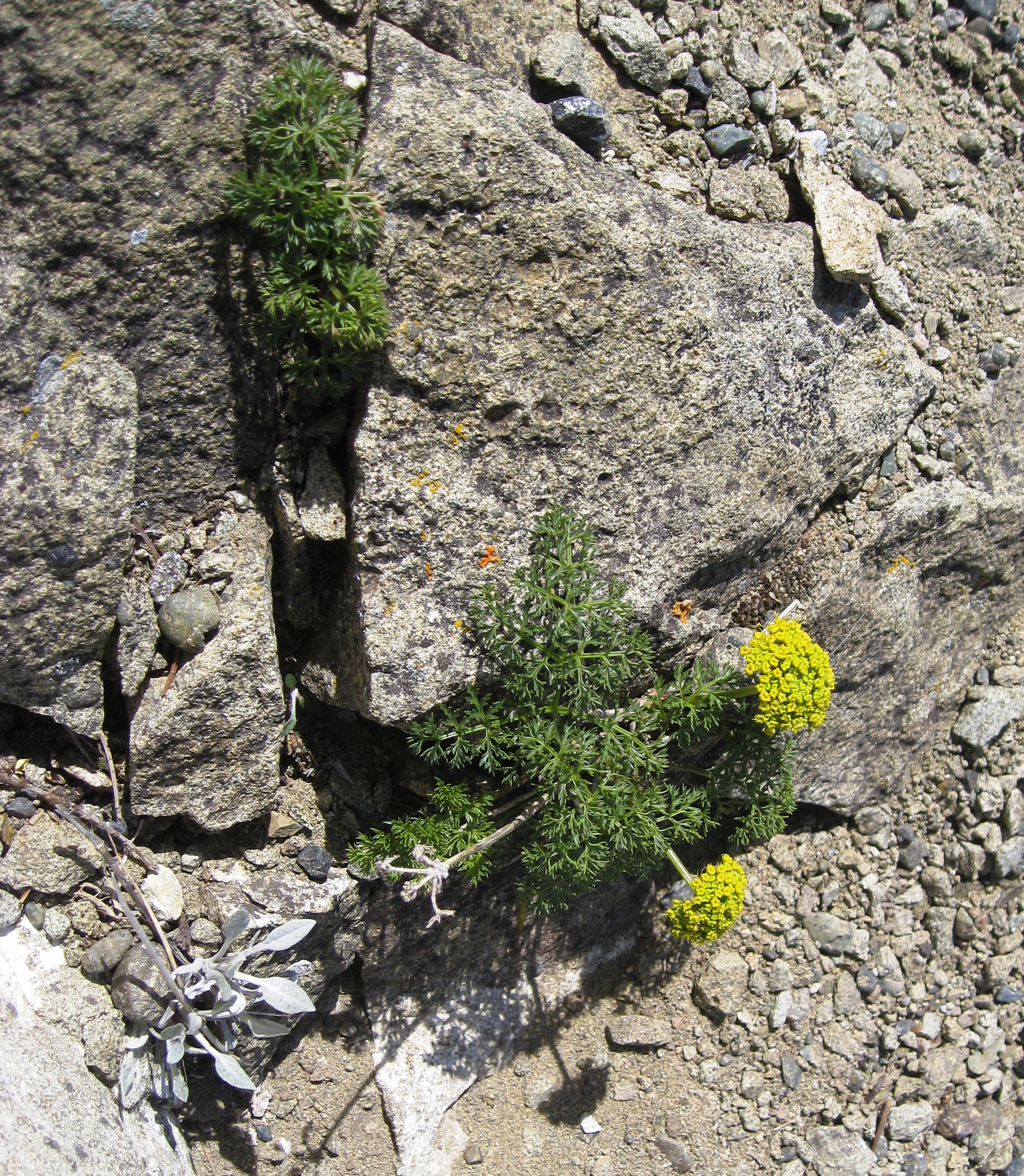

Conservation status
- Secure (NatureServe)

Scientific classification
- Kingdom: Plantae
- Clade: Tracheophytes
- Clade: Angiosperms
- Clade: Eudicots
- Clade: Asterids
- Order: Apiales
- Family: Apiaceae
- Genus: Cymopterus
- Species: C. terebinthinus

Binomial name
- Cymopterus terebinthinus Cronquist

= Cymopterus terebinthinus =

Species of flowering plant

Cymopterus terebinthinus is a perennial plant in the carrot family Apiaceae with leaves that look like parsley and grows in the Great Basin of the American West. Common names include Aromatic spring-parsley, northern Indian parsnip, and turpentine cymopterus.

== Name ==
Cymopterus means "wavy wing", referring to the fruit. Terebinthinus ('of turpentine') refers to the pungent smell of the plant's oil.

== Description ==
=== Growth pattern ===
It is a low growing perennial plant from 1/2 to 2 feet (0.15 to 0.61 m) tall, spreading out from a woody base.

=== Leaves and stems ===
Leaves are 1/2 to 8 inches (1.3 to 20.3 cm) long. Leaves are ovate overall, but finely pinnately dissected into segments like parsley leaves. Leaves are strongly aromatic when crushed. "Terebinthus" means "like-turpentine", referring to the scented oils in the plant.

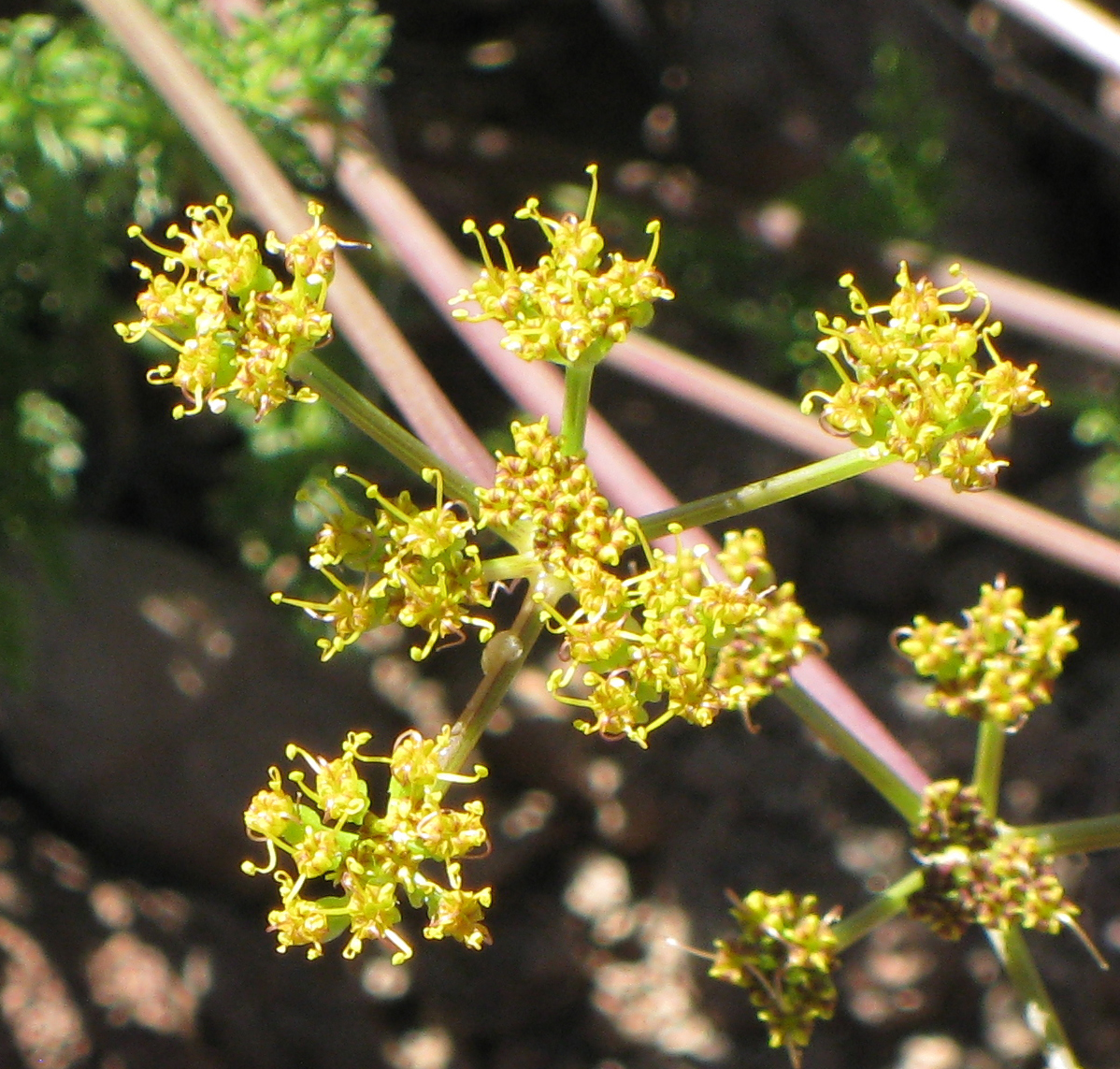
C. terebinthinus double-umbel flowerhead

=== Inflorescence and fruit ===
The inflorescence is a peduncle with 3-24 rays, each 1/2 to 3 inches (1.3 to 7.6 cm) long, bearing minuscule 5-petaled yellow flowers.

== Distribution and habitat ==
It grows on dry, sandy or rocky slopes, typically around rocks, from 5,000 to 9,000 feet (1,500 to 2,700 m) in sagebrush steppe and montane plant communities of the Great Basin. It can be found in the Toiyabe Range and Deep Creek Mountains.

== Ecology ==
It is a host for Papilio indra.

Some Plateau Indian tribes chewed the roots to treat colds and sores.
