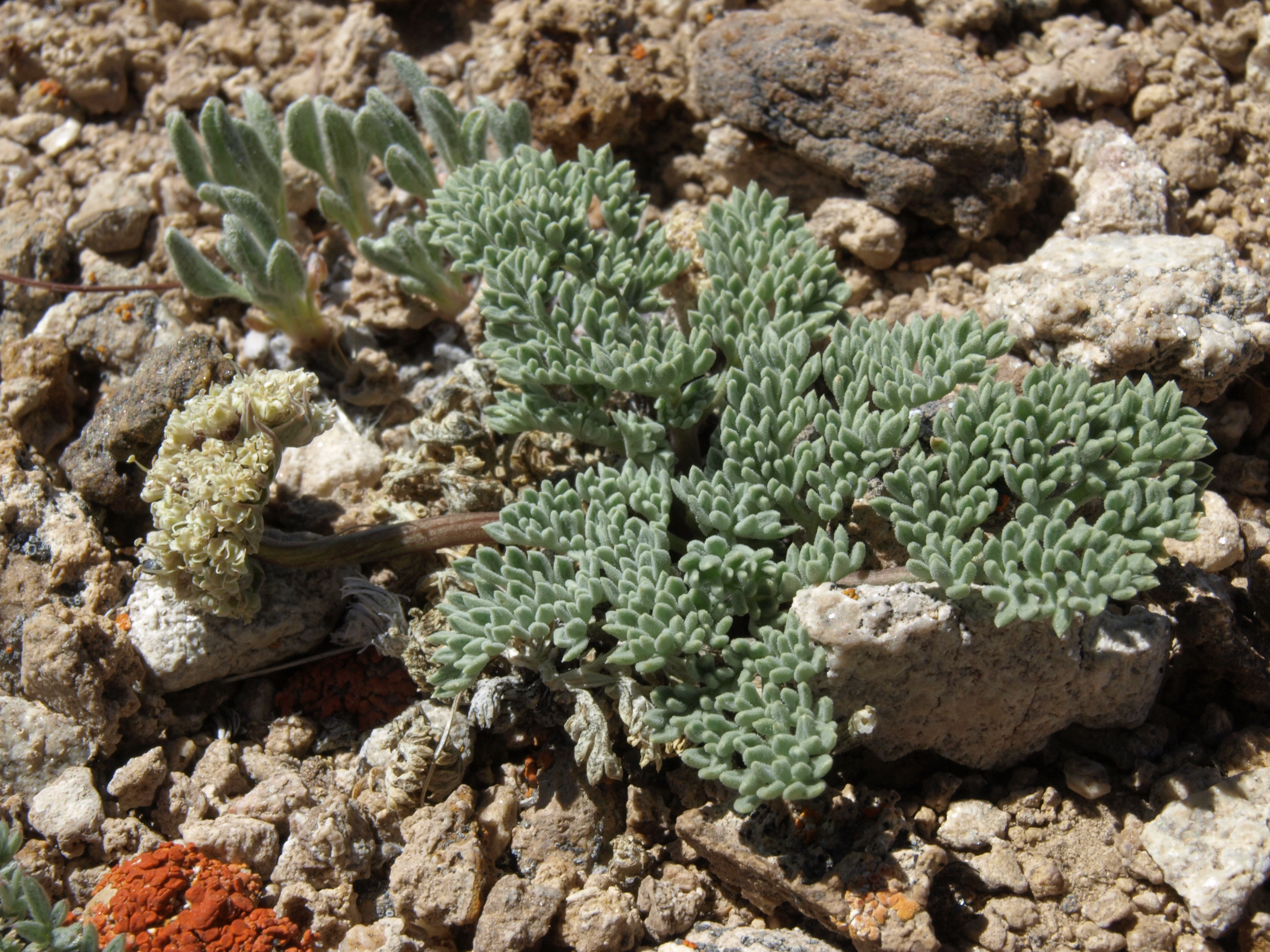

Conservation status
- Vulnerable (NatureServe)

Scientific classification
- Kingdom: Plantae
- Clade: Tracheophytes
- Clade: Angiosperms
- Clade: Eudicots
- Clade: Asterids
- Order: Apiales
- Family: Apiaceae
- Genus: Cymopterus
- Species: C. cinerarius

Binomial name
- Cymopterus cinerarius A.Gray

= Cymopterus cinerarius =

Species of flowering plant

Cymopterus cinerarius is a species of flowering plant in the carrot family known by the common name gray springparsley. This small plant is native to the US states of California and Nevada, where it grows on the rocky talus of the Sierra Nevada. This plant has a short stem and lies against the ground or draped over rocky debris. Its distinctive leaves are only a few centimeters long and dissected into segments of a few millimeters in length. The gray-green segments are thick, pointed lobes with a bumpy textured surface and a waxy epidermal coating. From the center of this patch of leaflets sprouts an erect peduncle holding the flowers. The peduncle and the umbels of flowers are reddish-green or brown and the umbel has very large wrinkly bracts which are more visible than the actual white flower corolla.
