= Vesper (plant) =

Scientific classification
- Kingdom: Plantae
- Clade: Tracheophytes
- Clade: Angiosperms
- Clade: Eudicots
- Clade: Asterids
- Order: Apiales
- Family: Apiaceae
- Genus: Vesper; R.L.Hartm. & G.L.Nesom

Synonyms
- Phellopterus (Torr. & A.Gray) Nutt. ex J.M.Coult. & Rose, nom. illeg.

Genus of flowering plants

Vesper is a genus of flowering plants belonging to the family Apiaceae.

Its native range is western and central USA to north-western Mexico. It is found in the states of Arizona, California, Colorado, Idaho, Kansas, Nebraska, Nevada, New Mexico, Oklahoma, Oregon, South Dakota, Texas, Utah and Wyoming.

== Taxonomy ==
The genus was circumscribed by Ronald Lee Hartmann and Guy L. Nesom in Phytoneuron 2012-94 on page 2 in 2012.

The genus name of Vesper is derived from Fengjie Sun (b. 1968) and Stephen Roy Downie (b. 1959), 2 American botanists and evolutionary biologists in Georgia. Their surnames combined are (Sun-down) and Vespers are prayers at sundown.

== Species ==
As accepted by Kew;

- Vesper bulbosus (A.Nelson) R.L.Hartm. & G.L.Nesom
- Vesper constancei (R.L.Hartm.) R.L.Hartm. & G.L.Nesom
- Vesper macrorhizus (Buckley) R.L.Hartm. & G.L.Nesom
- Vesper montanus (Torr. & A.Gray) R.L.Hartm. & G.L.Nesom
- Vesper multinervatus (J.M.Coult. & Rose) R.L.Hartm. & G.L.Nesom
- Vesper purpurascens (A.Gray) R.L.Hartm. & G.L.Nesom
