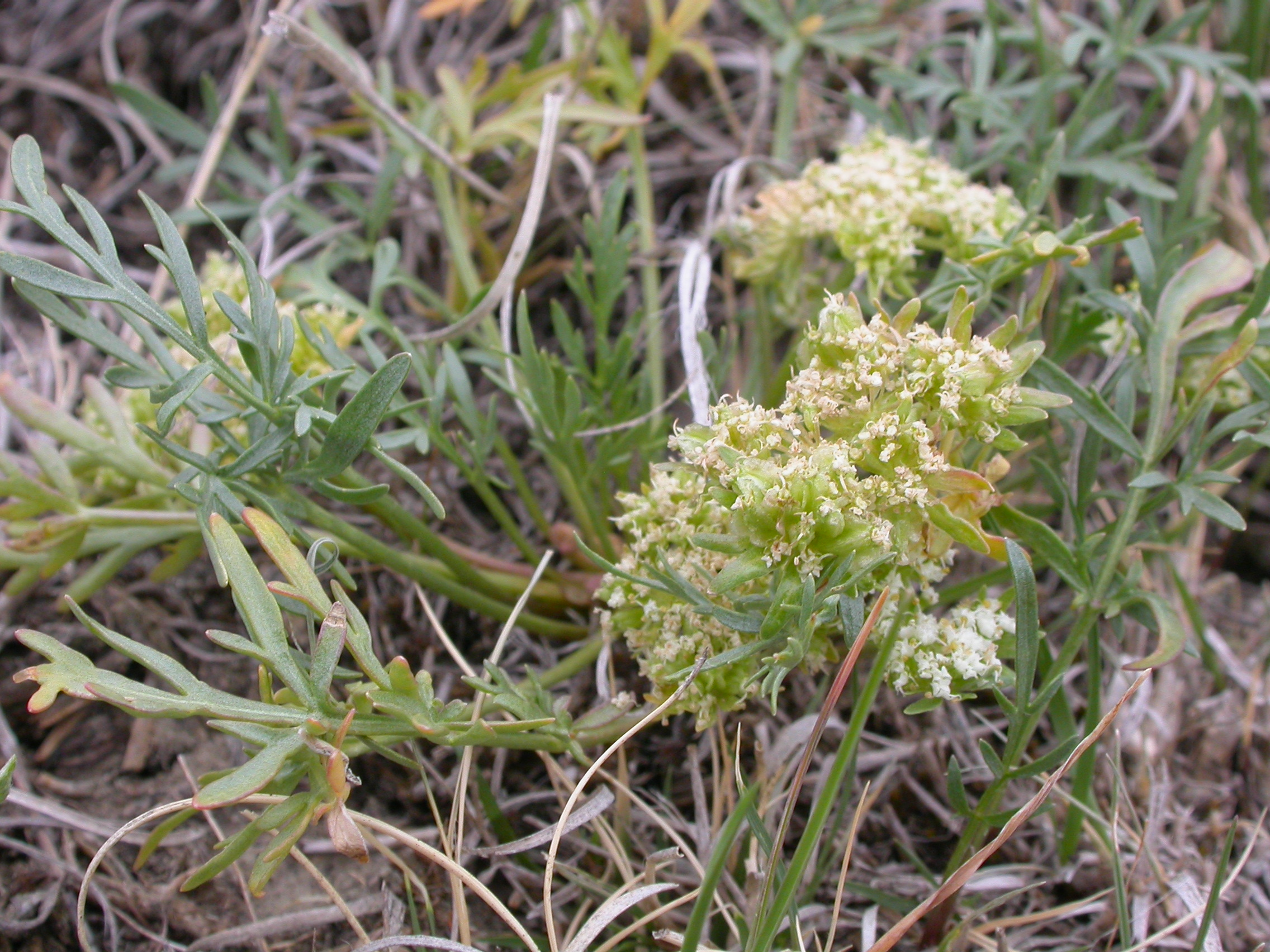

Conservation status
- Secure (NatureServe)

Scientific classification
- Kingdom: Plantae
- Clade: Tracheophytes
- Clade: Angiosperms
- Clade: Eudicots
- Clade: Asterids
- Order: Apiales
- Family: Apiaceae
- Genus: Cymopterus
- Species: C. glomeratus

Binomial name
- Cymopterus glomeratus (Nutt.) DC.

= Cymopterus glomeratus =

Species of flowering plant

Cymopterus glomeratus (Fendler's spring-parsley, Fendler's cymopterus, plains springparsley), now including Cymopterus acaulis, is a flowering plant. This plant is an aromatic plant of the family Apiaceae, a family of commonly known as the “celery, carrot, or parsley” family. The genus name comes from the Greek word, “Cyma” which means “wave” and “Pteron” which means “wing”, and combines to form the genus “Cymopterus”.

Incorrectly known as Cymopterus acaulis, a multivariate and phylogenic analysis of this plant species found that there were “not geographically distinguishable based on their overlapping or adjacent distributions” and proposed to recognize as Cymopterus acaulis and all of its varieties as one species as Cymopterus glomeratus. There were five varieties of Cymopterus acaulis, which include var. C. acaulis, var. C. fendleri, var. C. greeleyorum, var. C. higginsii, and var. C. parvus.

== Distribution ==
Cymopterus glomeratus are found in a large variety of environments, ranging from southern Canada to south-western North America to northern Mexico. They are generally specifically found in northern Chihuahua, Mexico, to Oklahoma and Texas in the United States, and southern Alberta, Saskatchewan, Canada.

It is generally found on plains or mountain meadows up to 7,500 feet (2,300 m) in elevation.

== Habitat and ecology ==
Cymopterus glomeratus is found in open the foothills and valleys, It is also found scattered over the high deserts in sandy, loamy, and clay soil in particular. They can stand elevations up to 2000m. In general it prefers well-drained soils with light shade in dry or moist soils in cultivated beds.

== Morphology ==
They have taproots which are large roots which grow downward laterally. They also create peduncles which are stems which support the inflorescences, clusters of small flowers. Their leaves generally grow from the base and generally split two or three times. The leaves are also pinnately split two or three times and form a rosette around the base.

== Flowers and fruits ==
As a perennial plant, they generally bloom from March to May. They have clusters, or inflorescences, of small flowers which are generally three different colors; white, yellow, and purple. These plants have schizocarp fruits, which are split into two flat and wide parts which contain a seed on both sides.

=== Food ===
Because of its aromatic tendency, it is eaten raw or cooked. Raw, the leaves are eaten as greens, and cooked they are used in condiments, and as a flavoring in soups.
