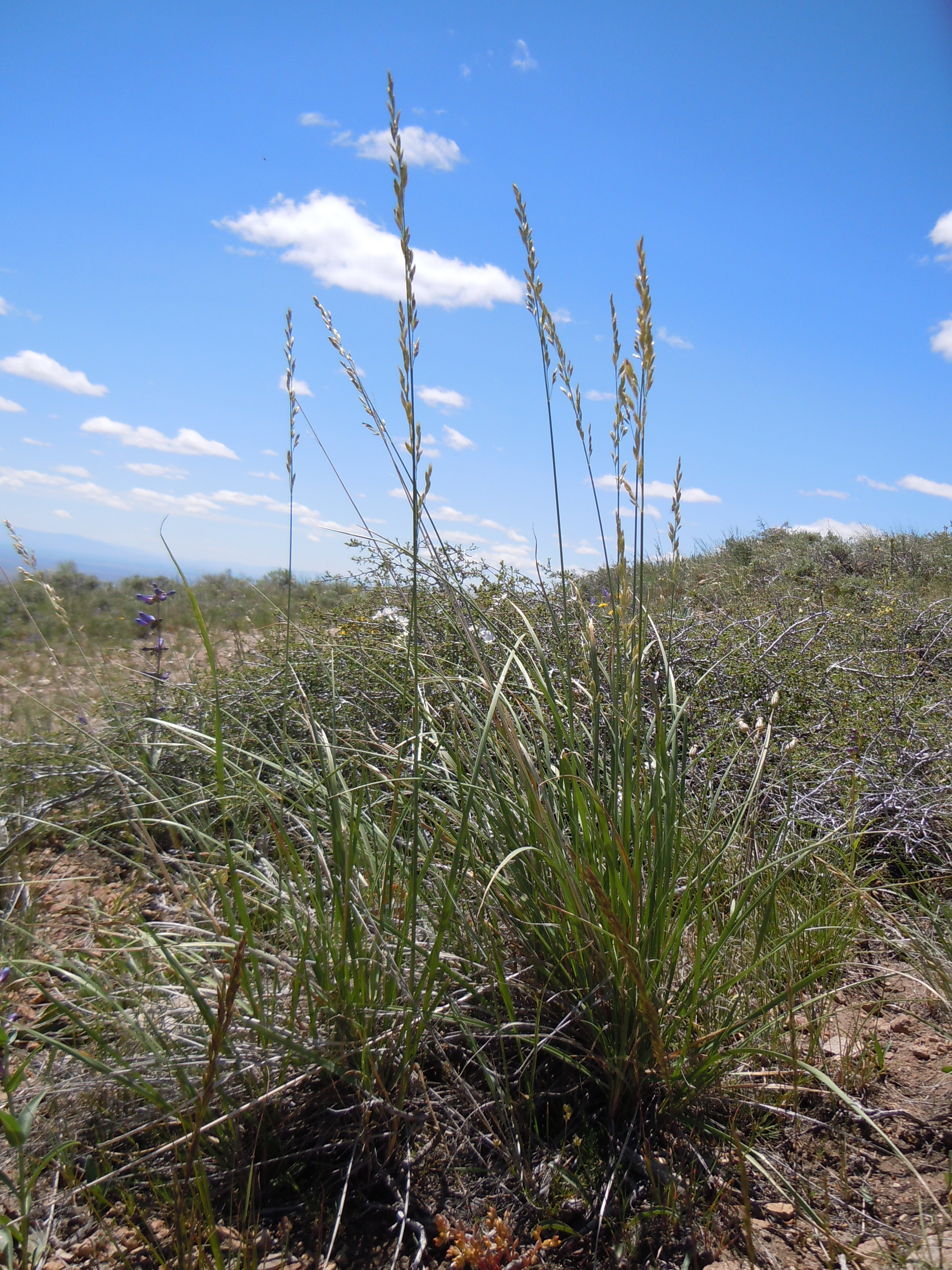

Conservation status
- Secure (NatureServe)

Scientific classification
- Kingdom: Plantae
- Clade: Tracheophytes
- Clade: Angiosperms
- Clade: Monocots
- Clade: Commelinids
- Order: Poales
- Family: Poaceae
- Subfamily: Pooideae
- Genus: Festuca
- Species: F. kingii

Binomial name
- Festuca kingii (S.Watson) Cassidy

Synonyms
- Festuca watsonii Nash, nom. superfl.; Hesperochloa kingii (S.Watson) Rydb.; Leucopoa kingii (S.Watson) W.A.Weber; Poa kingii S.Watson; Wasatchia kingii (S.Watson) M.E.Jones; Festuca confinis Vasey

= Festuca kingii =

Species of grass

Festuca kingii is a species of grass in the family Poaceae known by the common names spike fescue and King's fescue. It is native to the western United States from Oregon and California east to Nebraska and Kansas.

This grass is a clump-forming perennial growing from a rhizome. It produces erect stems up to a meter tall, or occasionally taller. Previous seasons' dry stems and leaves remain in the clump, and the clump sometimes makes a ring shape. The clumps can be 2 meters wide. The species is dioecious, with male and female parts on separate plants. The inflorescence is a narrow panicle with branches pressed up against the stem. The flowers lack awns. The plant reproduces by seed and by sprouting new clumps from its rhizome.

This grass can be found in many habitat types, including forests, woodlands, shrublands, sagebrush, prairie, and grassland. It can occur at high elevation in subalpine and alpine climates. It can be found on dry, open slopes, generally in warmer spots. Female individuals are found in the more moist spots in the habitat, and generally do not make up more than 50% of the total individuals in any habitat.

It is a climax species in some ecosystems, such as high, exposed ridges. It is a codominant species in some plant associations. In Wyoming it is dominant alongside Idaho fescue, and in Colorado it is a main understory species in Ponderosa pine communities. It is an indicator species for forests in Idaho and Wyoming.

This grass is considered to be palatable and nutritious for livestock, but it is rarely abundant enough to be a main food source for them.
