= Vesper multinervatus =

Scientific classification
- Kingdom: Plantae
- Clade: Tracheophytes
- Clade: Angiosperms
- Clade: Eudicots
- Clade: Asterids
- Order: Apiales
- Family: Apiaceae
- Genus: Vesper
- Species: V. multinervatus

Binomial name
- Vesper multinervatus (J.M.Coult. & Rose) R.L.Hartm. & G.L.Nesom

Synonyms
- Cymopterus multinervatus (J.M.Coult. & Rose) Tidestr.; Phellopterus multinervatus J.M.Coult. & Rose

Species of flowering plant

Vesper multinervatus, synonym Cymopterus multinervatus, is a species of flowering plant in the carrot family Apiaceae, known by the common name purplenerve springparsley. It is a perennial herb native to the southwestern United States, including the desert regions. It is stemless, producing leaves and inflorescence at ground level from a taproot. The leaves are erect on petioles of a few centimeters in length, with a fleshy blade dissected into waxy multilobed leaflets. The inflorescence arises on a stout purple or greenish peduncle up to about 14 centimeters tall. At the top is a rounded cluster of purple flowers sheathed in purple-veined bracts.
