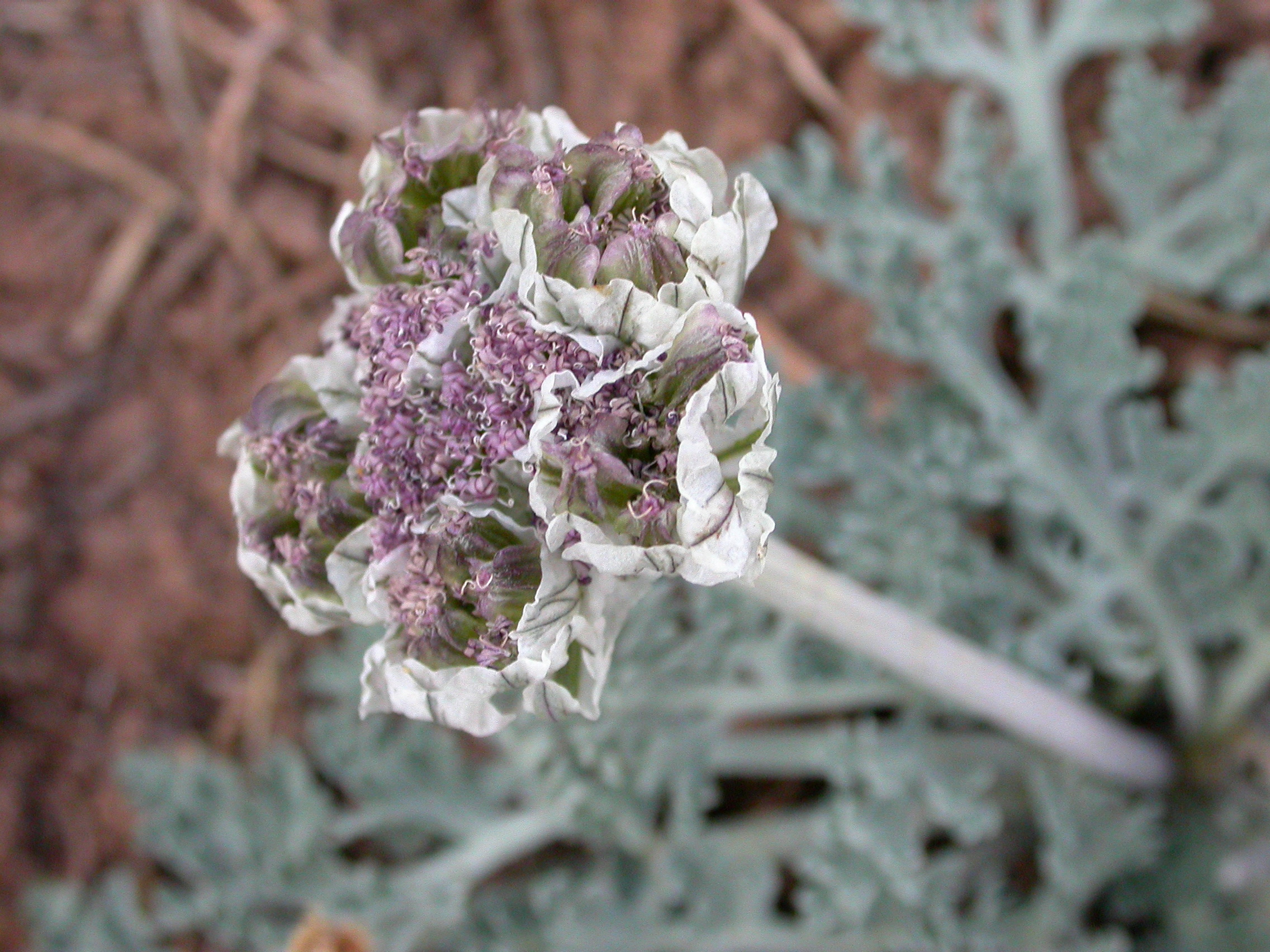

Conservation status
- Apparently Secure (NatureServe)

Scientific classification
- Kingdom: Plantae
- Clade: Tracheophytes
- Clade: Angiosperms
- Clade: Eudicots
- Clade: Asterids
- Order: Apiales
- Family: Apiaceae
- Genus: Vesper
- Species: V. purpurascens

Binomial name
- Vesper purpurascens (A.Gray) R.L.Hartm. & G.L.Nesom

Synonyms
- Cymopterus montanus var. purpurascens A.Gray; Cymopterus purpurascens (A.Gray) M.E.Jones; Phellopterus purpurascens (A.Gray) J.M.Coult. & Rose

= Vesper purpurascens =

Species of flowering plant

Vesper purpurascens, synonym Cymopterus purpurascens, is a species of flowering plant in the carrot family Apiaceae, known by the common name widewing springparsley. It is native to much of the western United States, including the desert regions. It is a perennial herb, often stemless, producing leaves and inflorescence from ground level or from a fibrous basal stalk. The waxy, fleshy leaves have blades divided into multilobed leaflets and are borne on short petioles. The inflorescence is a rounded cluster of flowers held on a peduncle which may be erect and several centimeters tall or nearly nonexistent. The purple flowers are sheathed in dark-veined white bracts.
