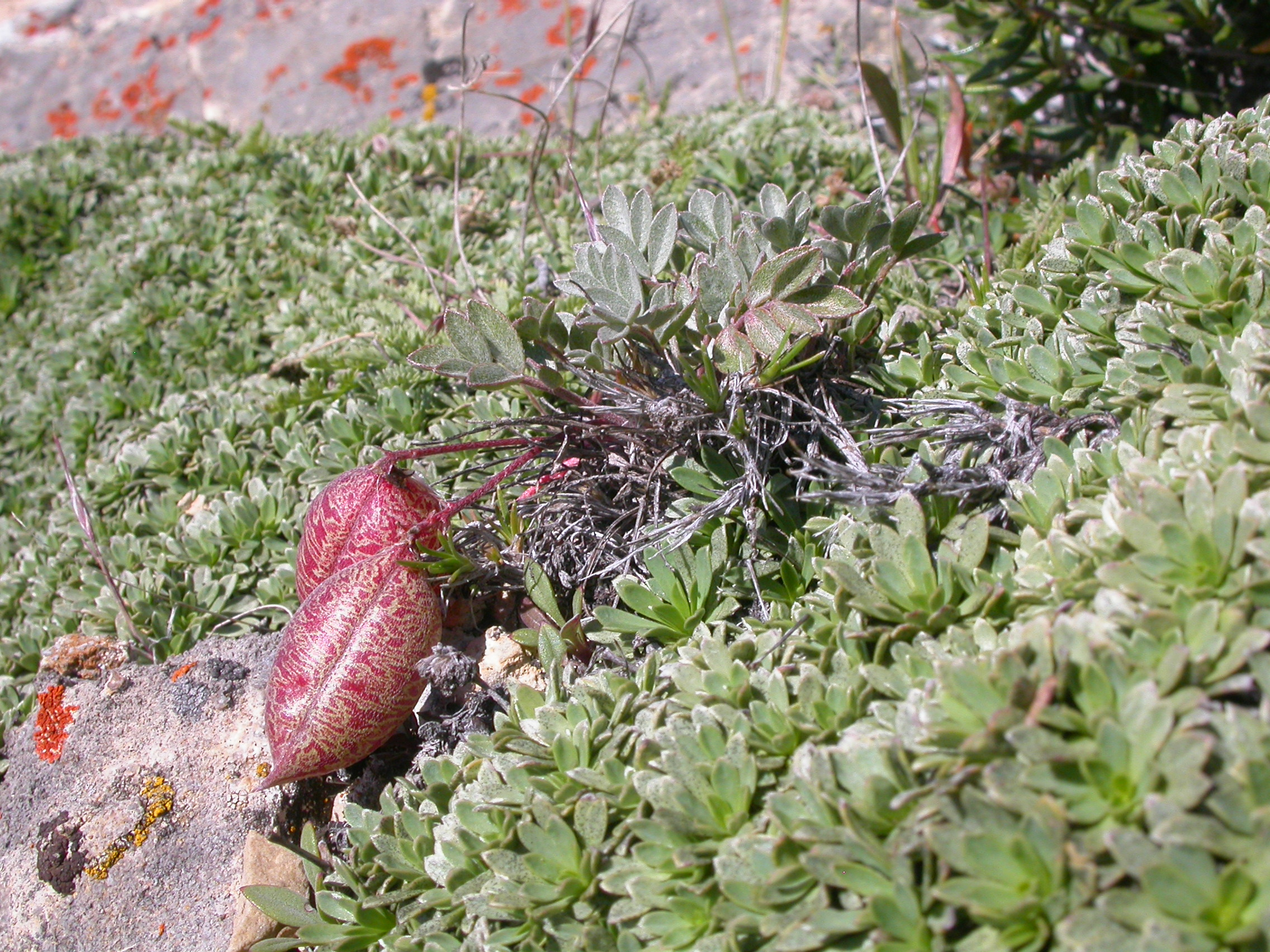
- Astragalus platytropis flowers early during the summer in higher elevations.

Conservation status
- Secure (NatureServe)

Scientific classification
- Kingdom: Plantae
- Clade: Tracheophytes
- Clade: Angiosperms
- Clade: Eudicots
- Clade: Rosids
- Order: Fabales
- Family: Fabaceae
- Subfamily: Faboideae
- Genus: Astragalus
- Species: A. platytropis

Binomial name
- Astragalus platytropis A.Gray

= Astragalus platytropis =

Species of legume

Astragalus platytropis is a species of milkvetch known by the common name broadkeel milkvetch. It is native to the western United States from Montana to California, where it lives at high elevation in alpine and subalpine plant communities. This is a small perennial milkvetch which forms a small patch of short silvery-green stems on rocky ground. The leaves may be up to 9 cm (3.5 in) long and are made up of several hairy leaflets. The inflorescence is a head of four to nine pale purple flowers, each just under 1 cm (0.39 in) long. The fruit is a bladdery legume pod which can exceed 3 cm (1.2 in) long.
