= Marcus E. Jones =

American geologist and botanist (1852–1934)

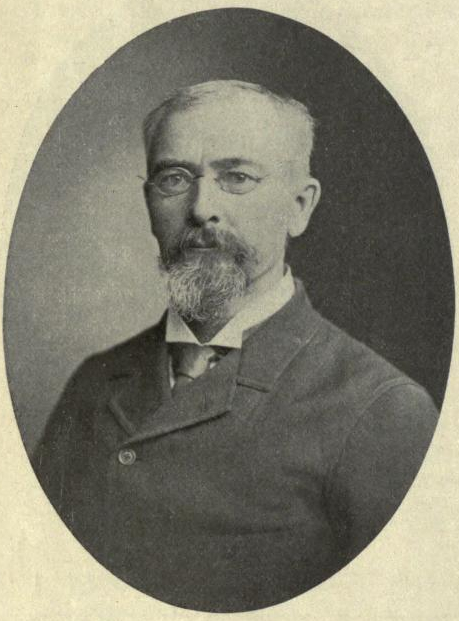
- Born: April 25, 1852; Jefferson, Ohio, United States
- Died: June 3, 1934 (aged 82); San Bernardino, California, United States
- Scientific career
- Fields: Botany
- Author abbrev. (botany): M. E. Jones

Marcus Eugene Jones (April 25, 1852 – June 3, 1934) was an American geologist, mining engineer and botanist. Throughout his career he was known for being an educator, scientist and minister. As an early explorer of the western United States, he is known as the authority for numerous vascular plants. Much of his career was spent self-employed in Salt Lake City, Utah. He edited and distributed several specimen series which resemble exsiccatae, among them one with the title Flora of California. Collected by Marcus E. Jones, A. M. and another with the title Flora of Colorado. Collected by Marcus E. Jones, A. M.. After the death of his wife in 1915, he sold his herbarium and library to Pomona College. In 1923, he continued botanical work after moving to Claremont, California.

== Childhood ==
Marcus Eugene Jones was born in Jefferson, Ohio.

== Major revisions ==
One of Jones' most notable accomplishments was his self-published revision of the North American species of Astragalus.
