= Trifolium lucanicum =

Scientific classification
- Kingdom: Plantae
- Clade: Tracheophytes
- Clade: Angiosperms
- Clade: Eudicots
- Clade: Rosids
- Order: Fabales
- Family: Fabaceae
- Subfamily: Faboideae
- Genus: Trifolium
- Species: T. lucanicum

Binomial name
- Trifolium lucanicum Guss.

Synonyms
- Trifolium scabrum var. lucanicum

Species of plant

Trifolium lucanicum is a species of plants in the family Fabaceae.

== Sources ==
This article incorporates text from a free content work. Licensed under CC0 (license statement/permission). Text taken from Trifolium lucanicum. Encyclopedia of Life.
