= Trifolium kentuckiense =

Scientific classification
- Kingdom: Plantae
- Clade: Tracheophytes
- Clade: Angiosperms
- Clade: Eudicots
- Clade: Rosids
- Order: Fabales
- Family: Fabaceae
- Subfamily: Faboideae
- Genus: Trifolium
- Species: T. kentuckiense

Binomial name
- Trifolium kentuckiense Chapel & Vincent

Species of plant

Trifolium kentuckiense is a rare species of clover commonly known as Kentucky clover.

== Description ==
It is similar in appearance to non-native Trifolium pratense, but can be distinguished before blooming by longer petioles and lack of pubescence (hairs) on the upper surface of the leaf.

== Distribution and habitat ==
The species is endemic to the U.S. state of Kentucky, where it is found only in Franklin and Woodford counties.

Unlike the related species T. reflexum, it grows best in highly basic limestone soils.

== Conservation ==
The species is considered to be highly endangered.
