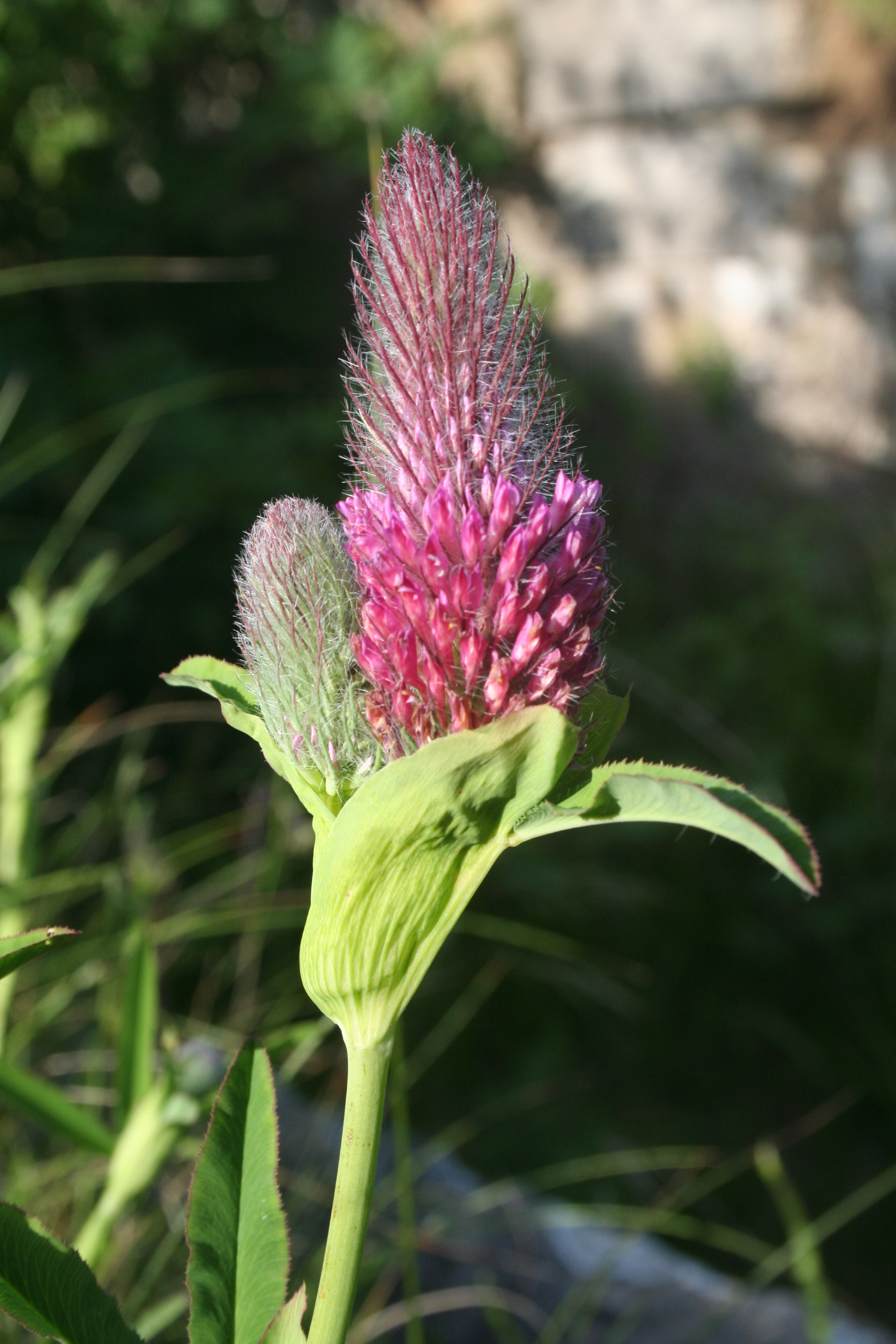

Scientific classification
- Kingdom: Plantae
- Clade: Tracheophytes
- Clade: Angiosperms
- Clade: Eudicots
- Clade: Rosids
- Order: Fabales
- Family: Fabaceae
- Subfamily: Faboideae
- Genus: Trifolium
- Species: T. rubens

Binomial name
- Trifolium rubens L.

Synonyms
- Lagopus glaber Bernh.; Trifolium eriocaulon Scheele.; Triphylloides rubens (L.) Moench.

= Trifolium rubens =

Species of legume

Trifolium rubens is a species of flowering plant belonging to the family Fabaceae.

Its native range is Central and Southern Europe to Ukraine.
