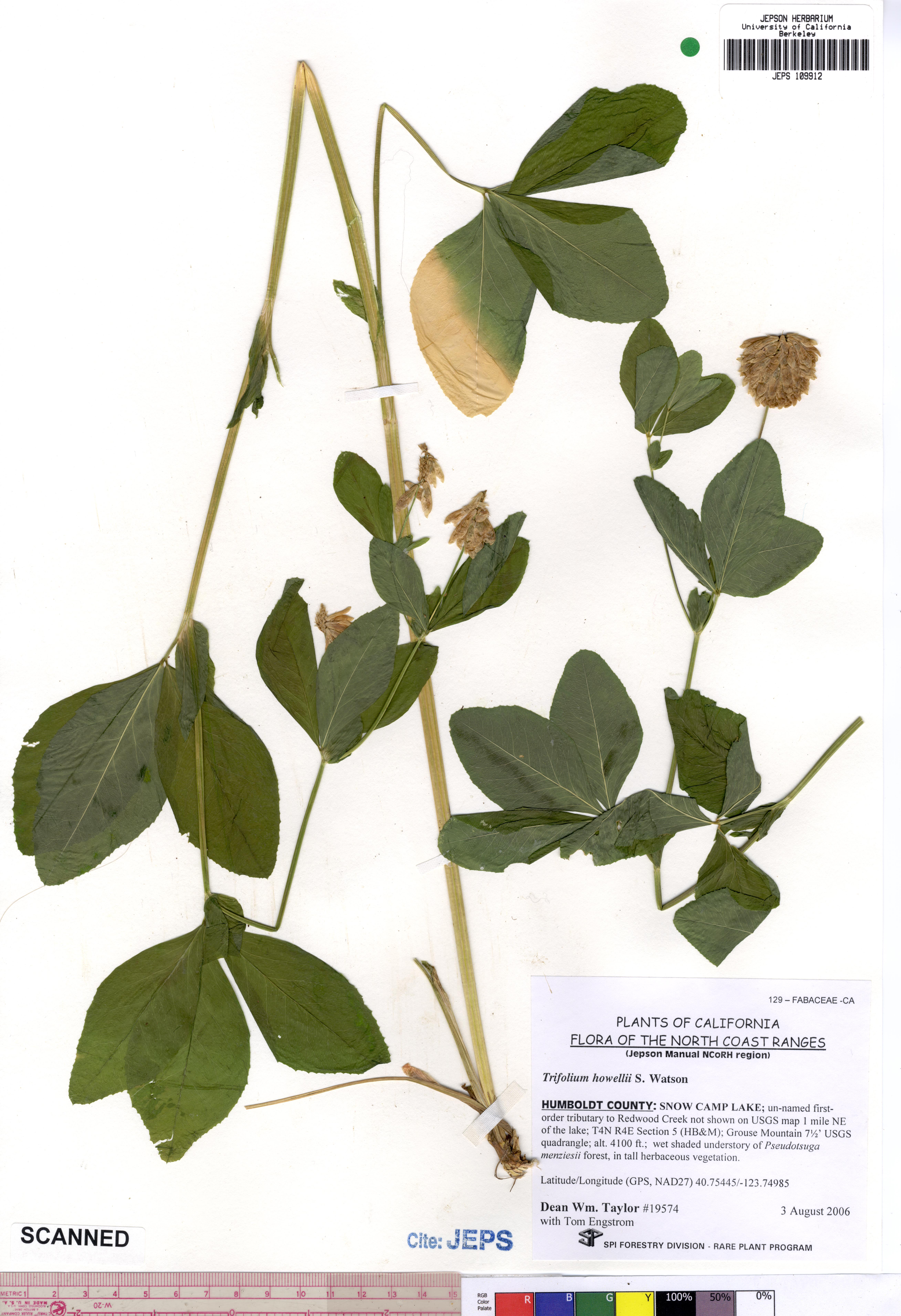
- herbarium specimen

Scientific classification
- Kingdom: Plantae
- Clade: Tracheophytes
- Clade: Angiosperms
- Clade: Eudicots
- Clade: Rosids
- Order: Fabales
- Family: Fabaceae
- Subfamily: Faboideae
- Genus: Trifolium
- Species: T. howellii

Binomial name
- Trifolium howellii S.Watson

= Trifolium howellii =

Species of legume

Trifolium howellii is a species of clover known by the common names canyon clover and Howell's clover.

== Description ==
It is a perennial herb growing erect with hairless herbage. The leaf blades are made up of large oval leaflets each measuring up to 10 centimeters (4 in) long, and large stipules which may be over 2 cm (3/4 in) long.

The inflorescence is a round or elongated flowerhead up to 3 cm long, the flowers spreading out and drooping with age. Each flower has a greenish or pinkish corolla measuring 1 cm long or more.

== Distribution and habitat ==
The species is native to Oregon and California, where it grows in moist and shady habitat types, such as swamps and forest streambanks.
