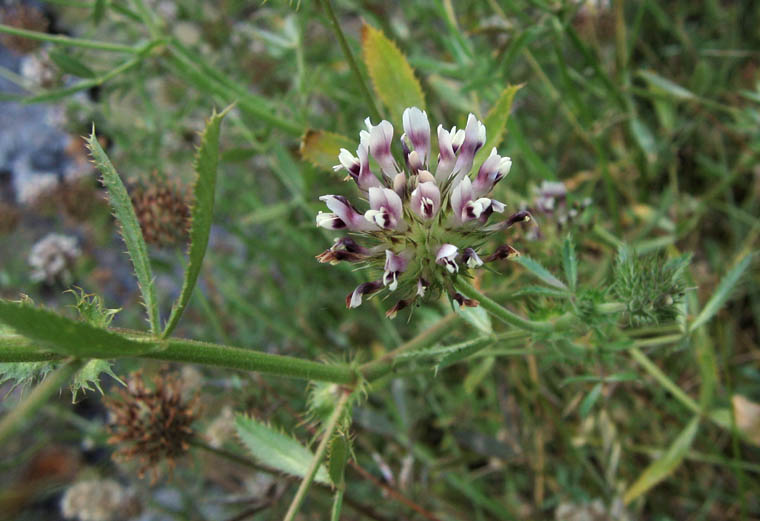

Scientific classification
- Kingdom: Plantae
- Clade: Tracheophytes
- Clade: Angiosperms
- Clade: Eudicots
- Clade: Rosids
- Order: Fabales
- Family: Fabaceae
- Subfamily: Faboideae
- Genus: Trifolium
- Species: T. obtusiflorum

Binomial name
- Trifolium obtusiflorum Hook.f.

= Trifolium obtusiflorum =

Species of legume

Trifolium obtusiflorum is a species of clover known by the common name clammy clover.

== Description ==
Trifolium obtusiflorum is an annual herb growing erect in form. It is hairy, glandular, and sticky in texture. The leaves are made up of sharply toothed, pointed oval leaflets up to 4 centimeters (1 1/2 in) in length.

The inflorescence is a head of flowers up to 3 cm (1 1/8 in) wide with a base of toothed bracts. Each flower has a calyx of sepals with lobes narrowing into bristles. The flower corolla may be nearly 2 cm long and is pink and purple with a white tip.

== Distribution and habitat ==
It is native to California in the Peninsular, Transverse, Sierra Nevada, and the California Coast Ranges and Cascade Range into southwestern Oregon.

It grows in moist habitat such as marshes and streambanks, and disturbed areas.
