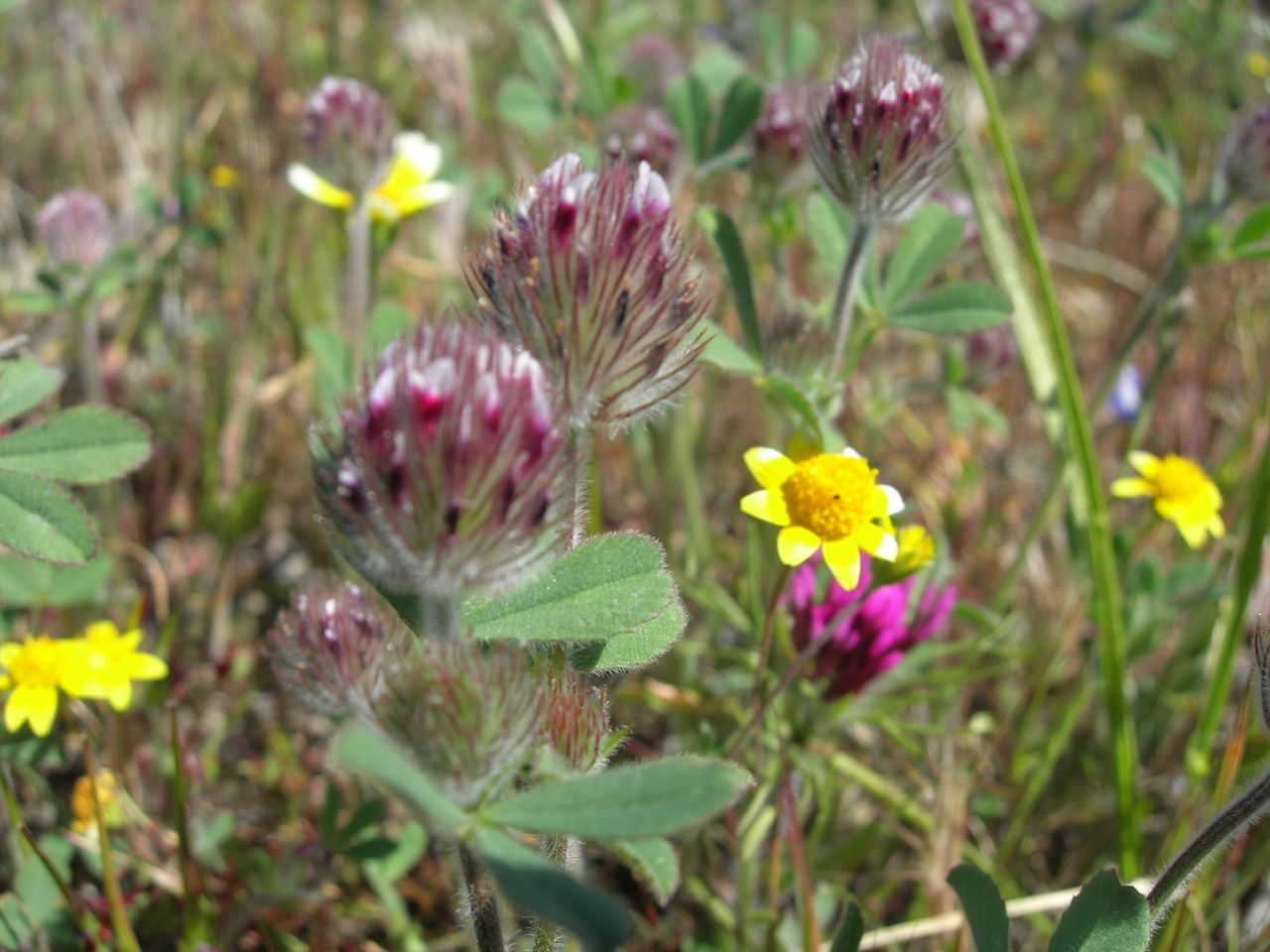
- with Lasthenia californica

Scientific classification
- Kingdom: Plantae
- Clade: Embryophytes
- Clade: Tracheophytes
- Clade: Spermatophytes
- Clade: Angiosperms
- Clade: Eudicots
- Clade: Rosids
- Order: Fabales
- Family: Fabaceae
- Subfamily: Faboideae
- Genus: Trifolium
- Species: T. albopurpureum

Binomial name
- Trifolium albopurpureum Torr. & A.Gray

= Trifolium albopurpureum =

Species of flowering plant

Trifolium albopurpureum is a species of clover known by the common name rancheria clover.

== Description ==
Trifolium albopurpureum is an annual herb growing decumbent or erect in form. The leaflets are 1 to 3 centimetres (1/2 to 1 1/4 in) long, and the herbage is hairy.

The inflorescence is a spike of flowers measuring 0.5 to 2 cm (1/4 to 3/4 in) wide. Each flower has a group of sepals (a calyx) with narrow lobes that taper into a bristle-shaped point and are coated in long hairs. Within the calyx is the flower corolla, which is purple and white in color.

=== Subspecies ===
Trifolium albopurpureum is often discussed as comprising three varieties. These are:

- Trifolium albopurpureum var. albopurpureum
- Trifolium albopurpureum var. dichotomum
- Trifolium albopurpureum var. olivaceum

== Distribution and habitat ==
It is native to the west coast of North America from British Columbia, California and the Sierra Nevada to Baja California. It can be found in a wide variety of habitats, including chaparral and woodlands, grasslands, forests, and montane locales.
