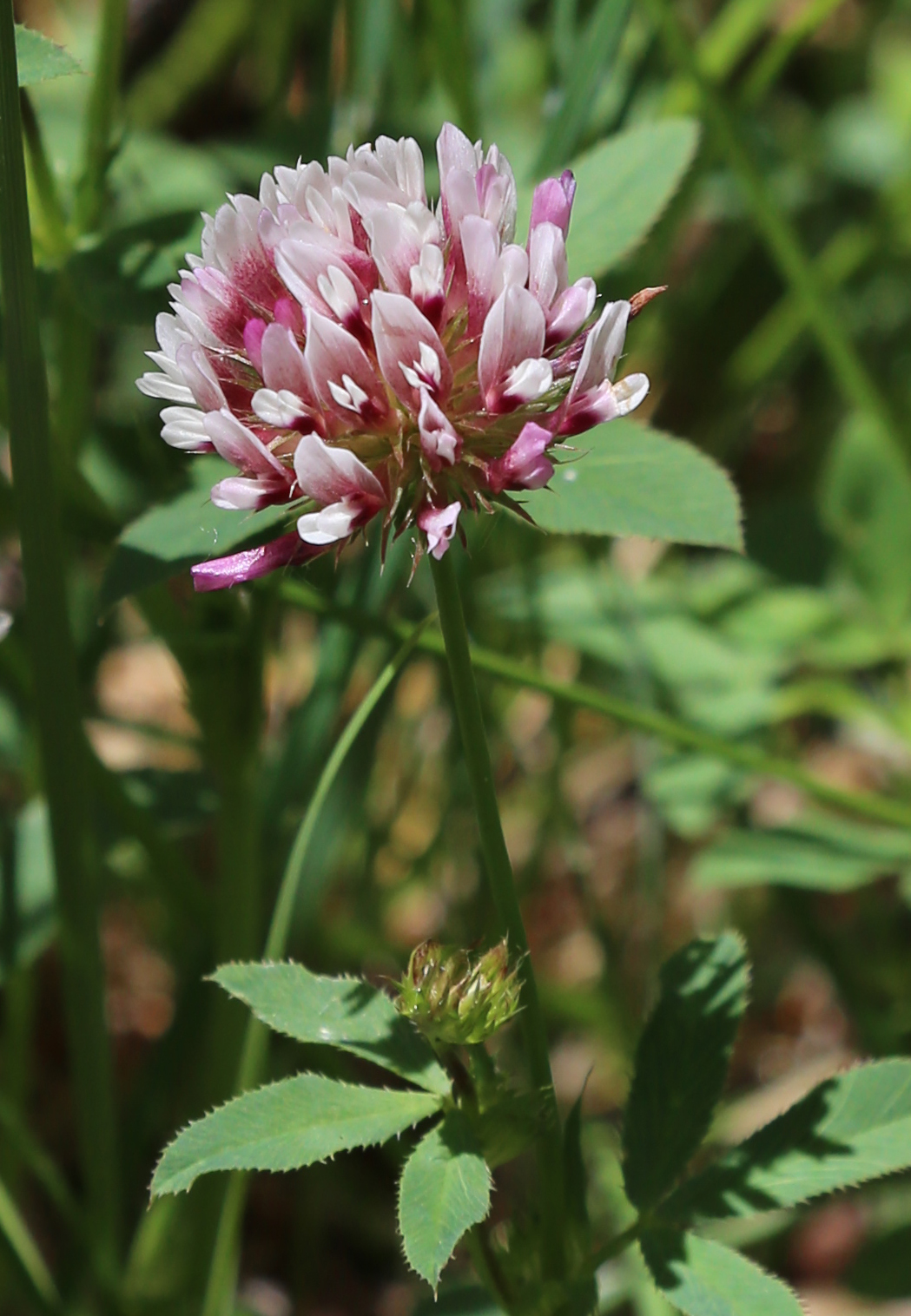

Conservation status
- Secure (NatureServe)

Scientific classification
- Kingdom: Plantae
- Clade: Tracheophytes
- Clade: Angiosperms
- Clade: Eudicots
- Clade: Rosids
- Order: Fabales
- Family: Fabaceae
- Subfamily: Faboideae
- Genus: Trifolium
- Species: T. longipes

Binomial name
- Trifolium longipes Nutt.

Subspecies
- Trifolium longipes subsp. atrorubens (Greene) J.M.Gillett; Trifolium longipes subsp. caurinum (Piper) J.M.Gillett; Trifolium longipes subsp. elmeri (Greene) J.M.Gillett; Trifolium longipes subsp. hansenii (Greene) J.M.Gillett; Trifolium longipes subsp. longipes; Trifolium longipes subsp. multipedunculatum (P.B.Kenn.) J.M.Gillett; Trifolium longipes subsp. neurophyllum (Greene) J.M.Gillett; Trifolium longipes subsp. oreganum (Howell) J.M.Gillett; Trifolium longipes subsp. pedunculatum (Rydb.) J.M.Gillett; Trifolium longipes subsp. pygmaeum (A.Gray) J.M.Gillett; Trifolium longipes subsp. reflexum (A.Nelson) J.M.Gillett; Trifolium longipes subsp. shastense (House) J.M.Gillett

= Trifolium longipes =

Plant species in the pea family

Trifolium longipes is a species of clover known by the common name longstalk clover.

It is a perennial herb with leaves made up of 2 to 5 leaflets which vary in shape. The inflorescence is a head of flowers up to 3 centimeters (1 1/4 in) wide with white to purplish or bicolored corollas. There are many subspecies and varieties which exist in different regions and differ slightly in appearance.

The species is native to the western United States, where it occurs in many types of habitats such as meadows, valleys, lower mountains, and subalpine slopes.
