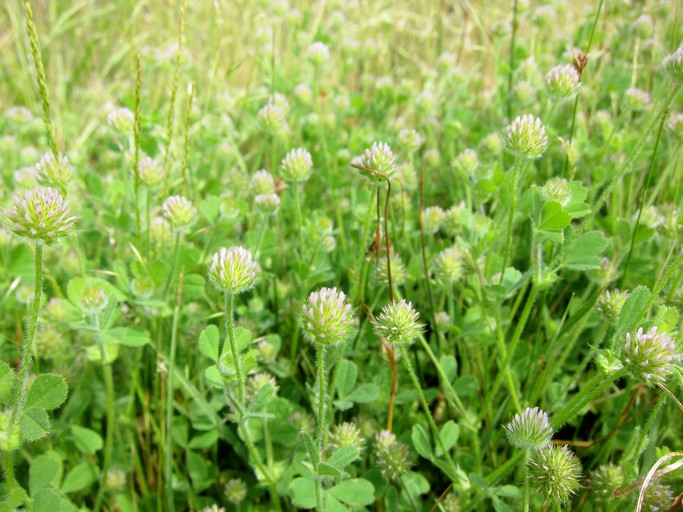

Conservation status
- Secure (NatureServe)

Scientific classification
- Kingdom: Plantae
- Clade: Tracheophytes
- Clade: Angiosperms
- Clade: Eudicots
- Clade: Rosids
- Order: Fabales
- Family: Fabaceae
- Subfamily: Faboideae
- Genus: Trifolium
- Species: T. microcephalum

Binomial name
- Trifolium microcephalum Pursh

= Trifolium microcephalum =

Species of legume

Trifolium microcephalum is a species of clover known by the common names smallhead clover and small-headed clover.

== Description ==
Trifolium microcephalum is an annual herb taking a decumbent or erect form. It is coated in hairs. The leaves are made up of oval leaflets with notched tips, each measuring up to 2 centimeters (3/4 in) long, and bristle-tipped stipules.

The inflorescence is a head of flowers borne in a bowl-like involucre of wide, hairy bracts. The head is not more than 1 cm wide. Each flower has a calyx of sepals with lobes narrowing into hairy bristles. The flower corolla is pinkish or purplish and measures 4 to 7 millimeters (1/8 to 1/4 in) in length.

== Distribution and habitat ==
It is native to western North America from southern Alaska and British Columbia to California, Montana, Arizona, and Baja California, where it occurs in many types of habitat, becoming common to abundant in some regions. It can grow in disturbed habitat and become a casual roadside weed.
