= Trifolium tembense =

Scientific classification
- Kingdom: Plantae
- Clade: Embryophytes
- Clade: Tracheophytes
- Clade: Spermatophytes
- Clade: Angiosperms
- Clade: Eudicots
- Clade: Rosids
- Order: Fabales
- Family: Fabaceae
- Subfamily: Faboideae
- Genus: Trifolium
- Species: T. tembense

Binomial name
- Trifolium tembense Fresen.

Synonyms
- Trifolium goetzenii Taub.; Trifolium umbellatum A.Rich.; Trifolium umbellulatum A.Rich.

Species of flowering plant

Trifolium tembense, the Tembien clover or African clover, is a species of flowering plant in the family Fabaceae, found in Eritrea, Ethiopia, Democratic Republic of the Congo, Rwanda, Uganda, Kenya, and Tanzania. A locally important forage species, it thrives in wet areas, often growing in shallow water.
