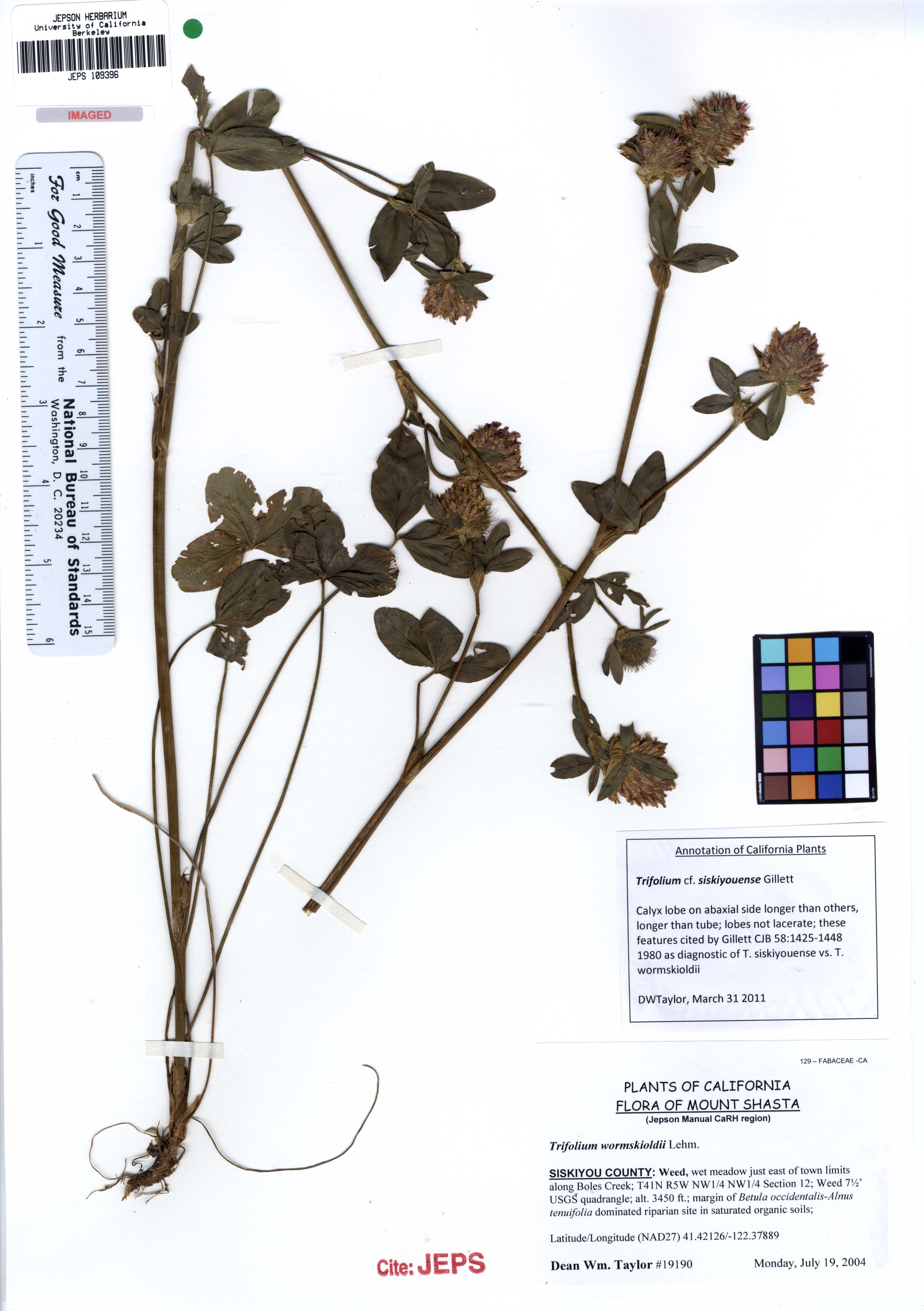

Scientific classification
- Kingdom: Plantae
- Clade: Tracheophytes
- Clade: Angiosperms
- Clade: Eudicots
- Clade: Rosids
- Order: Fabales
- Family: Fabaceae
- Subfamily: Faboideae
- Genus: Trifolium
- Species: T. siskiyouense

Binomial name
- Trifolium siskiyouense J.M.Gillett

Synonyms
- Trifolium wormskioldii var. siskiyouense (J.M.Gillett) Isely

= Trifolium siskiyouense =

Species of legume

Trifolium siskiyouense, the Siskiyou clover, is a clover species endemic to the Klamath Mountains in the western United States.

== Description ==
Trifolium siskiyouenseis a glabrous, perennial herb with thickened roots but no rhizomes. The leaves are trifoliate with lanceolate stipules; the leaflets are elliptic to oblanceolate, up to 3 centimeters (1 1/4 in) long. The flowers are white to cream-colored.

== Distribution and habitat ==
The plant species is native to northwestern California and southwestern Oregon, in the Klamath Mountains. It is reported from only 5 counties: Shasta and Siskiyou Counties in California; and Josephine, Douglas and Jackson Counties in Oregon.

The type specimen was collected in 1904 near Grants Pass in Josephine County, Oregon. Part of its range is protected within the Klamath National Forest.

The plant grows in wet mountain meadows at elevations of 800–1,400 meters (2,600–4,600 ft).
