= Trifolium breweri =

Scientific classification
- Kingdom: Plantae
- Clade: Tracheophytes
- Clade: Angiosperms
- Clade: Eudicots
- Clade: Rosids
- Order: Fabales
- Family: Fabaceae
- Subfamily: Faboideae
- Genus: Trifolium
- Species: T. breweri

Binomial name
- Trifolium breweri S.Watson

Species of flowering plant

Trifolium breweri, which has the common names forest clover and Brewer's clover, is a perennial clover in the family Fabaceae. The species is native to mixed evergreen forests and coastal coniferous forests in Southern Oregon and California.

== Description ==
Trifolium breweri is a mat forming perennial herb that grows upright or decumbent in form, with dense, hairy herbage. The leaves are cauline, each with three obovate leaflets that are generally 5–20 millimeters (1/4–3/4 in), and can be either entire or serrate.

The inflorescence is umbel-like with 5–15 flowers, and is often turned to the side. The flowers are small, bilaterally symmetrical, and range from yellowish white to pink-lavender. Flowers consist of a five lobed, hairy calyx, petals are separate, and the corolla is papilionaceous. The banner petal is lanceolate, wing petals are narrow and oblanceolate to oblong, wing tips and keel tips are obtuse or rounded. They have diadelphous stamens, nine of which are united and one free. After pollination a fruit containing one seed is exserted from corolla.

== Taxonomy ==
In a 2013 study about New World clovers found in montane regions, T. breweri is mentioned briefly as being basal within the Involucrarium clade with some of the South American species that were studied.

Another study done on the molecular phylogenetics of the clover genus mentions T. breweri. 218 species of Trifolium were collected and sequenced in California. The results of the study were consistent with a Mediterranean origin of the genus, probably in the Early Miocene. They believe that all of the New World species had a single origin, while the species of sub-Saharan Africa originated from three separate dispersal events.

== Distribution and habitat ==
Trifolium breweri is found in southern Oregon and California. It grows in the Klamath Range, Cascades Range and Sierra Nevada.

It is a highly adaptive plant that thrives in mixed evergreen forests and coastal coniferous. It can also survive in open areas and even roadsides at elevations between 200–1,800 meters (660–5,910 ft).

== Conservation ==
This plant is considered to be secure within its range.
