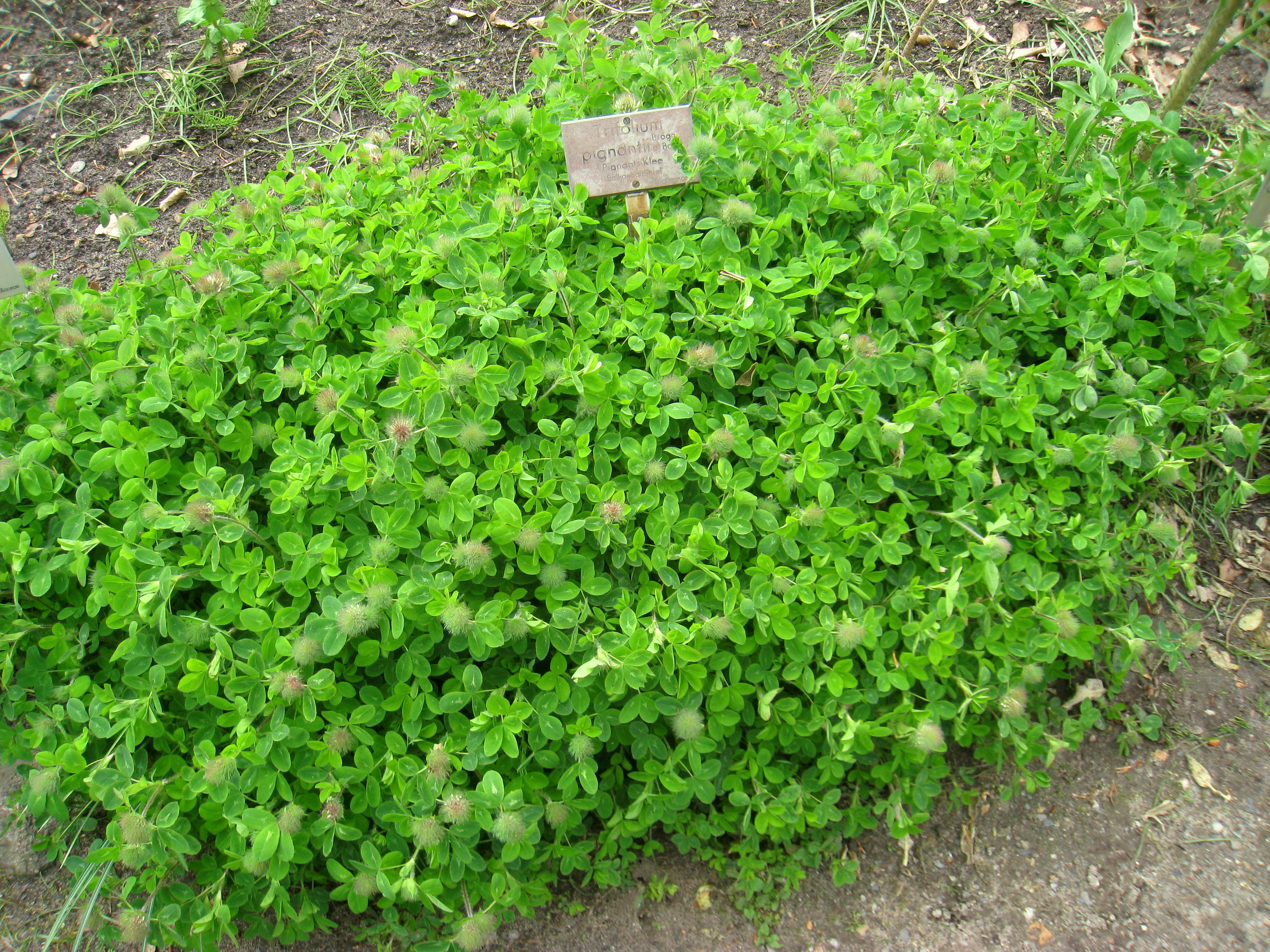
- Trifolium pignantii

Scientific classification
- Kingdom: Plantae
- Clade: Tracheophytes
- Clade: Angiosperms
- Clade: Eudicots
- Clade: Rosids
- Order: Fabales
- Family: Fabaceae
- Subfamily: Faboideae
- Genus: Trifolium
- Species: T. pignantii

Binomial name
- Trifolium pignantii Fauche & Chaub.

= Trifolium pignantii =

Species of legume

Trifolium pignantii is a species of clover in the pea family Fabaceae, native to Albania, Bulgaria, the former Yugoslavia, and Greece.
