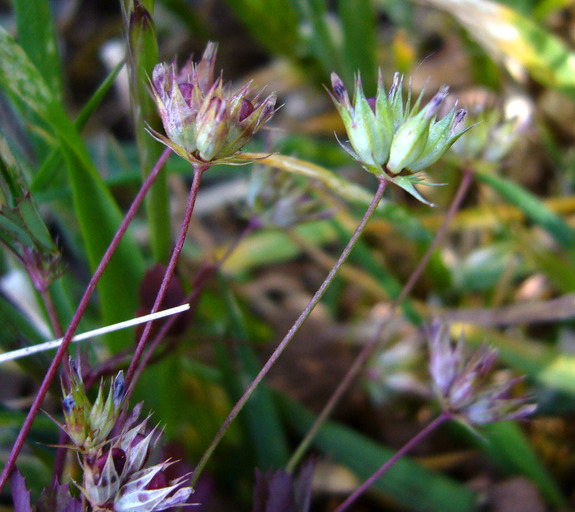

Scientific classification
- Kingdom: Plantae
- Clade: Tracheophytes
- Clade: Angiosperms
- Clade: Eudicots
- Clade: Rosids
- Order: Fabales
- Family: Fabaceae
- Subfamily: Faboideae
- Genus: Trifolium
- Species: T. oliganthum

Binomial name
- Trifolium oliganthum Steud.

= Trifolium oliganthum =

Species of legume

Trifolium oliganthum is a species of clover known by the common name fewflower clover.

== Description ==
Trifolium oliganthum is an annual herb growing upright in form. The leaves are made up of variously shaped leaflets measuring 1 to 2 centimeters (1/2 to 3/4 in) in length, and toothed stipules.

The inflorescence is a head of flowers no more than 1 cm wide. At its base is a fused involucre of bracts. Each flower has a calyx of sepals which may have a forked tip. The flower corolla is under 1 cm in length.

== Distribution and habitat ==
The species is native to western coastal and montane North America from British Columbia to California, the Sierra Nevada, and to Baja California, where it occurs in many types of habitat.
