= Trifolium squarrosum =

Scientific classification
- Kingdom: Plantae
- Clade: Tracheophytes
- Clade: Angiosperms
- Clade: Eudicots
- Clade: Rosids
- Order: Fabales
- Family: Fabaceae
- Subfamily: Faboideae
- Genus: Trifolium
- Species: T. squarrosum

Binomial name
- Trifolium squarrosum L.

Synonyms
- Trifolium dipsaceum

Species of plant

Trifolium squarrosum is a species of annual herb in the family Fabaceae. They have a self-supporting growth form and compound, broad leaves.

The plant is allelopathic, producing chemicals which suppress the growth of other plants nearby. This may make it useful as a companion plant, reducing the need for artificial weedkillers.

== Sources ==
This article incorporates text from a free content work. Licensed under CC0 (license statement/permission). Text taken from Trifolium squarrosum. Encyclopedia of Life.
