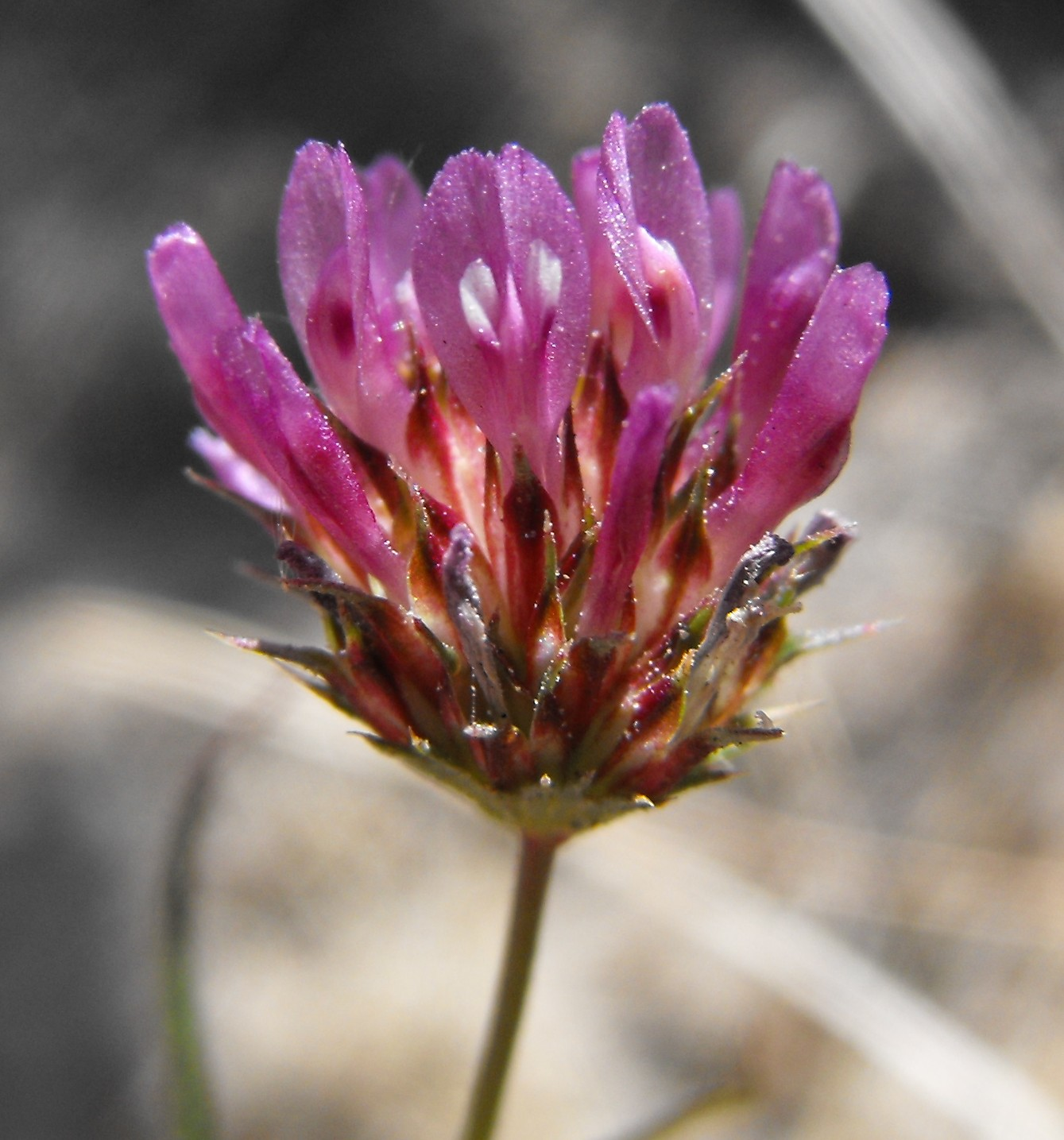

Scientific classification
- Kingdom: Plantae
- Clade: Embryophytes
- Clade: Tracheophytes
- Clade: Spermatophytes
- Clade: Angiosperms
- Clade: Eudicots
- Clade: Rosids
- Order: Fabales
- Family: Fabaceae
- Subfamily: Faboideae
- Genus: Trifolium
- Species: T. ciliolatum

Binomial name
- Trifolium ciliolatum Benth.

= Trifolium ciliolatum =

Species of flowering plant

Trifolium ciliolatum is a species of clover known by the common name foothill clover.

== Description ==
It is an annual herb growing erect in form, with hairless herbage. The leaves are made up of toothed oval leaflets and have bristle-tipped stipules. The inflorescence is a head of flowers 1–2 centimeters (1/2–3/4 in) wide, the flowers often spreading out or drooping. The flower has a calyx of bristle-like sepals lined with hairs and a pinkish or purplish corolla.

== Distribution and habitat ==
The species is native to western North America from Washington to Baja California.

It is a common plant of many regions, including disturbed habitat.

== Uses ==
The seeds and vegetation of this plant were a common food of many local Native American groups.
