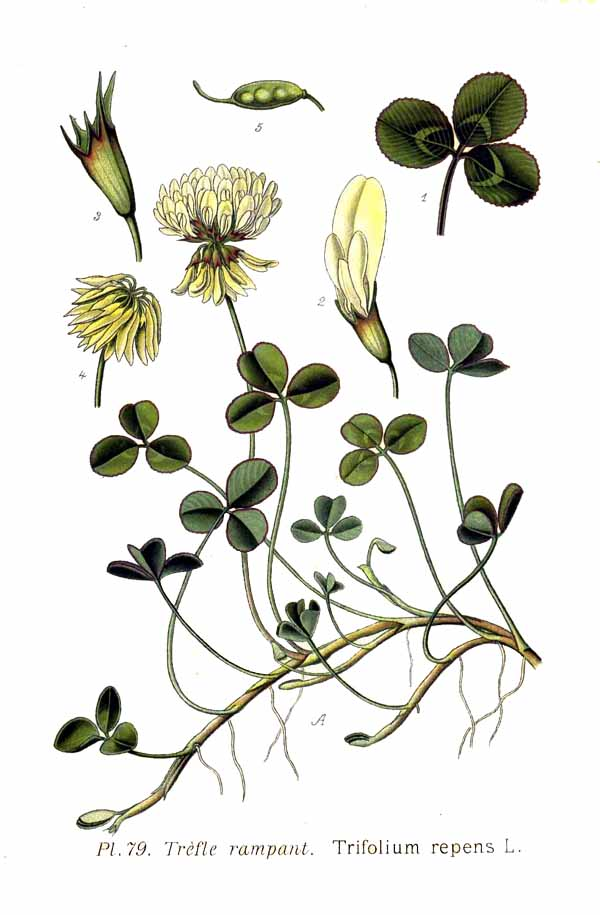
- Trifolium repens (white clover)

Scientific classification
- Kingdom: Plantae
- Clade: Tracheophytes
- Clade: Angiosperms
- Clade: Eudicots
- Clade: Rosids
- Order: Fabales
- Family: Fabaceae
- Subfamily: Faboideae
- Clade: Inverted repeat-lacking clade
- Tribe: Trifolieae
- Genus: Trifolium; L.

Subgenera and sections
- List: subg. Chronosemium subg. Trifolium sect. Glycyrrhizum sect. Involucrarium sect. Lupinaster sect. Paramesus sect. Trichocephalum sect. Trifoliastrum sect. Trifolium sect. Vesicastrum

Synonyms
- List: Amarenus C.Presl (1831); Amoria C.Presl (1831); Bobrovia A.P.Khokhr. (1998), nom. illeg.; Calycomorphum C.Presl (1831); Chrysaspis Desv. (1827); Dactiphyllon Raf. (1818); Dactiphyllum Raf. (1819); Falcatula Brot. (1816 publ. 1817); Galearia C.Presl (1831), nom. rej.; Lagopus Hill (1756); Lagopus Bernh. (1800), nom. illeg.; Lojaconoa Bobrov (1967); Loxospermum Hochst. (1846); Lupinaster Fabr. (1759); Micrantheum C.Presl (1831), nom. illeg.; Microphyton Fourr. (1868); Mistyllus C.Presl (1831); Ochreata (Lojac.) Bobrov (1967); Paramesus C.Presl (1831); Pentaphyllon Pers. (1807); Triphylloides Moench (1794); Ursia Vassilcz. (1979); Ursifolium Doweld (2003); Xerosphaera Soják (1985 publ. 1986)

= Clover =

Genus of legumes

Clovers, also called trefoils, are plants of the genus Trifolium (from Latin tres 'three' and folium 'leaf'). They are herbaceous plants growing up to 30 cm (12 in) tall. The leaves are usually trifoliate and the small flowers are reddish to white or yellow. Related genera with similar common names include Melilotus (sweet clover) and Medicago (burclover).

The genus consists of about 300 species in the legume family, Fabaceae. Originating in Europe, the genus has a cosmopolitan distribution. A number of wild and domestic animals consume the plants. Clovers have been cultivated by humans for over 1,000 years, valued for their nitrogen fixation, which fertilizes the soil and bolsters the productivity of rotated crops.

Some forms of the plant are culturally significant, including the shamrock, used to represent Ireland, and the four-leaf clover, associated with good luck. Specimens with other numbers of leaflets have been found, the record high of 63 being recorded in 2023.

== Description ==
They are small annual, biennial, or short-lived perennial herbaceous plants, typically growing up to 30 cm (12 in) tall. The leaves are trifoliate, but seldomly have more or less than three leaflets, being more rare the higher or lower the number. The stipules are adnate to the leaf-stalk. Small red, purple, white, or yellow flowers appear in heads or dense spikes. The small, few-seeded pods are enclosed in the calyx.

Other closely related genera often called clovers include Melilotus (sweet clover) and Medicago (burclover), including the species alfalfa and Calvary clover.

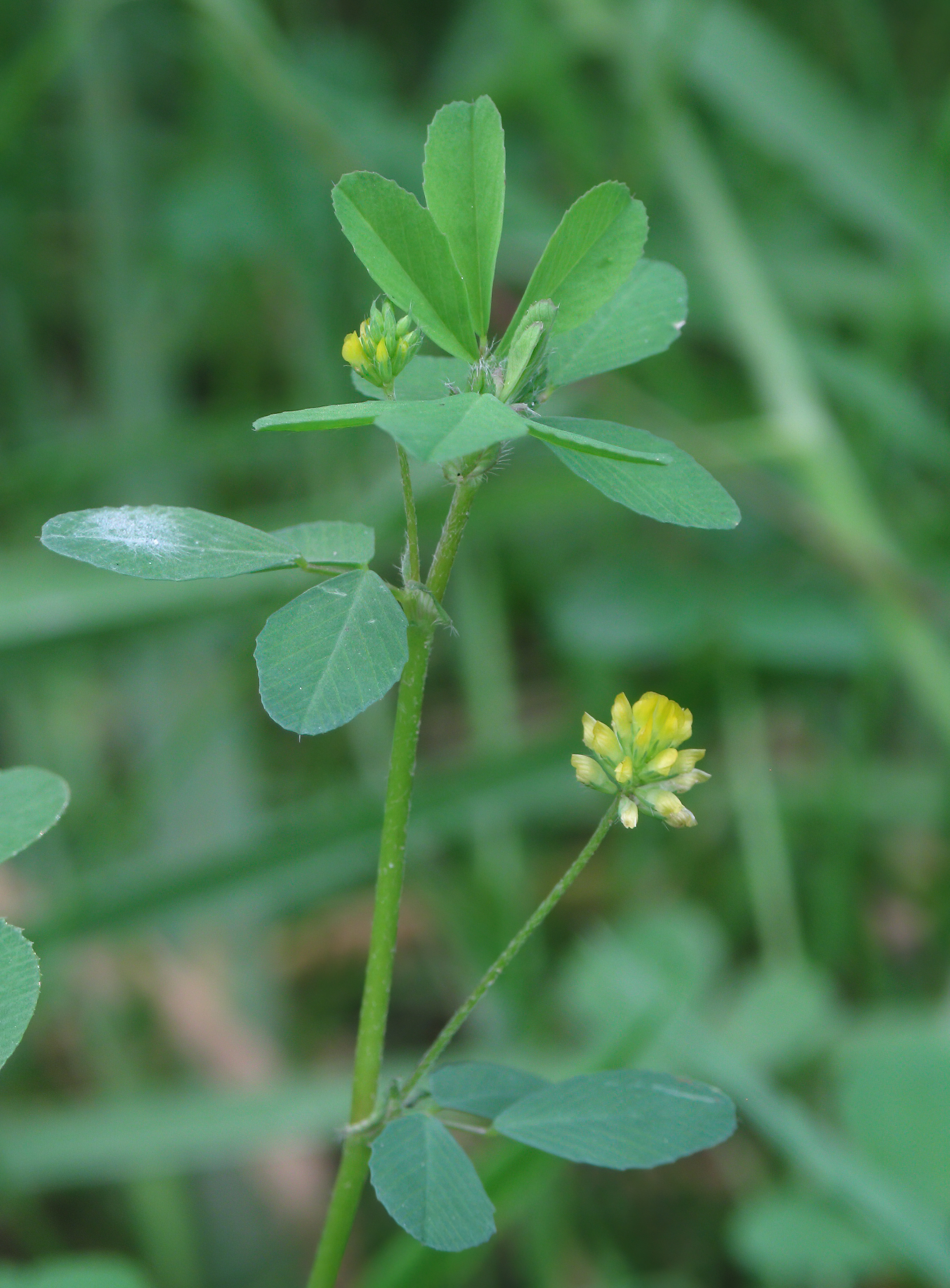
Trifolium dubium (lesser hop trefoil)

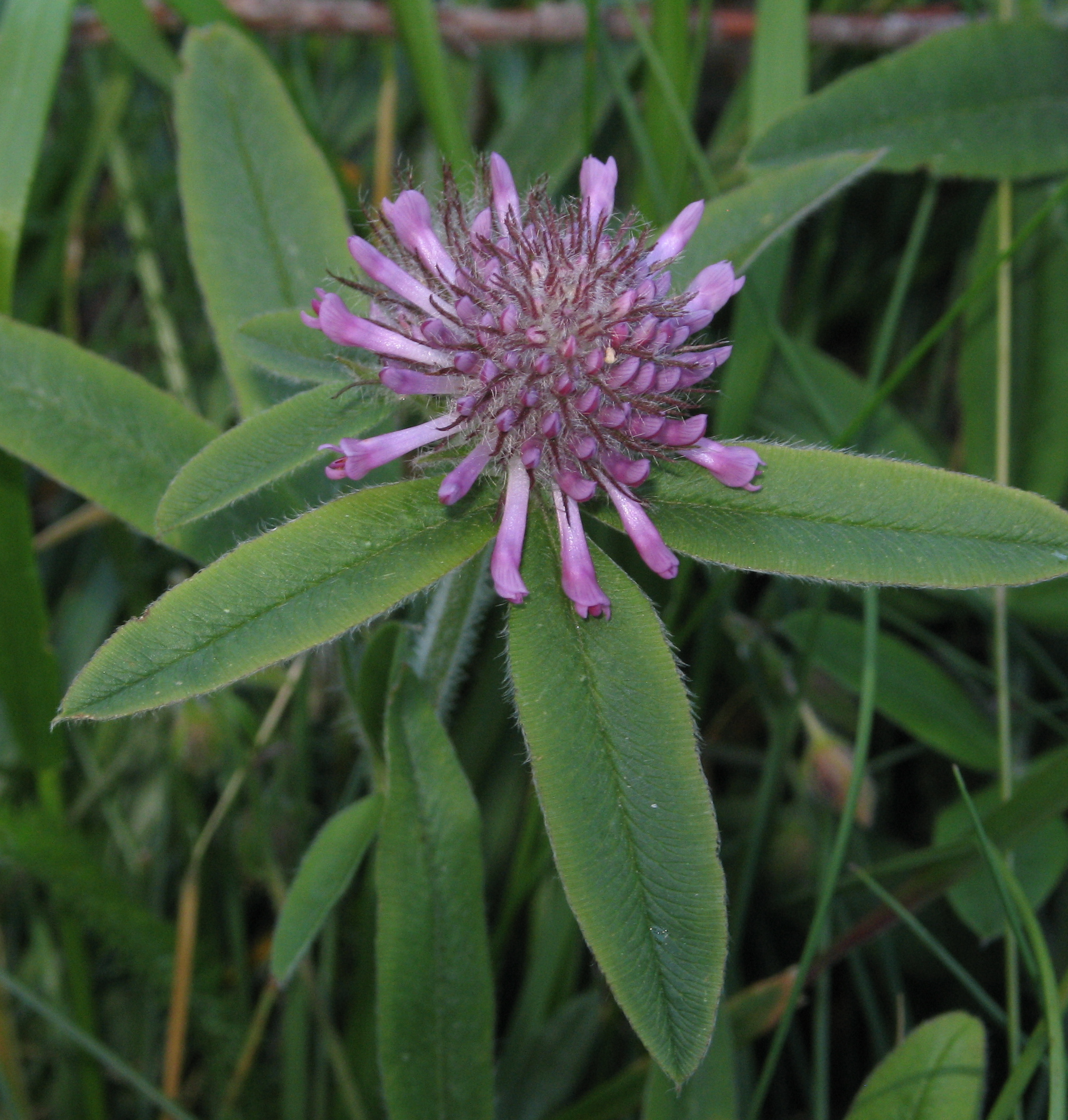
Flower and leaves of T. alpestre (owl-head clover)

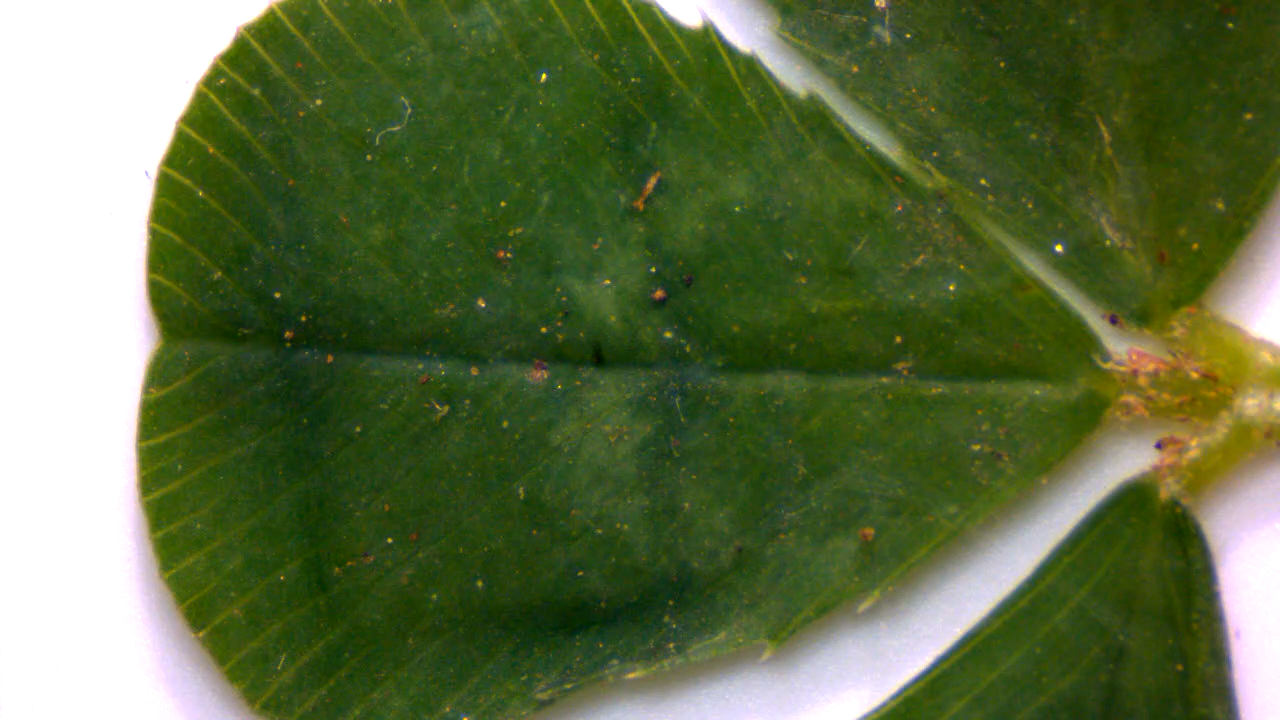
Top of Trifolium repens (white clover) leaf showing leaf structure and characteristics.

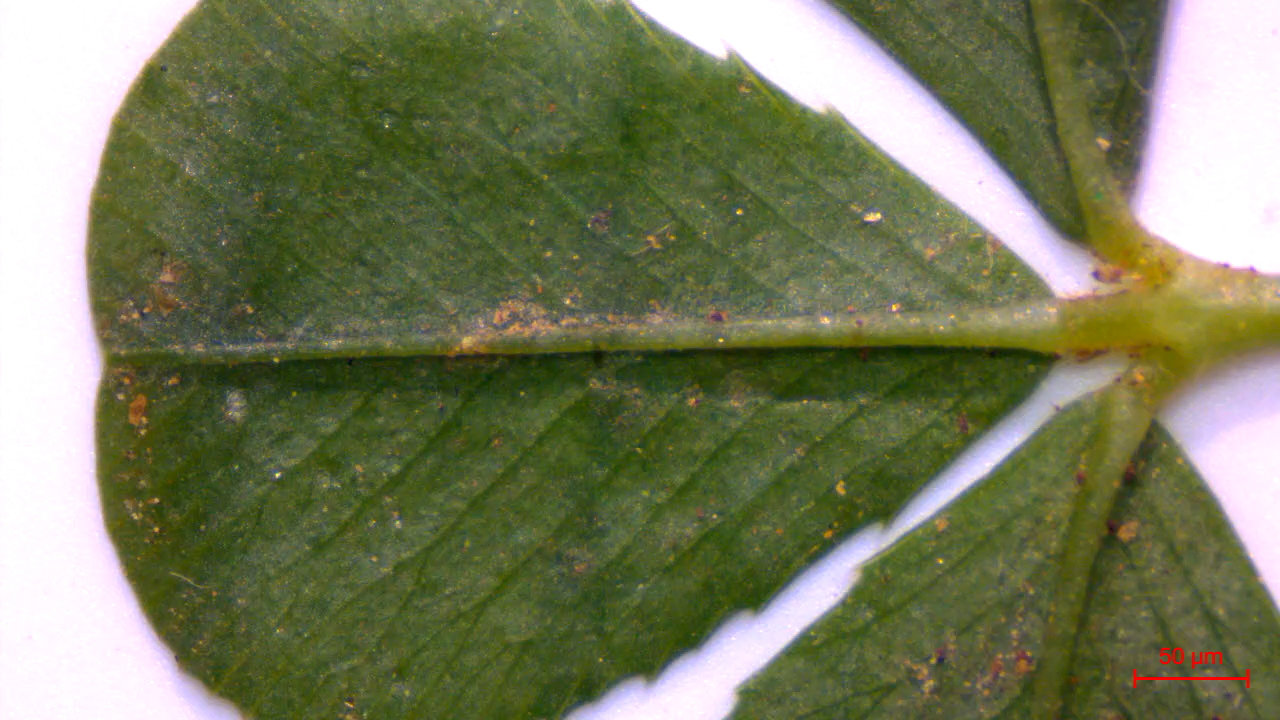
Bottom of Trifolium repens (white clover) leaf.

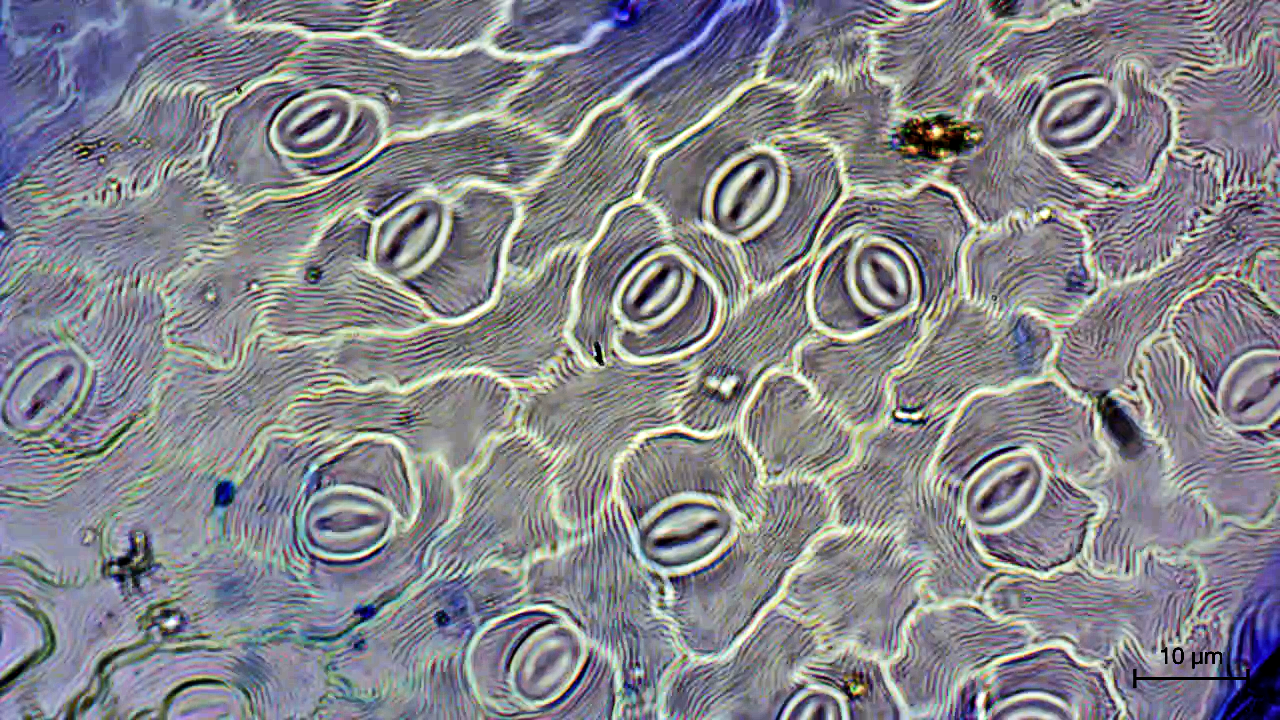
Bottom of clover leaf showing epidermal cells and stomata.

== Taxonomy ==
=== Phylogeny ===
The first extensive classification of Trifolium had been done by Michael Zohary and David Heller, and it was subsequently released in 1984. They divided the genus into eight sections: Lotoidea, Paramesus, Mistyllus, Vesicamridula, Chronosemium, Trifolium, Trichoecephalum, and Involucrarium, with Lotoidea placed most basally. Within this classification system, Trifolium repens falls within section Lotoidea, the largest and least heterogeneous section. Lotoidea contains species from America, Africa, and Eurasia, considered a clade because of their inflorescence shape, floral structure, and legume that protrudes from the calyx. However, these traits are not unique to the section, and are shared with many other species in other sections. Zohary and Heller argued that the presence of these traits in other sections proved the basal position of Lotoidea, because they were ancestral. Aside from considering this section basal, they did not propose relationships between other sections.

Since then, molecular data has both questioned and confirmed the proposed phylogeny from Zohary and Heller. A genus-wide molecular study has since proposed a new classification system, made up of two subgenera, Chronosemium and Trifolium. This recent reclassification further divides subgenus Trifolium into eight sections. The molecular data supports the monophyletic nature of three sections proposed by Zohary and Heller (Tripholium, Paramesus, and Trichoecepalum), but not of Lotoidea (members of this section have since been reclassified into five other sections). Other molecular studies, although smaller, support the need to reorganize Lotoidea.

=== Species ===
291 species of Trifolium are accepted:

- Trifolium absconditum Molinari
- Trifolium acaule Steud. ex A.Rich.
- Trifolium affine C.Presl
- Trifolium acutiflorum Murb.
- Trifolium × adulterinum Beyer
- Trifolium africanum Ser.
- Trifolium aintabense Boiss. & Hausskn.
- Trifolium albopurpureum Torr. & A. Gray – rancheria clover
- Trifolium alexandrinum L. – Egyptian clover, berseem clover
- Trifolium alpestre L. – owl-head clover
- Trifolium alpinum L. – alpine clover
- Trifolium alsadami Post
- Trifolium amabile Kunth
- Trifolium ambiguum M. Bieb.
- Trifolium amoenum Greene – showy Indian clover
- Trifolium amphianthum Torr. & A.Gray
- Trifolium andersonii A. Gray – Anderson's clover or fiveleaf clover
- Trifolium andinum Nutt. – Intermountain clover
- Trifolium andricum Lassen
- Trifolium angulatum Waldst. & Kit.
- Trifolium angustifolium L.
- Trifolium ankaratrense Bosser
- Trifolium apertum Bobrov
- Trifolium appendiculatum Lojac.
- Trifolium argutum Banks & Sol.
- Trifolium arvense L. – hare's-foot clover
- Trifolium attenuatum Greene
- Trifolium aureum Pollich – large hop trefoil
- Trifolium baccarinii Chiov.
- Trifolium badium Schreb.
- Trifolium barbigerum Torr. – bearded clover
- Trifolium barbulatum (Freyn & Sint.) Zohary
- Trifolium barnebyi (Isely) Dorn & Lichvar
- Trifolium batmanicum Katzn.
- Trifolium beckwithii W.H.Brewer ex S.Watson – Beckwith's clover
- Trifolium bejariense Moric.
- Trifolium × bertrandii Rouy
- Trifolium berytheum Boiss. & C.I.Blanche
- Trifolium biebersteinii Khalilov
- Trifolium bifidum A.Gray – notchleaf clover
- Trifolium bilineatum Fresen.
- Trifolium billardierei Spreng.
- Trifolium bithynicum Boiss.
- Trifolium bivonae Guss.
- Trifolium blancheanum Boiss.
- Trifolium bobrovii Khalilov
- Trifolium bocconei Savi
- Trifolium boissieri Guss.
- Trifolium bolanderi A.Gray
- Trifolium bordsilovskyi Grossh.
- Trifolium brandegeei S.Watson
- Trifolium breweri S. Watson – forest clover
- Trifolium brutium Ten.
- Trifolium buckwestiorum Isely – Santa Cruz clover
- Trifolium bullatum Boiss. & Hausskn.
- Trifolium burchellianum Ser.
- Trifolium calcaricum J.L.Collins & Wieboldt
- Trifolium calocephalum Fresen.
- Trifolium campestre Schreb. – hop trefoil
- Trifolium canescens Willd.
- Trifolium carolinianum Michx.
- Trifolium caudatum Boiss.
- Trifolium cernuum Brot.
- Trifolium cheranganiense J.B.Gillett
- Trifolium cherleri L.
- Trifolium chilaloense Thulin
- Trifolium chilense Hook. & Arn.
- Trifolium chlorotrichum Boiss. & Balansa
- Trifolium ciliolatum Benth. – foothill clover
- Trifolium circumdatum Kunze
- Trifolium clusii Godr.
- Trifolium clypeatum L.
- Trifolium congestum Guss.
- Trifolium constantinopolitanum Ser.
- Trifolium cryptopodium Steud. ex A. Rich.
- Trifolium cyathiferum Lindl. – cup clover
- Trifolium dalmaticum Vis.
- Trifolium dasyphyllum Torr. & A.Gray
- Trifolium dasyurum C.Presl
- Trifolium davisii E.Hossain
- Trifolium decorum Chiov.
- Trifolium dedeckerae J.M.Gillett
- Trifolium depauperatum Desv. – cowbag clover, balloon sack clover, or poverty clover
- Trifolium dichotomum Hook. & Arn.
- Trifolium dichroanthoides Rech.f.
- Trifolium dichroanthum Boiss.
- Trifolium diffusum Ehrh.
- Trifolium dolopium Heldr. & Hochst. ex Gibelli & Belli
- Trifolium douglasii House
- Trifolium dubium Sibth. – lesser hop trefoil
- Trifolium echinatum M.Bieb.
- Trifolium egrissicum Mikheev & Magulaev
- Trifolium elgonense J.B.Gillett
- Trifolium elizabethiae Grossh.
- Trifolium eriocephalum Nutt. – woollyhead clover
- Trifolium eriosphaerum Boiss.
- Trifolium erubescens Fenzl
- Trifolium euxinum Zohary
- Trifolium eximium Stephan ex Ser.
- Trifolium farayense Mouterde
- Trifolium fergan-karaeri M.Keskin
- Trifolium fontanum Bobrov
- Trifolium fragiferum L. – strawberry clover
- Trifolium friscanum (S.L.Welsh) S.L.Welsh
- Trifolium fucatum Lindl. – bull clover or sour clover
- Trifolium gemellum Pourr. ex Willd.
- Trifolium gillettianum Jacq.-Fél.
- Trifolium glanduliferum Boiss.
- Trifolium globosum L.
- Trifolium glomeratum L. – clustered clover or bush clover
- Trifolium gordeievii (Kom.) Z.Wei
- Trifolium gracilentum Torr. & A.Gray – pinpoint clover
- Trifolium grandiflorum Schreb.
- Trifolium gymnocarpon Nutt. – hollyleaf clover
- Trifolium hatschbachii Vincent & Butterworth
- Trifolium haussknechtii Boiss.
- Trifolium haydenii Porter
- Trifolium heldreichianum (Gibelli & Belli) Hausskn.
- Trifolium hickeyi T.K.Ahlq. & Vincent
- Trifolium hirtum All. – rose clover
- Trifolium howellii S.Watson – canyon clover or Howell's clover
- Trifolium humile Ball
- Trifolium hybridum L. – Alsike clover
- Trifolium hydrophilum Greene
- Trifolium incarnatum L. – crimson clover
- Trifolium infamia-ponertii Greuter
- Trifolium israeliticum Zohary & Katzn.
- Trifolium isthmocarpum Brot.
- Trifolium jokerstii Vincent & Rand.Morgan
- Trifolium juliani Batt.
- Trifolium kentuckiense Chapel & Vincent
- Trifolium kingii S.Watson
- Trifolium lanceolatum (J.B.Gillett) J.B.Gillett
- Trifolium lappaceum L.
- Trifolium latifolium (Hook.) Greene
- Trifolium latinum Sebast.
- Trifolium leibergii A.Nelson & J.F.Macbr. – Leiberg's clover
- Trifolium lemmonii S.Watson – Lemmon's clover
- Trifolium leucanthum M.Bieb.
- Trifolium ligusticum Balb. ex Loisel.
- Trifolium longidentatum Nábelek
- Trifolium longipes Nutt. – longstalk clover
- Trifolium lucanicum Gasp.
- Trifolium lugardii Bullock
- Trifolium lupinaster L.
- Trifolium macilentum Greene
- Trifolium macraei Hook. & Arn. – Chilean clover, double-head clover, or MacRae's clover
- Trifolium macrocephalum (Pursh) Poir. – largehead clover
- Trifolium masaiense J.B.Gillett
- Trifolium mattirolianum Chiov.
- Trifolium mazanderanicum Rech.f.
- Trifolium medium L. – zigzag clover
- Trifolium meduseum C.I.Blanche ex Boiss.
- Trifolium meironense Zohary & Lerner
- Trifolium mesogitanum Boiss.
- Trifolium michaelis Greuter
- Trifolium michelianum Savi
- Trifolium micranthum Viv.
- Trifolium microcephalum Pursh – smallhead clover
- Trifolium microdon Hook. & Arn. – thimble clover
- Trifolium miegeanum Maire
- Trifolium minutissimum D.Heller & Zohary
- Trifolium modestum Boiss.
- Trifolium monanthum A.Gray – mountain carpet clover
- Trifolium montanum L.
- Trifolium multinerve A. Rich.
- Trifolium multistriatum W.D.J.Koch
- Trifolium mutabile Port.
- Trifolium nanum Torr.
- Trifolium nerimaniae M.Keskin
- Trifolium × neyrautii Rouy
- Trifolium nigrescens Viv.
- Trifolium noricum Wulfen
- Trifolium obscurum Savi
- Trifolium obtusiflorum Hook. – clammy clover
- Trifolium occidentale Coombe
- Trifolium ochroleucon Huds. - sulphur clover
- Trifolium oliganthum Steud. – fewflower clover
- Trifolium olivaceum Greene
- Trifolium orbelicum Velen.
- Trifolium ornithopodioides L.
- Trifolium owyheense Gilkey
- Trifolium pachycalyx Zohary
- Trifolium palaestinum Boiss.
- Trifolium pallescens Schreb.
- Trifolium pallidum Waldst. & Kit.
- Trifolium palmeri S.Watson
- Trifolium pamphylicum Boiss. & Heldr.
- Trifolium pannonicum Jacq. – Hungarian clover
- Trifolium parnassi Boiss. & Spruner
- Trifolium parryi A.Gray
- Trifolium patens Schreb.
- Trifolium patulum Tausch
- Trifolium pauciflorum d'Urv.
- Trifolium × permixtum Neuman
- Trifolium peruvianum Vogel
- Trifolium philistaeum Zohary
- Trifolium phitosianum N.Böhling, Greuter & Raus
- Trifolium phleoides Pourr. ex Willd.
- Trifolium physanthum Hook. & Arn.
- Trifolium physodes Steven ex M. Bieb.
- Trifolium pichisermollii J.B.Gillett
- Trifolium pignantii Fauché. & Chaub.
- Trifolium pilczii Adamović
- Trifolium pilulare Boiss.
- Trifolium piorkowskii Rand.Morgan & A.L.Barber
- Trifolium plebeium Boiss.
- Trifolium plumosum Douglas ex Hook.
- Trifolium polymorphum Poir.
- Trifolium polyodon Greene
- Trifolium polyphyllum C.A.Mey.
- Trifolium polystachyum Fresen.
- Trifolium praetermissum Greuter, Pleger & Raus.
- Trifolium pratense L. – red clover
- Trifolium productum Greene
- Trifolium prophetarum M. Hossain
- Trifolium pseudomedium Hausskn.
- Trifolium pseudostriatum Baker f.
- Trifolium pulchellum Schischk.
- Trifolium purpureum Loisel.
- Trifolium purseglovei J. B. Gillett
- Trifolium quartinianum A. Rich.
- Trifolium radicosum Boiss. & Hohen.
- Trifolium rechingeri Rothm.
- Trifolium reflexum L. – buffalo clover
- Trifolium repens L. – shamrock (white clover)
- Trifolium resupinatum L. – Persian clover, shaftal
- Trifolium retusum L.
- Trifolium × retyezaticum Nyár.
- Trifolium rhizomatosum O.Schwarz
- Trifolium rhombeum S.Schauer
- Trifolium riograndense Burkart
- Trifolium rollinsii J.M.Gillett
- Trifolium roussaeanum Boiss.
- Trifolium rubens L.
- Trifolium rueppellianum Fresen.
- Trifolium salmoneum Mouterde
- Trifolium sannineum Mouterde
- Trifolium sarosiense Hazsl.
- Trifolium saxatile All.
- Trifolium scabrum L.
- Trifolium schimperi (Hochst.) A.Rich.
- Trifolium schneideri Standl.
- Trifolium × schwarzii Wein
- Trifolium scutatum Boiss.
- Trifolium sebastiani Savi
- Trifolium semipilosum Fresen.
- Trifolium setiferum Boiss.
- Trifolium simense Fresen.
- Trifolium sintenisii Freyn
- Trifolium siskiyouense J.M.Gillett
- Trifolium somalense Taub. ex Harms
- Trifolium sonorense T.K.Ahlq. & Vincent
- Trifolium spadiceum L.
- Trifolium spananthum Thulin
- Trifolium spumosum L.
- Trifolium squamosum (or maritimum) L. – sea clover
- Trifolium squarrosum L.
- Trifolium stellatum L.
- Trifolium steudneri Schweinf.
- Trifolium stipulaceum Thunb.
- Trifolium stoloniferum Muhl. ex A. Eaton – running buffalo clover
- Trifolium stolzii Harms
- Trifolium striatum L. – knotted clover
- Trifolium strictum L.
- Trifolium subterraneum L. – subterranean clover
- Trifolium suffocatum L.
- Trifolium sylvaticum Gérard
- Trifolium tembense Fresen.
- Trifolium tenuifolium Ten.
- Trifolium thalii Vill.
- Trifolium thompsonii C.V.Morton – Thompson's clover
- Trifolium tomentosum L.
- Trifolium × traplii Domin
- Trifolium triaristatum Bertero ex Colla
- Trifolium trichocalyx A.Heller – Monterey clover
- Trifolium trichocephalum M. Bieb.
- Trifolium trichopterum Pančić
- Trifolium tumens Steven ex M.Bieb.
- Trifolium ukingense Harms
- Trifolium uniflorum L.
- Trifolium usambarense Taub.
- Trifolium variegatum Nutt. – whitetip clover
- Trifolium vavilovii Eig
- Trifolium velebiticum Degen
- Trifolium velenovskyi Vandas
- Trifolium vernum Phil.
- Trifolium vesiculosum Savi
- Trifolium vestitum D.Heller & Zohary
- Trifolium virginicum Small
- Trifolium wentzelianum Harms
- Trifolium wettsteinii Dörfl. & Hayek
- Trifolium wigginsii J. M. Gillett
- Trifolium willdenovii Spreng. − tomcat clover
- Trifolium wormskioldii Lehm. – cow clover
- Trifolium xanthinum Freyn

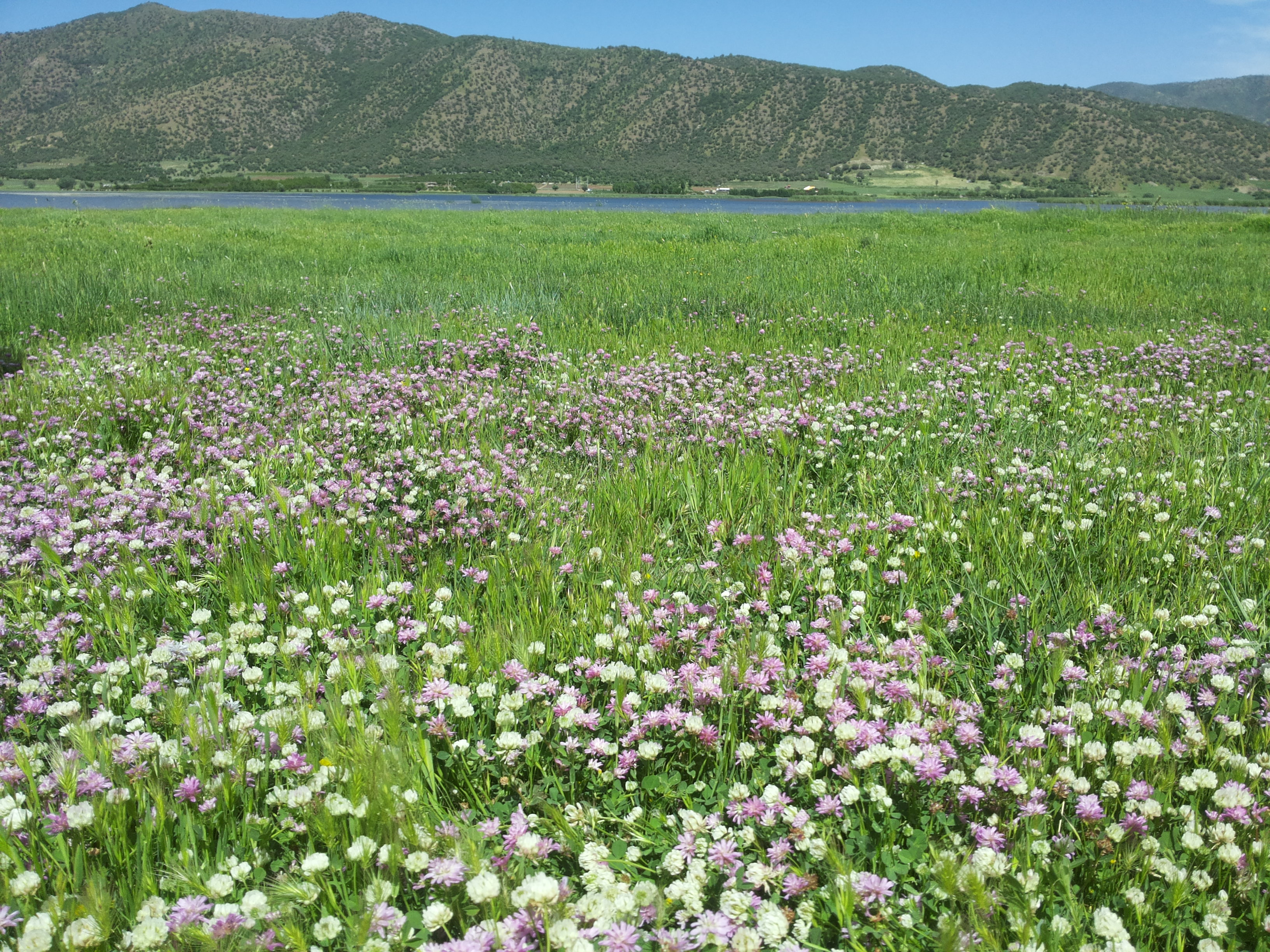
Clover flowers beside Zarivar Lake in Iran

== Distribution and habitat ==
Originating in Europe, the genus has a cosmopolitan distribution with the highest diversity in the temperate Northern Hemisphere, but many species also occur in South America and Africa, including at high altitudes on mountains in the tropics.

== Ecology ==
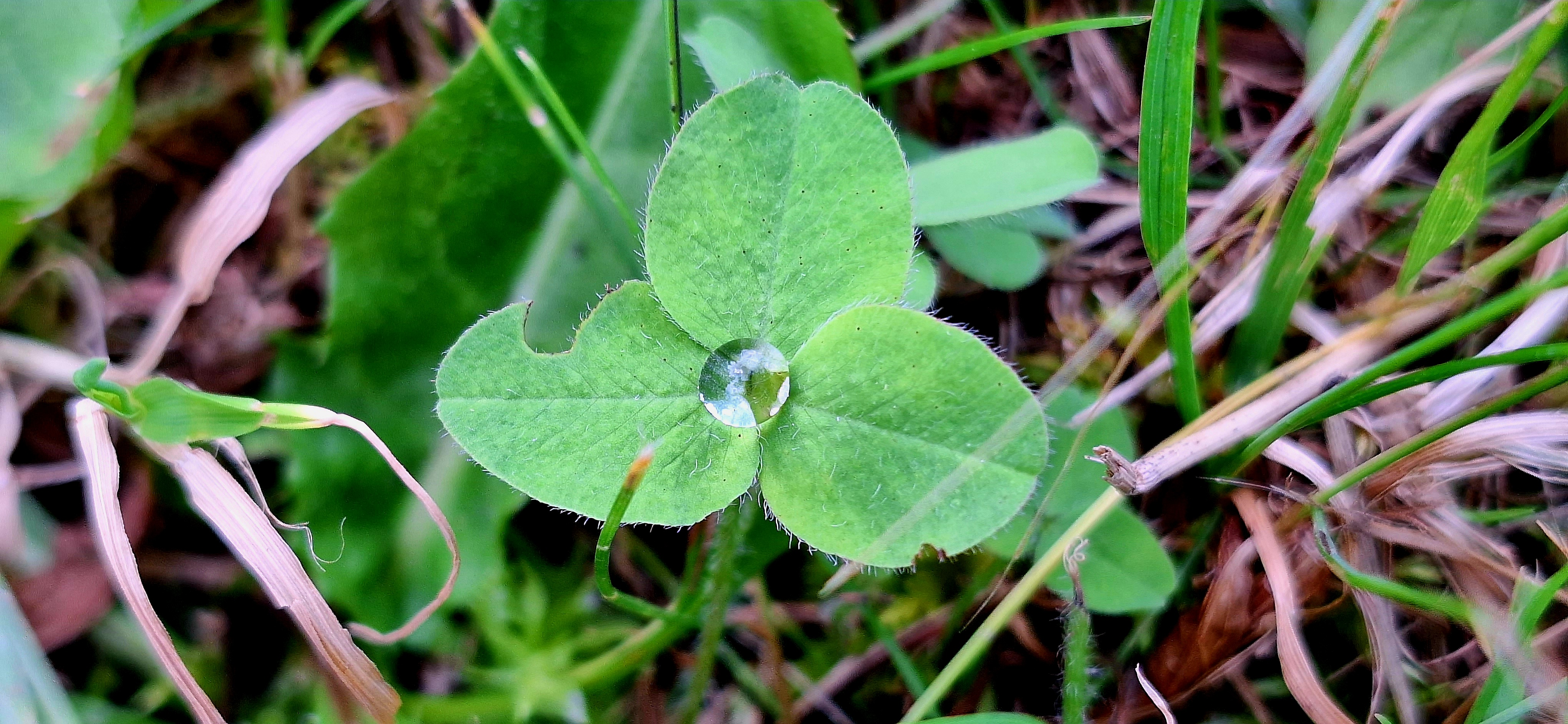
A clover with a dewdrop

Bears, game animals, ruminants and birds forage for and eat clover.

== Cultivation ==
=== Cultivation history ===
Clover was first domesticated in Spain in around the year 1000 CE. During European urbanization, crop rotations involving clover became essential for replacing the fixed nitrogen exported to cities as food. Increased soil nitrogen levels from the spreading use of clover were one of the main reasons why European agricultural production in 1880 was about 275% of the production in 1750. Fields of clover, used as forage and newly-invented silage, became an important part of the rural landscape; adding clover made livestock feed more nutritious. Honey production also rose drastically, and clover remained the main nectar source for bees until the mid-20th century. Clover was carried around the world as a crop by European colonists, and some clover species became invasive in some areas.

Imports of guano and the development of the Haber-Bosch process in the 20th century substantially displaced clover as a crop, with negative effects on pollinators, but in the 1990s and 2010s, the cost of industrially-fixed nitrogen rose substantially, approximately doubling, and reviving interest in forage mixes that include clover. As the fixation process is energy-intensive, prices are closely tied to energy prices. The 21st century has also seen interest in clover as a countermeasure to fight the global pollinator decline.

=== Modern cultivation ===
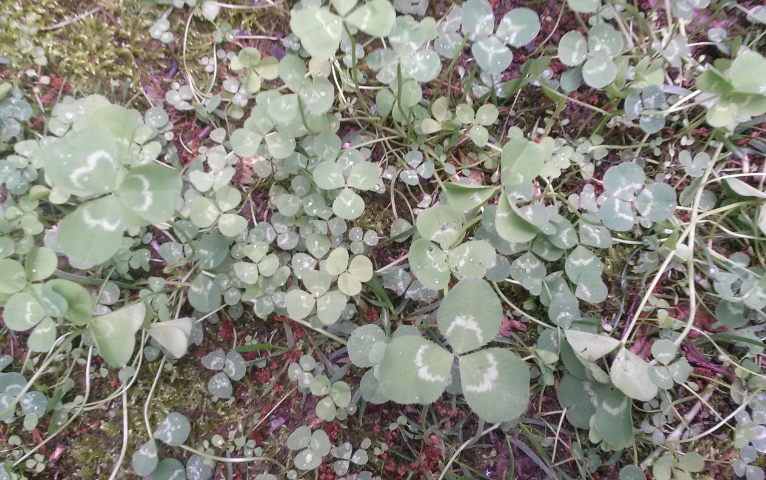
Trifolium repens (white clover)

Several species of clover are extensively cultivated as fodder plants. The most widely cultivated clovers are Trifolium repens (white clover) and Trifolium pratense (red clover). Clover, either sown alone or in mixture with ryegrass, has for a long time formed a staple crop for silaging, for several reasons: it grows freely, shooting up again after repeated mowings; it produces an abundant crop; it is palatable to and nutritious for livestock; it fixes nitrogen using symbiotic bacteria in its root nodules, reducing the need for synthetic fertilizers; it grows in a great range of soils and climates; and it is appropriate for either pasturage or green composting.

In many areas, particularly on acidic soil, clover is short-lived because of a combination of insect pests, diseases and nutrient balance; this is known as "clover sickness". When crop rotations are managed so that clover does not recur at intervals shorter than eight years, it grows with much of its pristine vigor.

Clovers are most efficiently pollinated by bumblebees, which have declined as a result of agricultural intensification. Honeybees can also pollinate clover, and beekeepers are often in heavy demand from farmers with clover pastures. Farmers reap the benefits of increased reseeding that occurs with increased bee activity, which means that future clover yields remain abundant. Beekeepers benefit from the clover bloom, as clover is one of the main nectar sources for honeybees.

Trifolium repens, white or Dutch clover, is a perennial abundant in meadows and good pastures. The flowers are white or pinkish, becoming brown and deflexed as the corolla fades. Trifolium hybridum, alsike or Swedish clover, is a perennial which was introduced early in the 19th century and has now become naturalized in Britain. The flowers are white or rosy, and resemble those of Trifolium repens. Trifolium medium, meadow or zigzag clover, a perennial with straggling flexuous stems and rose-purple flowers, has potential for interbreeding with T. pratense to produce perennial crop plants.

Other species are: Trifolium arvense, hare's-foot trefoil; found in fields and dry pastures, a soft hairy plant with minute white or pale pink flowers and feathery sepals; Trifolium fragiferum, strawberry clover, with globose, rose-purple heads and swollen calyxes; Trifolium campestre, hop trefoil, on dry pastures and roadsides, the heads of pale yellow flowers suggesting miniature hops; and the somewhat similar Trifolium dubium, common in pastures and roadsides, with smaller heads and small yellow flowers turning dark brown.

== Uses ==
It is edible by humans,. The plant is a traditional Native American food, which is eaten both raw and after drying and smoking the roots. The seeds from the blossoms are used to make bread. It is also possible to make tea from the blossoms.

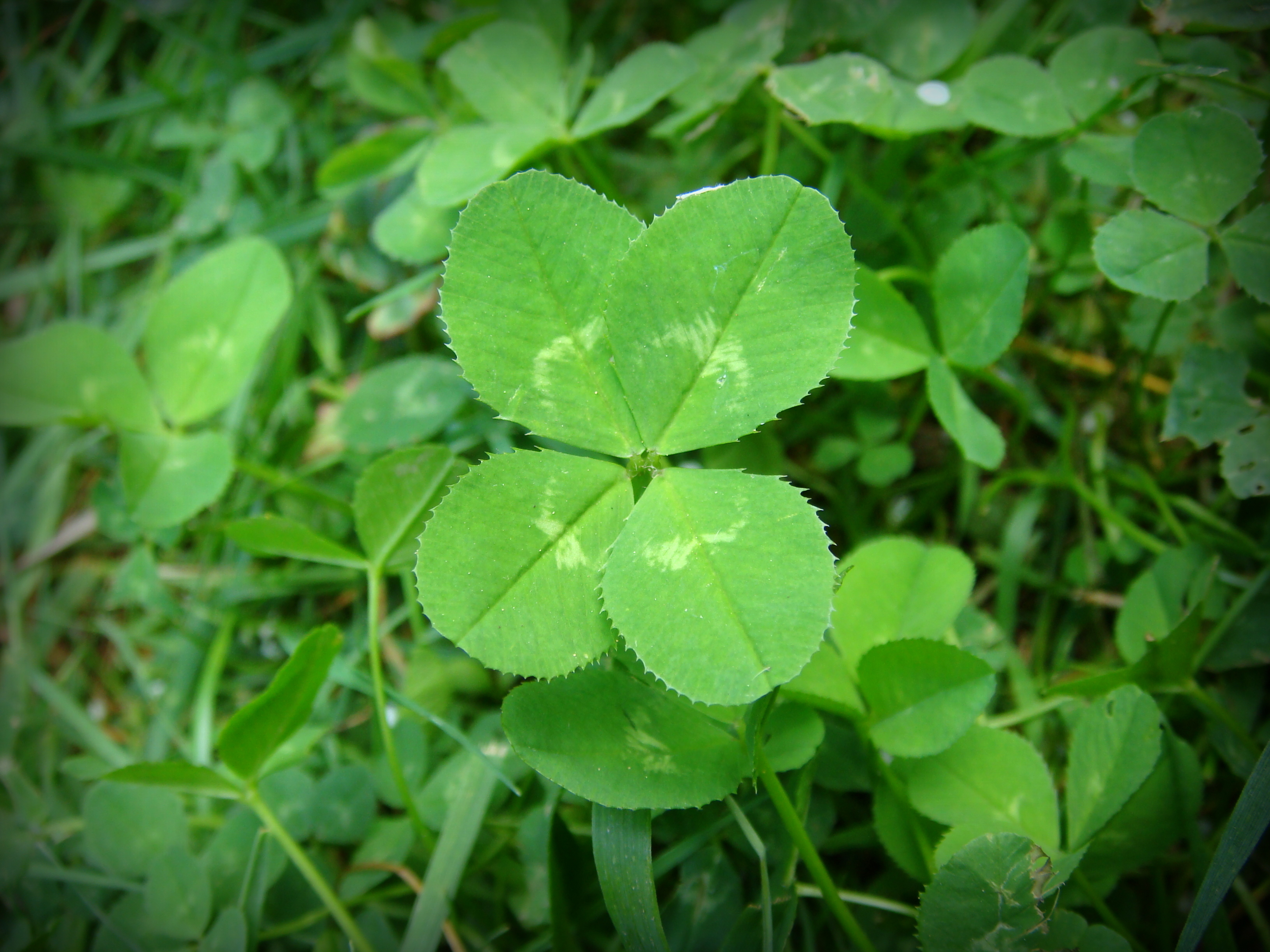
Four-leaf Trifolium repens (white clover)

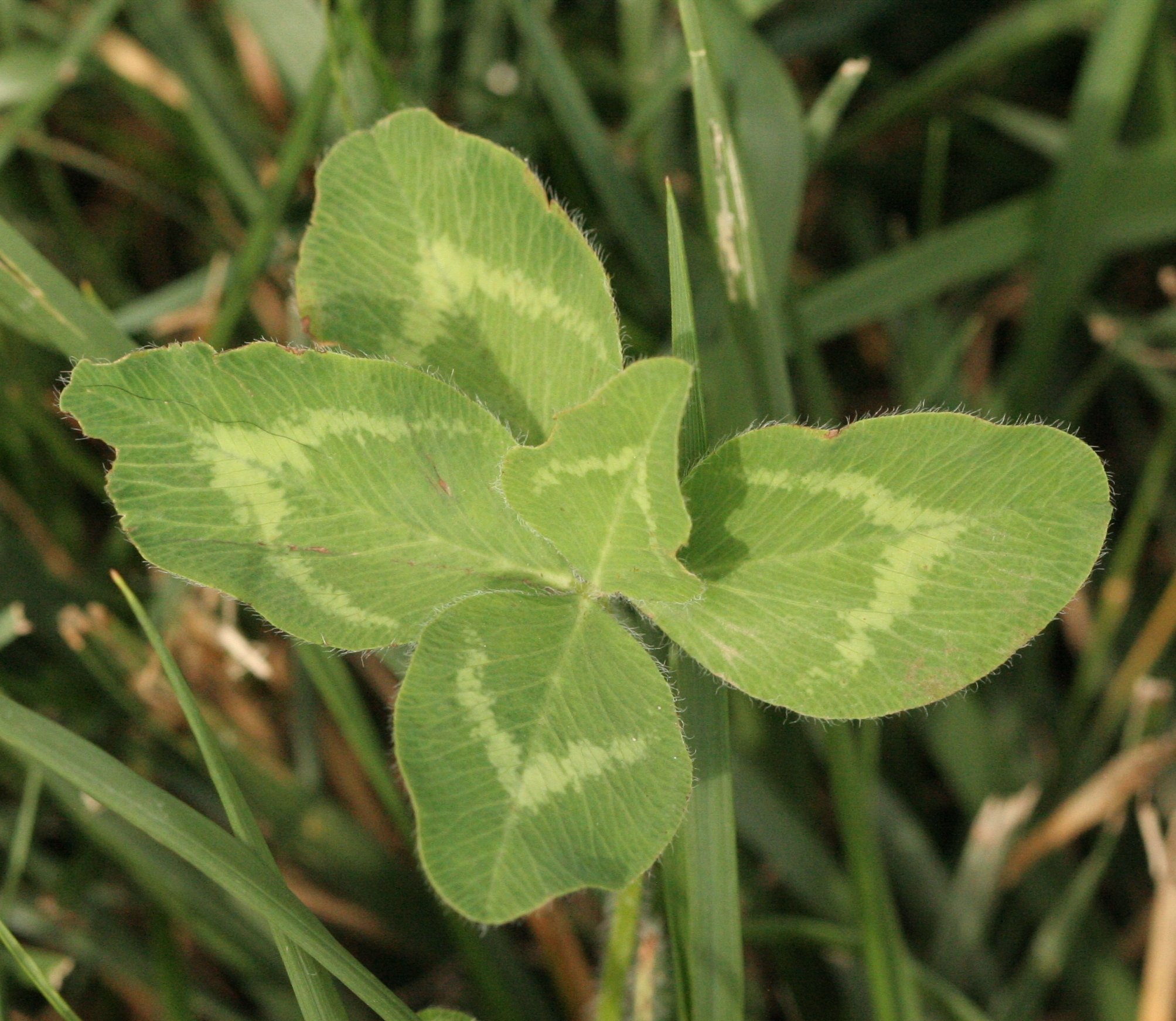
Five-leaf T. pratense (red clover)

== Symbolism ==
Shamrock, the traditional Irish symbol, which was coined by Saint Patrick for the Holy Trinity, is commonly associated with clover, although alternatively sometimes with the various species within the genus Oxalis, which are also trifoliate.

Clovers occasionally have four leaflets, instead of the usual three. These four-leaf clovers, like other rarities, are considered lucky. Clovers can also have five, six, or more leaflets, but these are rarer still. The clover's outer leaf structure varies in physical orientation.

The record for most leaflets is 63, set on August 2, 2023, by Yoshiharu Watanabe in Japan. The previous record holder, Shigeo Obara, had discovered an 18-leaf clover in 2002, a 21-leaf clover in 2008 and a 56-leaf clover in 2009, also in Japan.

- A common idiom is "to be (or to live) in clover", meaning to live a carefree life of ease, comfort, or prosperity.
- A common saying in surgery [regarding the appearance of wound after hemorrhoidectomy] is "If it looks like clover, the trouble is over; if it looks like dahlia, it’s surely a failure."
- A cloverleaf interchange is named for the resemblance to the leaflets of a (four-leaf) clover when viewed from the air.

== See also ==
- Clover lawn
- Cloverleaf quasar
- Green manure
- Monofloral honey
