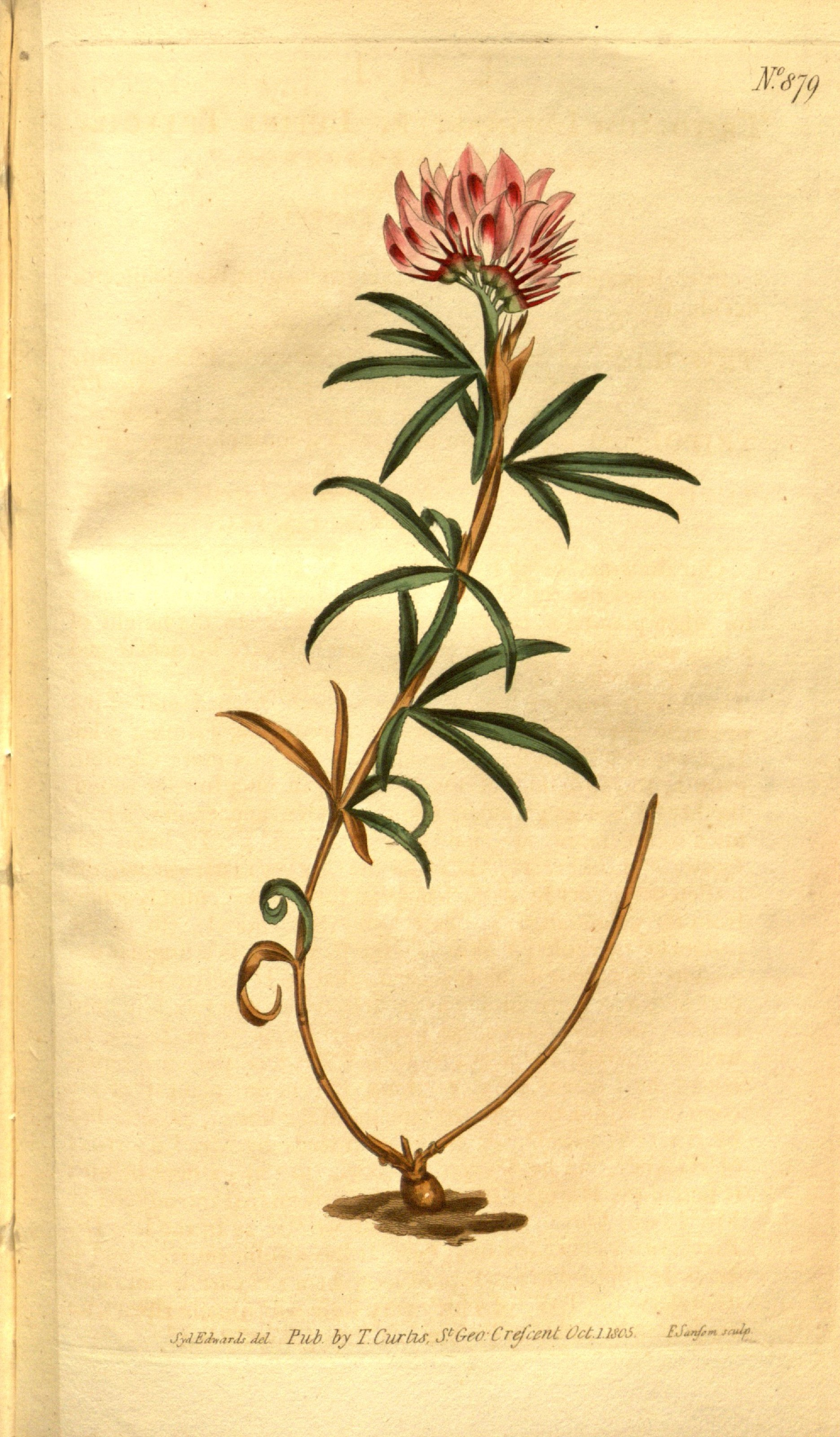

Scientific classification
- Kingdom: Plantae
- Clade: Tracheophytes
- Clade: Angiosperms
- Clade: Eudicots
- Clade: Rosids
- Order: Fabales
- Family: Fabaceae
- Subfamily: Faboideae
- Genus: Trifolium
- Species: T. lupinaster

Binomial name
- Trifolium lupinaster L.

= Trifolium lupinaster =

Species of legume

Trifolium lupinaster is a species of flowering plant belonging to the family Fabaceae.

Its native range is Eastern Central Europe to Japan.
