= Trifolium jokerstii =

Conservation status
- Imperiled (NatureServe)

Scientific classification
- Kingdom: Plantae
- Clade: Embryophytes
- Clade: Tracheophytes
- Clade: Angiosperms
- Clade: Eudicots
- Clade: Rosids
- Order: Fabales
- Family: Fabaceae
- Subfamily: Faboideae
- Genus: Trifolium
- Species: T. jokerstii

Binomial name
- Trifolium jokerstii Vincent & R.Morgan

Species of legume

Trifolium jokerstii is a rare species of clover known by the common names Jim's clover and Butte County golden clover.

== Description ==
This is an annual herb with a decumbent or erect, hairless stem. The leaves are made up of oval blades up to about 3 centimeters (1 1/4 in) long which are marked with a white or purplish chevron, and large, lance-shaped, toothed stipules. The inflorescence is a head of at least five golden yellow flowers on a bowl-like base of bracts.

== Taxonomy ==
The species was previously included within the description of Trifolium barbigerum as an odd yellow-flowered variant of a mostly purple-pink-flowered species. It was elevated to species status in 1998 and was named for the California botanist Jim Jokerst.

== Distribution and habitat ==
It is endemic to Butte County, California, where it is known from eight or nine occurrences near Oroville. It grows in seasonally moist habitat, such as vernal pools, pastures, and ephemeral creeks.
