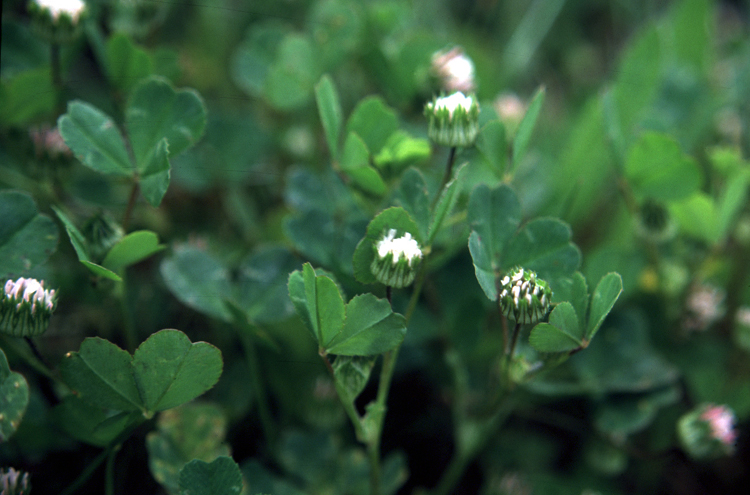

Scientific classification
- Kingdom: Plantae
- Clade: Tracheophytes
- Clade: Angiosperms
- Clade: Eudicots
- Clade: Rosids
- Order: Fabales
- Family: Fabaceae
- Subfamily: Faboideae
- Genus: Trifolium
- Species: T. microdon

Binomial name
- Trifolium microdon Hook. & Arn.

= Trifolium microdon =

Species of legume

Trifolium microdon is a species of clover known by the common name thimble clover.

It is an annual herb taking a decumbent or erect form. It is coated in hairs. The leaves are made up of oval leaflets with notched or flat tips, each measuring up to 1.5 centimeters (1/2 in) long. The inflorescence is a head of flowers borne in a deep bowl-like involucre of bracts that can nearly envelop the whole head. The flower corollas are white to pink and about 0.5 cm long.

It is native to western North America from British Columbia to southern California, where it grows in many types of habitat, including disturbed areas.
