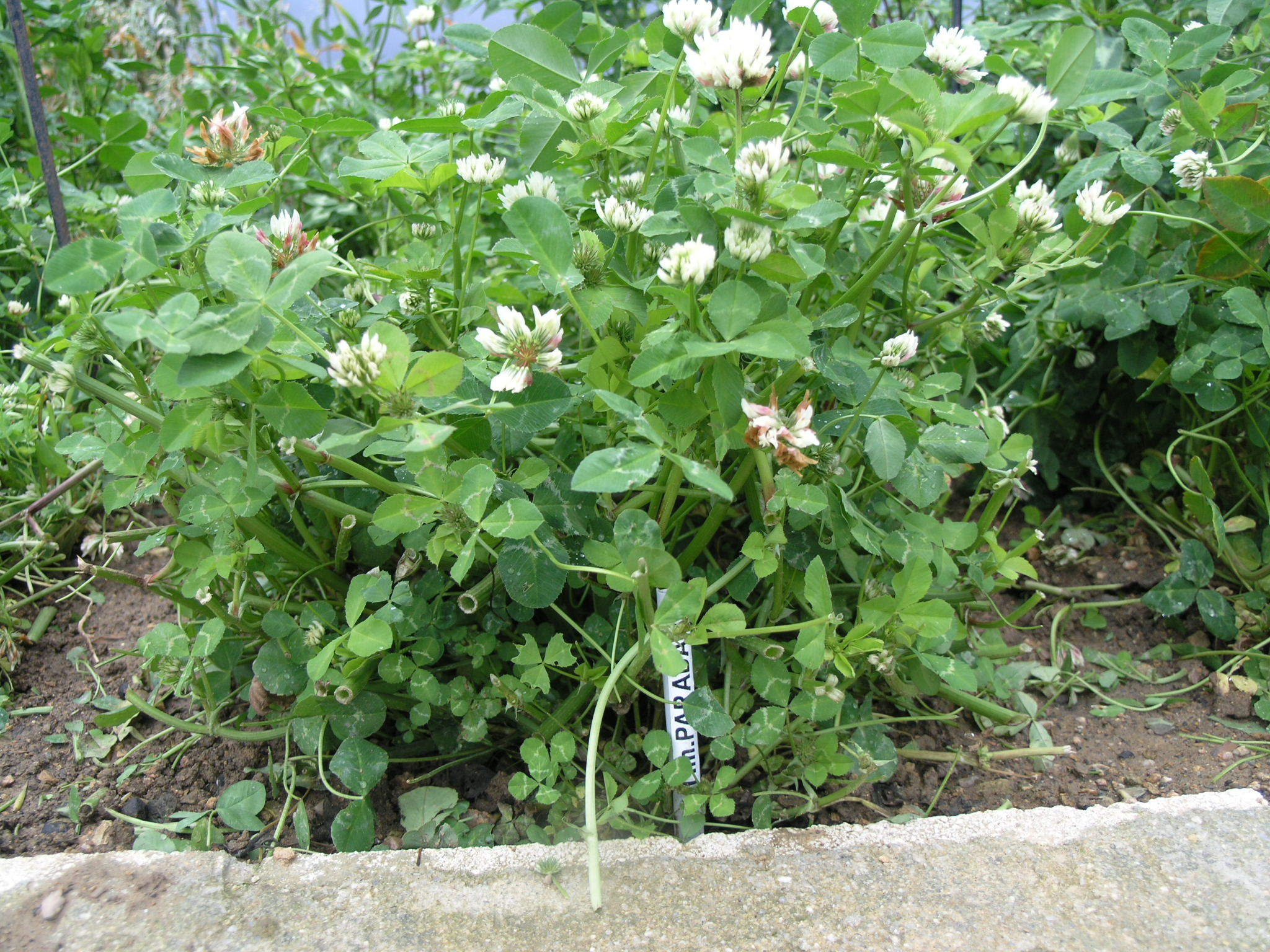

Scientific classification
- Kingdom: Plantae
- Clade: Tracheophytes
- Clade: Angiosperms
- Clade: Eudicots
- Clade: Rosids
- Order: Fabales
- Family: Fabaceae
- Subfamily: Faboideae
- Genus: Trifolium
- Species: T. michelianum

Binomial name
- Trifolium michelianum Savi

Synonyms
- Amoria micheliana (Savi) C.Presl

= Trifolium michelianum =

Species of plant

Trifolium michelianum, also called Balansa clover, is a species of annual plant in the Fabaceae family. It is native to the Mediteranean.

== Taxonomy ==
The species was first formally described by botanist Gaetano Savi in 1798.

== Subtaxa ==
The following subspecies are accepted:

- Trifolium michelianum var. michelianum
- Trifolium michelianum var. balansae (Boiss.) Azn.

== Distribution ==
Trifolium michelianum occurs primarily in territories bordering the Mediterranean Sea, from Morocco and Algeria in North Africa to France, Italy, most countries of the Balkans in Europe and Turkey in Asia, thus it is adapted primarily to Mediterranean and temperate climates with hot and dry summers and cool winters with an easy access to moisture in the soil. It has also been introduced to Germany, Belgium, Netherlands and Australia, with Australia utilizing it as a commercial crop as well.
