= Trifolium sannineum =

Conservation status
- Endangered (IUCN 3.1)

Scientific classification
- Kingdom: Plantae
- Clade: Tracheophytes
- Clade: Angiosperms
- Clade: Eudicots
- Clade: Rosids
- Order: Fabales
- Family: Fabaceae
- Subfamily: Faboideae
- Genus: Trifolium
- Species: T. sannineum

Binomial name
- Trifolium sannineum Mouterde

Species of plant

Trifolium sannineum, the trèfle de Sannine (French: 'clover of Sannine'), is a species of flowering plant in the family Fabaceae, native to Lebanon. Found at elevations between 1,200 to 2,000 m (3,900 to 6,600 ft) in only five locations, it is endangered by climate change.
