= Trifolium lemmonii =

Scientific classification
- Kingdom: Plantae
- Clade: Tracheophytes
- Clade: Angiosperms
- Clade: Eudicots
- Clade: Rosids
- Order: Fabales
- Family: Fabaceae
- Subfamily: Faboideae
- Genus: Trifolium
- Species: T. lemmonii

Binomial name
- Trifolium lemmonii S.Watson

Species of legume

Trifolium lemmonii is a species of clover known by the common name Lemmon's clover.

== Description ==
Trifolium lemmonii is a perennial herb spreading to form a mat or low clump. Each leaf is made up of 3 to 7 thick oval leaflets. The leaflets are 1 to 2 centimeters (1/2 to 3/4 in) long, toothed on the edges, and coated in rough hairs.

The inflorescence is a spherical umbel roughly 2 cm wide borne on an erect, arching peduncle. The flowers spread and droop from their attachment. Each has a hairy calyx of sepals with narrow, bristlelike lobes. The flower corolla is pale pink in color and just over 1 cm in length.

== Distribution and habitat ==
The plant is endemic to the northern Sierra Nevada in eastern California and just into Nevada.

It is a resident of the coniferous forests and sagebrush of the High Sierra.

== Conservation ==
Some populations are protected within the Plumas National Forest and Tahoe National Forest. It is California Department of Fish and Wildlife and IUCN listed Vulnerable species, and is on the California Native Plant Society Inventory of Rare and Endangered Plants.
