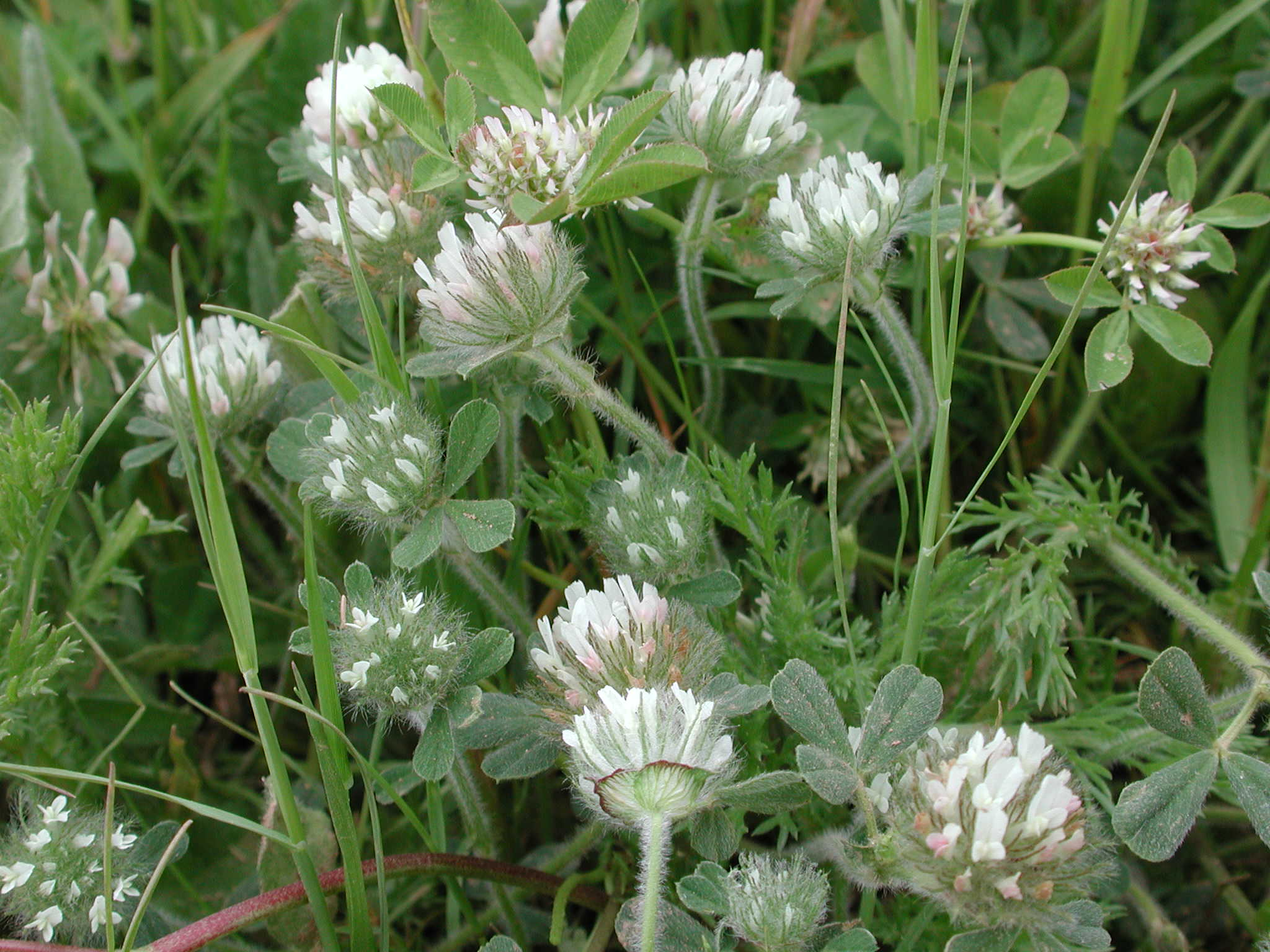
- Habit
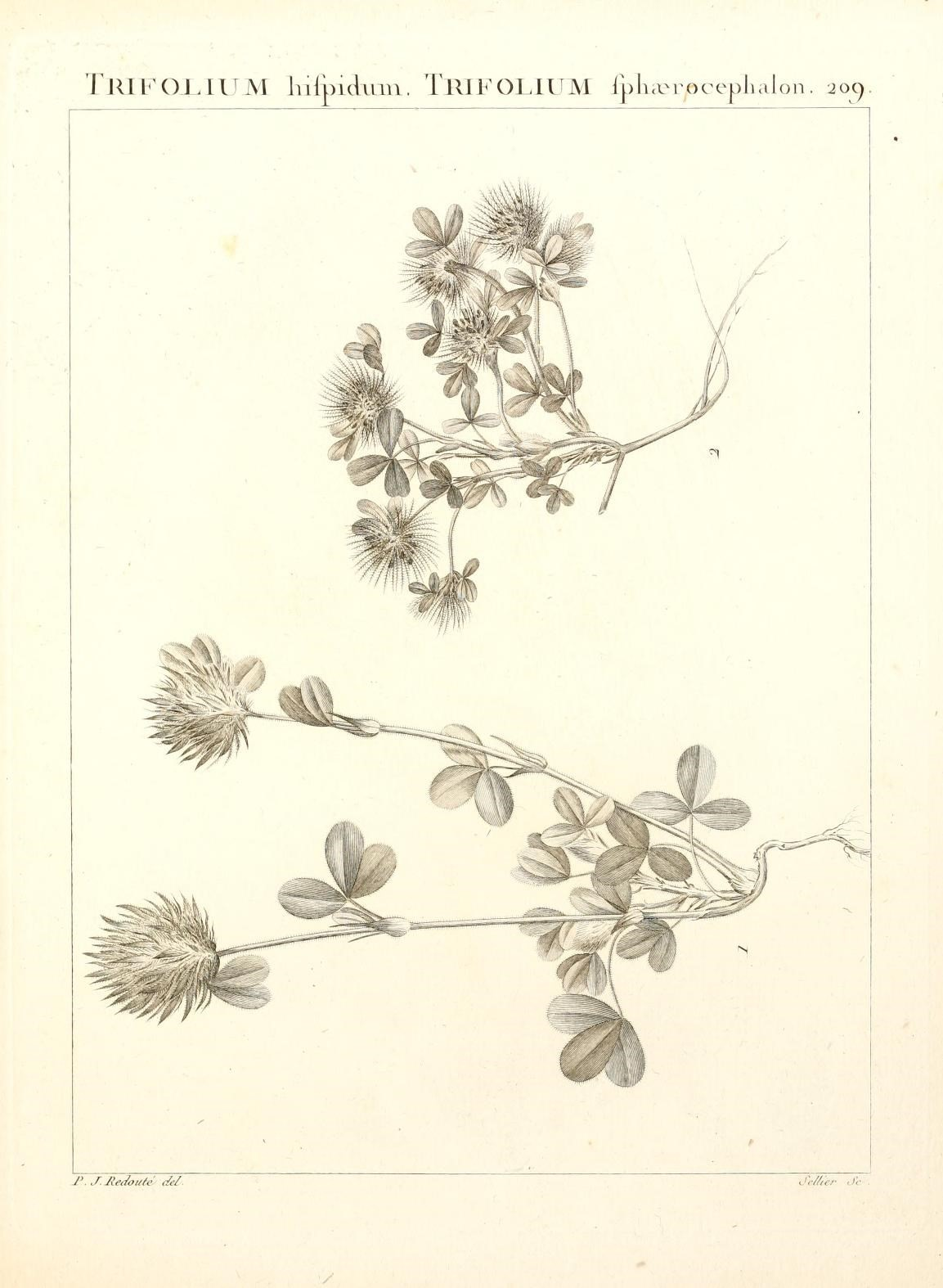
- Botanical illustration

Scientific classification
- Kingdom: Plantae
- Clade: Embryophytes
- Clade: Tracheophytes
- Clade: Spermatophytes
- Clade: Angiosperms
- Clade: Eudicots
- Clade: Rosids
- Order: Fabales
- Family: Fabaceae
- Subfamily: Faboideae
- Genus: Trifolium
- Species: T. cherleri

Binomial name
- Trifolium cherleri L.

Synonyms
- Trifolium arachnoideum C.Presl; Trifolium involucratum Lam.; Trifolium obvallatum Moench; Trifolium phlebocalyx Fenzl ex Tchich.; Trifolium sphaerocephalum Desf.

= Trifolium cherleri =

Species of flowering plant

Trifolium cherleri, the cupped clover, is a species of flowering plant in the family Fabaceae. It is native to the Canary Islands, the Mediterranean, and the Middle East as far east as Iran, and it has been introduced to Australia as a forage. Three cultivars have been developed in Australia; 'Beenong', 'Yamina' and 'Lisare'.
