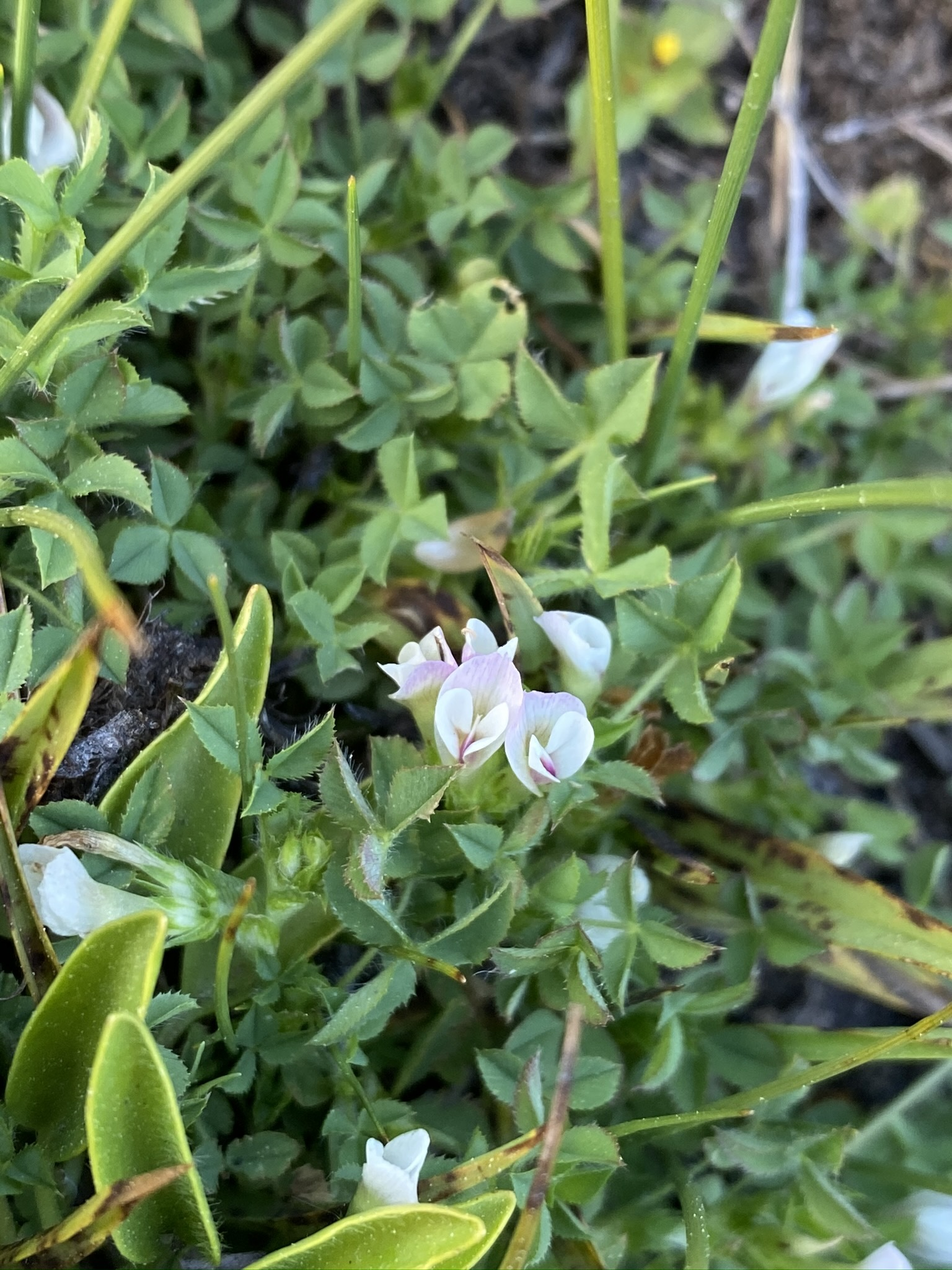

Scientific classification
- Kingdom: Plantae
- Clade: Tracheophytes
- Clade: Angiosperms
- Clade: Eudicots
- Clade: Rosids
- Order: Fabales
- Family: Fabaceae
- Subfamily: Faboideae
- Genus: Trifolium
- Species: T. monanthum

Binomial name
- Trifolium monanthum A.Gray

= Trifolium monanthum =

Species of legume

Trifolium monanthum is a species of clover known by the common name mountain carpet clover.

== Description ==
Trifolium monanthum is a small perennial herb forming small clumps of hairless or slightly hairy herbage. The leaves are made up of oval leaflets up to 1.2 centimeters (1/2 in) in length.

The inflorescence is reduced with only a few flowers, or a single flower. The flower corolla measures up to 1.2 cm long and is white, sometimes with lavender speckles. The bloom period is April to June.

== Distribution and habitat ==
It is native to eastern California and western Nevada in the Sierra Nevada, and in Southern California in the eastern Transverse Ranges, and the San Jacinto Mountains. It occurs at elevations above 1,500 meters (4,900 ft) in coniferous forests, woodlands, and meadows.
