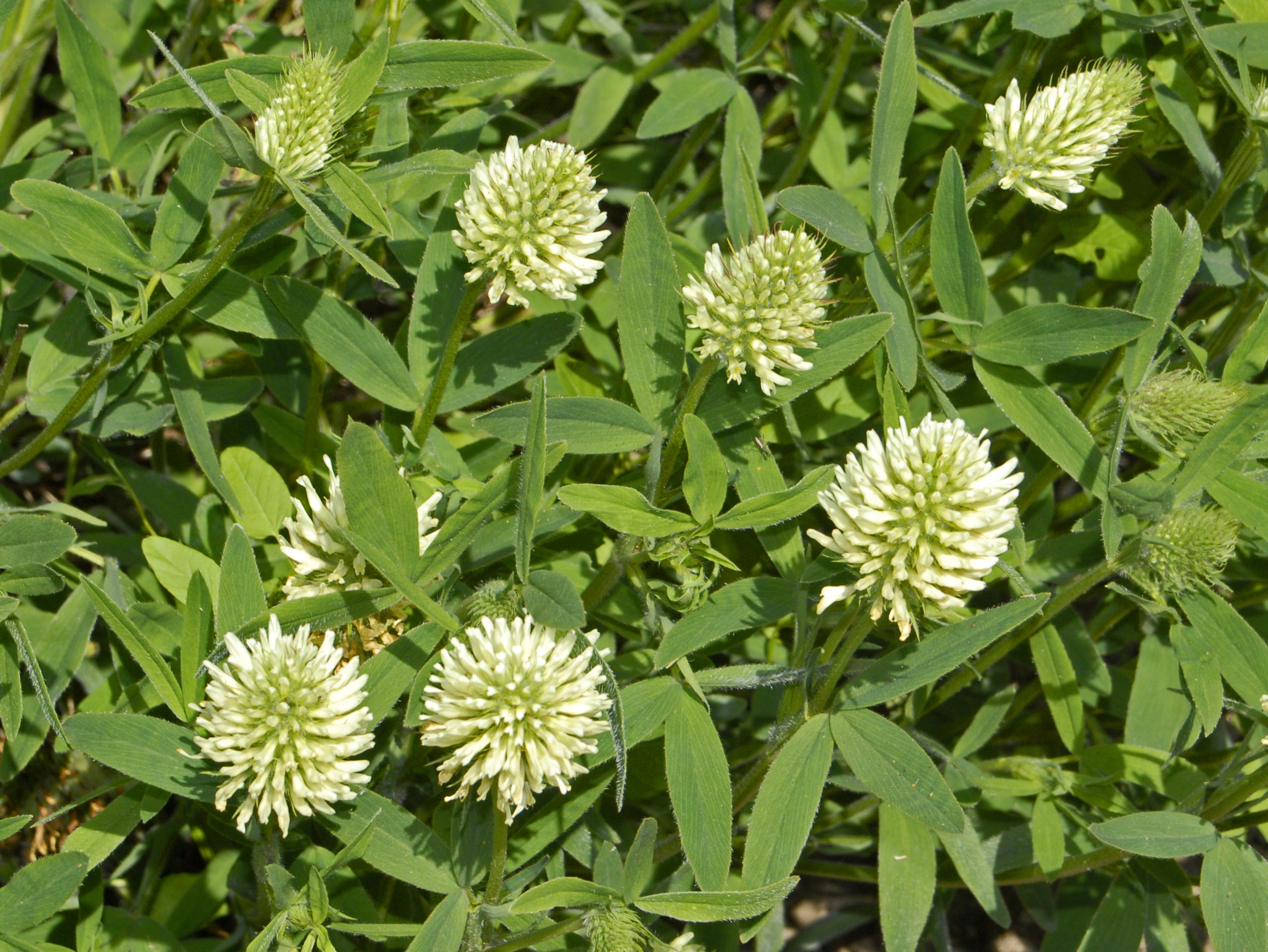
- Trifolium pannonicum at the Jardin des Plantes, Paris

Scientific classification
- Kingdom: Plantae
- Clade: Tracheophytes
- Clade: Angiosperms
- Clade: Eudicots
- Clade: Rosids
- Order: Fabales
- Family: Fabaceae
- Subfamily: Faboideae
- Genus: Trifolium
- Species: T. pannonicum

Binomial name
- Trifolium pannonicum Jacq.

= Trifolium pannonicum =

Species of legume

Trifolium pannonicum is a species of clover known by the common name Hungarian Clover.

== Description ==
Trifolium pannonicum is a perennial non-climbing clump-forming herb with lanceolate, dark green leaves. The upright hairy stem can reach a height of about 40–80 centimetres (16–31 in). It bears ovoid spike inflorescences of cream or pale yellow flowers, about 2.5 cm (1 in) long, blooming in late spring and mid-summer.

== Distribution ==
This species is native to Albania, Bulgaria, Croatia, France, Germany, Greece, Hungary, Italy, Moldova, Poland, Romania, Serbia, Slovakia, Turkey and Ukraine.
