= Trifolium latinum =

Scientific classification
- Kingdom: Plantae
- Clade: Tracheophytes
- Clade: Angiosperms
- Clade: Eudicots
- Clade: Rosids
- Order: Fabales
- Family: Fabaceae
- Subfamily: Faboideae
- Genus: Trifolium
- Species: T. latinum

Binomial name
- Trifolium latinum Sebast.
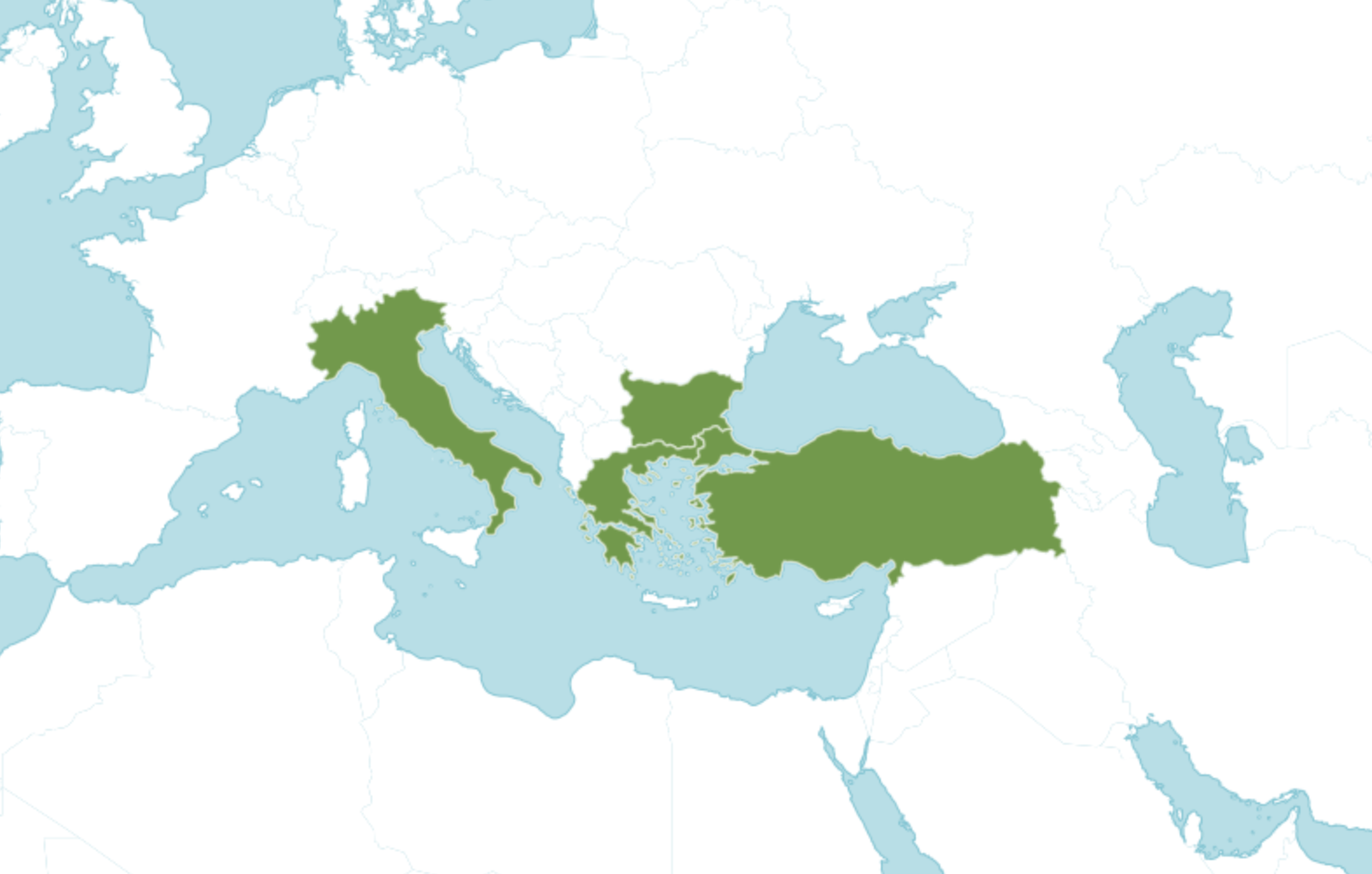
- Range of Trifolium latinum

Species of clover

Trifolium latinum is an annual species of clover, native to south-east Europe and west Turkey.

== Description ==
Trifolium latinum has lanceolate leaves and flowers in May-June. Its seeds are long lasting in the environment, meaning after destruction of the population in an area, it is able to recolonize.

== Distribution ==
Trifolium latinum is found in the temperate regions of south east Europe and West Turkey near the Mediterranean sea. In Italy, it was thought to be extinct until it was rediscovered in 2012. Since its rediscovery, its range in Italy is confined to 50m of coppice of Quercus frainetto and Q. cerris.
