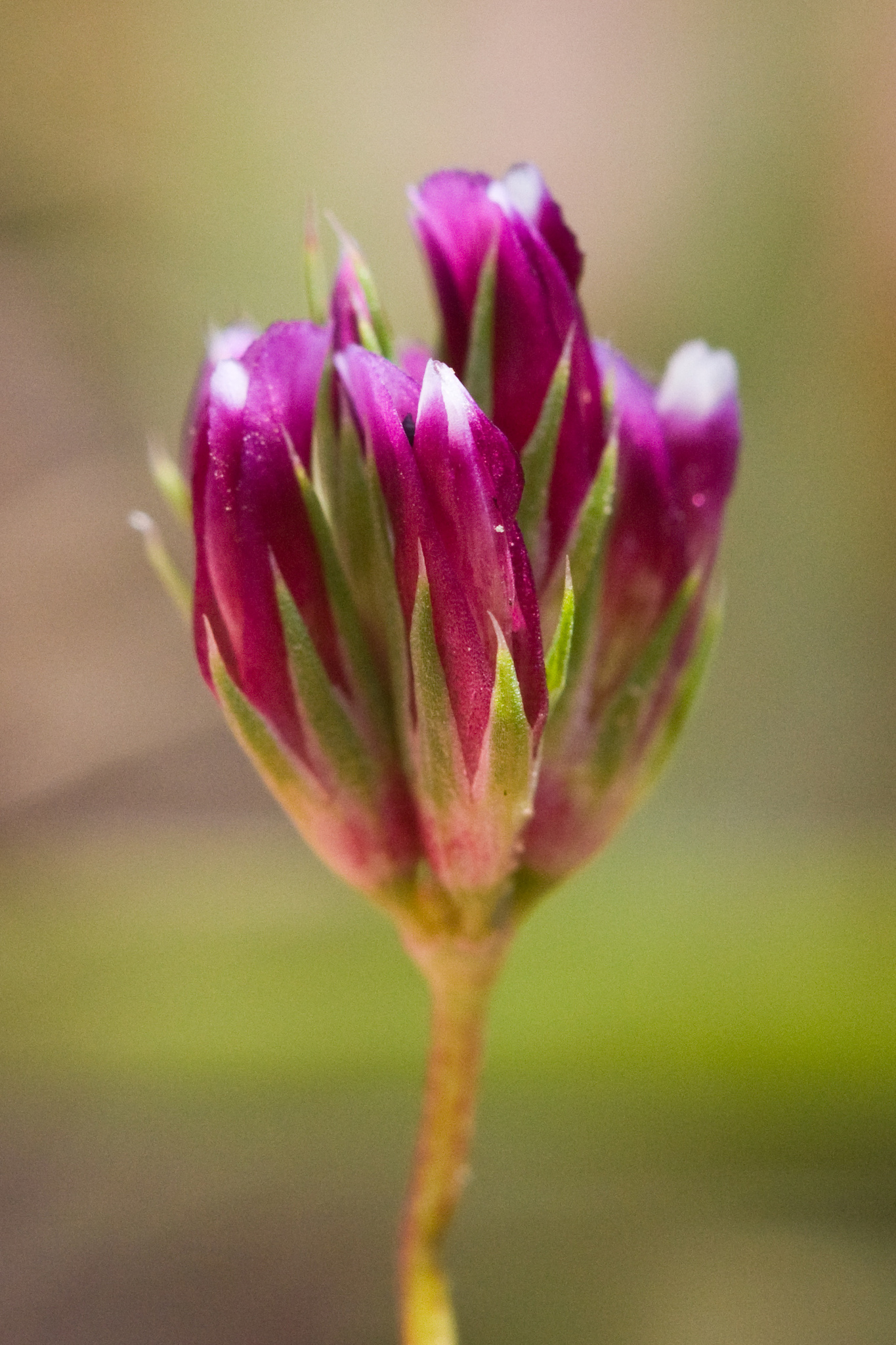

Scientific classification
- Kingdom: Plantae
- Clade: Tracheophytes
- Clade: Angiosperms
- Clade: Eudicots
- Clade: Rosids
- Order: Fabales
- Family: Fabaceae
- Subfamily: Faboideae
- Genus: Trifolium
- Species: T. gracilentum

Binomial name
- Trifolium gracilentum Torr. & A.Gray

= Trifolium gracilentum =

Species of legume

Trifolium gracilentum is a species of clover known by the common names pinpoint clover and slender clover.

== Description ==
It is an annual herb growing prostrate to erect in form with mostly hairless or slightly hairy herbage. The leaves are made up of lance-shaped to oval leaflets. The inflorescence is an umbel of flowers that spread out or flex downward. The flowers have pink or purple corollas less than 1 centimeter (3/8 in) long.

== Varieties ==
Trifolium gracilentum used to be classified with two varieties:

- Trifolium gracilentum var. gracilentum
- Trifolium gracilentum var. palmeriOne variety of this species, var. palmeri, is a rare plant limited to the Channel Islands of California; it is sometimes treated as a species in its own right, Trifolium palmeri.

== Distribution and habitat ==
It is native to western North America including the west coast of the United States and northwestern Mexico, where it grows in many types of habitat, including disturbed areas.
