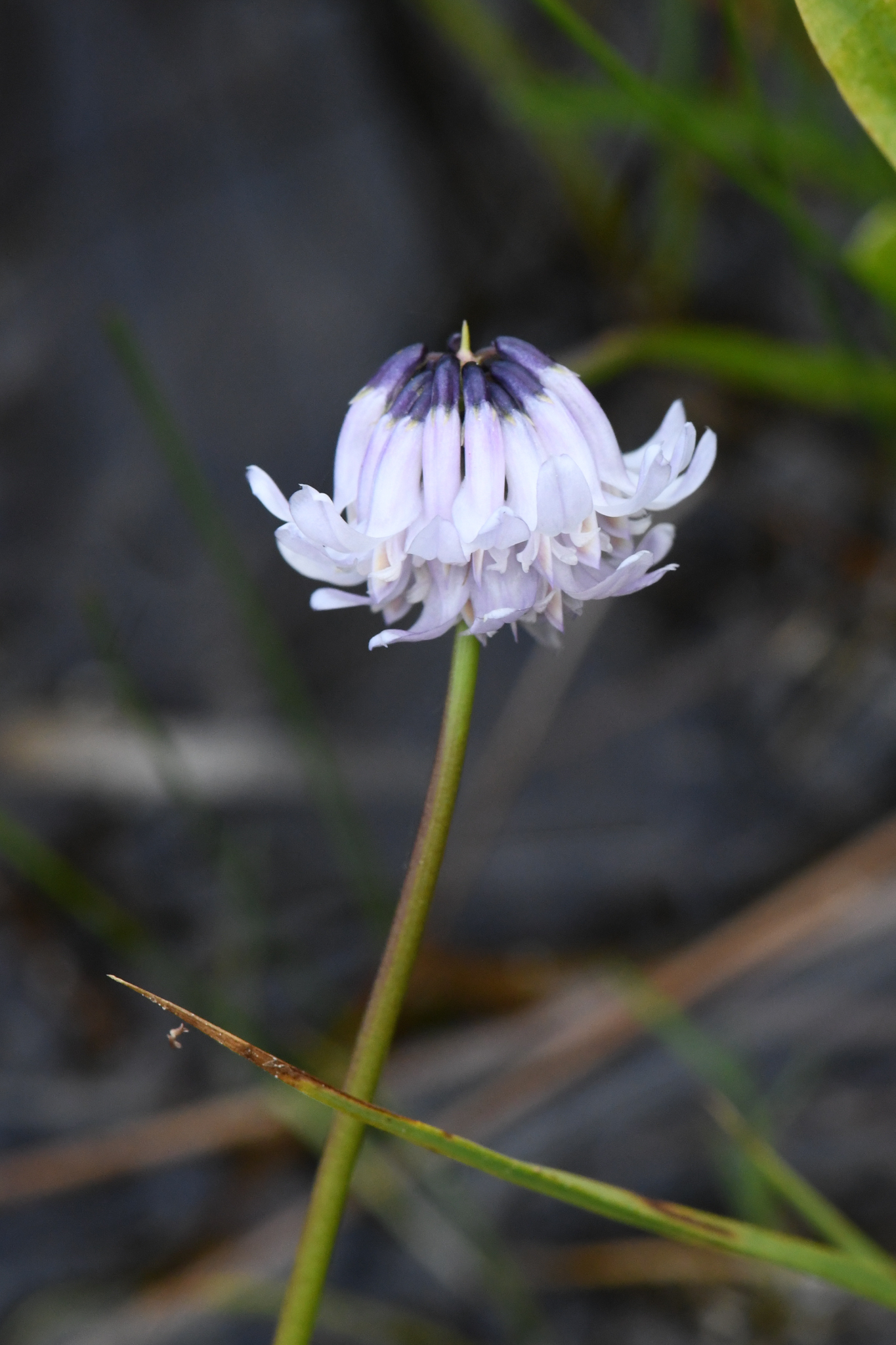

Scientific classification
- Kingdom: Plantae
- Clade: Embryophytes
- Clade: Tracheophytes
- Clade: Spermatophytes
- Clade: Angiosperms
- Clade: Eudicots
- Clade: Rosids
- Order: Fabales
- Family: Fabaceae
- Subfamily: Faboideae
- Genus: Trifolium
- Species: T. bolanderi

Binomial name
- Trifolium bolanderi A.Gray

= Trifolium bolanderi =

Species of flowering plant

Trifolium bolanderi is a species of clover known by the common names Bolander's clover and parasol clover.

== Description ==
Trifolium bolanderi is a perennial herb growing in clumps with upright stems and mostly hairless herbage. The leaves are arranged around the base of the stem. Each is made up of oval leaflets with toothed edges.

The inflorescence is a head of flowers 1 or 2 centimeters (1/2 or 3/4 in) wide, the flowers soon drooping to hang from the head in a parasol-shaped arrangement. Each flower has a calyx of dark purple or black sepals that contrasts with the pale pinkish corolla. The tubular corolla measures just over 1 cm long.

== Distribution and habitat ==
The perennial herb is endemic to California. It is known only from the meadows of the central Sierra Nevada in Lower and Upper montane coniferous forest habitats, with small populations in Fresno County, Madera County, and Mariposa County.

== Conservation ==
It is listed as a vulnerable species by the California Department of Fish and Wildlife and the International Union for Conservation of Nature. It is on the California Native Plant Society Inventory of Rare and Endangered Plants as a fairly endangered species.
