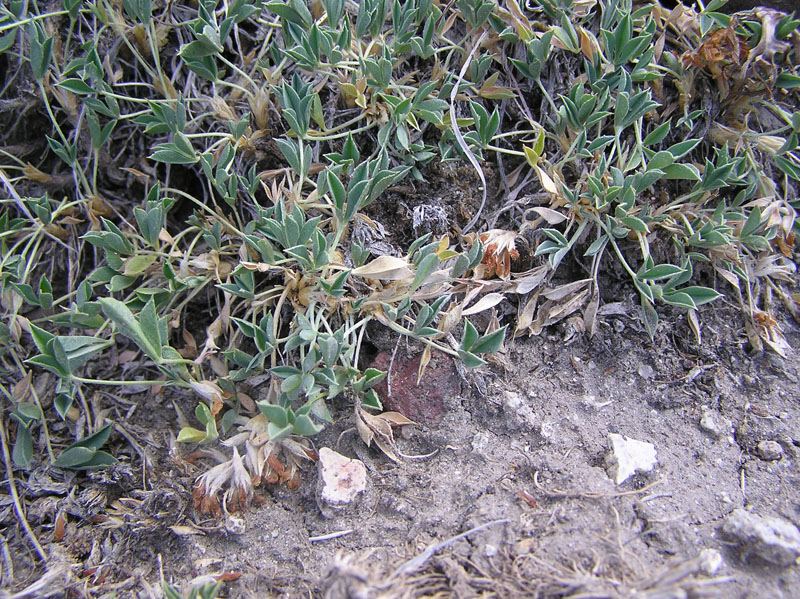
- var. podocephalum

Conservation status
- Vulnerable (NatureServe)

Scientific classification
- Kingdom: Plantae
- Clade: Tracheophytes
- Clade: Angiosperms
- Clade: Eudicots
- Clade: Rosids
- Order: Fabales
- Family: Fabaceae
- Subfamily: Faboideae
- Genus: Trifolium
- Species: T. andinum

Binomial name
- Trifolium andinum Nutt.

Synonyms
- List: Trifolium andinum var. canone S.L.Welsh & N.D.Atwood (2008); Trifolium andinum var. navajoense S.L.Welsh & N.D.Atwood (2008); Trifolium andinum var. podocephalum Barneby (1989); Trifolium andinum var. wahwahense S.L.Welsh & N.D.Atwood (2008)

= Trifolium andinum =

Plant species in the pea family

Trifolium andinum is a species of flowering plant in the family Fabaceae known by the common name Intermountain clover. It is native to the Intermountain West of the United States from Nevada and Arizona to Wyoming and New Mexico. The rare var. podocephalum is endemic to Nevada.
