= List of Canadian plants by family F =

Main page: List of Canadian plants by family

The following families of vascular plants are listed as occurring in Canada:

For mosses of Canada, see:

== Fabaceae ==
- Acmispon decumbens, syn. Lotus nevadensis – Nevada bird's-foot trefoil
- Amorpha canescens – downy indigobush
- Amorpha fruticosa – false indigobush
- Amorpha nana – fragrant indigobush
- Amphicarpaea bracteata – American hog-peanut
- Apios americana – American groundnut
- Astragalus adsurgens – rattle milkvetch
- Astragalus agrestis – Don meadow milkvetch
- Astragalus alpinus – alpine milkvetch
- Astragalus americanus – American milkvetch
- Astragalus australis – Indian milkvetch
- Astragalus beckwithii – Beckwith's milkvetch
- Astragalus bisulcatus – two-grooved milkvetch
- Astragalus bodinii – Bodin's milkvetch
- Astragalus bourgovii – Bourgeau's milkvetch
- Astragalus canadensis – Canadian milkvetch
- Astragalus collinus – rattle milkvetch
- Astragalus convallarius – lesser rushy milkvetch
- Astragalus crassicarpus – ground-plum
- Astragalus drummondii – Drummond's milkvetch
- Astragalus eucosmus – pretty milkvetch
- Astragalus filipes – basalt milkvetch
- Astragalus flexuosus – flexible milkvetch
- Astragalus gilviflorus – three-leaf milkvetch
- Astragalus kentrophyta – spiny milkvetch
- Astragalus lentiginosus – mottled milkvetch
- Astragalus lotiflorus – low milkvetch
- Astragalus microcystis – least bladdery milkvetch
- Astragalus miser – timber milkvetch
- Astragalus missouriensis – Missouri milkvetch
- Astragalus neglectus – Cooper's milkvetch
- Astragalus nutzotinensis – Nutzotin milkvetch
- Astragalus pectinatus – narrowleaf milkvetch
- Astragalus purshii – Pursh's milkvetch
- Astragalus racemosus – racemose milkvetch
- Astragalus robbinsii – Robbins' milkvetch
- Astragalus sclerocarpus – woody-pod milkvetch
- Astragalus spaldingii – Spalding's milkvetch
- Astragalus spatulatus – tufted milkvetch
- Astragalus tenellus – looseflower milkvetch
- Astragalus umbellatus – tundra milkvetch
- Astragalus vexilliflexus – bent-flowered milkvetch
- Astragalus williamsii – Williams' milkvetch
- Baptisia alba – prairie false indigo
- Baptisia tinctoria – yellow wild indigo
- Cercis canadensis – eastern redbud
- Dalea candida – white prairie-clover
- Dalea purpurea – purple prairie-clover
- Dalea villosa – silky prairie-clover
- Desmodium canadense – showy tick-trefoil
- Desmodium canescens – hoary tick-trefoil
- Desmodium cuspidatum – toothed tick-trefoil
- Desmodium glutinosum – large tick-trefoil
- Desmodium nudiflorum – bare-stemmed tick-trefoil
- Desmodium paniculatum – panicled-leaf tick-trefoil
- Desmodium perplexum – perplexed tick-trefoil
- Desmodium rotundifolium – prostrate tick-trefoil
- Gleditsia triacanthos – honey-locust
- Glycyrrhiza lepidota – wild licorice
- Gymnocladus dioicus – Kentucky coffee-tree
- Hedysarum alpinum – alpine sweetvetch
- Hedysarum boreale – boreal sweetvetch
- Hedysarum occidentale – western sweetvetch
- Hedysarum sulphurescens – yellow sweetvetch
- Lathyrus bijugatus – Latah tule-pea
- Lathyrus japonicus – beach pea
- Lathyrus littoralis – grey beach peavine
- Lathyrus nevadensis – Sierra Nevada peavine
- Lathyrus ochroleucus – pale vetchling peavine
- Lathyrus palustris – vetchling peavine
- Lathyrus venosus – smooth veiny peavine
- Lespedeza capitata – roundhead bushclover
- Lespedeza hirta – hairy bushclover
- Lespedeza intermedia – wand bushclover
- Lespedeza procumbens – trailing bushclover
- Lespedeza violacea – violet bushclover
- Lespedeza virginica – slender bushclover
- Lespedeza x longifolia
- Lespedeza x nuttallii – Nuttall's bushclover
- Lotus denticulatus – meadow trefoil
- Lotus formosissimus – seaside trefoil
- Lotus micranthus – smallflower trefoil
- Lotus parviflorus – smallflower trefoil
- Lotus pinnatus – bog bird's-foot trefoil
- Lotus unifoliolatus – American bird's-foot trefoil
- Lupinus albicaulis – sickle-keel lupine
- Lupinus arbustus – longspur lupine
- Lupinus arcticus – Arctic lupine
- Lupinus argenteus – silvery lupine
- Lupinus bicolor – Lindley's lupine
- Lupinus bingenensis – Bingen lupine
- Lupinus burkei – Burke's lupine
- Lupinus caespitosus – stemless dwarf lupine
- Lupinus caudatus – Kellogg's spurred lupine
- Lupinus densiflorus – dense-flowered lupine
- Lupinus formosus – summer lupine
- Lupinus kuschei – Yukon lupine
- Lupinus latifolius – broadleaf lupine
- Lupinus lepidus – prairie lupine
- Lupinus leucophyllus – woolly-leaf lupine
- Lupinus littoralis – seashore lupine
- Lupinus lyallii – Lyall's lupine
- Lupinus minimus – Kettle Falls lupine
- Lupinus nootkatensis – Nootka lupine
- Lupinus oreganus – Oregon lupine
- Lupinus parviflorus – lodgepole lupine
- Lupinus perennis – sundial lupine
- Lupinus polycarpus – smallflower lupine
- Lupinus polyphyllus – largeleaf lupine
- Lupinus prunophilus – hairy bigleaf lupine
- Lupinus pusillus – small lupine
- Lupinus rivularis – riverbank lupine
- Lupinus sericeus – Pursh's silky lupine
- Lupinus sulphureus – sulphur-flower lupine
- Lupinus vallicola – open lupine
- Lupinus wyethii – Wyeth's lupine
- Lupinus x alpestris
- Oxytropis arctica – arctic crazyweed
- Oxytropis besseyi – Bessey's locoweed
- Oxytropis borealis – boreal locoweed
- Oxytropis campestris – northern yellow pointvetch
- Oxytropis deflexa – pendant-pod pointvetch
- Oxytropis huddelsonii – Huddelson's crazyweed
- Oxytropis lagopus – hare's-foot pointvetch
- Oxytropis lambertii – stemless pointvetch
- Oxytropis maydelliana – Maydell's pointvetch
- Oxytropis mertensiana – Mertens' crazyweed
- Oxytropis monticola – yellowflower locoweed
- Oxytropis nigrescens – blackish crazyweed
- Oxytropis podocarpa – Gray's pointvetch
- Oxytropis scammaniana – Scamman's crazyweed
- Oxytropis sericea – white pointvetch
- Oxytropis splendens – showy pointvetch
- Pediomelum argophyllum – silvery scurfpea
- Pediomelum esculentum – pomme-de-prairie
- Psoralidium lanceolatum – lanceleaf scurfpea
- Psoralidium tenuiflorum – few-flowered scurfpea
- Rupertia physodes – California scurfpea
- Senna hebecarpa – wild senna
- Strophostyles helvula – trailing wild bean
- Tephrosia virginiana – goat's-rue
- Thermopsis rhombifolia – roundleaf thermopsis
- Trifolium cyathiferum – bowl clover
- Trifolium depauperatum – balloon sack clover
- Trifolium dichotomum – branched Indian clover
- Trifolium fucatum – sour clover
- Trifolium macraei – McCrae's clover
- Trifolium microcephalum – smallhead clover
- Trifolium microdon – Valparaiso clover
- Trifolium oliganthum – few-flower clover
- Trifolium variegatum – whitetip clover
- Trifolium willdenowii – springbank clover
- Trifolium wormskioldii – Wormskjold's clover
- Vicia americana – American purple vetch
- Vicia caroliniana – Carolina wood vetch
- Vicia nigricans – black vetch

== Fabroniaceae ==
- Anacamptodon splachnoides – knothole moss
- Fabronia ciliaris
- Fabronia pusilla

== Fagaceae ==
- Castanea dentata – American chestnut
- Fagus grandifolia – American beech
- Quercus alba – white oak
- Quercus bicolor – swamp white oak
- Quercus ellipsoidalis – northern pin oak
- Quercus garryana – Oregon white oak
- Quercus ilicifolia – scrub oak
- Quercus macrocarpa – bur oak
- Quercus muehlenbergii – Chinquapin oak
- Quercus palustris – pin oak
- Quercus prinoides – dwarf Chinquapin oak
- Quercus rubra – northern red oak
- Quercus shumardii – Shumard's oak
- Quercus velutina – black oak
- Quercus x bebbiana
- Quercus x deamii
- Quercus x hawkinsiae
- Quercus x jackiana
- Quercus x palaeolithicola
- Quercus x schuettei

== Fissidentaceae ==
- Fissidens adianthoides
- Fissidens aphelotaxifolius
- Fissidens bryoides
- Fissidens bushii
- Fissidens dubius
- Fissidens exilis – small pocket moss
- Fissidens fontanus
- Fissidens grandifrons
- Fissidens limbatus
- Fissidens obtusifolius
- Fissidens osmundioides – Osmund fissidens moss
- Fissidens pauperculus
- Fissidens subbasilaris
- Fissidens taxifolius
- Fissidens ventricosus

== Fontinalaceae ==
- Dichelyma capillaceum
- Dichelyma falcatum
- Dichelyma pallescens
- Dichelyma uncinatum – dichelyma moss
- Fontinalis antipyretica – aquatic moss
- Fontinalis dalecarlica
- Fontinalis flaccida
- Fontinalis hypnoides
- Fontinalis macmillanii
- Fontinalis missourica
- Fontinalis neomexicana
- Fontinalis novae-angliae
- Fontinalis sphagnifolia
- Fontinalis sullivantii

== Fossombroniaceae ==
- Fossombronia foveolata
- Fossombronia longiseta
- Fossombronia wondraczekii

== Fumariaceae ==
- Adlumia fungosa – climbing fumitory
- Corydalis aurea – golden corydalis
- Corydalis flavula – yellow corydalis
- Corydalis pauciflora – few-flower corydalis
- Corydalis scouleri – Scouler's corydalis
- Corydalis sempervirens – pale corydalis
- Dicentra canadensis – squirrel-corn
- Dicentra cucullaria – Dutchman's breeches
- Dicentra formosa – Pacific bleedinghearts
- Dicentra uniflora – one-flower bleedinghearts

== Funariaceae ==
- Aphanorrhegma serratum
- Entosthodon fascicularis
- Entosthodon rubiginosus
- Funaria americana
- Funaria flavicans
- Funaria hygrometrica
- Funaria microstoma
- Funaria muhlenbergii
- Physcomitrella patens
- Physcomitrium collenchymatum
- Physcomitrium hookeri
- Physcomitrium immersum
- Physcomitrium pyriforme
