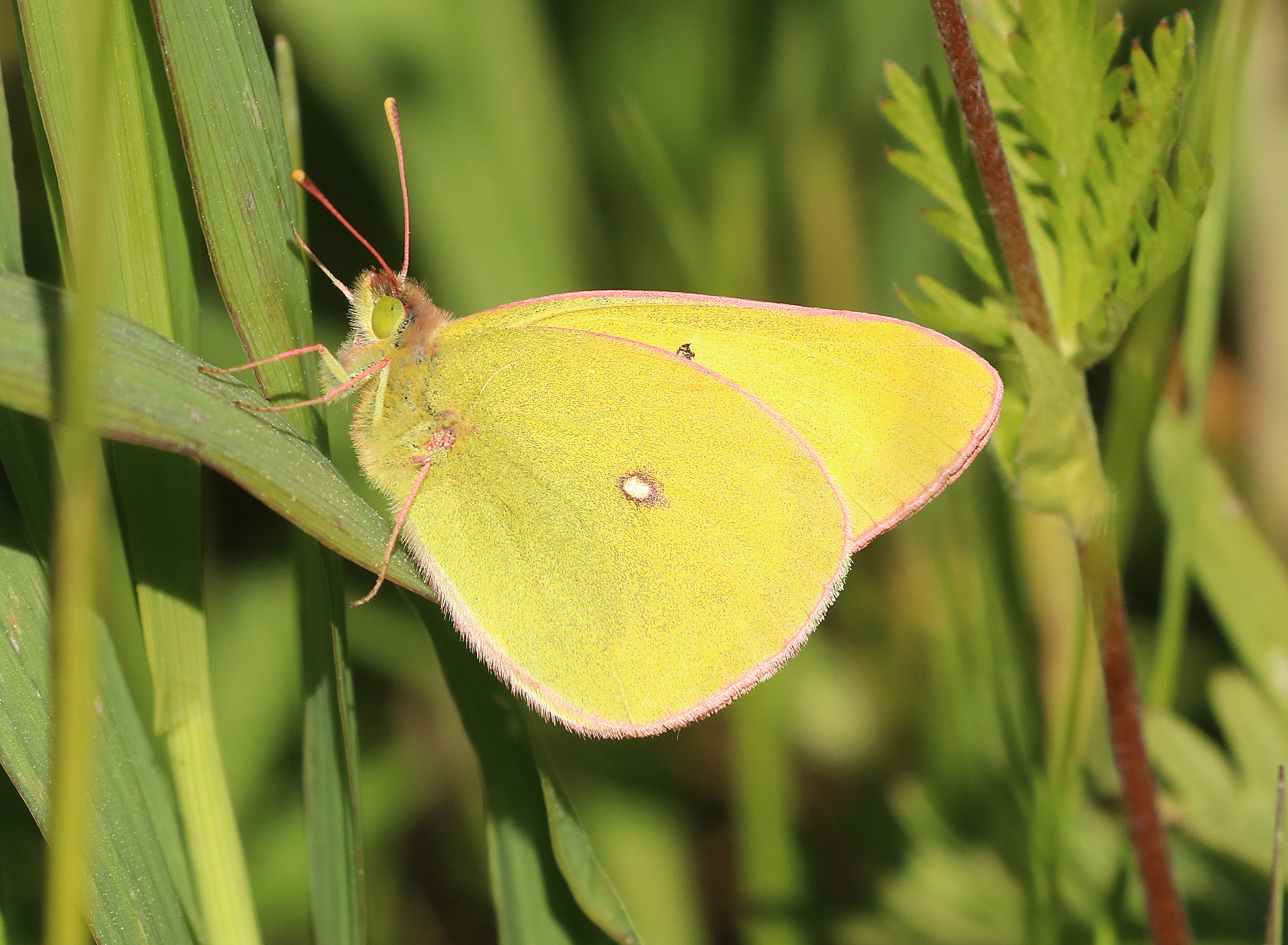

Conservation status
- Apparently Secure (NatureServe)

Scientific classification
- Kingdom: Animalia
- Phylum: Arthropoda
- Clade: Pancrustacea
- Class: Insecta
- Order: Lepidoptera
- Family: Pieridae
- Genus: Colias
- Species: C. occidentalis

Binomial name
- Colias occidentalis Scudder, 1862

Synonyms
- Eurymus occidentalis Dyar, 1903

= Colias occidentalis =

Species of butterfly

Colias occidentalis, the western sulphur or golden sulphur, is a butterfly in the family Pieridae found in North America. Its range includes the Pacific Northwest and parts of British Columbia.

The one flight period is from late May until early July. Its habitats include ocean bluffs, forest openings, mountain slopes, and subalpine meadows.

== Description ==
The golden sulphur is large and yellow with a single white spot on the hindwing surrounded by a red ring. There is rarely a satellite spot. Its wingspan ranges from 50 millimetres (2.0 in) to 53 millimetres (2.1 in). Males do not reflect ultraviolet. Females have a rare white morph (alba).

== Host plants ==
- Vicia angustifolia
- Lathyrus lanszwertii
- Lupinus latifolius
- Melilotus alba

Its larvae feed on flowers like the Vicia spp., Lupinus spp., Lathyrus spp., and Thermopsis spp.

== Subspecies ==
Listed alphabetically.

- C. o. chrysomelas H. Edwards, 1877 (California, Oregon)
- C. o. occidentalis (British Columbia, Washington, Oregon)
- C. o. sullivani Hammond & McCorkle, 2003 (Oregon)
