= Astragalus lentiginosus var. pseudiodanthus =

Scientific classification
- Kingdom: Plantae
- Clade: Tracheophytes
- Clade: Angiosperms
- Clade: Eudicots
- Clade: Rosids
- Order: Fabales
- Family: Fabaceae
- Subfamily: Faboideae
- Genus: Astragalus
- Species: A. lentiginosus
- Variety: A. l. var. pseudiodanthus

Trinomial name
- Astragalus lentiginosus var. pseudiodanthus (Barneby) J.A.Alexander

Synonyms
- Astragalus iodanthus var. pseudiodanthus (Barneby) Isely; Astragalus pseudiodanthus Barneby

Species of legume

Astragalus lentiginosus var. pseudiodanthus, synonym Astragalus pseudiodanthus, is a variety of the species Astragalus lentiginosus, a milkvetch. It is known by the common name Tonopah milkvetch. It is native to the Great Basin deserts of Nevada and eastern California, such as the Tonopah area, where it grows in sandy habitat.

This plant is named for the very similar Astragalus iodanthus, of which it is sometimes treated as a variety.

== Description ==
This is a small mat-forming perennial herb extending several stems from a stem base which lies beneath the surface of the sand. The leaves are up to 5 centimeters long and are made up of small crowded leaflets. The inflorescence is a cluster of reddish purple flowers.

The fruit is a legume pod up to about 2.5 centimeters long. It is fleshy when new and dries to a leathery texture.
