= Phaca parviflora =

Phaca parviflora can refer to the following plant species:

- Phaca parviflora Nutt., a synonym of Astragalus eucosmus B.L.Rob.
- Phaca parviflora Turcz., a synonym of Astragalus frigidus (L.) A.Gray
