= Karada =

Karada may refer to:

- Karada, India, a settlement in Kodagu district, Karnataka
- Bondage rope harness, a rope bondage technique
- Cleistanthus collinus, a toxic tree whose bark contains leucodelphinidin
- Karhade Brahmin, a Hindu tribe in India

== See also ==
- Karrada, a suburb of Baghdad
  - 2016 Karrada bombing
