= Leucoanthocyanidin reductase =

Enzyme

Identifiers
- EC no.: 1.17.1.3
- CAS no.: 93389-48-1

Databases
- IntEnz: IntEnz view
- BRENDA: BRENDA entry
- ExPASy: NiceZyme view
- KEGG: KEGG entry
- MetaCyc: metabolic pathway
- PRIAM: profile
- PDB structures: RCSB PDB PDBe PDBsum
- Gene Ontology: AmiGO / QuickGO
Search
- PMC: articles
- PubMed: articles
- NCBI: proteins

Leucoanthocyanidin reductase (EC 1.17.1.3) (LAR, aka leucocyanidin reductase or LCR) is an enzyme that catalyzes several related chemical reduction steps in flavonoid biosynthesis. For example, it converts leucocyanidin to catechin.

leucocyanidin
+ NADPH
H^{+}
H_{2}O
catechin
+ NADP^{+}

The three substrates of this enzyme are leucocyanidin, reduced nicotinamide adenine dinucleotide phosphate (NADPH), and a proton. Its products are catechin, oxidised NADP^{+}, and water.

This enzyme is an oxidoreductase, with the systematic name (2R,3S)-catechin:NADP^{+} 4-oxidoreductase. It is also called leucocyanidin reductase.

== Other reactions catalysed ==
The enzyme also converts leucopelargonidin to afzelechin and leucodelphinidin to gallocatechol:

leucopelargonidin
+ NADPH
H^{+}
H_{2}O
afzelechin
+ NADP^{+}
leucodelphinidin
+ NADPH
H^{+}
H_{2}O
(+)-gallocatechol
+ NADP^{+}

It can be found in the plant Hedysarum sulphurescens and in Vitis vinifera (grape).
