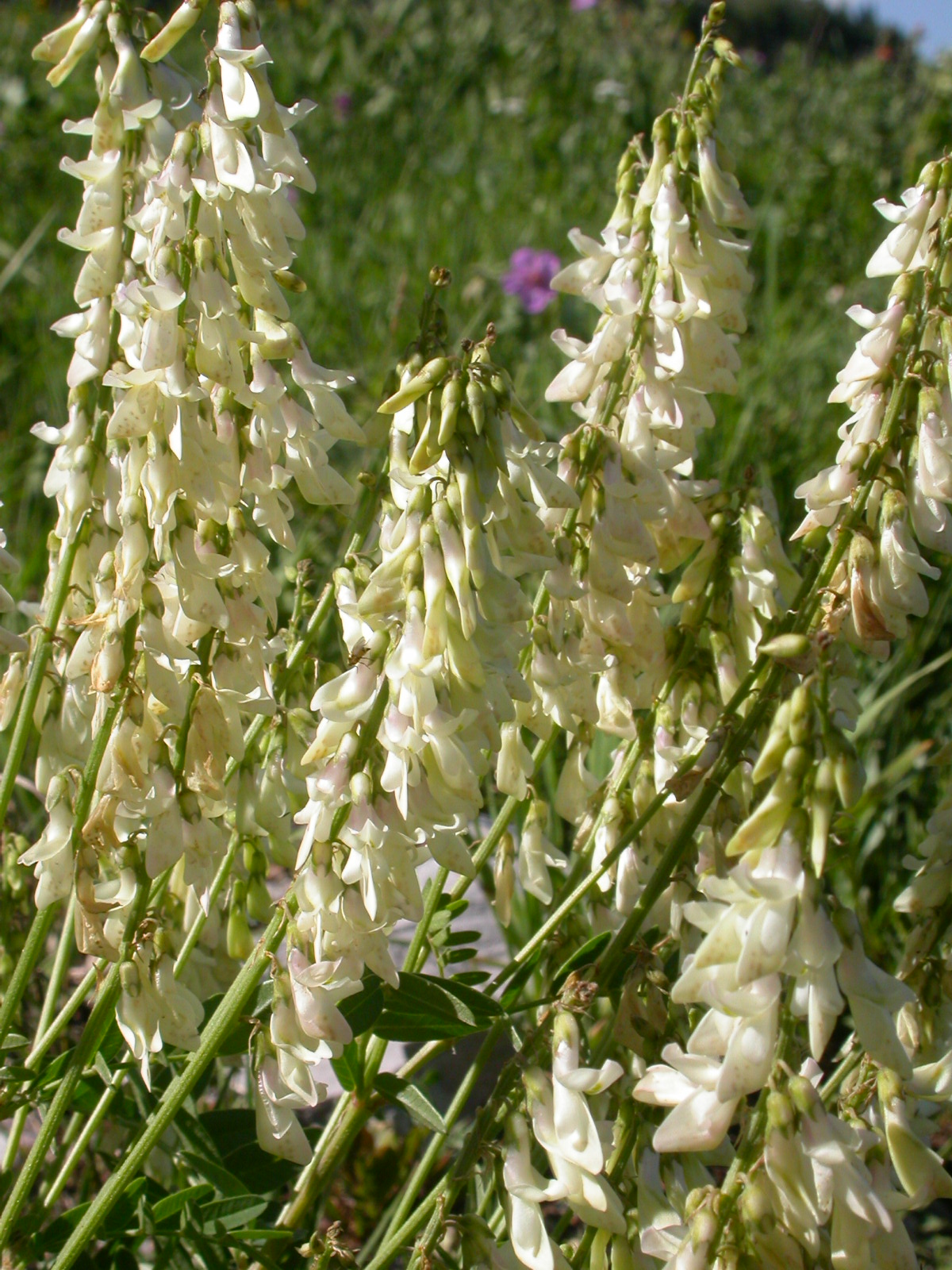

Scientific classification
- Kingdom: Plantae
- Clade: Tracheophytes
- Clade: Angiosperms
- Clade: Eudicots
- Clade: Rosids
- Order: Fabales
- Family: Fabaceae
- Subfamily: Faboideae
- Genus: Hedysarum
- Species: H. sulphurescens

Binomial name
- Hedysarum sulphurescens Rydb.

= Hedysarum sulphurescens =

Species of legume

Hedysarum sulphurescens, the yellow sweetvetch or white sweetvetch, is a perennial herb species.

Leucocyanidin reductase (LCR) uses 2,3-trans-3,4-cis-leucocyanidin to produce (+)-catechin and is the first enzyme in the proanthocyanidins (PA)-specific pathway. Its activity has been measured in leaves, flowers, and seeds of H. sulfurescens.

== See also ==
- List of Canadian plants by family F
