= Michiyo Tsujimura =

Japanese agricultural and biochemist (1888–1969)

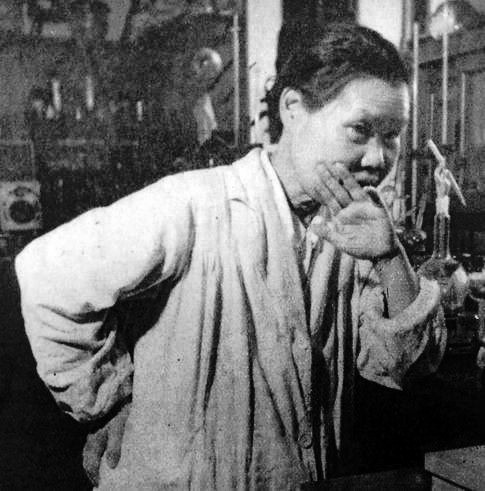
- Tsujimura in 1948
- Born: 17 September 1888; Saitama Prefecture, Empire of Japan
- Died: 1 June 1969 (aged 80); Toyohashi, Aichi, Japan
- Occupations: Agronomist, biochemist

Michiyo Tsujimura (辻村みちよ; 17 September 1888 – 1 June 1969) was a Japanese agricultural scientist and biochemist whose research focused on the components of green tea. She was the first woman in Japan to receive a doctoral degree in agriculture.

== Early life ==
Tsujimura was born in 1888 in what is now Okegawa in Saitama Prefecture. She attended Tokyo Prefecture Women's Normal School, graduating in 1909, and the Division of Biochemical Science at Tokyo Women's Higher Normal School. There, she was taught by the biologist Kono Yasui, who inspired in Tsujimura an interest in scientific research. She graduated in 1913 and became a teacher at Yokohama High School for Women in Kanagawa Prefecture. In 1917, she returned to Saitama Prefecture to teach at Saitama Women's Normal School.

== Career and research ==
Tsujimura's research career began in 1920 when she joined Hokkaido Imperial University as a laboratory assistant. At the time, the university did not accept female students, so Tsujimura worked in an unpaid position at the Food Nutritional Laboratory of the university's Agricultural Chemistry Department. There, she researched the nutrition of silkworms before transferring to the Medical Chemical Laboratory at the Medical College of Tokyo Imperial University in 1922. The laboratory was destroyed in the 1923 Great Kantō earthquake in September, so she transferred to RIKEN as a research student in October 1923. She worked in the laboratory of Umetaro Suzuki, a doctor of agriculture, and researched nutritional chemistry. Tsujimura and her colleague Seitaro Miura discovered vitamin C in green tea in 1924, and published an article titled "On Vitamin C in Green Tea" in the journal Bioscience, Biotechnology, and Biochemistry. This finding contributed to an increase in green tea exports to North America.

In 1929, Tsujimura isolated the flavonoid catechin from green tea. She extracted tannin in crystal form from green tea in 1930. Her thesis on the constituents of green tea, titled "On the Chemical Components of Green Tea", earned her a doctorate in agriculture from Tokyo Imperial University in 1932, making her the first woman in Japan to receive such a degree. She went on to isolate gallocatechin from green tea in 1934 and registered a patent on her method of extracting vitamin C crystals from plants in 1935. She was promoted to the role of junior researcher at RIKEN in 1942 and then researcher in 1947 before becoming a professor at Ochanomizu University when it was established in 1949. She was a professor at Tokyo Women's Higher Normal School from 1950 and was the school's first dean of the Faculty of Home Economics.

== Retirement, death, and legacy ==
Tsujimura retired from Ochanomizu University as a professor in 1956, but continued lecturing part-time until 1961. She was a professor at Jissen Women's University in Tokyo from 1955 to 1963, when she became a professor emeritus. She was awarded the Japan Prize of Agricultural Science in 1956 for her research on green tea and was conferred the Order of the Precious Crown of the Fourth Class in 1968. She died in Toyohashi on 1 June 1969 at the age of 80.

Tsujimura's 133rd birthday was celebrated with a Google Doodle on September 16, 2021.

== See also ==
- Timeline of women in science
