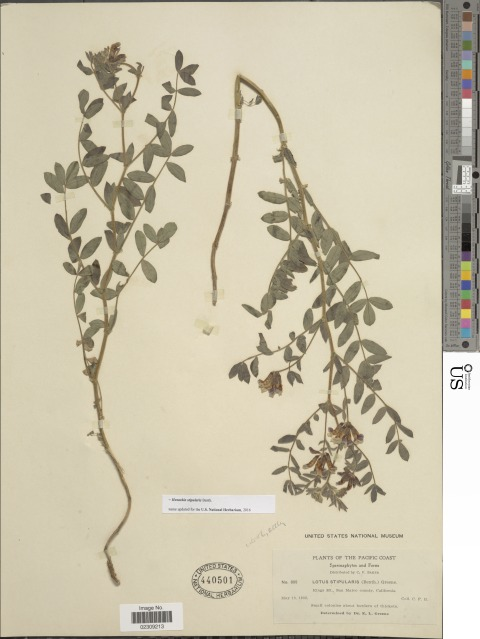

Scientific classification
- Kingdom: Plantae
- Clade: Tracheophytes
- Clade: Angiosperms
- Clade: Eudicots
- Clade: Rosids
- Order: Fabales
- Family: Fabaceae
- Subfamily: Faboideae
- Genus: Hosackia
- Species: H. stipularis

Binomial name
- Hosackia stipularis Benth.

Synonyms
- Hosackia balsamifera Kellogg; Hosackia macrophylla Kellogg; Hosackia stipularis subsp. balsamifera (Kellogg) Abrams; Hosackia stipularis var. ottleyi (Isely) Brouillet; Lotus balsamiferus Greene; Lotus purpurascens Eastw.; Lotus stipularis Greene; Lotus stipularis var. ottleyi Isely

= Hosackia stipularis =

Species of legume

Hosackia stipularis, synonym Lotus stipularis, is a species of legume endemic to California. It is known by the common name balsam bird's-foot trefoil. It is found in most of the northern and central coastal and inland mountain ranges and foothills. It can be found in many types of habitat, including forest, chaparral, and disturbed areas.

== Description ==
It is a mostly erect perennial herb with a leafy, often hairy and glandular form. Its slender branches are lined with leaves each made of several leaflets up to 2 centimeters long. The leaves sometimes have prominent stipules. The inflorescence is a compact array of up to 9 pink flowers. Each flower is elongated, the corolla borne in a tubular calyx of sepals, and the entire unit may exceed a centimeter long. The fruit is a legume pod 2 or 3 centimeters long containing several beanlike seeds.
