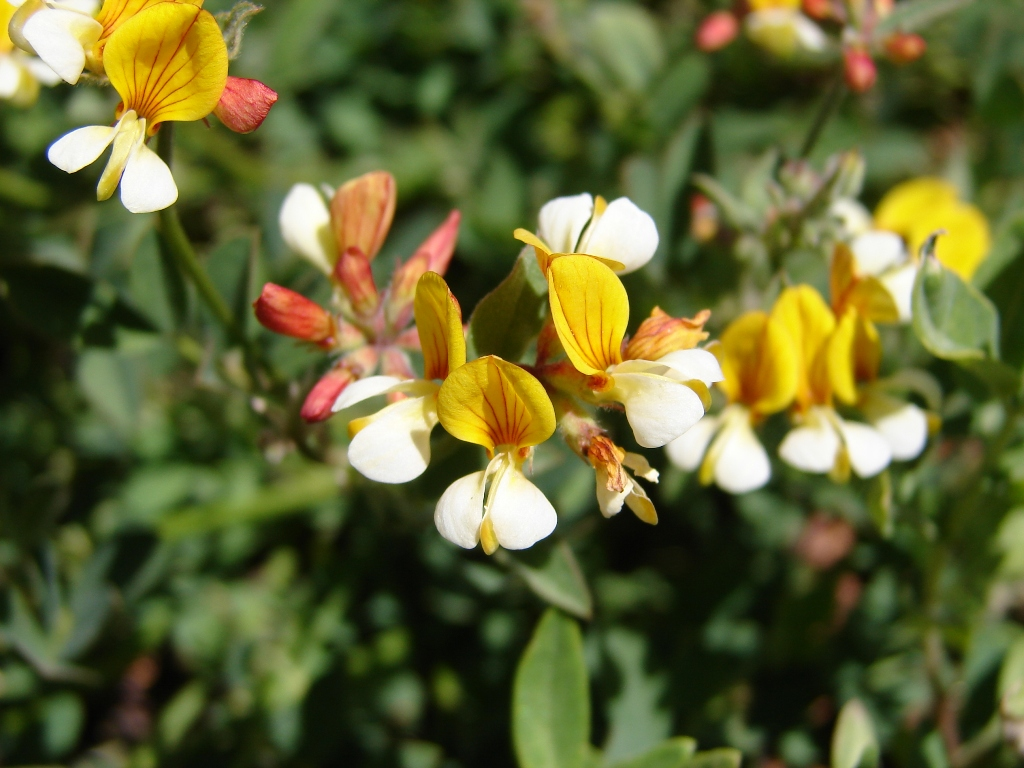
- Hosackia oblongifolia

Scientific classification
- Kingdom: Plantae
- Clade: Tracheophytes
- Clade: Angiosperms
- Clade: Eudicots
- Clade: Rosids
- Order: Fabales
- Family: Fabaceae
- Subfamily: Faboideae
- Tribe: Loteae
- Genus: Hosackia; Douglas ex Benth. (1829)

Species
- See text.

Synonyms
- Rafinesquia Raf. (1838)

= Hosackia =

Genus of legumes

Hosackia is a genus of flowering plants in the family Fabaceae (legumes). It is native to western North America, from British Columbia in Canada to Mexico.

== Taxonomy ==
Hosackia belongs to a group of species traditionally placed in the tribe Loteae of the subfamily Faboideae. The taxonomy of this group is complex, and its division into genera has varied considerably. Many species of Hosackia were formerly placed in a broadly defined genus Lotus. A molecular phylogenetic study in 2000 based on nuclear ribosomal ITS sequences confirmed the view that the "New World" (American) and "Old World" (African and Eurasian) species of Lotus did not belong in the same genus. When narrowly circumscribed, Hosackia was monophyletic. New World species at one time placed in Hosackia have been transferred to Acmispon, Ottleya and Syrmatium.

=== Species ===
As of August 2023, Plants of the World Online accepted the following species:

- Hosackia crassifolia Benth.
- Hosackia gracilis Benth.
- Hosackia hintoniorum (B.L.Turner) D.D.Sokoloff
- Hosackia incana Torr.
- Hosackia oaxacana Greenm.
- Hosackia oblongifolia Benth.
- Hosackia pinnata (Hook.) Abrams
- Hosackia repens G.Don
- Hosackia rosea Eastw.
- Hosackia stipularis Benth.
- Hosackia yollabolliensis (Munz) D.D.Sokoloff
