= Hosackia repens =

Scientific classification
- Kingdom: Plantae
- Clade: Tracheophytes
- Clade: Angiosperms
- Clade: Eudicots
- Clade: Rosids
- Order: Fabales
- Family: Fabaceae
- Subfamily: Faboideae
- Genus: Hosackia
- Species: H. repens

Binomial name
- Hosackia repens G.Don

Synonyms
- Hosackia oaxacana

Species of plant

Hosackia repens is a plant in the genus Hosackia native to Mexico.

== Conservation status ==
This species is Least Concern according to the Kew database.

== Identification ==
This species is identified by its small yellow flowers, trailing habit, and semi hairy leaves.
