= Hosackia yollabolliensis =

Scientific classification
- Kingdom: Plantae
- Clade: Tracheophytes
- Clade: Angiosperms
- Clade: Eudicots
- Clade: Rosids
- Order: Fabales
- Family: Fabaceae
- Subfamily: Faboideae
- Genus: Hosackia
- Species: H. yollabolliensis

Binomial name
- Hosackia yollabolliensis (Munz) D.D.Sokoloff

Synonyms
- Lotus yollabolliensis Munz

Species of legume

Hosackia yollabolliensis is a species of flowering plant in the family Fabaceae, native to California. It was first described, as Lotus yollabolliensis, by Philip A. Munz in 1955. It was transferred to Hosackia by D.D. Sokoloff in 2000. It is also known as the Yolla Bolly Mountains bird's-foot trefoil.
