= Astragalus lentiginosus var. bryantii =

Scientific classification
- Kingdom: Plantae
- Clade: Tracheophytes
- Clade: Angiosperms
- Clade: Eudicots
- Clade: Rosids
- Order: Fabales
- Family: Fabaceae
- Subfamily: Faboideae
- Genus: Astragalus
- Species: A. lentiginosus
- Variety: A. l. var. bryantii

Trinomial name
- Astragalus lentiginosus var. bryantii (Barneby) J.A.Alexander

Synonyms
- Astragalus bryantii Barneby

Variety of legume

Astragalus lentiginosus var. bryantii, synonym Astragalus bryantii, is a variety of Astragalus lentiginosus, a milkvetch in the family Fabaceae.
