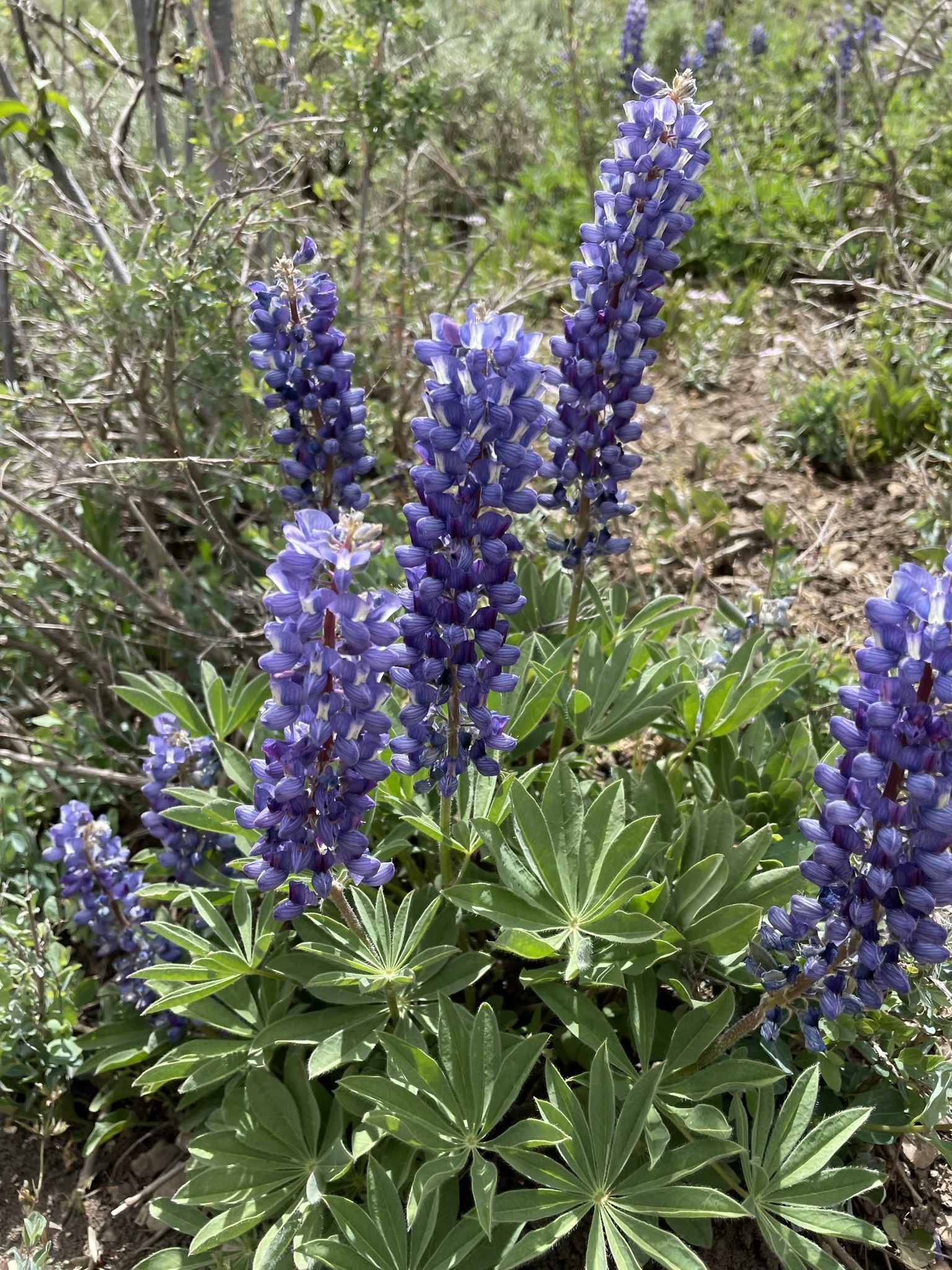

Conservation status
- Secure (NatureServe)

Scientific classification
- Kingdom: Plantae
- Clade: Tracheophytes
- Clade: Angiosperms
- Clade: Eudicots
- Clade: Rosids
- Order: Fabales
- Family: Fabaceae
- Subfamily: Faboideae
- Genus: Lupinus
- Species: L. prunophilus

Binomial name
- Lupinus prunophilus M.E.Jones

Synonyms
- List: Lupinus amplus Greene; Lupinus arcticus var. prunophilus (M.E.Jones) C.P.Sm.; Lupinus bakeri subsp. amplus (Greene) Fleak & D.B.Dunn; Lupinus polyphyllus var. prunophilus (M.E.Jones) L.Ll.Phillips; Lupinus sericeus subsp. amplus (Greene) Fleak & D.B.Dunn; Lupinus wyethii var. prunophilus (M.E.Jones) C.P.Sm.

= Lupinus prunophilus =

Species of flowering plant in the family Fabaceae

Lupinus prunophilus, commonly known as the hairy bigleaf lupine or chokecherry lupin, is a medium-sized herbaceous plant that grows in the Great Basin and other parts of the western United States between the Sierra Nevada and the Rockies. Some botanists consider it a subspecies of L. polyphyllus.

== Description ==
Lupinus prunophilus is a herbaceous perennial plant that start the growing season with many leaves on short stalks growing basally (basal leaves) and retain these leaves as the much taller flowering stem grows and start to bloom. The multiple flowering stems grow outward and then upward (ascending), reaching 23–65 centimeters (9–25 1/2 inches) tall. David Baxter Dunn described the stems as either slim or somewhat hollow (somewhat fistulose). The stems are sparsely covered in coarse hairs that stand out straight from the stem surface (spreading-hirsute). Both the basal leaves and the flowering stems arise from a woody caudex.

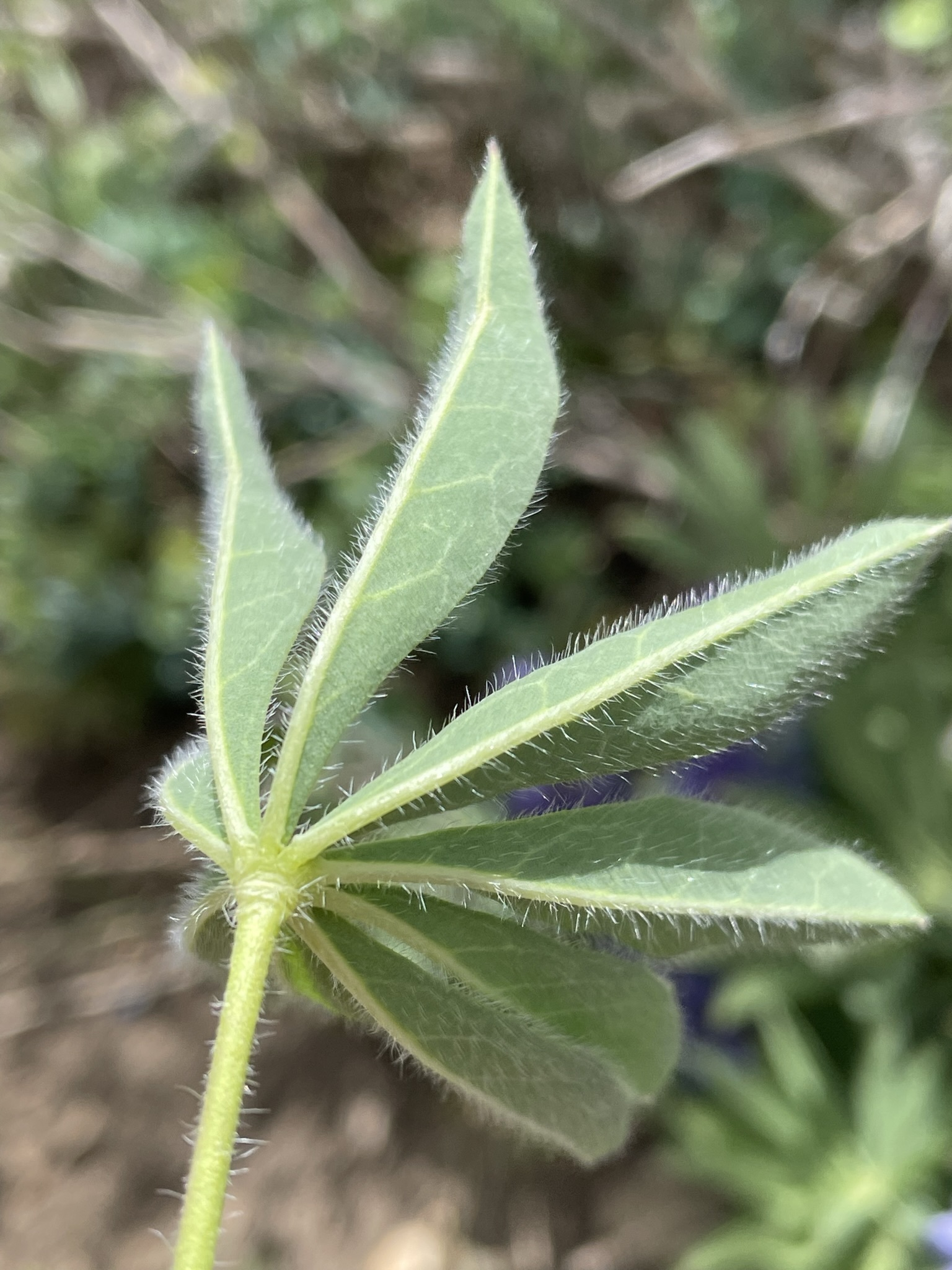
Underside of leaf

The basal leaves are much more numerous, with the 7–30 cm (3–12 in)–long leaf stems (petioles) spreading in every direction to from a rounded tuft of leaves. Each leaf is made up of 8–13 small leaflets, each leaflet being 4–8 cm (1 1/2–3 in) long and rarely less than 10 millimeters (1/2 in) wide. The leaflets are flat and much longer than they are wide with the widest portion towards the tip rather than towards the base (oblanceolate). The leaflets are on smaller stalks that are 4–10 cm (1 1/2–4 in) long and attached together at a central point (palmate compound) to the leaf stalk, one of the defining features of Lupinus. The leaves are smooth on their upper sides (glabrous) with, at most, only a few hairs on the leaf edges. On the underside they are sparsely covered in fine downy hairs. It has some leaves shorter leaf stalks growing from the flowing stem.

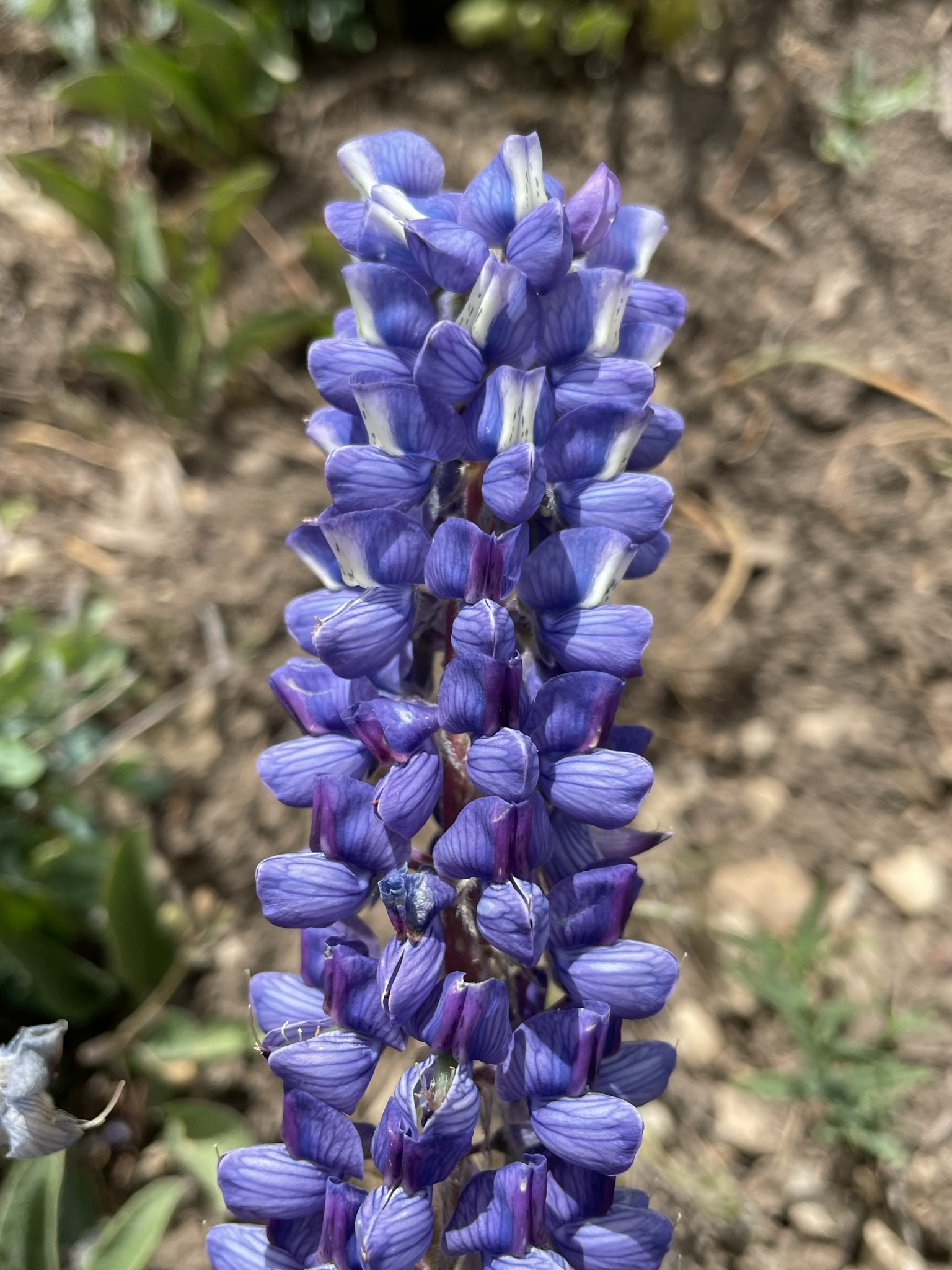
Flower in White Pine County, Nevada

The flowering part of each stalk (the raceme) will have 25–68 flowers and be 6–28 cm (2 1/2–11 in) long. Each flower is 10–16 mm (3/8–5/8 in) long and mainly blue-purple in color, but with a cream or yellow "eyespot" on the banner petal. The upper side of the flower is hairless but will a few fine hairs (ciliate) inside the lower lip also called the keel.

The seed pods will have 4–6 seeds and each seed is 7–11 mm (1/4–3/8 in) wide.

== Taxonomy ==
Marcus E. Jones first wrote a short description of Lupinus prunophilus in 1910. The Lupinus expert Charles Piper Smith initially thought it was Lupinus wyethii var. prunophilus in 1937. Three years later, when he published his comprehensive book about the genus, Species Lupinorum, he classified it as a subspecies with the name Lupinus arcticus var. prunophilus. Further taxonomic disagreement followed with Lyle Llewellyn Phillips describing it as Lupinus polyphyllus var. prunophilus in 1955. Lewis S. Fleak and David B. Dunn published a 1971 paper dividing it between two subspecies, Lupinus bakeri subsp. amplus and Lupinus sericeus subsp. amplus.

A 2005 molecular study suggests that most western North American lupines, including L. prunophilus and its relatives L. polyphyllus and L. wyethii, may consitute a monophyletic clade. As of 2023, the Natural Resources Conservation Service PLANTS database, World Flora Online, and Plants of the World Online all list Lupinus prunophilus as the accepted taxonomic name. However, there is still disagreement with noted botanists such as Jennifer Ackerfield following classifications such as L. polyphyllus var. prunophilus.

=== Etymology ===
The genus Lupinus is from the Latin lupus ('wolf').

Regardless of its correct classification, it is most commonly called the "hairy bigleaf lupin", for the hairy leaves distinguishing it from the "bigleaf lupin", L. polyphyllus. Another common name, "chokecherry lupine" referring to the Latin pronophilus meaning "choke cherry loving".

== Distribution ==
The native range is the interior of the western United States including the states of California, Colorado, Idaho, Nevada, New Mexico, Oregon, Utah, Washington, and Wyoming. In the Southern Rocky Mountains, it is rarely found in New Mexico, being more often found in Wyoming and the western slope in Colorado. It is found in many places in Idaho, Nevada, and Utah, but is restricted to eastern areas of California, Washington, and Oregon. There are also a few records of it being found in Montana, but its status there is uncertain.

Lupinus prunophilus was evaluated by NatureServe as globally secure (G5) in 1993. At the state level it was only evaluated in Wyoming, where it was given the status of imperiled (S2).
