= Gallocatechol =

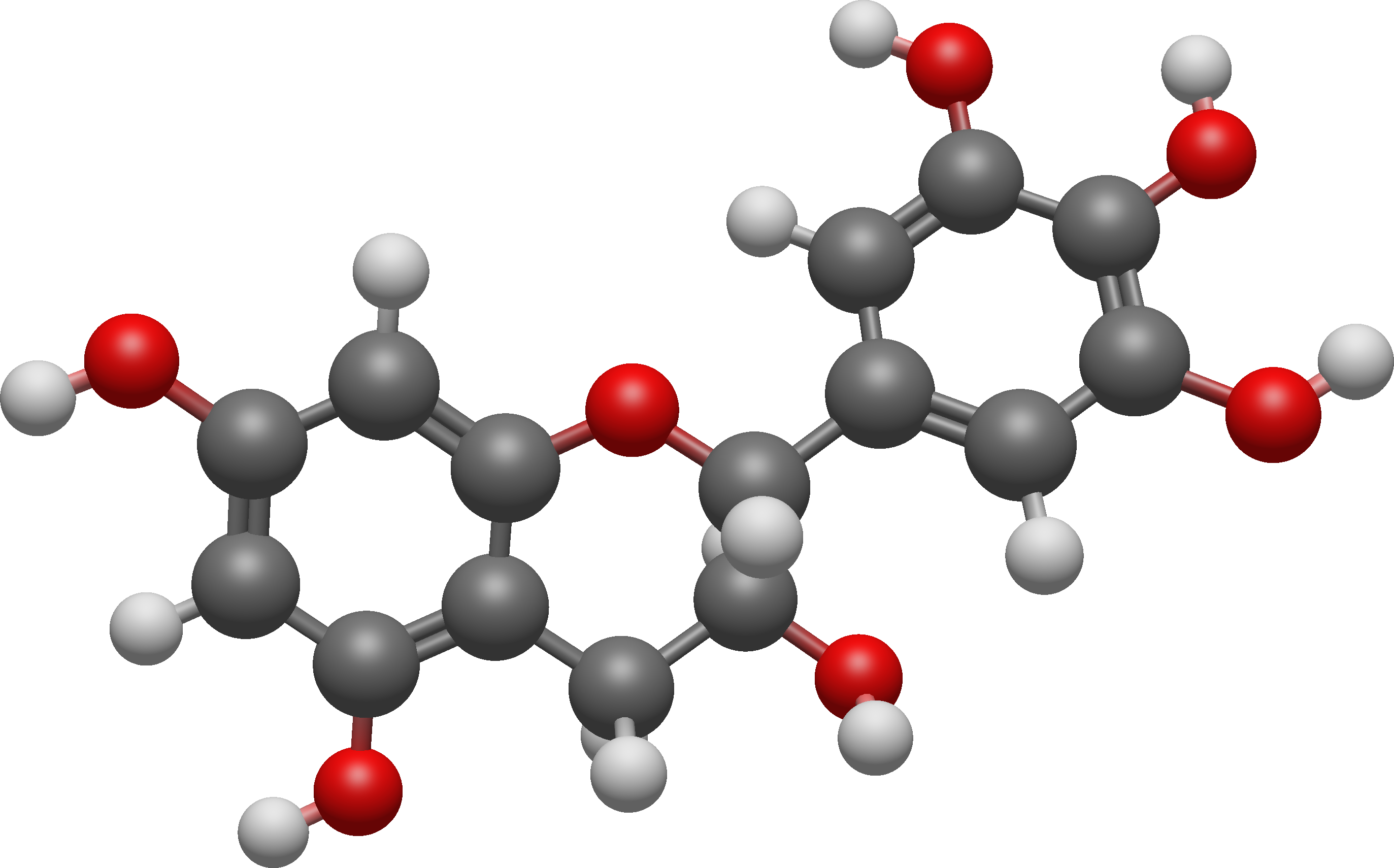

Names
- Other names (+)-Gallocatechin

Identifiers
CAS Number	970-73-0
3D model (JSmol)	Interactive image
ChEBI	CHEBI:68330
ChEMBL	ChEMBL125743
ChemSpider	58594
KEGG	C12127
MeSH	Gallocatechol
PubChem CID	65084
UNII	HEJ6575V1X
- InChI: InChI=1S/C15H14O7/c16-7-3-9(17)8-5-12(20)15(22-13(8)4-7)6-1-10(18)14(21)11(19)2-6/h1-4,12,15-21H,5H2/t12-,15+/m0/s1 Key: XMOCLSLCDHWDHP-SWLSCSKDSA-N
- SMILES: C1[C@@H]([C@H](OC2=CC(=CC(=C21)O)O)C3=CC(=C(C(=C3)O)O)O)O

Properties
Chemical formula	C_{15}H_{14}O_{7}
Molar mass	306.270 g·mol^{−1}
- Except where otherwise noted, data are given for materials in their standard state (at 25 °C [77 °F], 100 kPa). Infobox references

Gallocatechol or gallocatechin (GC) is a flavan-3-ol, a type of chemical compound including catechin, with the gallate residue being in an isomeric trans position.

This compound possesses two epimers. The most common, (+)-gallocatechin (GC), is found notably in green tea. The other enantiomer is called (−)-gallocatechin or ent-gallocatechin. It was first isolated from green tea by Michiyo Tsujimura in 1934.

Epigallocatechin is another type of catechin, with the gallate residue being in an isomeric cis position. It can be found in St John's wort.

== Biosynthesis ==
In the flavonoid biosynthesis pathway in plants, (+)-gallocatechol is produced in two steps from ampelopsin via leucodelphinidin:

ampelopsin
leucodelphinidin
(+)-gallocatechol

The two enzymes, dihydroflavonol 4-reductase and leucoanthocyanidin reductase, both use nicotinamide adenine dinucleotide phosphate as cofactors.

== See also ==
- Epigallocatechin gallate
- Prodelphinidin
- List of phytochemicals in food
