= Hosackia hintoniorum =

Scientific classification
- Kingdom: Plantae
- Clade: Tracheophytes
- Clade: Angiosperms
- Clade: Eudicots
- Clade: Rosids
- Order: Fabales
- Family: Fabaceae
- Subfamily: Faboideae
- Genus: Hosackia
- Species: H. hintoniorum

Binomial name
- Hosackia hintoniorum (B.L.Turner) D.D.Sokoloff

Synonyms
- Lotus hintoniorum B.L.Turner

Species of legume

Hosackia hintoniorum is a species in the genus Hosackia native to NE Mexico.

== Taxonomy ==
This species was first described as Lotus hintoniorum in 1993.
