= Hosackia incana =

Scientific classification
- Kingdom: Plantae
- Clade: Tracheophytes
- Clade: Angiosperms
- Clade: Eudicots
- Clade: Rosids
- Order: Fabales
- Family: Fabaceae
- Subfamily: Faboideae
- Genus: Hosackia
- Species: H. incana

Binomial name
- Hosackia incana Torr.

Synonyms
- Lotus incanus (Torr.) Greene; Lotus neoincanus Munz

Species of legume

Hosackia incana, synonym Lotus incanus, is a species of legume native to California. It is known by the common name woolly bird's-foot trefoil. It is endemic to the Sierra Nevada of California, where it grows in forests and other mountain habitat.

== Description ==
Hosackia incana is a hairy, erect perennial herb lined with leaves each made up of silky-haired oval leaflets up to 1.6 centimeters (2/3 in) long. The inflorescence bears 3 to 8 red-veined or pinkish white pealike flowers each up to about 2 centimeters (3/4 in) long. The fruit is a narrow, mostly hairless legume pod up to 3.5 centimeters (1 5/12 in) long.
