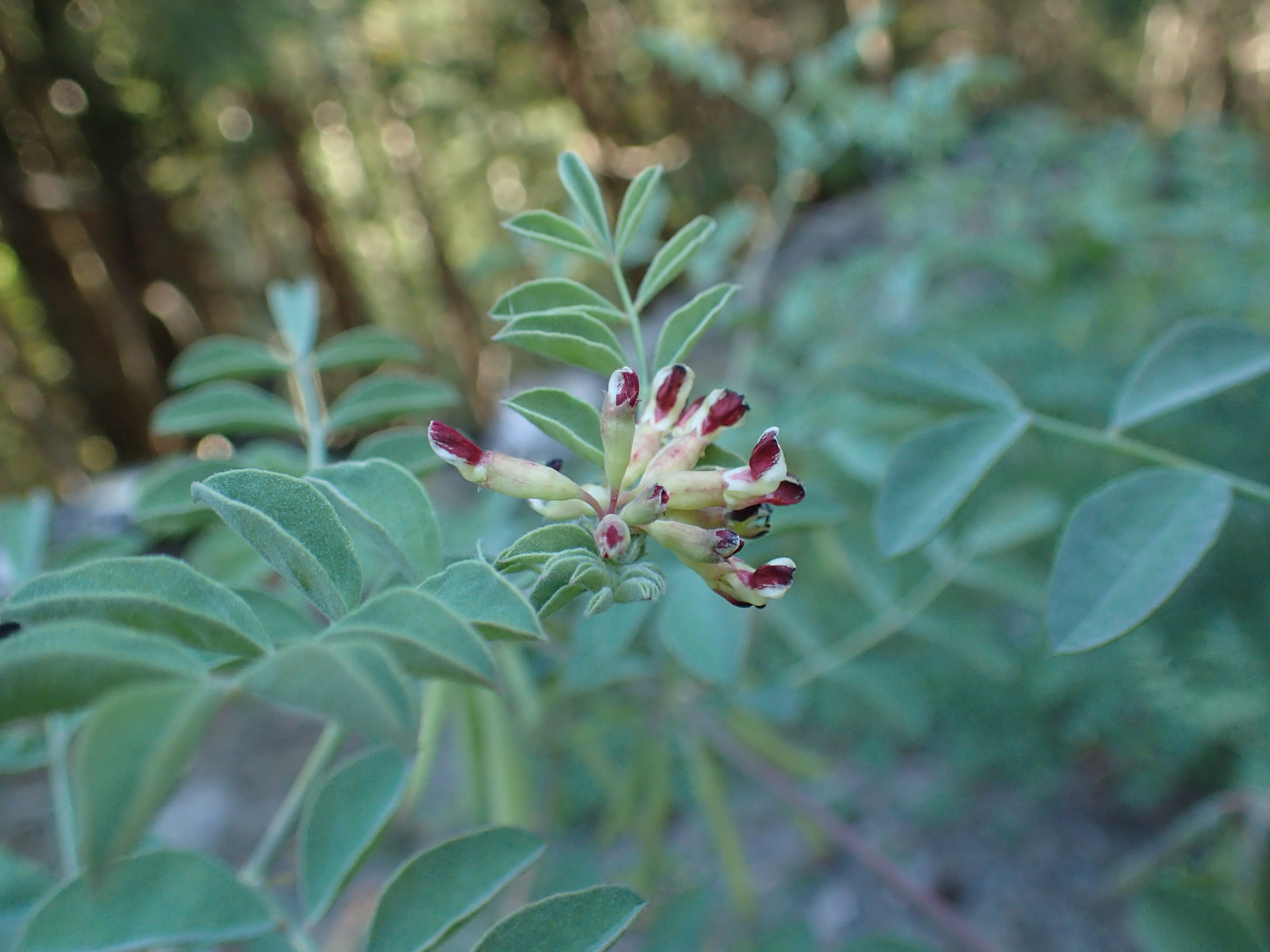

Scientific classification
- Kingdom: Plantae
- Clade: Tracheophytes
- Clade: Angiosperms
- Clade: Eudicots
- Clade: Rosids
- Order: Fabales
- Family: Fabaceae
- Subfamily: Faboideae
- Genus: Hosackia
- Species: H. crassifolia

Binomial name
- Hosackia crassifolia Benth.

Synonyms
- Hosackia platycarpa Nutt.; Hosackia stolonifera Lindl.; Lotus crassifolius (Benth.) Greene

= Hosackia crassifolia =

Species of legume

Hosackia crassifolia, synonym Lotus crassifolius, is a species of legume found in the western United States. It is known by the common names big deervetch and broad-leafed lotus.

== Distribution ==
The plant is native to western North America, in California, Oregon, and Washington (U.S. states); and into Baja California (Méxican state).

The California populations are found in diverse habitats, including chaparral, California oak woodland, California mixed evergreen forest, and conifer forest.

== Description ==
Hosackia crassifolia is a long-lived, somewhat bushy plant which bears long straight stems with evenly spaced oval-shaped leaves.

It produces thick bunches of yellow, pink-and-yellow, or scarlet-and-yellow pea flowers. The bloom period is May to August.

The brownish pea pods contain speckled red or brown peas.

=== Varieties ===
- Hosackia crassifolia var. crassifolia — broad-leafed lotus (formerly Lotus crassifolius var. crassifolius).
- Hosackia crassifolia var. otayensis — Otay Mountain lotus, Otay Mountain hosackia (formerly Lotus crassifolius var. otayensis), endemic to Otay Mountain in the San Ysidro Mountains of San Diego County, California. It is a critically endangered species.
