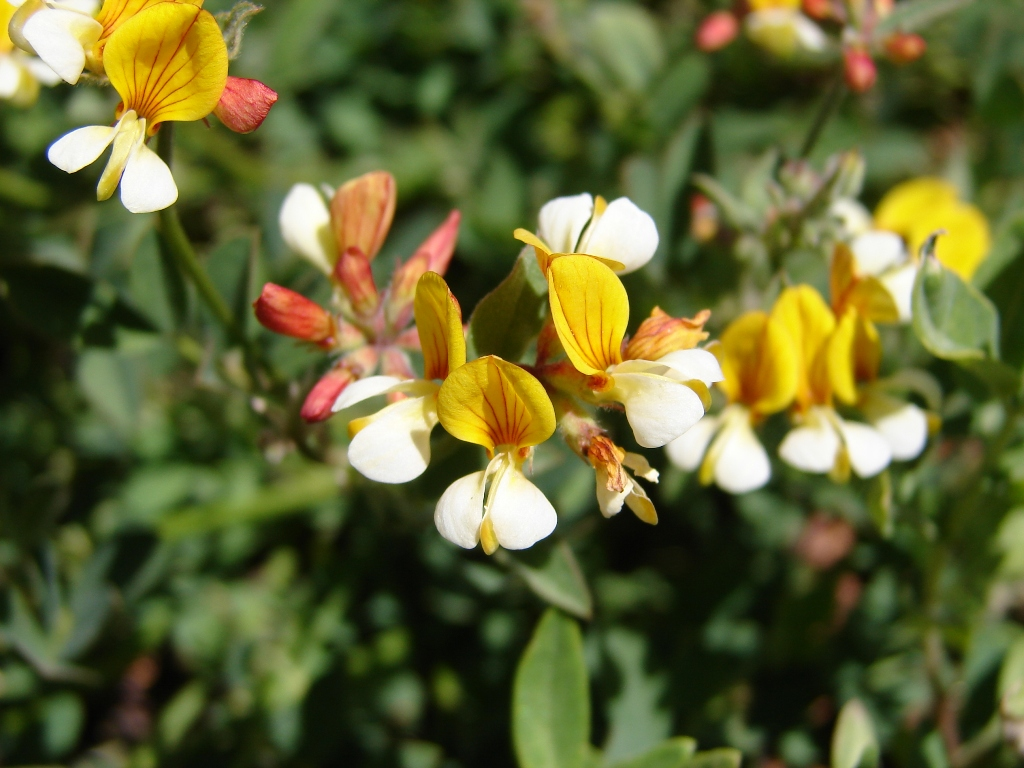

Scientific classification
- Kingdom: Plantae
- Clade: Tracheophytes
- Clade: Angiosperms
- Clade: Eudicots
- Clade: Rosids
- Order: Fabales
- Family: Fabaceae
- Subfamily: Faboideae
- Genus: Hosackia
- Species: H. oblongifolia

Binomial name
- Hosackia oblongifolia Benth.

Synonyms
- Hosackia cuprea Smiley; Hosackia lathyroides Durand & Hilg.; Hosackia oblongifolia var. cuprea (Greene) Brouillet; Hosackia torreyi A.Gray; Hosackia torreyi var. nevadensis A.Gray; Lotus cupreus Greene; Lotus lathyroides Greene; Lotus oblongifolius Greene; Lotus oblongifolius var. cupreus Ottley; Lotus oblongifolius var. nevadensis (A.Gray) Munz; Lotus oblongifolius var. torreyi Ottley; Lotus torreyi Greene; Lotus torreyi var. seorsus J.F.Macbr.

= Hosackia oblongifolia =

Species of legume

Hosackia oblongifolia, synonym Lotus oblongifolius, is a species of legume native to western North America from Oregon to northern Mexico. It is known by the common name streambank bird's-foot trefoil or meadow lotus. It grows in moist to wet areas in several types of habitat. It is a spreading or upright perennial herb lined with leaves each made up of 3 elongated oval leaflets each up to 2.5 centimeters long. The inflorescence bears several yellow and white flowers between 1 and 2 centimeters long. The fruit is very elongated, reaching up to 5 centimeters in length but just a few millimeters in width.

Plants with copper colored flowers have been separated by some sources as var. cupreus, the copper-flowered bird's-foot trefoil. They are found in the Sierra Nevada slopes of Tulare County, California.
