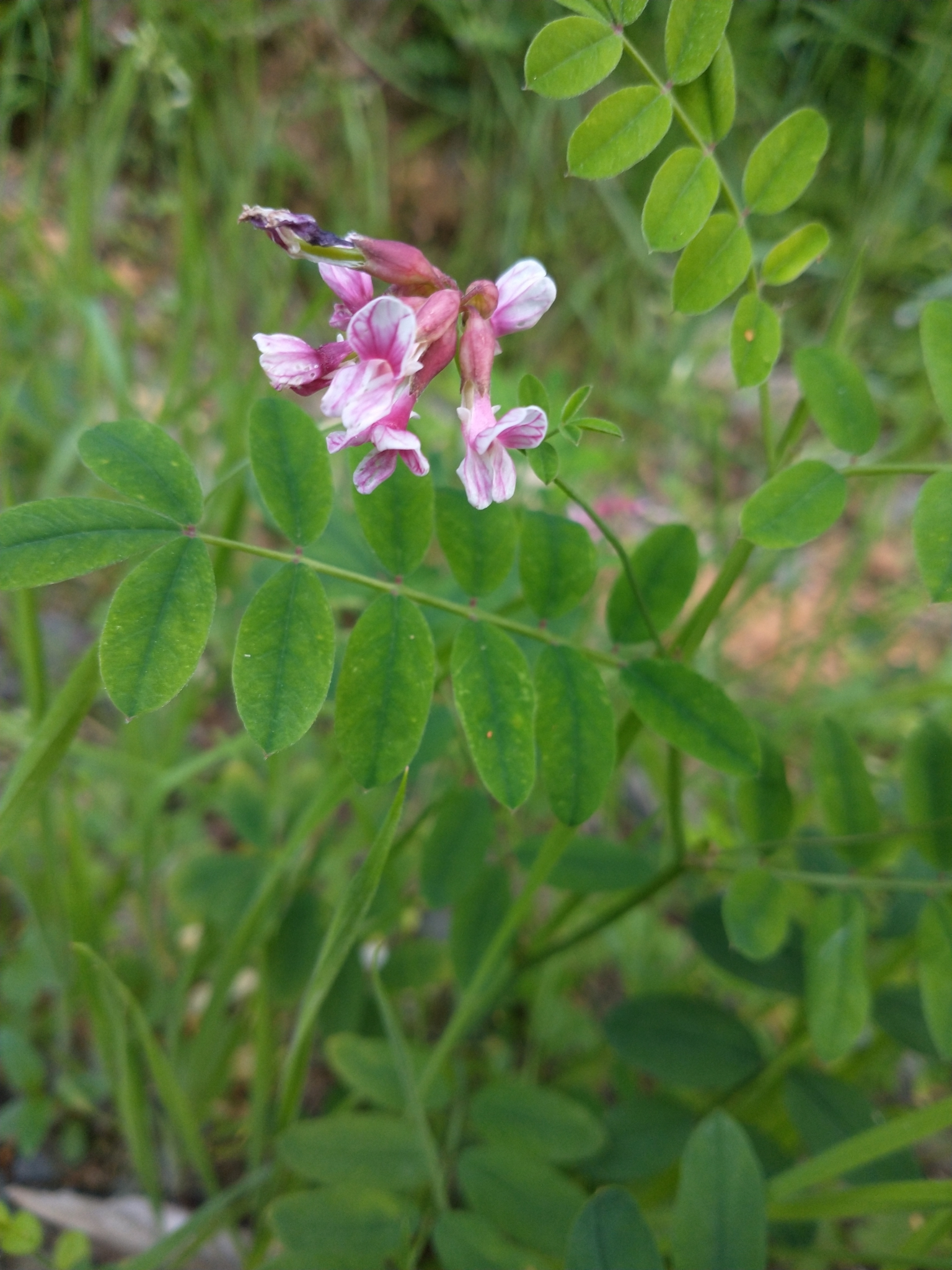

Scientific classification
- Kingdom: Plantae
- Clade: Tracheophytes
- Clade: Angiosperms
- Clade: Eudicots
- Clade: Rosids
- Order: Fabales
- Family: Fabaceae
- Subfamily: Faboideae
- Genus: Hosackia
- Species: H. rosea

Binomial name
- Hosackia rosea Eastw.

Synonyms
- Lotus aboriginus Jeps.; Lotus crassifolius var. subglaber (Ottley) C.L.Hitchc.; Lotus stipularis var. subglaber Ottley

= Hosackia rosea =

Species of legume

Hosackia rosea, synonym Lotus aboriginus, is a species of legume native to North America. It is known by the common names rosy bird's-foot trefoil and thicket trefoil. It grows in mountains and canyons, often in moist areas. It is a perennial herb lined with leaves each made up of pairs of oval leaflike leaflets 1 to 3 cm long. The inflorescence is a spray of six to 10 white or pink flowers each about 1 cm long. The flower is somewhat tubular, encased at the base in a calyx of sepals and lobed at the mouth. The fruit is a hairless elongated legume pod 3–5 cm long.

It is believed that Hosackia rosea could be a potential host plant for the caterpillars of the critically endangered lotis blue butterfly (syn. Lycaeides idas lotis, Lycaeides argyrognomon lotis, Plebejus anna lotis).
