= Hosackia pinnata =

Scientific classification
- Kingdom: Plantae
- Clade: Tracheophytes
- Clade: Angiosperms
- Clade: Eudicots
- Clade: Rosids
- Order: Fabales
- Family: Fabaceae
- Subfamily: Faboideae
- Genus: Hosackia
- Species: H. pinnata

Binomial name
- Hosackia pinnata (Hook.) Abrams

Synonyms
- Flundula comosa Raf.; Hosackia bicolor Douglas ex Benth.; Lotus bicolor (Douglas ex Benth.) Frye & Rigg; Lotus pinnatus Hook.; Rafinesquia comosa Raf.

Species of legume

Hosackia pinnata, synonym Lotus pinnatus, is a species of legume native to western North America from British Columbia to California. It is known by the common names meadow bird's-foot trefoil and bog bird's-foot trefoil. Its distribution extends into British Columbia in just a few rare occurrences near Nanaimo. It grows in moist to wet habitat, such as bogs and spring meadows. It is a hairless perennial herb lined with leaves each made up of green oval leaflets each 1 to 2.5 centimeters in length. The inflorescence is an array of up to 10 pealike flowers between 1 and 2 centimeters long. Each flower has a bright yellow banner, or upper petal, and white lower petals. The fruit is a slender, elongated legume pod up to 5 centimeters long but just a few millimeters wide.

A park in the city of Nanaimo, British Columbia, Canada, is named after it, using its superseded synonym: Lotus Pinnatus Park.
