= Lupinus vallicola =

Scientific classification
- Kingdom: Plantae
- Clade: Tracheophytes
- Clade: Angiosperms
- Clade: Eudicots
- Clade: Rosids
- Order: Fabales
- Family: Fabaceae
- Subfamily: Faboideae
- Genus: Lupinus
- Species: L. vallicola

Binomial name
- Lupinus vallicola A.Heller

Plant species native to western North America

Lupinus vallicola, also known as the open lupine, is a flowering plant in the genus Lupinus.

== Description ==
Lupinus vallicola has violet flowers that are typically 2cm in diameter and have five petals. The seeds are bean-shaped and start off green before turning a dark brown colour. They are about 1cm in length.

== Habitat ==
Commonly found in western North America, Lupinus vallicola natively grows in California, western Nevada, Oregon, and Washington, United States. It is also found in British Columbia, Canada.

Like most lupines, Lupinus vallicola grows well in moderately fertile sandy soil that is well drained. The soil quality does not have to be high, as they can grow in poor soils due to their nitrogen-fixing roots.
