= Lupinus bingenensis =

Scientific classification
- Kingdom: Plantae
- Clade: Tracheophytes
- Clade: Angiosperms
- Clade: Eudicots
- Clade: Rosids
- Order: Fabales
- Family: Fabaceae
- Subfamily: Faboideae
- Genus: Lupinus
- Species: L. bingenensis

Binomial name
- Lupinus bingenensis Suksd.

Synonyms
- Lupinus leucopsis var. bingenensis (Suksd.) C.P. Sm.

Species of legume

Lupinus bingenensis, common name bingen lupine or Suksdorf's lupine, is a plant species native to the US states of Washington, Idaho, Montana and Oregon as well as from British Columbia. Lupinus grows well in mountainous regions. The name honors the city of Bingen, in Klickitat County, Washington.

Lupinus bingenensis is a perennial herb up to 100 cm (40 inches) tall, most of the shoots covered with silky hairs. Each leaf has 9-15 leaflets, oblanceolate with pointed tips, both sides green though with whitish hairs on both sides. Flowers are blue to lavender, borne in racemes up to 20 cm (8 inches) long.

Several varietal names have been proposed, only two of which are widely recognized at present:

Lupinus bingenensis var. bingenensis

Lupinus bingenensis var. subsaccatus Suksd.
