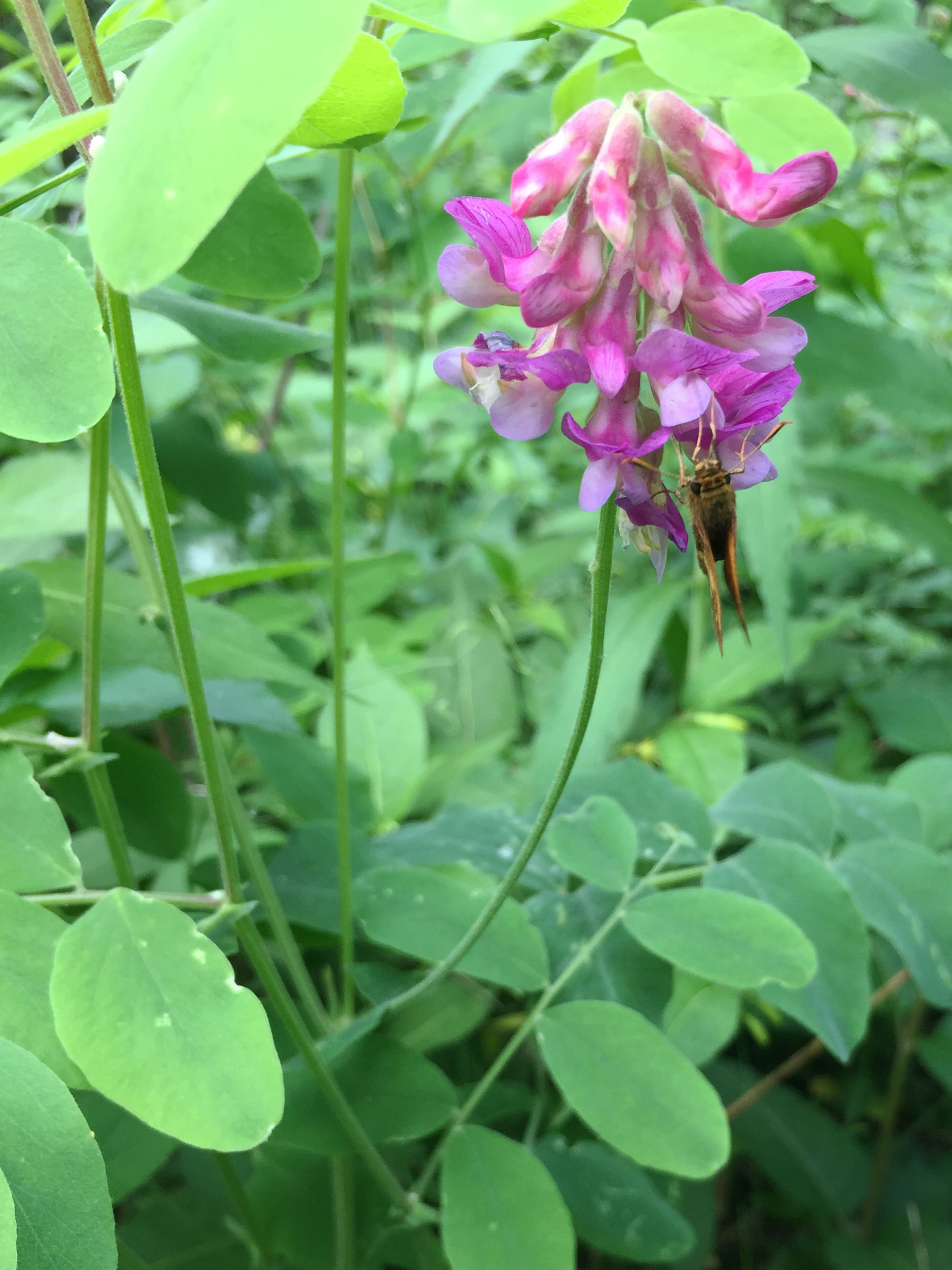

Conservation status
- Secure (NatureServe)

Scientific classification
- Kingdom: Plantae
- Clade: Tracheophytes
- Clade: Angiosperms
- Clade: Eudicots
- Clade: Rosids
- Order: Fabales
- Family: Fabaceae
- Subfamily: Faboideae
- Genus: Lathyrus
- Species: L. venosus

Binomial name
- Lathyrus venosus Muhl. ex Willd

= Lathyrus venosus =

Species of legume

Lathyrus venosus is a species of flowering plant native to North America. It is part of the botanical family Fabaceae and is commonly known as veiny pea.

== Description ==
Lathyrus venosus is a perennial vine with herbaceous stems, growing from a creeping rhizome. The stems are climbing or sprawling and measure about 0.9–1.2 metres (3–4 feet) in length. The leaves are alternate and even-pinnate with usually 8–12 leaflets, ending in a branched tendril. Each leaflet is roughly oval in shape, is untoothed, and lacks hair. The papilionaceous flowers grow from the leaf axils in clusters of 8–15. They are arranged in a raceme and are generally pink, purple, or blue. The fruit is a hairless seedpod.

== Distribution and habitat ==
Lathyrus venosus grows naturally in most of southeastern continental Canada and the eastern continental United States. (Note: Specifically: Alberta, Manitoba, Ontario, Quebec, and Saskatchewan (in Canada); Alabama, Arkansas, District of Columbia, Georgia, Illinois, Indiana, Iowa, Kentucky, Louisiana, Maryland, Michigan, Minnesota, Missouri, New Jersey, New Mexico, New York, North Carolina, North Dakota, Oklahoma, Pennsylvania, South Carolina, South Dakota, Tennessee, Texas, Virginia, West Virginia, and Wisconsin (in the USA).) It generally grows in pine and prairie woodlands, along streams, on rocky slopes and roadsides, and in sandy ground.

== Conservation status ==
The plant is globally secure, although in some parts of its range it may be at a lower status locally.

== Names ==
Common names include veiny pea, veiny vetchling, bushy vetchling forest pea, smooth veiny-pea, smooth veiny peavine, and gesse veinée (in French).
