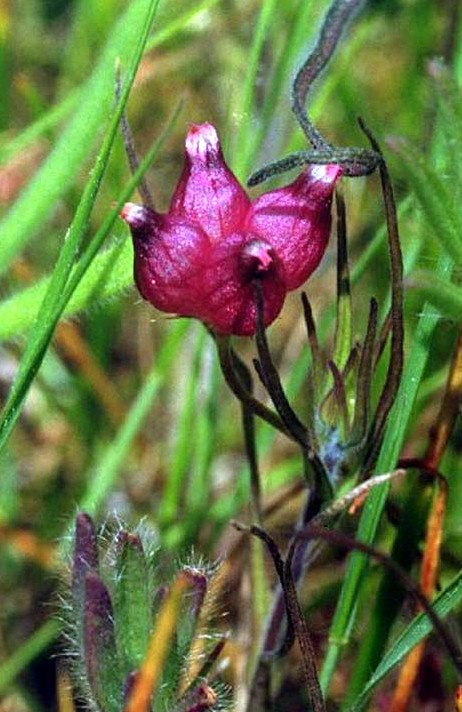

Scientific classification
- Kingdom: Plantae
- Clade: Embryophytes
- Clade: Tracheophytes
- Clade: Spermatophytes
- Clade: Angiosperms
- Clade: Eudicots
- Clade: Rosids
- Order: Fabales
- Family: Fabaceae
- Subfamily: Faboideae
- Genus: Trifolium
- Species: T. depauperatum

Binomial name
- Trifolium depauperatum Desv.

= Trifolium depauperatum =

Species of flowering plant in the bean family

Trifolium depauperatum is a species of clover known by the common names cowbag clover, poverty clover, and balloon sack clover.

== Description ==
Trifolium depauperatum is a small annual herb growing upright or decumbent in form. The leaves are made up of oval leaflets up to 2 centimeters (3/4 in) long which are smooth, toothed, lobed, or blunt-tipped. The inflorescence is a head of flowers up to 1.5 cm long. The flower has a pinkish purple white-tipped corolla up to 1 cm long. It becomes inflated as the fruit develops.

=== Subspecies ===
Trifolium depauperatum has several varieties, which can include:

- Trifolium depauperatum var. amplectens — Balloon sack clover, Pale bladder clover.
- Trifolium depauperatum var. depauperatum — Cowbag clover.
- Trifolium depauperatum var. hydrophilum
- Trifolium depauperatum var. truncatum — Dwarf sack clover.

== Distribution and habitat ==
The plant is native to western North America from British Columbia to California, as well as to western South America in Peru and Chile. It is a common plant of many types of habitat, including coastal prairie and mixed evergreen forest.
