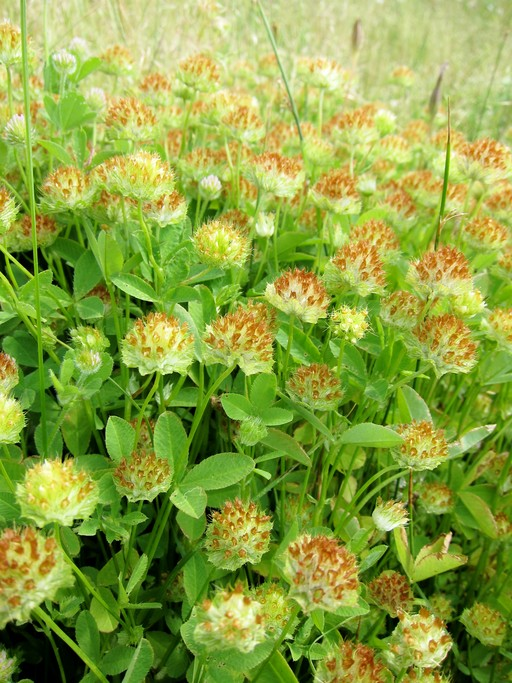

Conservation status
- Apparently Secure (NatureServe)

Scientific classification
- Kingdom: Plantae
- Clade: Tracheophytes
- Clade: Angiosperms
- Clade: Eudicots
- Clade: Rosids
- Order: Fabales
- Family: Fabaceae
- Subfamily: Faboideae
- Genus: Trifolium
- Species: T. cyathiferum

Binomial name
- Trifolium cyathiferum Lindl.

= Trifolium cyathiferum =

Species of flowering plant in the bean family

Trifolium cyathiferum is a species of clover known by the common names cup clover and bowl clover.

== Description ==
Trifolium cyathiferum is a low growing annual plant.

Blooming from May to August, the inflorescence is many flowered and bowl shaped. The flowers are white to yellow with pink tips.

== Distribution and habitat ==
This species occurs in western North America, its distribution extending from Alaska and the Yukon, through the Pacific Northwest to California, Utah, and Montana. As an example occurrence, it is found in the California Coast Ranges in such places as Ring Mountain, California, where it is found in association with tomcat clover.

It usually occurs in spring-moist valleys, chaparral, and forest habitats, below 2,500 metres (8,200 ft) in elevation.
