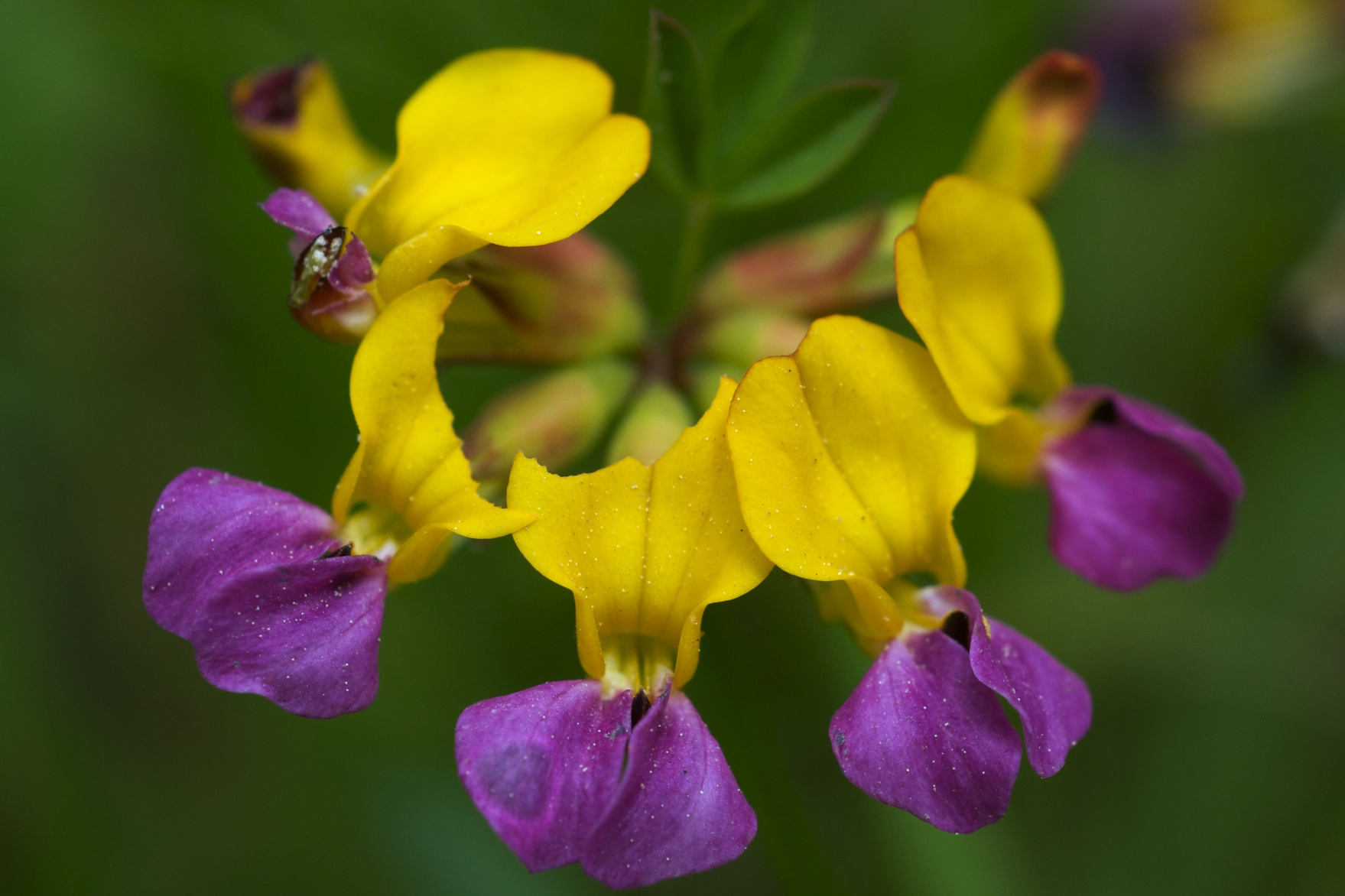

Scientific classification
- Kingdom: Plantae
- Clade: Tracheophytes
- Clade: Angiosperms
- Clade: Eudicots
- Clade: Rosids
- Order: Fabales
- Family: Fabaceae
- Subfamily: Faboideae
- Genus: Hosackia
- Species: H. gracilis

Binomial name
- Hosackia gracilis Benth.

Synonyms
- Anisolotus formosissimus (Greene) Thornber; Lotus formosissimus Greene

= Hosackia gracilis =

Species of legume

Hosackia gracilis, synonym Lotus formosissimus, is a species of legume native to western North America from British Columbia through Washington and Oregon to California. It was first described by George Bentham. It is known by the common names harlequin lotus and seaside bird's-foot trefoil. It grows in moist spots in the coastal mountains and down to the oceanside bluffs. It is a perennial herb growing upright or spreading to about 0.5 m in maximum length. It is lined with leaves each made up of a few oppositely arranged oval leaflets up to 2 cm long. The inflorescence is made up of several pealike flowers each 1 to 2 cm long. The flower has a bright yellow banner, or upper petal, and bright pink or white lower petals. The fruit is a legume pod 2 to 3 cm long.

It is believed that the caterpillars of the critically endangered lotis blue butterfly (syn. Lycaeides idas lotis, Lycaeides argyrognomon lotis, Plebejus anna lotis) feed on Hosackia gracilis on the Mendocino coast in damp coastal prairies.

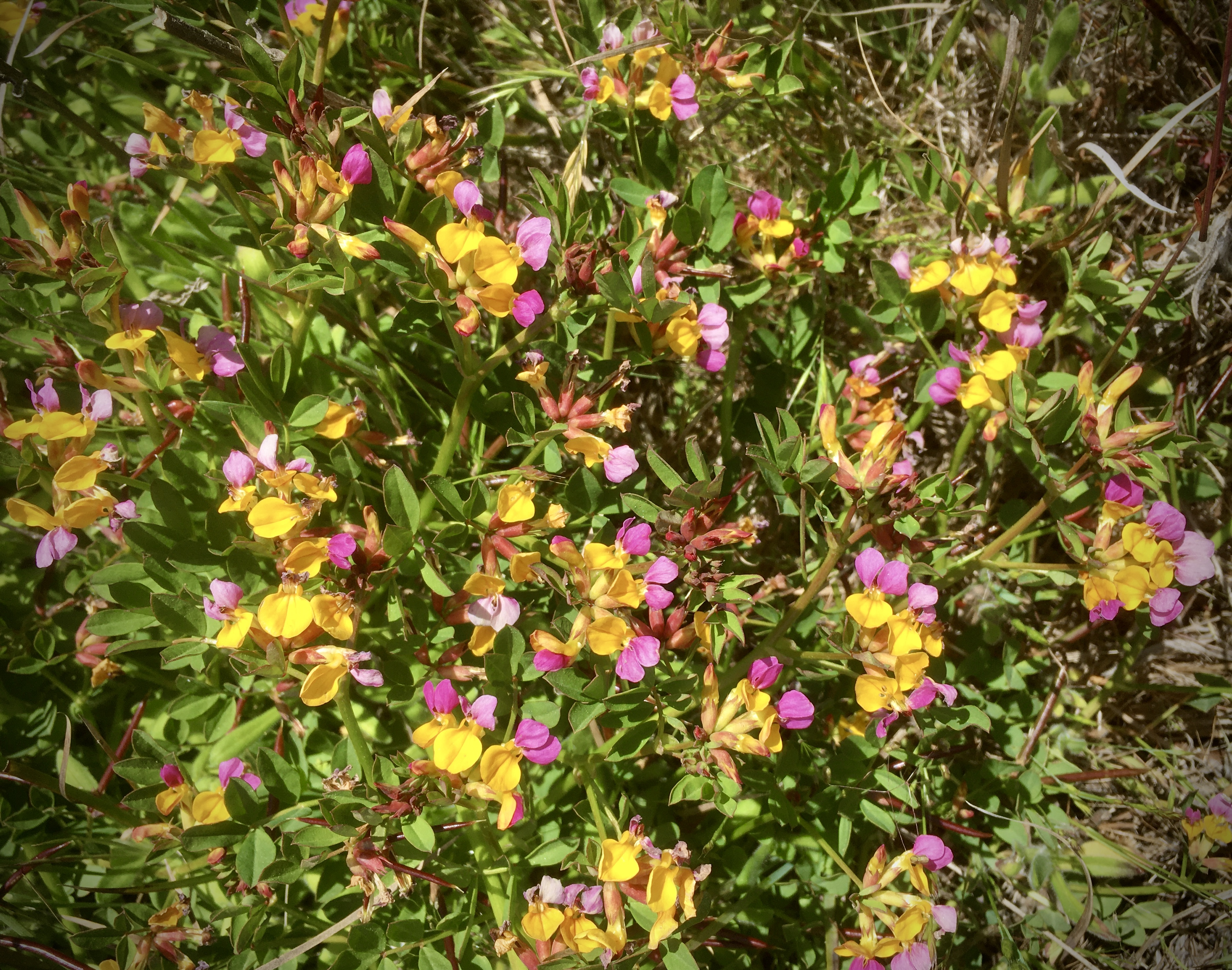
In Hearst San Simeon State Park
