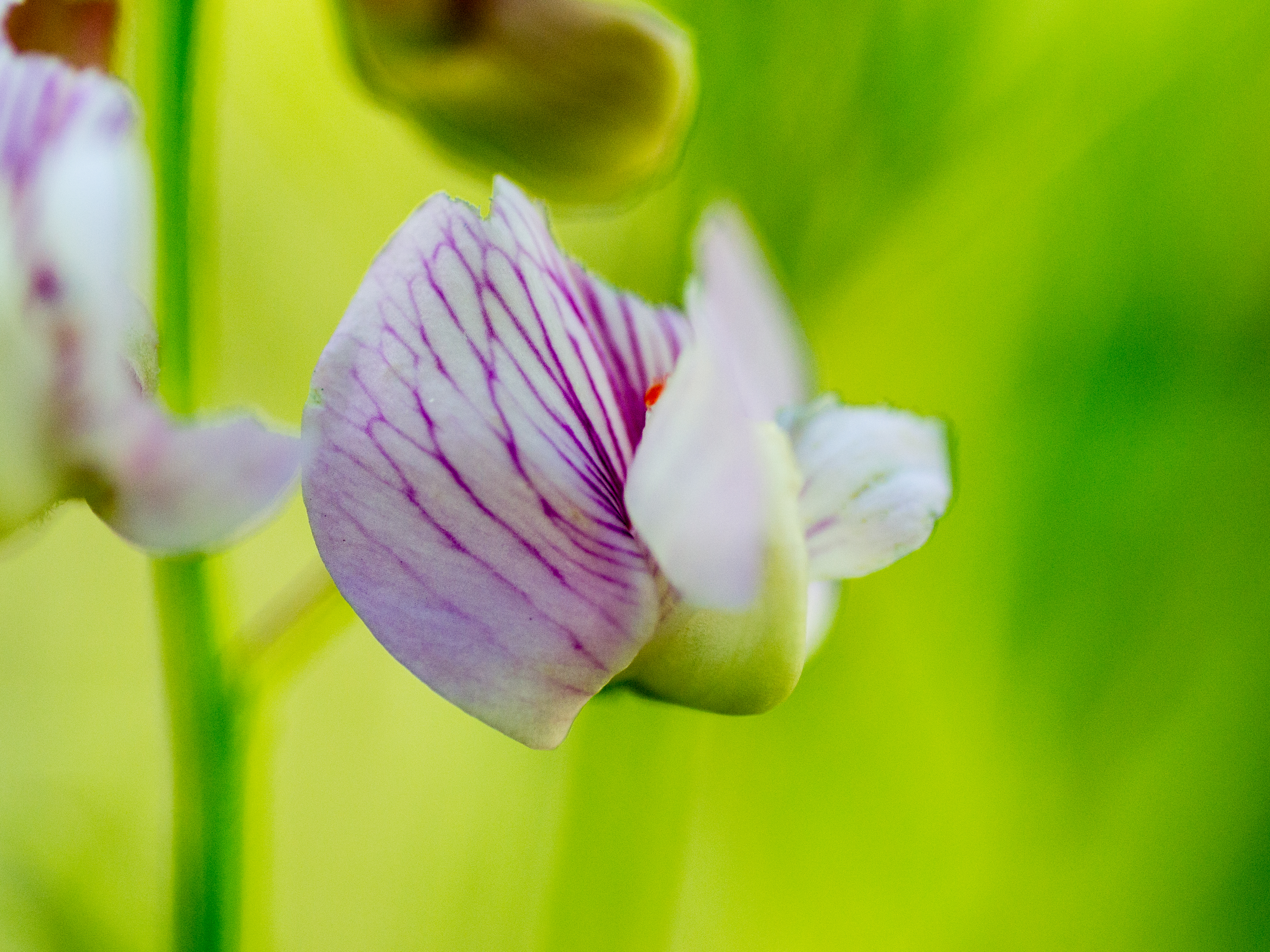

Conservation status
- Apparently Secure (NatureServe)

Scientific classification
- Kingdom: Plantae
- Clade: Tracheophytes
- Clade: Angiosperms
- Clade: Eudicots
- Clade: Rosids
- Order: Fabales
- Family: Fabaceae
- Subfamily: Faboideae
- Genus: Lathyrus
- Species: L. lanszwertii

Binomial name
- Lathyrus lanszwertii Kellogg

Varieties
- Lathyrus lanszwertii var. aridus (Piper) Jeps.; Lathyrus lanszwertii var. arizonicus (Britton) S.L.Welsh; Lathyrus lanszwertii var. bijugatus (T.G.White) Broich; Lathyrus lanszwertii var. lanszwertii; Lathyrus lanszwertii var. pallescens Barneby

Synonyms
- List: Lathyrus arizonicus Britton (1894); Lathyrus bijugatus T.G.White (1894); Lathyrus goldsteinae Eastw. (1905); Lathyrus coriaceus T.G.White (1894); Lathyrus leucanthus Rydb. (1901); Lathyrus oregonensis T.G.White (1894); Lathyrus sandbergii (T.G.White) Howell (1898)

= Lathyrus lanszwertii =

Species of plant in the pea family

Lathyrus lanszwertii is a species of sweet pea known by the common names Nevada sweet pea or peavine. It is found in western North America from California to Texas to British Columbia. It is a tender vining perennial which bears lavender, fuchsia, or white pea flowers, and pods containing inedible peas.

There is much variation among individuals of this species, and there are several distinct varieties:

- Lathyrus lanszwertii var. aridus - (Piper) Jeps.
- Lathyrus lanszwertii var. arizonicus (Britton) S.L.Welsh
- Lathyrus lanszwertii var. bijugatus (T.G.White) Broich
- Lathyrus lanszwertii var. lanszwertii
- Lathyrus lanszwertii var. pallescens Barneby
