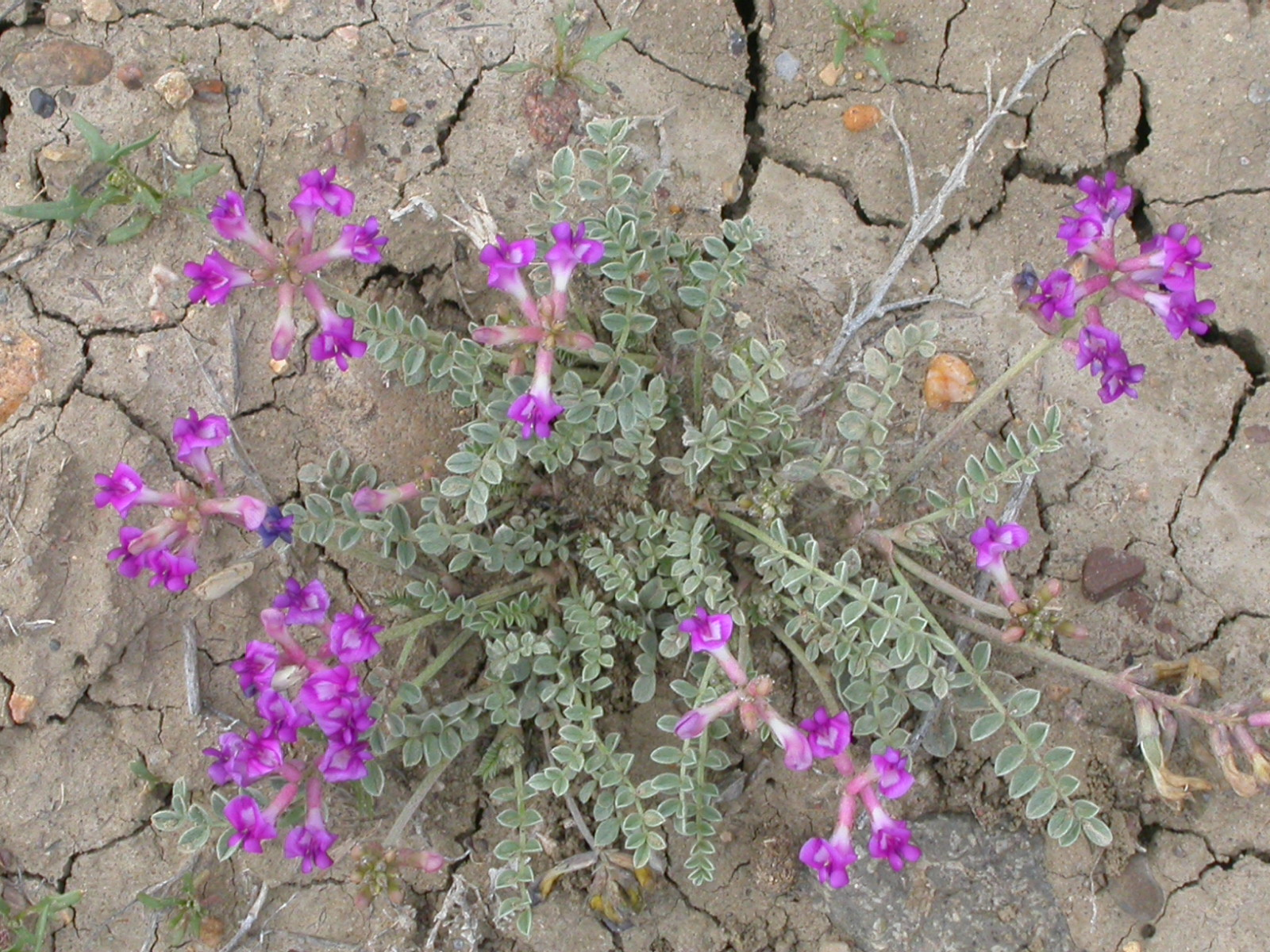

Conservation status
- Secure (NatureServe)

Scientific classification
- Kingdom: Plantae
- Clade: Tracheophytes
- Clade: Angiosperms
- Clade: Eudicots
- Clade: Rosids
- Order: Fabales
- Family: Fabaceae
- Subfamily: Faboideae
- Genus: Astragalus
- Species: A. missouriensis

Binomial name
- Astragalus missouriensis Nutt.

= Astragalus missouriensis =

Species of legume

Astragalus missouriensis is a species of flowering plant in the legume family known by the common name Missouri milkvetch. It is native to central North America, where it is common and widespread.

== Description ==
Astragalus missouriensis is a low growing, herbaceous, perennial plant. Though low growing, its stems often reach 15 centimeters in length and as much as 20 centimeters in exceptional circumstances.
