= Leucodelphinidin =

Names
- IUPAC name (2R,3S,4S)-Flavan-3,3′,4,4′,5,5′,7-heptol
- Systematic IUPAC name (2R,3S,4S)-2-(3,4,5-Trihydroxyphenyl)-2H-1-benzopyran-3,4,5,7-tetrol
- Other names leukoefdin Leucoefdin leucodelfinidin Leucoephdine; Leukoephdin

Identifiers
| CAS Number | 12764-74-8 |
| 3D model (JSmol) | Interactive image |
| ChEBI | CHEBI:6417 |
| ChemSpider | 389679 |
| KEGG | C05909 |
| PubChem CID | 440835 |
| UNII | 7Y16CK877U |
- InChI: InChI=1S/C15H14O8/c16-6-3-7(17)11-10(4-6)23-15(14(22)13(11)21)5-1-8(18)12(20)9(19)2-5/h1-4,13-22H/t13-,14-,15+/m0/s1 Key: ZEACOKJOQLAYTD-SOUVJXGZSA-N
- SMILES: C1=C(C=C(C(=C1O)O)O)C2C(C(C3=C(C=C(C=C3O2)O)O)O)O

Properties
| Chemical formula | C_{15}H_{14}O_{8} |
| Molar mass | 322.26 g/mol |
- Except where otherwise noted, data are given for materials in their standard state (at 25 °C [77 °F], 100 kPa). Infobox references

Leucodelphinidin is a colorless chemical compound related to leucoanthocyanidins. It can be found in Acacia auriculiformis, in the bark of Karada (Cleistanthus collinus) and in the kino (gum) from Eucalyptus pilularis.

Other species containing leucodelphinidin include Aesculus hippocastanum (Horse chestnut, in rind/bark/cortex), Arachis hypogaea (Earth nut in seeds), Arbutus unedo (Arbutus, in the leaf), Caesalpinia pulcherrima (Barbados pride), Ceratonia siliqua (Carob, in the fruit), Hamamelis virginiana (American witch hazel, in the leaf), Hippophae rhamnoides (Hippophae berry, in the leaf), Humulus lupulus (bine flower / blossom, in the leaf), Musa acuminata × balbisiana (Banana, in the fruit), Nelumbo nucifera (lotus, in the leaf), Phyllanthus emblica (Emblic, Indian gooseberry, in the rind/bark/cortex), Quercus alba (White oak, in the rind/bark/cortex), Quercus robur (Common oak, in the rind/bark/cortex), Rumex hymenosepalus (Arizona dock, in the root), Schinus molle (California peppertree, in the leaf) and Vicia faba (bell-bean, in the seed).

A leucodelphinidin derivative isolated from Ficus bengalensis shows hypoglycemic effects.

== Biosynthesis and metabolism ==
In part of the flavonoid biosynthesis pathway in plants, the enzyme dihydroflavonol 4-reductase converts ampelopsin to leucodelphinidin.

ampelopsin
+ NADPH
H^{+}
leucodelphinidin
+ NADP^{+}

A further reduction reaction using nicotinamide adenine dinucleotide phosphate is catalysed by leucoanthocyanidin reductase and gives (+)-gallocatechol:

leucodelphinidin
+ NADPH
H^{+}
H_{2}O
(+)-gallocatechol
+ NADP^{+}
