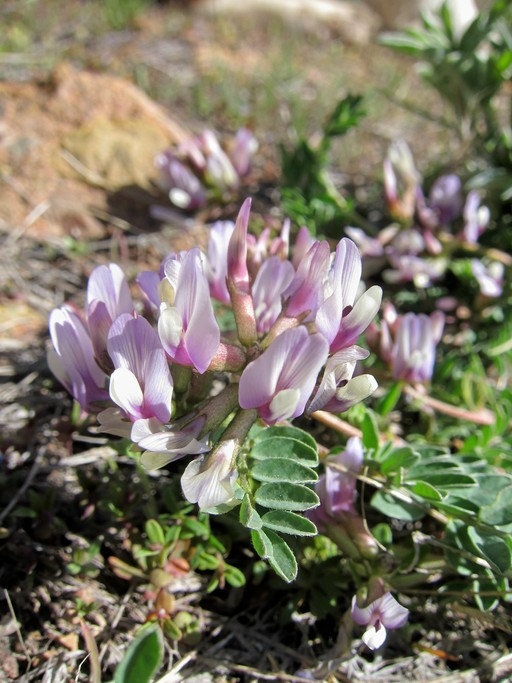

Conservation status
- Apparently Secure (NatureServe)

Scientific classification
- Kingdom: Plantae
- Clade: Embryophytes
- Clade: Tracheophytes
- Clade: Angiosperms
- Clade: Eudicots
- Clade: Rosids
- Order: Fabales
- Family: Fabaceae
- Subfamily: Faboideae
- Genus: Astragalus
- Species: A. lentiginosus
- Variety: A. l. var. iodanthus

Trinomial name
- Astragalus lentiginosus var. iodanthus (S.Watson) J.A.Alexander

Synonyms
- Astragalus adsurgens Torr., nom. illeg.; Astragalus iodanthus var. diaphanoides Barneby; Astragalus iodanthus var. typicus Barneby, not validly publ.; Astragalus iodanthus var. vipereus Barneby; Astragalus iodanthus S.Watson; Tragacantha iodantha (S.Watson) Kuntze; Xylophacos iodanthus (S.Watson) Rydb.

= Astragalus lentiginosus var. iodanthus =

Species of legume

Astragalus lentiginosus var. iodanthus, synonym Astragalus iodanthus, is a variety of Astragalus lentiginosus, a flowering plant in the legume family, Fabaceae. It is known by the common names Humboldt River milkvetch and violet milkvetch. It is native to the western United States, where its range includes California, Idaho, Nevada, Oregon, and Utah. It grows on hills and in valleys in barren sandy and volcanic soils in habitat such as sagebrush.

This perennial herb produces several prostrate stems up to 40 centimeters long. The compound leaves are made up of 9 to 21 rounded or teardrop-shaped leaflets each up to 1.8 centimeters long. The inflorescence is a raceme of flowers in shades of reddish purple or white to cream with a purple tip on the keel petal. There are up to 25 flowers in a raceme, and they are crowded when first blooming but spread out over time. The fruit is a legume pod up to 4 centimeters long, becoming dark, mottled, and papery to leathery with age.
