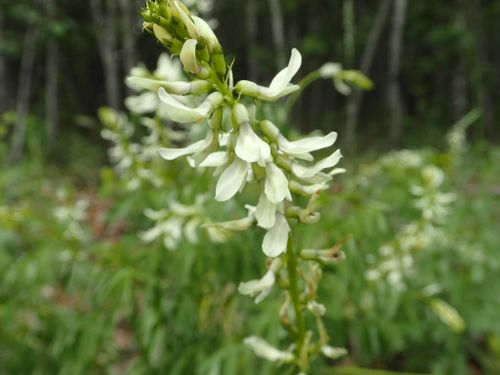

Conservation status
- Least Concern (IUCN 3.1)

Scientific classification
- Kingdom: Plantae
- Clade: Tracheophytes
- Clade: Angiosperms
- Clade: Eudicots
- Clade: Rosids
- Order: Fabales
- Family: Fabaceae
- Subfamily: Faboideae
- Genus: Astragalus
- Species: A. williamsii

Binomial name
- Astragalus williamsii Britton & Rydb.

Synonyms
- Astragalus gormani W.Wight ex M.E.Jones; Atelophragma williamsii (Britton & Rydb.) Rydb.

= Astragalus williamsii =

Species of flowering plant

Astragalus williamsii, commonly known as Williams' milk-vetch, is a species of flowering plant in the family Fabaceae. It is a perennial herb with yellow petals.

The species is native to Alaska and the Canadian Yukon, and faces no major conservation threats.

== Distribution ==
Astragalus williamsii is native to southern Alaska and Canada's Yukon territory. It is found in forests, grasslands, and inland wetlands, at elevations from 600–1,800 metres (2,000–5,900 ft).

The species grows in sand or gravel near the banks of creeks, and near aspen trees in open woodlands. It has been found growing in podzol.

The type specimen was collected near the Big Salmon River in 1899. The species was described in 1900.

== Description ==
Astragalus williamsii is a perennial herb.

The stem is 20–40 centimetres (7.9–15.7 in) high, hairless, and light green or straw-coloured. The leaves are 5–10 centimetres (2.0–3.9 in) long. The plant has nine to eleven leaflets, which are 1.5–3.5 centimetres (0.59–1.38 in) long, and 0.4–0.8 centimetres (0.16–0.31 in) wide.

The petals are yellow, with purplish ridges. The calyx is black, hairy, and grows around 3 millimetres (0.12 in) long. The flower stalk is 1–2 millimetres (0.039–0.079 in) long.

The fruit is 1–1.4 centimetres (0.39–0.55 in) long, and 0.4 centimetres (0.16 in) wide. Each fruit has around four brownish-black seeds.

== Conservation ==
Astragalus williamsii is classified as of Least Concern by the IUCN. It is common in its range, and faces no threats. NatureServe classifies the species as Apparently Secure in Canada, and Vulnerable in its Alaskan range.
