= Lathyrus lanszwertii var. bijugatus =

Conservation status
- Apparently Secure (NatureServe)

Scientific classification
- Kingdom: Plantae
- Clade: Tracheophytes
- Clade: Angiosperms
- Clade: Eudicots
- Clade: Rosids
- Order: Fabales
- Family: Fabaceae
- Subfamily: Faboideae
- Genus: Lathyrus
- Species: L. lanszwertii
- Variety: L. l. var. bijugatus

Trinomial name
- Lathyrus lanszwertii var. bijugatus (T.G.White) Broich

Synonyms
- Lathyrus bijugatus T.G.White; Lathyrus bijugatus var. sandbergii T.G.White; Lathyrus lanszwertii var. sandbergii (T.G.White) Broich; Lathyrus sandbergii (T.G.White) Howell

Species of legume

Lathyrus lanszwertii var. bijugatus is a variety of flowering plant in the family Fabaceae known by the common names drypark pea, pinewoods sweetpea, and Latah tule-pea. It is native to western North America from British Columbia to Oregon to Montana, and possibly as far south as California.

This plant is a perennial herb growing from a rhizome and reaching an erect height of 30 centimeters. Each leaf is made up of two to four leaflets up to 15 centimeters long. The leaves have bristles at the tips instead of tendrils. The flowers are pink to light blue and roughly a centimeter long. The fruit is a flat legume pod up to 4 centimeters long containing up to 12 seeds. It reproduces sexually by seed and vegetatively. It grows in forests. The plant is poisonous.
