= Aphanorrhegma =

Scientific classification
- Kingdom: Plantae
- Division: Bryophyta
- Class: Bryopsida
- Order: Funariales
- Family: Funariaceae
- Genus: Aphanorrhegma; Sull. ex A.Gray
- Species: A. serratum

Binomial name
- Aphanorrhegma serratum (Wilson & Hooker) Sull. ex A.Gray

Genus of mosses

Aphanorrhegma is a genus of moss in the family Funariaceae. It contains the single species Aphanorrhegma serratum distributed in eastern North America.
