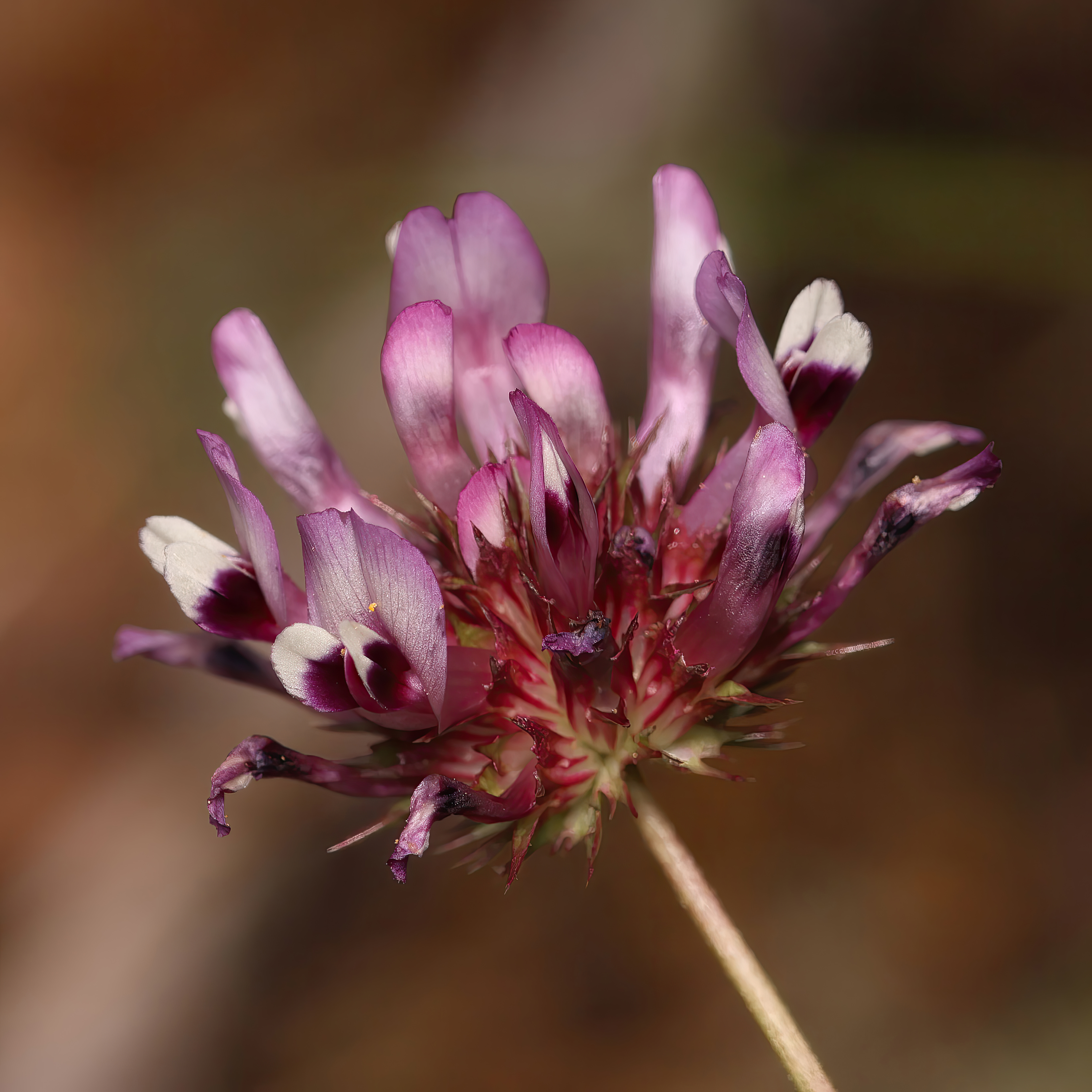

Scientific classification
- Kingdom: Plantae
- Clade: Tracheophytes
- Clade: Angiosperms
- Clade: Eudicots
- Clade: Rosids
- Order: Fabales
- Family: Fabaceae
- Subfamily: Faboideae
- Genus: Trifolium
- Species: T. wildenovii

Binomial name
- Trifolium wildenovii Spreng.

= Trifolium willdenovii =

Species of legume

Trifolium willdenovii, the tomcat clover, is a species of plant in the pea family Fabaceae. This species occurs in the western part of North America. As an example occurrence, it is found in the California Coast Ranges in such places as Ring Mountain, California, where it is found in association with cup clover.
