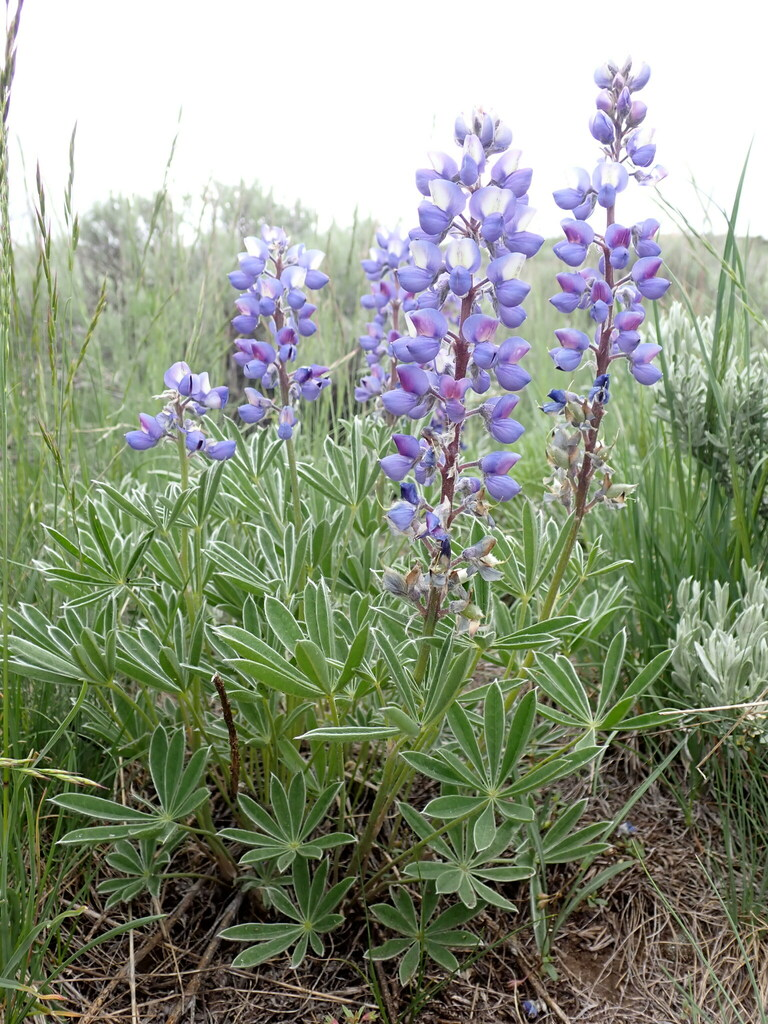

Conservation status
- Secure (NatureServe)

Scientific classification
- Kingdom: Plantae
- Clade: Tracheophytes
- Clade: Angiosperms
- Clade: Eudicots
- Clade: Rosids
- Order: Fabales
- Family: Fabaceae
- Subfamily: Faboideae
- Genus: Lupinus
- Species: L. wyethii

Binomial name
- Lupinus wyethii S. Wats.

= Lupinus wyethii =

Plant species in the pea family

Lupinus wyethii, also known as Wyeth's lupine, is a species of lupine native to British Columbia, Alberta, Washington, Idaho, Montana, Oregon, Colorado, Utah, and Wyoming.

The bloom season for the plant is May-July. The bloom colors are blue and violet.

Its pollinators include the species of Bombus vagans, Bombus bifarius, and other species of bee.
