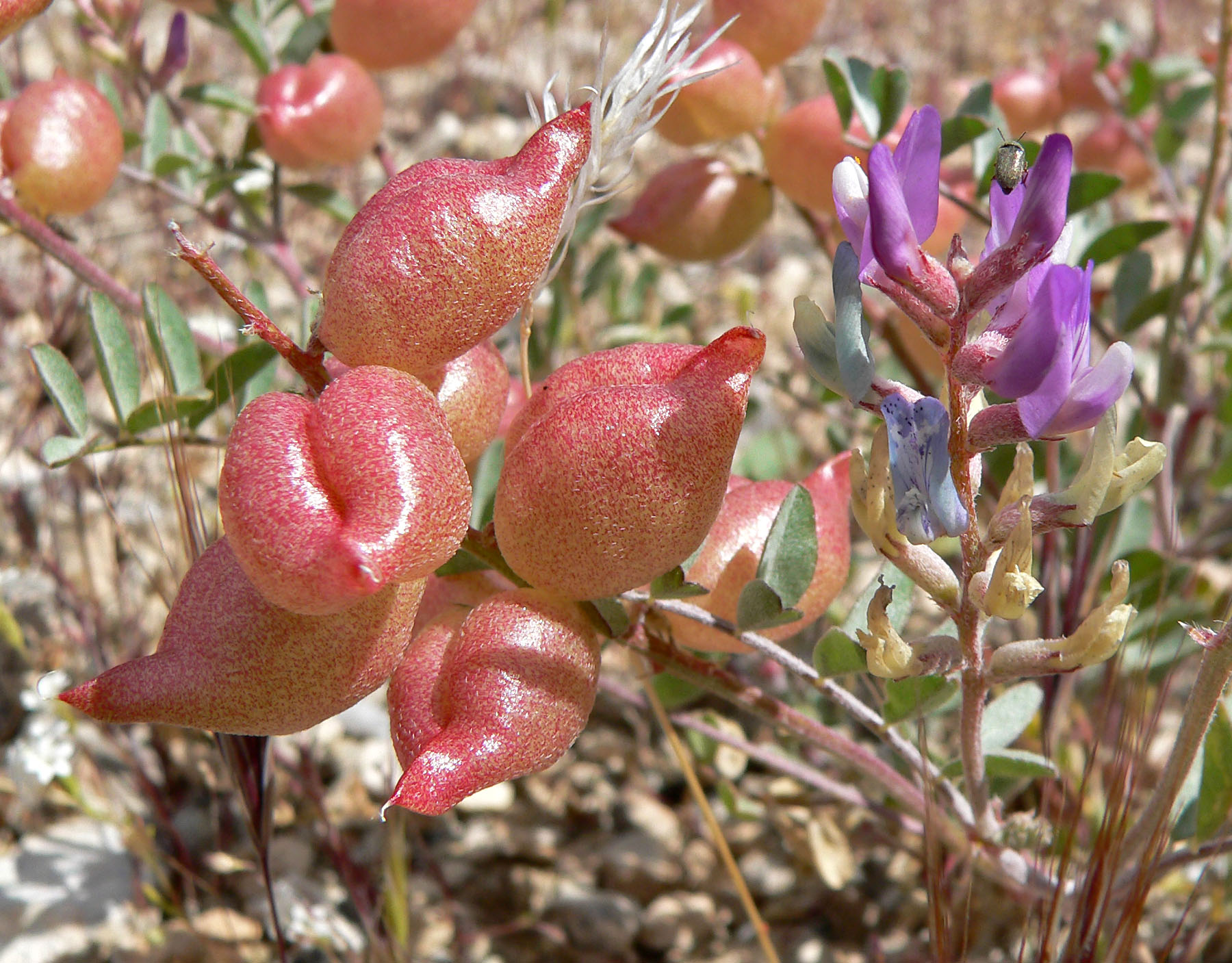

Conservation status
- Secure (NatureServe)

Scientific classification
- Kingdom: Plantae
- Clade: Tracheophytes
- Clade: Angiosperms
- Clade: Eudicots
- Clade: Rosids
- Order: Fabales
- Family: Fabaceae
- Subfamily: Faboideae
- Genus: Astragalus
- Species: A. lentiginosus

Binomial name
- Astragalus lentiginosus Douglas ex Hook. (1831)

Synonyms
- List: Astragalus adsurgens Torr. (1852); Astragalus agninus Jeps. (1925); Astragalus albifolius (M.E.Jones) Abrams (1944); Astragalus amplexus Payson (1915); Astragalus araneosus E.Sheld. (1894); Astragalus arthu-schottii A.Gray (1864); Astragalus bryantii Barneby (1944); Astragalus coulteri Benth. (1849); Astragalus diphysus A.Gray (1849); Astragalus eremicus E.Sheld. (1893); Astragalus fremontii A.Gray ex Torr. (1857); Astragalus heliophilus (Rydb.) Tidestr. (1925); Astragalus idriensis (M.E.Jones) Abrams (1944); Astragalus ineptus A.Gray (1865); Astragalus iodanthus S.Watson (1871); Astragalus kernensis Jeps. (1925); Astragalus latus (M.E.Jones) M.E.Jones (1893); Astragalus macdougalii E.Sheld. (1894); Astragalus merrillii (Rydb.) Tidestr. (1937); Astragalus nigricalycis (M.E.Jones) Abrams (1944); Astragalus palans M.E.Jones (1893); Astragalus pseudiodanthus Barneby (1942); Astragalus salinus Howell (1893); Astragalus sierrae (M.E.Jones) Tidestr. (1937); Astragalus tehachapiensis (Rydb.) Tidestr. (1937); Astragalus ursinus A.Gray (1878); Astragalus wilsonii Greene (1897); Astragalus yuccanus (M.E.Jones) Tidestr. (1935); Cystium agninum (Jeps.) Rydb. (1929); Cystium albifolium (M.E.Jones) Rydb. (1929); Cystium araneosum (E.Sheld.) Rydb. (1913); Cystium arthu-schottii (A.Gray) Rydb. (1929); Cystium cornutum Rydb. (1929); Cystium coulteri (Benth.) Rydb. (1913); Cystium diphysum (A.Gray) Rydb. (1905); Cystium eremicum (E.Sheld.) Rydb. (1929); Cystium floribundum (A.Gray) Rydb. (1929); Cystium fremontii (A.Gray ex Torr.) Rydb. (1929); Cystium griseolum Rydb. (1929); Cystium heliophilum Rydb. (1914); Cystium idriense (M.E.Jones) Rydb. (1929); Cystium ineptum (A.Gray) Rydb. 1906); Cystium kennedyi Rydb. (1929); Cystium kernense (Jeps.) Rydb. (1929); Cystium latum (M.E.Jones) Rydb. (1929); Cystium lentiginosum (Douglas ex Hook.) Rydb. (1913); Cystium macdougalii (E.Sheld.) Rydb. (1929); Cystium macrolobum Rydb. (1929); Cystium merrillii Rydb. (1929); Cystium nigricalyce (M.E.Jones) Rydb. (1929); Cystium ormsbyense Rydb. (1929); Cystium pardalotum Rydb. (1929); Cystium platyphyllidium Rydb. (1929); Cystium salinum (Howell) Rydb. (1917); Cystium scorpionis (M.E.Jones) Rydb. (1929); Cystium sesquimetrale Rydb. (1929); Cystium sierrae (M.E.Jones) Rydb. (1929); Cystium stramineum Rydb. (1929); Cystium tehatchapiense Rydb. (1929); Cystium vulpinum Rydb. (1929); Cystium yuccanum (M.E.Jones) Rydb. (1929); Hamosa amplexa Rydb. (1917); Phaca inepta (A.Gray) Rydb. (1900); Phaca lentiginosa (Douglas ex Hook.) Piper (1906); Tium amplexum (Payson) Rydb. (1929); Tium palans (M.E.Jones) Rydb. (1929); Tium ursinum (A.Gray) Rydb. (1929); Tium wilsonii (Greene) Rydb. (1929); Tragacantha coulteri (Benth.) Kuntze (1891); Tragacantha diphysa (A.Gray) Kuntze (1891); Tragacantha iodantha (S.Watson) Kuntze (1891); Tragacantha lentiginosa (Douglas ex Hook.) Kuntze (1891); Xylophacos iodanthus (S.Watson) Rydb. (1925)

= Astragalus lentiginosus =

Species of flowering plant in the milkvetch genus

Astragalus lentiginosus is a species of legume native to western North America where it grows in a range of habitats. Common names include spotted locoweed and freckled milkvetch. There are a great number of wild varieties. The flower and the fruit of an individual plant are generally needed to identify the specific variety.

== Distribution ==
As a species, Astragalus lentiginosus is distributed throughout the Great Basin of North America, west from the Rocky Mountains to the California Coast Ranges, south to Mexico, and north to British Columbia. Varieties are largely limited to marginal habitats such as disturbed sites in the arid regions of the continent. The group also contains a number of edaphic specialists which occur at desert seeps, which frequently exhibit high levels of calcium carbonate.

== Description ==
Astragalus lentiginosus is a perennial or occasionally annual herb with leaves up to 15 centimetres (5.9 inches) long divided into many pairs of small leaflets. The plant is prostrate to erect in form and quite woolly to nearly hairless. The inflorescence holds up to 50 pea-like flowers which may be purplish or whitish or a mix of both. A unifying character among most of the varieties is an inflated, beaked legume pod with a groove along the side. The pod dries to a papery texture and dehisces starting at the beak to release the seeds. The epithet lentiginosus refers to the red mottling commonly found on the pods which resemble freckles. The bloom period is between the months of March, April, and May.

== Taxonomy ==
Many of what are known as varieties of Astragalus lentiginosus were originally described as individual species. Botanist Marcus E. Jones was the first to recognize the similarities among these taxa and arranged them as varieties of one species. Per Axel Rydberg employed a very different species concept stating that he did not believe in infrataxa. This resulted in his raising Jones's varieties to species in the genera Cystium and Tium. A notable novelty of Rydberg's treatment is the concept of sections which have been maintained in the keys of subsequent treatments, even if this was not explicitly stated.

Subsequent treatments include Barneby, Isely, and Welsh. Each of these treatments are slightly different, containing between 36 and 42 taxa. Recent molecular work seems to suggest a genetic component to the varieties.

=== Varieties ===
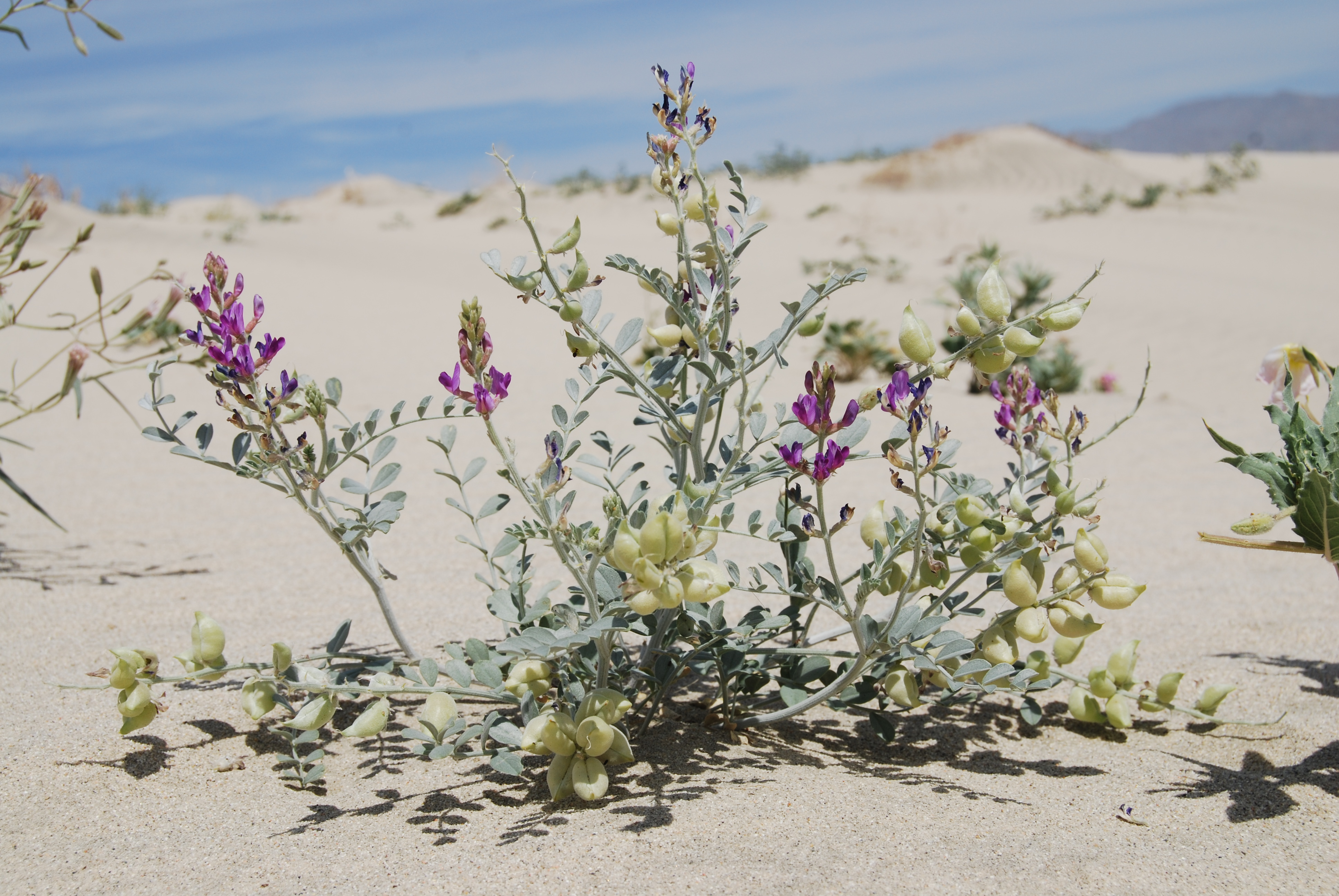
A. l. var. coachellae

As of April 2023, Plants of the World Online accepted 40 varieties:

- A. l. var. albifolius M.E.Jones
- A. l. var. ambiguus Barneby
- A. l. var. antonius Barneby
- A. l. var. australis Barneby
- A. l. var. borreganus M.E.Jones
- A. l. var. bryantii (Barneby) J.A.Alexander
- A. l. var. chartaceus M.E.Jones
- A. l. var. coachellae Barneby
- A. l. var. diphysus (A.Gray) M.E.Jones
- A. l. var. floribundus Gray
- A. l. var. fremontii (A.Gray) S.Watson
- A. l. var. higginsii S.L.Welsh
- A. l. var. idriensis M.E.Jones
- A. l. var. ineptus (A.Gray) M.E.Jones
- A. l. var. iodanthus (S.Watson) J.A.Alexander
- A. l. var. kennedyi (Rydb.) Barneby
- A. l. var. kernensis (Jeps.) Barneby
- A. l. var. latus (M.E.Jones) M.E.Jones
- A. l. var. lentiginosus Barneby
- A. l. var. maricopae Barneby
- A. l. var. micans Barneby
- A. l. var. multiracemosus S.L.Welsh & N.D.Atwood
- A. l. var. negundo S.L.Welsh & N.D.Atwood
- A. l. var. nigricalycis M.E.Jones
- A. l. var. oropedii Barneby
- A. l. var. palans (M.E.Jones) M.E.Jones
- A. l. var. piscinensis Barneby
- A. l. var. pohlii S.L.Welsh & Barneby
- A. l. var. pseudiodanthus (Barneby) J.A.Alexander
- A. l. var. salinus (Howell) Barneby
- A. l. var. scorpionis M.E.Jones
- A. l. var. semotus Jeps.
- A. l. var. sesquimetralis (Rydb.) Barneby
- A. l. var. sierrae M.E.Jones
- A. l. var. stramineus (Rydb.) Barneby
- A. l. var. trumbullensis S.L.Welsh & N.D.Atwood
- A. l. var. variabilis Barneby
- A. l. var. vitreus Barneby
- A. l. var. wilsonii (Greene) Barneby
- A. l. var. yuccanus M.E.Jones

== Conservation ==
Two rare varieties endemic to California are federally listed under the Endangered Species Act; var. coachellae, the Coachella Valley milk vetch, is endangered and var. piscinensis, the Fish Slough milk-vetch, is threatened.

== Cultivation ==
Astragalus lentiginosus is currently not cultivated commercially. Propagation from seed requires scarification of the seed coat in order for the embryo to absorb water.

== Uses ==
The Zuni people eat the pods of the diphysus variety fresh, boiled, or salted. They are also dried and stored for winter use.

== See also ==
- Locoweed
