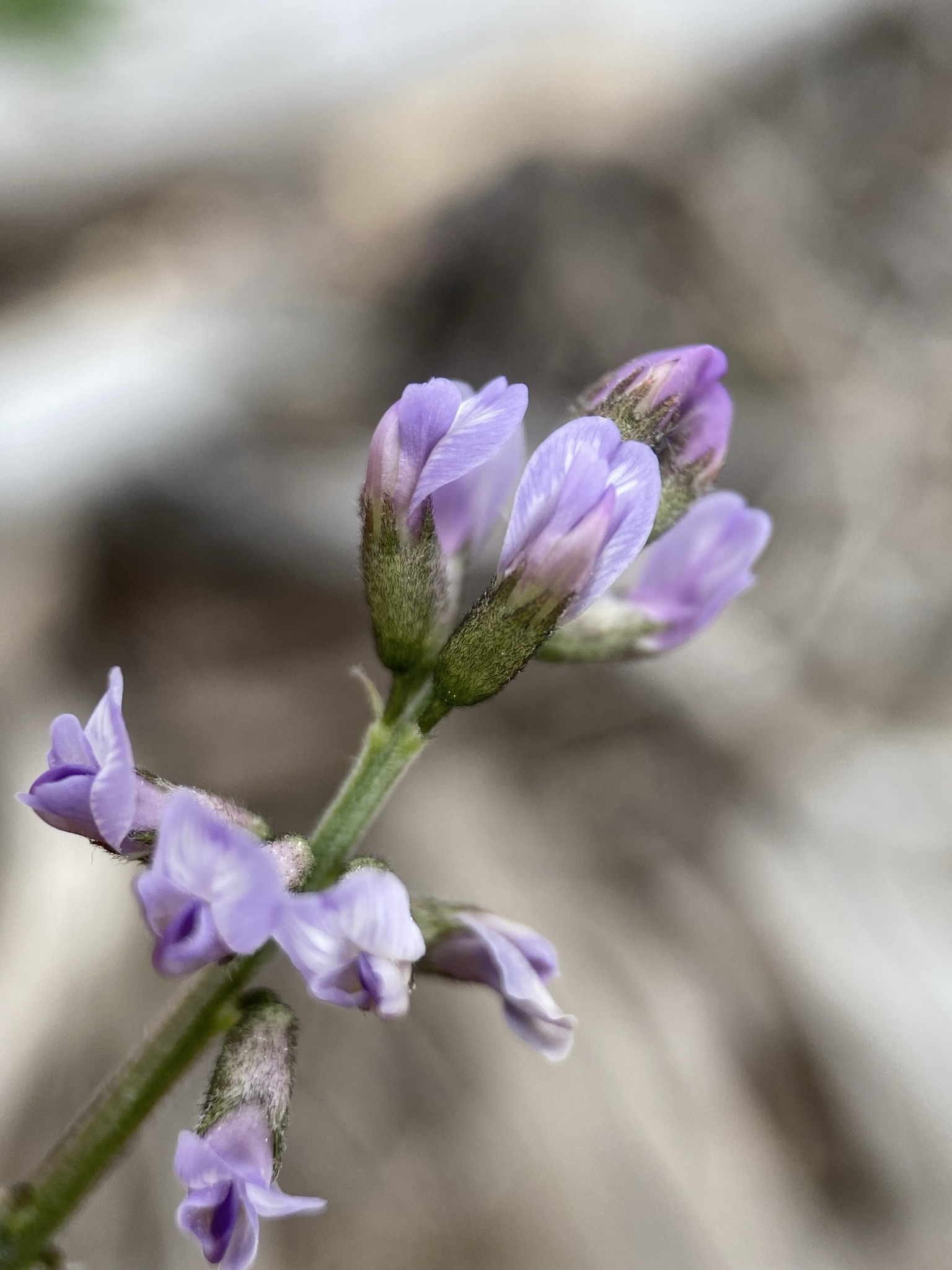

Scientific classification
- Kingdom: Plantae
- Clade: Tracheophytes
- Clade: Angiosperms
- Clade: Eudicots
- Clade: Rosids
- Order: Fabales
- Family: Fabaceae
- Subfamily: Faboideae
- Genus: Astragalus
- Species: A. eucosmus

Binomial name
- Astragalus eucosmus B.L.Rob

= Astragalus eucosmus =

Species of plant

Astragalus eucosmus, commonly known as elegant milkvetch or pretty milkvetch, is a species of milkvetch in the legume family.

== Distribution ==
Astragalus eucosmus is found in a continuous distribution across almost every Canadian province and into the Rocky Mountains of the western United States.

== Description ==
Related to its widespread distribution, elegant milkvetch varies phenotypically based on the elevation it grows at; at higher elevations, it can appear stunted.
