= Locoweed (disambiguation) =

Locoweed (also loco-weed, loco weed, and capitalizations and plurals thereof) may refer to:

Plants

- Species in the genera Astragalus and Oxytropis, collectively
- Species in the genera Astragalus and Oxytropis, that cause locoism (locoweed disease) in livestock
- Species with "locoweed" (etc.) in a common name, including:
- Astragalus alpinus, mountain locoweed
- Astragalus austiniae, ball-flowered locoweed
- Astragalus canadensis, Canada locoweed
- Astragalus coccineus, scarlet locoweed
- Astragalus didymocarpus, white dwarf locoweed
- Astragalus gambelianus, dwarf locoweed
- Astragalus holmgreniorum, Holmgren locoweed
- Astragalus lentiginosus, mottled locoweed, speckled locoweed, spotted locoweed
- Astragalus mollissimus, woolly locoweed, stemmed locoweed
- Astragalus oxyphysus, Diablo locoweed
- Astragalus pomonensis, Pomona locoweed
- Astragalus purshii, woolly-pod locoweed
- Astragalus speirocarpus, coilpod locoweed
- Astragalus trichopodus, coast locoweed, Southern California locoweed
- Astragalus whitneyii, Whitney's locoweed
- Cannabis, loco weed, when used as a recreational drug
- Datura stramonium, loco weed, when used as a hallucinogen
- Oxytropis arctica, arctic locoweed
- Oxytropis besseyi, Bessey's locoweed
- Oxytropis borealis, boreal locoweed
- Oxytropis campestris, Fassett's locoweed, field locoweed, northern yellow locoweed
- Oxytropis deflexa, nodding locoweed, pendant-pod locoweed
- Oxytropis huddelsonii, Huddelson's locoweed
- Oxytropis jordalii, Jordal's locoweed
- Oxytropis kobukensis, Kobuk locoweed
- Oxytropis kokrinensis, Kokrines locoweed
- Oxytropis lagopus, hare-foot locoweed
- Oxytropis lambertii, Colorado locoweed, Lambert locoweed, locoweed, purple locoweed, stemless locoweed, woolly locoweed
- Oxytropis maydelliana, Maydell's locoweed

- Oxytropis mertensiana, Mertens' locoweed

- Oxytropis monticola, late yellow locoweed, yellow-flower locoweed
- Oxytropis multiceps, southwestern locoweed
- Oxytropis nana, Wyoming locoweed
- Oxytropis nigrescens, black(ish) locoweed
- Oxytropis oreophila, mountain locoweed
- Oxytropis parryi, Parry's locoweed
- Oxytropis podocarpa, stalked-pod locoweed
- Oxytropis riparia, Ruby Valley locoweed
- Oxytropis scammaniana, Scamman's locoweed
- Oxytropis sericea, early yellow locoweed, locoweed, Rocky Mountain locoweed, silky locoweed, white locoweed, white point locoweed
- Oxytropis splendens, showy locoweed, whorled locoweed
- Oxytropis viscida, sticky locoweed

Music

- Loco Weed, Mel Tillis song
