= List of Oxytropis species =

List of plant species

The following species in the flowering plant genus Oxytropis, one of the genera called the locoweeds, are accepted by Plants of the World Online. Although monophyletic, this genus has undergone such rapid, "explosive" evolutionary radiation that conventional molecular methods will not be able to elucidate its infrageneric relationships.

- Oxytropis acanthacea Jurtzev
- Oxytropis aciphylla Ledeb.
- Oxytropis adamsiana (Trautv.) Jurtzev
- Oxytropis adenophylla Popov
- Oxytropis admiranda Vassilcz.
- Oxytropis adscendens Gontsch.
- Oxytropis aellenii Vassilcz.
- Oxytropis afghanica Rech.f. & Köie
- Oxytropis ajanensis (Regel & Tiling) Bunge
- Oxytropis albana Steven
- Oxytropis alberti-regelii Vassilcz.
- Oxytropis albiflora Bunge
- Oxytropis albovillosa B.Fedtsch.
- Oxytropis alii Vassilcz.
- Oxytropis almaatensis Bajtenov
- Oxytropis alpestris Schischk.
- Oxytropis alpicola Turcz.
- Oxytropis alpina Bunge
- Oxytropis altaica (Pall.) Pers.
- Oxytropis ambigua (Pall.) DC.
- Oxytropis amethystea Arv.-Touv.
- Oxytropis ammophila Turcz.
- Oxytropis ampullata (Pall.) Pers.
- Oxytropis anaulgensis Pavlov
- Oxytropis andersii Vassilcz.
- Oxytropis anertii Nakai
- Oxytropis anyemaqensis Y.H.Wu
- Oxytropis approximata Less.
- Oxytropis arassanica Gontsch.
- Oxytropis arbaevae Vassilcz.
- Oxytropis arctica R.Br.
- Oxytropis arenae-ripariae Vassilcz.
- Oxytropis argentata (Pall.) Pers.
- Oxytropis argyroleuca Bornm.
- Oxytropis armeniaca Sosn. ex Mulk.
- Oxytropis arystangalievii Bajtenov
- Oxytropis aspera Gontsch.
- Oxytropis assiensis Vassilcz.
- Oxytropis asterocarpa Vassilcz.
- Oxytropis astragaloides Boriss.
- Oxytropis atbaschi Saposhn.
- Oxytropis aucheri Boiss.
- Oxytropis aulieatensis Vved.
- Oxytropis aurea Vassilcz.
- Oxytropis auriculata C.W.Chang
- Oxytropis austrosachalinensis Vassilcz. ex N.S.Pavlova
- Oxytropis avis Saposhn.
- Oxytropis azerbaijanica Podlech
- Oxytropis babatagi Abdusal.
- Oxytropis baburi Vassilcz.
- Oxytropis baicalia (Pall.) Pers.
- Oxytropis baissunensis Vassilcz.
- Oxytropis bajtulinii Kotukhov
- Oxytropis bakhtiarica Maassoumi
- Oxytropis baldshuanica B.Fedtsch.
- Oxytropis bargusinensis Peschkova
- Oxytropis barkolensis X.Y.Zhu, H.Ohashi & Y.B.Deng
- Oxytropis barkultagi Grubov & Vassilcz.
- Oxytropis barunensis Y.H.Wu
- Oxytropis baschkiriensis Knjaz.
- Oxytropis baxoiensis P.C.Li
- Oxytropis bella B.Fedtsch. ex O.Fedtsch.
- Oxytropis bellii (Britton ex Macoun) Palib.
- Oxytropis beringensis Jurtzev
- Oxytropis besseyi (Rydb.) Blank.
- Oxytropis bicolor Bunge
- Oxytropis bicornis Vassilcz.
- Oxytropis biflora P.C.Li
- Oxytropis biloba Saposhn.
- Oxytropis binaludensis Vassilcz.
- Oxytropis birirensis Ali
- Oxytropis bobrovii B.Fedtsch.
- Oxytropis bogdoschanica Jurtzev
- Oxytropis boguschi B.Fedtsch.
- Oxytropis borealis DC.
- Oxytropis bosculensis Golosk.
- Oxytropis brachycarpa Vassilcz.
- Oxytropis bracteata Basil.
- Oxytropis bracteolata Vassilcz.
- Oxytropis brevicaulis Ledeb.
- Oxytropis brevipedunculata P.C.Li
- Oxytropis bryophila (Greene) Jurtzev
- Oxytropis bungei Kom.
- Oxytropis burchan-buddae Grubov & Vassilcz.
- Oxytropis burhanbudaica Y.H.Wu
- Oxytropis cabulica (Boiss.) Boiss.
- Oxytropis cachemiriana Cambess.
- Oxytropis caespitosa (Pall.) Pers.
- Oxytropis caespitosula Gontsch.
- Oxytropis calcareorum N.S.Pavlova
- Oxytropis callophylla Vassilcz.
- Oxytropis calva Malyschev
- Oxytropis campanulata Vassilcz.
- Oxytropis campestris (L.) DC.
- Oxytropis cana Bunge
- Oxytropis candicans (Pall.) DC.
- Oxytropis candolleorum Vassilcz.
- Oxytropis canopatula Vassilcz.
- Oxytropis capusii Franch.
- Oxytropis carpatica R.Uechtr.
- Oxytropis caudiciramosa Vassilcz.
- Oxytropis chakassiensis Polozhij
- Oxytropis chantengriensis Vassilcz.
- Oxytropis charkeviczii Vyschin
- Oxytropis chesneyoides Gontsch.
- Oxytropis chiliophylla Benth.
- Oxytropis chinglingensis C.W.Chang
- Oxytropis chionobia Bunge
- Oxytropis chionophylla Schrenk ex Fisch. & C.A.Mey.
- Oxytropis chitralensis Ali
- Oxytropis chorgossica Vassilcz.
- Oxytropis chrysocarpa Boiss.
- Oxytropis ciliata Turcz.
- Oxytropis cinerascens Bunge
- Oxytropis cinerea Vassilcz.
- Oxytropis coelestis Abdusal.
- Oxytropis coerulea (Pall.) DC.
- Oxytropis columbina Vassilcz.
- Oxytropis compacta Maassoumi & Joharchi
- Oxytropis confusa Bunge
- Oxytropis crassiuscula Boriss.
- Oxytropis cretacea Basil.
- Oxytropis cuspidata Bunge
- Oxytropis czapan-daghi B.Fedtsch.
- Oxytropis czekanowskii Jurtzev
- Oxytropis czerskii Jurtzev
- Oxytropis czukotica Jurtzev
- Oxytropis danorum Rech.f.
- Oxytropis darpirensis Jurtzev & A.P.Khokhr.
- Oxytropis dashtikavarensis Vassilcz.
- Oxytropis dasypoda Rupr. ex Boiss.
- Oxytropis datongensis Y.H.Wu
- Oxytropis deflexa (Pall.) DC.
- Oxytropis dehra-duni Vassilcz.
- Oxytropis densa Benth. ex Bunge
- Oxytropis densiflora P.C.Li
- Oxytropis diantha Bunge ex Maxim.
- Oxytropis dichroantha Schrenk ex Fisch. & C.A.Mey.
- Oxytropis didymophysa Bunge
- Oxytropis dinarica (Murb.) Wettst.
- Oxytropis diversifolia E.Peter
- Oxytropis dorogostajskyi Kuzen.
- Oxytropis dschagastaica Grubov & Vassilcz.
- Oxytropis dubia Turcz.
- Oxytropis dumbedanica Grubov & Vassilcz.
- Oxytropis duthieana Ali
- Oxytropis echidna Vved.
- Oxytropis eriocarpa Bunge
- Oxytropis ervicarpa Vved. ex Z.N.Filimonova
- Oxytropis evenorum Jurtzev & A.P.Khokhr.
- Oxytropis exserta Jurtzev
- Oxytropis falcata Bunge
- Oxytropis farsi Vassilcz.
- Oxytropis fasciculiflorum Vassilcz.
- Oxytropis fedtschenkoana Vassilcz.
- Oxytropis fedtschenkoi Vassilcz.
- Oxytropis ferganensis Vassilcz.
- Oxytropis fetida (Vill.) DC.
- Oxytropis fetisowii Bunge
- Oxytropis floribunda (Pall.) DC.
- Oxytropis fohlenensis Vassilcz.
- Oxytropis foucaudii Gillot
- Oxytropis fragilifolia N.Ulziykh.
- Oxytropis fragiliphylla Q.Wang, Chang Y.Yang, X.Y.Zhu & H.Ohashi
- Oxytropis frigida Kar. & Kir.
- Oxytropis fruticulosa Bunge
- Oxytropis fuscescens Vassilcz.
- Oxytropis gandeensis Y.H.Wu
- Oxytropis ganningensis C.W.Chang
- Oxytropis gebleri Fisch. ex Bunge
- Oxytropis gebleriana Schrenk
- Oxytropis gerzeensis P.C.Li
- Oxytropis gilgitensis Vassilcz.
- Oxytropis giraldii Ulbr.
- Oxytropis glabra DC.
- Oxytropis glandulosa Turcz.
- Oxytropis glareosa Vassilcz.
- Oxytropis globiflora Bunge
- Oxytropis gloriosa Ali
- Oxytropis gmelinii Fisch. ex Boriss.
- Oxytropis golengolensis Vassilcz.
- Oxytropis gorbunovii Boriss.
- Oxytropis gorodkovii Jurtzev
- Oxytropis graminetorum Vassilcz.
- Oxytropis grandiflora DC.
- Oxytropis griffithii Bunge ex Boiss.
- Oxytropis gubanovii Vassilcz.
- Oxytropis gueldenstaedtioides Ulbr.
- Oxytropis guilanica Maassoumi & Moradi
- Oxytropis guinanensis Y.H.Wu
- Oxytropis guntensis B.Fedtsch.
- Oxytropis gymnogyne Bunge
- Oxytropis hailarensis Kitag.
- Oxytropis halleri Bunge ex W.D.J.Koch
- Oxytropis hedgei Vassilcz.
- Oxytropis helenae N.S.Pavlova
- Oxytropis helvetica Scheele
- Oxytropis heratensis Bunge ex Boiss.
- Oxytropis heterophylla Bunge ex Maxim.
- Oxytropis heteropoda Bunge
- Oxytropis heterotricha Turcz.
- Oxytropis hindukuschensis Vassilcz.
- Oxytropis hippolyti Boriss.
- Oxytropis hirsuta Bunge
- Oxytropis hirsutiuscula Freyn
- Oxytropis hirta Bunge
- Oxytropis holanshanensis H.C.Fu
- Oxytropis huashixiaensis Y.H.Wu
- Oxytropis huddelsonii A.E.Porsild
- Oxytropis hudsonica (Greene) Fernald
- Oxytropis humifusa Kar. & Kir.
- Oxytropis × hybrida Brügger
- Oxytropis hypoglottoides (Baker) Ali
- Oxytropis hypsophila Bunge ex Boiss.
- Oxytropis hystrix Schrenk
- Oxytropis imbricata Kom.
- Oxytropis immersa (Baker) Bunge ex Lipsky
- Oxytropis inaria (Pall.) DC.
- Oxytropis incana Jurtzev
- Oxytropis incanescens Freyn
- Oxytropis includens Basil.
- Oxytropis indensis Vassilcz.
- Oxytropis indurata Maassoumi
- Oxytropis inopinata Jurtzev
- Oxytropis inschanica H.C.Fu & S.S.Cheng
- Oxytropis integripetala Bunge
- Oxytropis intermedia Bunge
- Oxytropis interposita Sipliv.
- Oxytropis iranica Vassilcz.
- Oxytropis irbis Saposhn.
- Oxytropis ishkashimorum Vassilcz.
- Oxytropis iskanderica B.Fedtsch.
- Oxytropis itoana Tatew.
- Oxytropis jabalambrensis (Pau) Podlech
- Oxytropis japonica Maxim.
- Oxytropis javaherdehi Maassoumi
- Oxytropis jordalii A.E.Porsild
- Oxytropis jucunda Vved.
- Oxytropis junatovii Sanchir
- Oxytropis jurtzevii Malyschev
- Oxytropis kalamii Vassilcz.
- Oxytropis kamelinii Vassilcz.
- Oxytropis kamtschatica Hultén
- Oxytropis kansuensis Bunge
- Oxytropis karataviensis Pavlov
- Oxytropis karavaevii Jurtzev
- Oxytropis karjaginii Grossh.
- Oxytropis kasakorum Knjaz.
- Oxytropis kaspensis Krasnob. & Pshenich.
- Oxytropis katangensis Basil.
- Oxytropis kateninii Jurtzev
- Oxytropis kazidanica Vassilcz.
- Oxytropis ketmenica Saposhn.
- Oxytropis khinjahi Vassilcz.
- Oxytropis klementzii N.Ulziykh.
- Oxytropis knjazevii Vasjukov
- Oxytropis kobukensis S.L.Welsh
- Oxytropis kodarensis Jurtzev & Malyschev
- Oxytropis kokrinensis A.E.Porsild
- Oxytropis komei Saposhn.
- Oxytropis kopetdagensis Gontsch.
- Oxytropis korabensis (Kümmerle & Jáv.) A.W.Hill
- Oxytropis kordkoyensis Maassoumi
- Oxytropis kossinskyi B.Fedtsch. & Basil.
- Oxytropis kotschyana Boiss. & Hohen.
- Oxytropis kozhuharovii D.K.Pavlova, D.Dimitrov & M.Nikolova
- Oxytropis krylovii Schipcz.
- Oxytropis kubanensis Leskov
- Oxytropis kuchanensis Vassilcz.
- Oxytropis kuhistanica Abdusal.
- Oxytropis kukkonenii Vassilcz.
- Oxytropis kumaonensis Vassilcz.
- Oxytropis kumbelica Grubov & Vassilcz.
- Oxytropis kunarensis Vassilcz.
- Oxytropis kunashiriensis Kitam.
- Oxytropis kungurensis Knjaz.
- Oxytropis kuramensis Abdusal.
- Oxytropis kusnetzovii Krylov & Steinb.
- Oxytropis kyziltalensis Vassilcz.
- Oxytropis ladyginii Krylov
- Oxytropis lagopus Nutt.
- Oxytropis lambertii Pursh
- Oxytropis lanata (Pall.) DC.
- Oxytropis lanceatifoliola H.Ohba, S.Akiyama & S.K.Wu
- Oxytropis langshanica H.C.Fu
- Oxytropis lanuginosa Kom.
- Oxytropis lapponica (Wahlenb.) J.Gay
- Oxytropis larionovii Grubov & Vassilcz.
- Oxytropis lasiocarpa Gontsch.
- Oxytropis lasiopoda Bunge
- Oxytropis latialata P.C.Li
- Oxytropis latibracteata Jurtzev
- Oxytropis lavrenkoi N.Ulziykh.
- Oxytropis laxiracemosa Vassilcz.
- Oxytropis lazica Boiss.
- Oxytropis lehmannii Bunge
- Oxytropis leptophylla (Pall.) DC.
- Oxytropis leptophysa Bunge
- Oxytropis × lessingiana Knjaz.
- Oxytropis leucantha (Pall.) Pers.
- Oxytropis leucocyanea Bunge
- Oxytropis leucotricha Turcz.
- Oxytropis lhasaensis X.Y.Zhu
- Oxytropis liliputa Vassilcz.
- Oxytropis linczevskii Gontsch.
- Oxytropis linearibracteata P.C.Li
- Oxytropis lipskyi Gontsch.
- Oxytropis lithophila Vassilcz.
- Oxytropis litoralis Kom.
- Oxytropis litwinowii B.Fedtsch.
- Oxytropis longialata P.C.Li
- Oxytropis longibracteata Kar. & Kir.
- Oxytropis longirostra DC.
- Oxytropis lupinoides Grossh.
- Oxytropis lutchensis Franch.
- Oxytropis luteocaerulea (Baker) Ali
- Oxytropis lydiae Vassilcz.
- Oxytropis macrobotrys Bunge
- Oxytropis macrocarpa Kar. & Kir.
- Oxytropis macrodonta Gontsch.
- Oxytropis macrosema Bunge
- Oxytropis × madiotii Rouy
- Oxytropis maduoensis Y.H.Wu
- Oxytropis mahneshanensis Maassoumi
- Oxytropis maidantalensis B.Fedtsch.
- Oxytropis malacophylla Bunge
- Oxytropis malloryana Dunn
- Oxytropis maqinensis Y.H.Wu
- Oxytropis marco-poloi Vassilcz.
- Oxytropis margacea Vassilcz.
- Oxytropis martjanovii Krylov
- Oxytropis masarensis Vassilcz.
- Oxytropis maydelliana Trautv.
- Oxytropis megalantha H.Boissieu
- Oxytropis megalorrhyncha Nevski
- Oxytropis meinshausenii Schrenk
- Oxytropis melaleuca Bunge
- Oxytropis melanocalyx Bunge
- Oxytropis melanotricha Bunge
- Oxytropis merkensis Bunge
- Oxytropis mertensiana Turcz.
- Oxytropis michelsonii B.Fedtsch.
- Oxytropis micrantha Bunge ex Maxim.
- Oxytropis microcarpa Gontsch.
- Oxytropis microphylla (Pall.) DC.
- Oxytropis microsphaera Bunge
- Oxytropis middendorffii Trautv.
- Oxytropis minjanensis Rech.f.
- Oxytropis mixotriche Bunge
- Oxytropis moellendorffii Bunge ex Maxim.
- Oxytropis mollis Royle ex Benth.
- Oxytropis mongolica Kom.
- Oxytropis monophylla Grubov
- Oxytropis montana (L.) DC.
- Oxytropis monticola A.Gray
- Oxytropis morenarum Vassilcz.
- Oxytropis multiceps Nutt.
- Oxytropis mumynabadensis B.Fedtsch.
- Oxytropis muricata (Pall.) DC.
- Oxytropis myriophylla (Pall.) DC.
- Oxytropis nana Nutt.
- Oxytropis nanda-devi Vassilcz.
- Oxytropis neglecta J.Gay ex Ten.
- Oxytropis neimonggolica C.W.Chang & Y.Z.Zhao
- Oxytropis neorechingeriana Vassilcz.
- Oxytropis nepalensis Vassilcz.
- Oxytropis niedzweckiana Popov
- Oxytropis nigrescens (Pall.) Fisch. ex DC.
- Oxytropis nikolai Filim. & Abduss.
- Oxytropis nitens Turcz.
- Oxytropis nivea Bunge
- Oxytropis nuda Basil.
- Oxytropis nuristanica Vassilcz.
- Oxytropis nutans Bunge
- Oxytropis ochotensis Bunge
- Oxytropis ochrantha Turcz.
- Oxytropis ochrocephala Bunge
- Oxytropis ochroleuca Bunge
- Oxytropis ochrolongibracteata X.Y.Zhu & H.Ohashi
- Oxytropis ocrensis F.Conti & Bartolucci
- Oxytropis oligantha Bunge
- Oxytropis oreophila A.Gray
- Oxytropis ornata Vassilcz.
- Oxytropis oroboides Vassilcz.
- Oxytropis ovczinnikovii Abdusal.
- Oxytropis owerinii Bunge
- Oxytropis oxyphylla (Pall.) DC.
- Oxytropis oxyphylloides Popov
- Oxytropis pakistanica Vassilcz.
- Oxytropis pallasii Pers.
- Oxytropis pamiroalajca Abdusal.
- Oxytropis panjshirica Podlech & Deml
- Oxytropis parasericeopetala P.C.Li
- Oxytropis parryi A.Gray
- Oxytropis parvanensis Vassilcz.
- Oxytropis pauciflora Bunge
- Oxytropis pavlovii B.Fedtsch. & Basil.
- Oxytropis pellita Bunge
- Oxytropis penduliflora Gontsch.
- Oxytropis persica Boiss.
- Oxytropis peschkovae Popov
- Oxytropis physocarpa Ledeb.
- Oxytropis piceetorum Vassilcz.
- Oxytropis pilosa (L.) DC.
- Oxytropis pilosissima Vved.
- Oxytropis platonychia Bunge
- Oxytropis platysema Schrenk
- Oxytropis podlechii Vassilcz.
- Oxytropis podocarpa A.Gray
- Oxytropis podoloba Kar. & Kir.
- Oxytropis polyphylla Ledeb.
- Oxytropis poncinsii Franch.
- Oxytropis ponomarjevii Knjaz.
- Oxytropis popoviana Peschkova
- Oxytropis potaninii Bunge ex Palib.
- Oxytropis prenja (Beck) Beck
- Oxytropis proboscidea Bunge
- Oxytropis prostrata (Pall.) DC.
- Oxytropis protopopovii Kom.
- Oxytropis proxima Boriss.
- Oxytropis przewalskii Kom.
- Oxytropis pseudocoerulea P.C.Li
- Oxytropis pseudofrigida Saposhn.
- Oxytropis pseudoglandulosa Gontsch. ex Grubov
- Oxytropis pseudohirsuta Q.Wang & Chang Y.Yang
- Oxytropis pseudohirsutiuscula Vassilcz.
- Oxytropis pseudoleptophysa Boriss.
- Oxytropis pseudomyriophylla S.S.Cheng ex X.Y.Zhu, H.Ohashi & Y.B.Deng
- Oxytropis pseudorosea Filim.
- Oxytropis pseudosuavis Maassoumi
- Oxytropis puberula Boriss.
- Oxytropis pulvinoides Vassilcz.
- Oxytropis pumila Fisch. ex DC.
- Oxytropis pumilio (Pall.) Ledeb.
- Oxytropis purpurea (Bald.) Markgr.
- Oxytropis pusilla Bunge
- Oxytropis putoranica M.M.Ivanova
- Oxytropis qaidamensis Y.H.Wu
- Oxytropis qamdoensis X.Y.Zhu, Y.F.Du & H.Ohashi
- Oxytropis qilianshanica C.W.Chang & C.L.Zhang ex X.Y.Zhu & H.Ohashi
- Oxytropis qinghaiensis Y.H.Wu
- Oxytropis qingnanensis Y.H.Wu
- Oxytropis qitaiensis X.Y.Zhu, H.Ohashi & Y.B.Deng
- Oxytropis racemosa Turcz.
- Oxytropis ramosissima Kom.
- Oxytropis rarytkinensis N.S.Pavlova
- Oxytropis rautii L.R.Dangwal & R.D.Gaur
- Oxytropis rechingeri Vassilcz.
- Oxytropis recognita Bunge
- Oxytropis regelii Vassilcz.
- Oxytropis reniformis P.C.Li
- Oxytropis retusa Matsum.
- Oxytropis reverdattoi Jurtzev
- Oxytropis revoluta Ledeb.
- Oxytropis × rhaetica Brügger
- Oxytropis rhizantha Palib.
- Oxytropis rhodontha Vassilcz.
- Oxytropis rhynchophysa Schrenk
- Oxytropis ribumoo Vassilcz.
- Oxytropis rosea Bunge
- Oxytropis roseiformis B.Fedtsch.
- Oxytropis rostrata Vassilcz.
- Oxytropis rubriargillosa Vassilcz.
- Oxytropis rubricaudex Hultén
- Oxytropis rudbariensis Vassilcz.
- Oxytropis ruebsaamenii B.Fedtsch.
- Oxytropis rupifraga Bunge
- Oxytropis ruthenica Vassilcz.
- Oxytropis sabzavarensis Maassoumi
- Oxytropis sacciformis H.C.Fu
- Oxytropis sachalinensis Miyabe & Tatew.
- Oxytropis sajanensis Jurtzev
- Oxytropis salangensis Podlech & Deml
- Oxytropis salicetorum Vassilcz.
- Oxytropis salukensis Maassoumi
- Oxytropis sanjappae Chaudhary
- Oxytropis saperlebulensis Vassilcz.
- Oxytropis saposhnikovii Krylov
- Oxytropis sarkandensis Vassilcz.
- Oxytropis sata-kandaonensis Vassilcz.
- Oxytropis satpaevii Bajtenov
- Oxytropis saurica Saposhn.
- Oxytropis savellanica Bunge ex Boiss.
- Oxytropis scabrida Gontsch.
- Oxytropis scammaniana Hultén
- Oxytropis schachimardanica Filim.
- Oxytropis scheludjakovae Karav. & Jurtzev
- Oxytropis schmorgunoviae Jurtzev
- Oxytropis schrenkii Trautv.
- Oxytropis selengensis Bunge
- Oxytropis semenowii Bunge
- Oxytropis seravschanica Gontsch.
- Oxytropis sericea Nutt.
- Oxytropis sericopetala Prain ex C.E.C.Fisch.
- Oxytropis setifera Kom.
- Oxytropis setosa (Pall.) DC.
- Oxytropis sewerzowii Bunge
- Oxytropis shahvarica Maassoumi
- Oxytropis shanxiensis X.Y.Zhu
- Oxytropis shennongjiaensis D.G.Zhang, J.T.Chen, T.Deng & H.Sun
- Oxytropis shivae Aswal, Goel & Mehrotra
- Oxytropis siah-sangi Vassilcz.
- Oxytropis sibajensis Knjaz.
- Oxytropis sichuanica C.W.Chang
- Oxytropis siegizmundii N.S.Pavlova
- Oxytropis sinkiangensis S.S.Cheng ex C.W.Chang
- Oxytropis siomensis Abdusal.
- Oxytropis sitaipaiensis T.P.Wang ex C.W.Chang
- Oxytropis sivehensis Maassoumi & Amini Rad
- Oxytropis siziwangensis Y.Z.Zhao & Zhong Y.Zhu
- Oxytropis sobolevskajae Pjak
- Oxytropis sojakii Vassilcz.
- Oxytropis songorica (Pall.) DC.
- Oxytropis sordida (Willd.) Pers.
- Oxytropis spicata (Pall.) O.Fedtsch. & B.Fedtsch.
- Oxytropis spinifer Vassilcz.
- Oxytropis splendens Douglas
- Oxytropis squammulosa DC.
- Oxytropis staintoniana Ali
- Oxytropis staintonii Vassilcz.
- Oxytropis stenofoliola Polozhij
- Oxytropis stenophylla Bunge
- Oxytropis stracheyana Bunge
- Oxytropis strobilacea Bunge
- Oxytropis stukovii Palib.
- Oxytropis suavis Boriss.
- Oxytropis subcapitata Gontsch.
- Oxytropis submutica Bunge
- Oxytropis subnutans (Jurtzev) Jurtzev
- Oxytropis subpodoloba P.C.Li
- Oxytropis subverticillaris C.A.Mey.
- Oxytropis sulphurea (Fisch. ex DC.) Ledeb.
- Oxytropis sumneviczii Krylov
- Oxytropis suprajenissejensis Kuvaev & Sonnikova
- Oxytropis surculosa Rech.f.
- Oxytropis susamyrensis B.Fedtsch.
- Oxytropis susumanica Jurtzev
- Oxytropis sutaica N.Ulziykh.
- Oxytropis sutakensis Maassoumi
- Oxytropis sverdrupii Lynge
- Oxytropis sylvatica (Pall.) DC.
- Oxytropis szovitsii Boiss. & Buhse
- Oxytropis tachtensis Franch.
- Oxytropis talassica Gontsch.
- Oxytropis taldycola Grubov & Vassilcz.
- Oxytropis talgarica Popov
- Oxytropis taochensis Kom.
- Oxytropis tashkurensis S.H.Cheng ex X.Y.Zhu, Y.F.Du & H.Ohashi
- Oxytropis tatarica Hook.f. & Thomson ex Bunge
- Oxytropis tenuirostris Boriss.
- Oxytropis tenuis Palib.
- Oxytropis tenuissima Vassilcz.
- Oxytropis terekensis B.Fedtsch.
- Oxytropis teres DC.
- Oxytropis tianschanica Bunge
- Oxytropis tichomirovii Jurtzev
- Oxytropis tilingii Bunge
- Oxytropis todomoshiriensis Miyabe & T.Miyake
- Oxytropis tomentosa Gontsch.
- Oxytropis tomoriensis Kit Tan, Shuka & Vold
- Oxytropis tompudae Popov
- Oxytropis torrentium Vassilcz.
- Oxytropis tragacanthoides Fisch. ex DC.
- Oxytropis trajectorum B.Fedtsch.
- Oxytropis transalaica Vassilcz.
- Oxytropis trichocalycina Bunge ex Boiss.
- Oxytropis trichophora Franch.
- Oxytropis trichophysa Bunge
- Oxytropis trichosphaera Freyn
- Oxytropis triflora Hoppe
- Oxytropis triphylla (Pall.) DC.
- Oxytropis tschatkalensis Lar.N.Vassiljeva
- Oxytropis tschimganica Gontsch.
- Oxytropis tschujae Bunge
- Oxytropis tudanensis X.Y.Zhu, H.Ohashi & Si Feng Li
- Oxytropis tukemansuensis X.Y.Zhu, H.Ohashi & Y.B.Deng
- Oxytropis tunnellii Vassilcz.
- Oxytropis turczaninovii Jurtzev
- Oxytropis tyttantha Gontsch.
- Oxytropis ugamensis Vassilcz.
- Oxytropis ugamica Gontsch.
- Oxytropis ulzijchutagii Sanchir
- Oxytropis uniflora Jurtzev
- Oxytropis uralensis (L.) DC.
- Oxytropis urumovii Jáv.
- Oxytropis uschakovii Jurtzev
- Oxytropis vadimii Vassilcz.
- Oxytropis vakhdzhirii Vassilcz.
- Oxytropis valerii Vassilcz.
- Oxytropis varlakovii Serg.
- Oxytropis vassilczenkoi Jurtzev
- Oxytropis vassilievii Jurtzev
- Oxytropis vasskovskyi Jurtzev
- Oxytropis vavilovii Vassilcz.
- Oxytropis vermicularis Freyn
- Oxytropis viae-amicitiae Vassilcz.
- Oxytropis viridiflava Kom.
- Oxytropis volkii Rech.f.
- Oxytropis vositensis Vassilcz.
- Oxytropis vvedenskyi Filim.
- Oxytropis williamsii Vassilcz.
- Oxytropis wologdensis Knjaz.
- Oxytropis wrangelii Jurtzev
- Oxytropis wutaiensis Tatew. & Hurus.
- Oxytropis xidatanensis Y.H.Wu
- Oxytropis xinghaiensis Y.H.Wu
- Oxytropis xinglongshanica C.W.Chang
- Oxytropis yanchiensis X.Y.Zhu, H.Ohashi & L.R.Xu
- Oxytropis yekenensis X.Y.Zhu, H.Ohashi & Y.B.Deng
- Oxytropis yunnanensis Franch.
- Oxytropis zadoiensis Y.H.Wu
- Oxytropis zaprjagaevae Abdusal.
- Oxytropis zaquensis Y.H.Wu
- Oxytropis zekogensis Y.H.Wu
- Oxytropis zemuensis (W.W.Sm.) L.B.Chaudhary
