= Woolly locoweed =

Woolly locoweed is a common name for several plants and may refer to:

- Astragalus mollissimus, native to the southwestern United States
- Oxytropis lambertii
