= O. lambertii =

O. lambertii may refer to:

- Omphalobium lambertii, a woody plant
- Oxytropis lambertii, a Northern American legume
