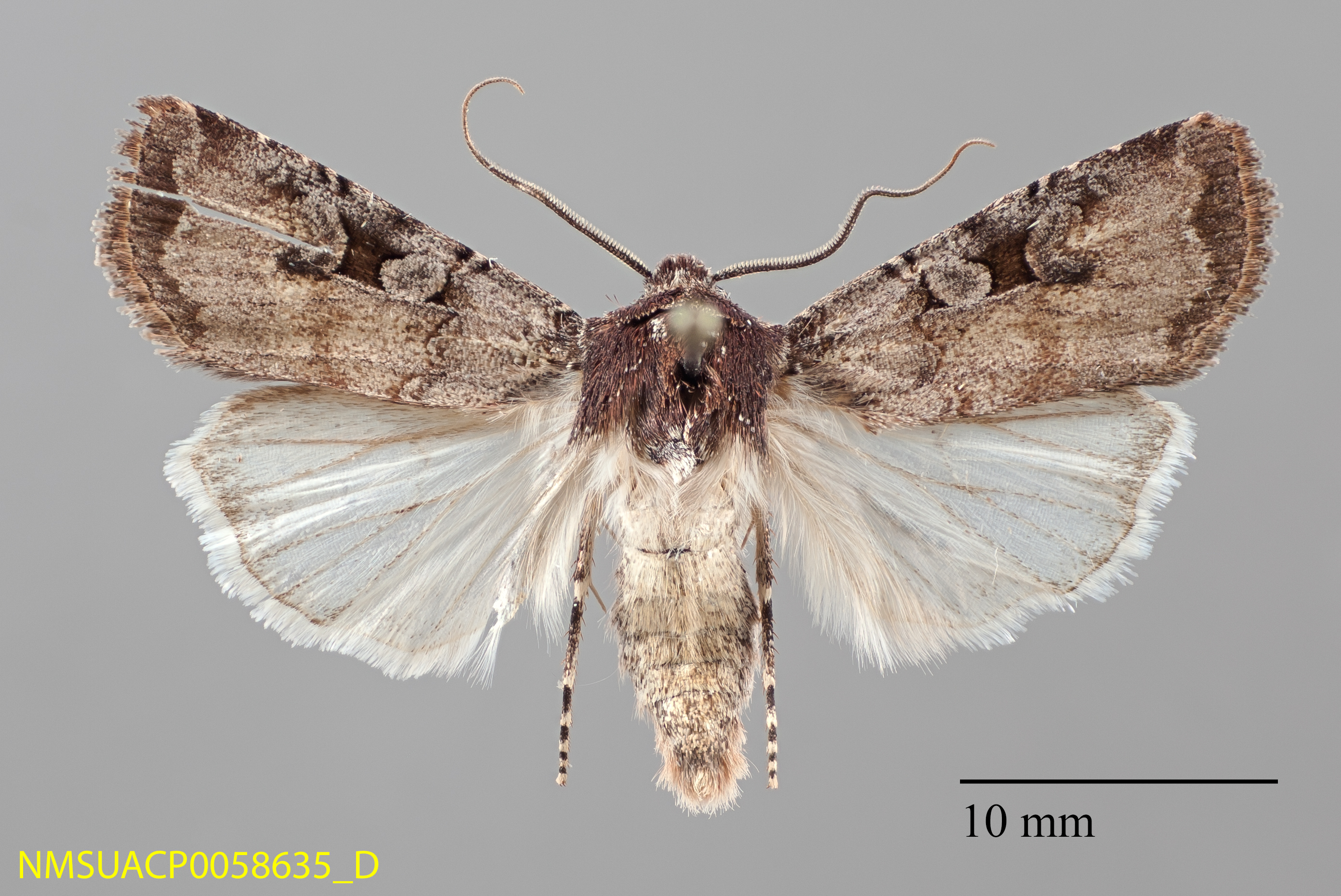

Scientific classification
- Kingdom: Animalia
- Phylum: Arthropoda
- Class: Insecta
- Order: Lepidoptera
- Superfamily: Noctuoidea
- Family: Noctuidae
- Genus: Euxoa
- Species: E. albipennis

Binomial name
- Euxoa albipennis (Grote, 1876)

Synonyms
- Agrotis albipennis Grote, 1876; Agrotis verticalis Grote, 1880; Agrotis nigripennis Grote, 1881; Carneades malis Smith, 1900; Euxoa bialba Smith, 1905; Euxoa indensa Smith, 1910

= Euxoa albipennis =

Species of moth

Euxoa albipennis is a moth of the family Noctuidae first described by Augustus Radcliffe Grote in 1876. It is found from coast to coast in southern Canada and the northern parts of the United States, ranging southward in the west to New Mexico, Arizona and California.

The wingspan is 30–35 mm.

Larvae have been reported from Oxytropis, Lupinus, Melilotus, Helianthus, Solanum tuberosum and Zea mays.
