= Oxytropis sobolevskajae =

Scientific classification
- Kingdom: Plantae
- Clade: Tracheophytes
- Clade: Angiosperms
- Clade: Eudicots
- Clade: Rosids
- Order: Fabales
- Family: Fabaceae
- Subfamily: Faboideae
- Genus: Oxytropis
- Species: O. sobolevskajae

Binomial name
- Oxytropis sobolevskajae Pjak

Species of plant

Oxytropis sobolevskajae is a species of flowering plant in the family Fabaceae, native to Tuva in southern Siberia. A perennial found only in the Tuva Depression, its closest relative is probably Oxytropis leptophylla.
