= Locoweed =

Plant that produces swainsonine

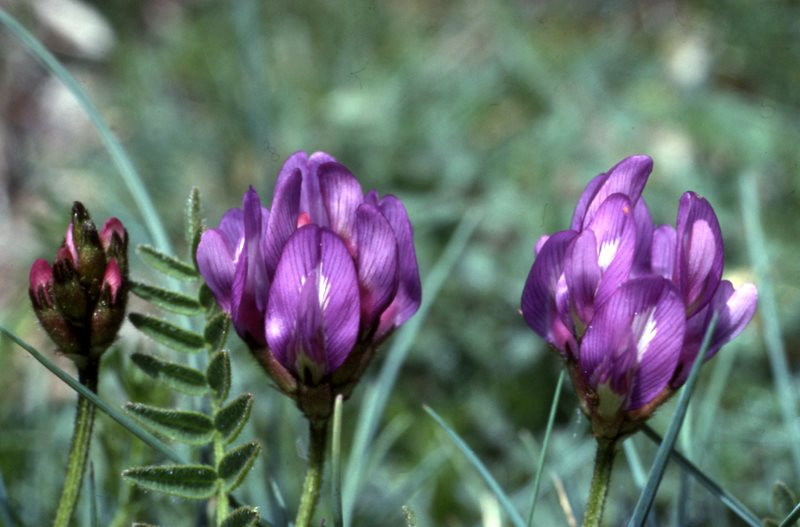
Oxytropis sericea in bloom

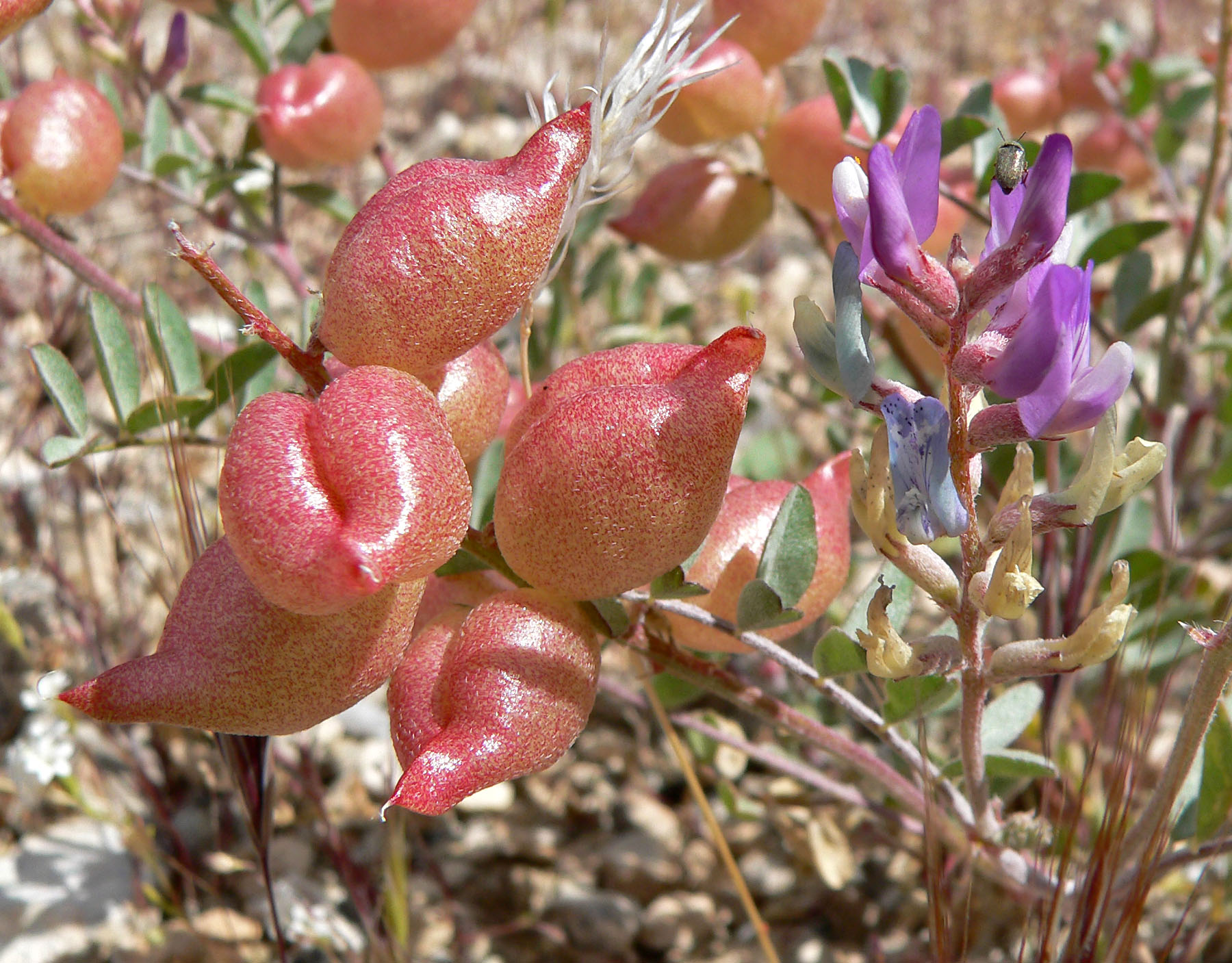
Astragalus lentiginosus in fruit

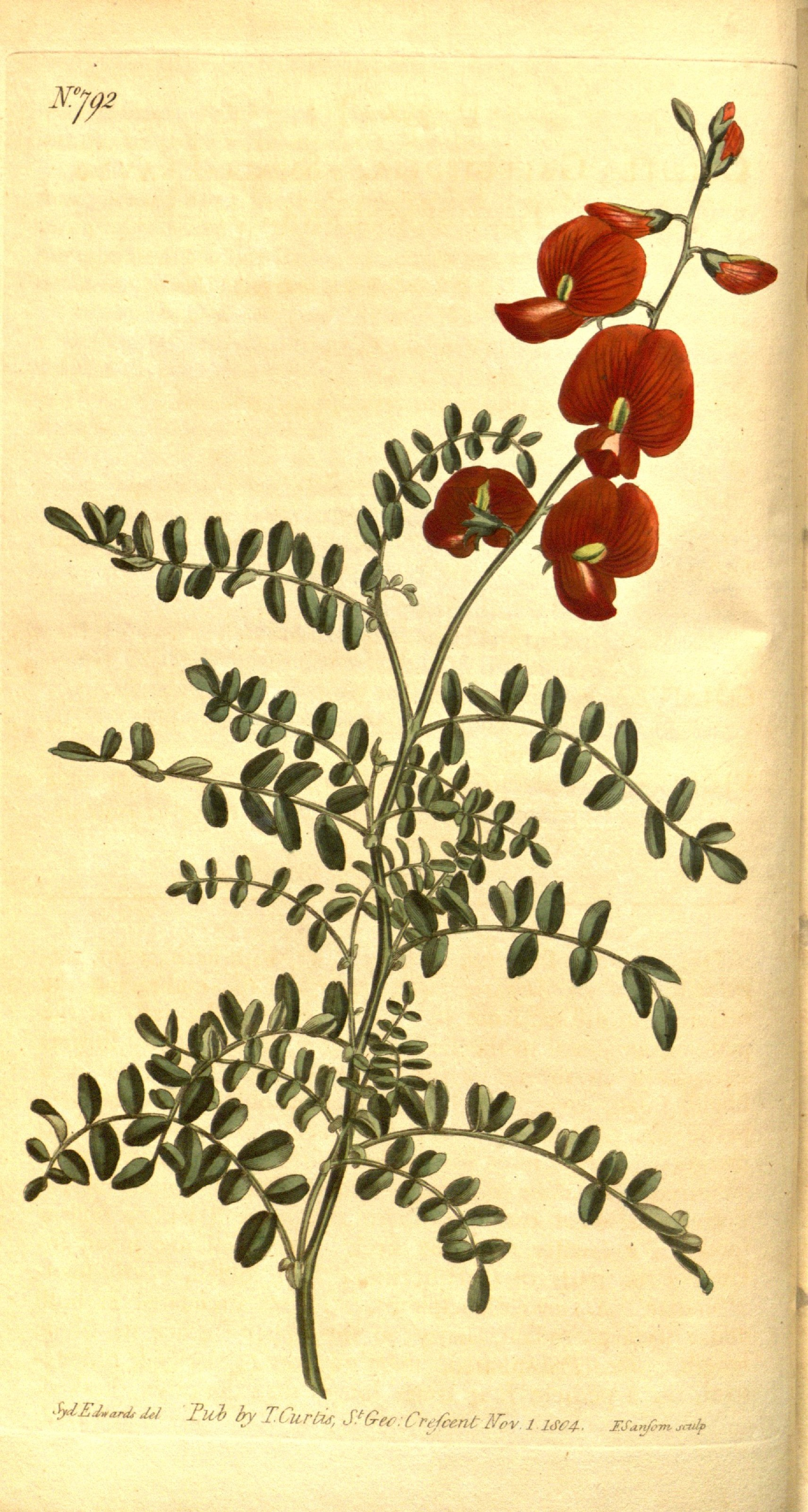
Swainsona galegifolia

Locoweed (also crazyweed and loco) is a common name in North America for any plant that produces swainsonine, an alkaloid harmful to livestock. Worldwide, swainsonine is produced by a small number of species, most of them in three genera of the flowering plant family Fabaceae: Oxytropis and Astragalus in North America, and Swainsona in Australia. The term locoweed usually refers only to the North American species of Oxytropis and Astragalus, but this article includes the other species as well. Some references may incorrectly list Datura as locoweed.

Locoweed is relatively palatable to livestock, and some individual animals will seek it out. Livestock poisoned by chronic ingestion of large amounts of swainsonine develop a medical condition known as locoism (loco disease, swainsonine disease, swainsonine toxicosis in North America) and pea struck in Australia. Locoism is reported most often in cattle, sheep, and horses, but has also been reported in elk and deer. It is the most widespread poisonous plant problem in the western United States.

Most of the 2,000 species of Astragalus, including many that are commonly known as locoweeds, do not produce swainsonine. Some species, including a few that produce swainsonine, accumulate selenium. This has led to confusion between swainsonine poisoning and selenium poisoning due to this genus.

== History and etymology ==
The first technical account (in English) of locoism was published in 1873, in the United States. Linguists have documented locoism in use among English speakers by 1889, and both loco and locoweed in use by 1844.

Loco, a loanword from Spanish, is understood by most English-speaking users in the sense of crazy, and this appears to have also been the sense understood by vaqueros. In Spanish, however, loco has an older, different sense. In Spain, where the native Astragalus species are not known to cause locoism, for centuries loco has been applied to some of these species in the sense of rambling: common names include yerba loca (hierba loca; rambling herb) and chocho loco (rambling lupine).

The presence of a toxin in locoweed was demonstrated in 1909. Initially, the toxin was reported to be a barium compound, but that was soon disproved. Swainsonine, first isolated from Swainsona, was shown to be responsible for pea struck in 1979, and was reported in both Oxytropis and Astragalus in 1982.

Since 1982, swainsonine has been isolated from still more plants, some of which also are reported to cause locoism or medical conditions similar to it. The first report of locoism in South America, involving Astragalus pehuenches, was published in 2000.

== Taxa producing swainsonine ==
Swainsonine is produced by a small number of species, including species in several genera of plants and two genera of fungi.

Oxytropis is distributed throughout western North America, particularly in the Great Plains and Rocky Mountains. However, most species of Oxytropis have narrow habitat requirements and within those habitats are abundant only in unusually wet years. The species most frequently encountered by livestock are O. lambertii (Lambert locoweed, purple locoweed, woolly locoweed) and especially Oxytropis sericea (white locoweed, white point locoweed, white point loco). Swainsonine has also been found in O. campestris (in Canada).

Some species of Astragalus (milkvetch) are also referred to as locoweed. Swainsonine has been found in:

- A. earlei (Big Bend loco)
- A. mollissimus (purple woolly loco)
- A. pubentissimus (green river milkvetch)
- A. lentiginosis (spotted locoweed, freckled milkvetch)
- A. wootoni (garbancillo)
- A. nothoxys (sheep milkvetch)
- A. tephrodes (ashen milkvetch)
- A. humistratus (ground cover milkvetch)

In Argentina, locoism (locoismo) was first reported in 2000. A flock of sheep grazing a pasture with Astragalus pehuenches was poisoned and 220 sheep (73%) died. Although this was the first report of locoism in South America, swainsonine had been isolated previously from A. pehuenches and several other species in Argentina and Peru.

In the Old World, native plants causing locoism have not been reported. Astragalus lusitanicus in Morocco was suspected, but has been shown be neither a producer of swainsonine nor an accumulator of selenium. Its toxicity is suspected to be due to a novel alkaloid.

In Australia, species of Swainsona (Darling pea) that cause pea struck include:

- S. luteola
- S. greyana (hairy Darling pea)
- S. galegifolia (smooth Darling pea)

Astragalus and Oxytropis are two of 20 genera (and 78 names of genera) in the tribe Galegeae, subtribe Astragalinae. Some authorities include Swainsona in the subtribe. Formerly, Swainsona was in another subtribe, Coluteinae, that has been combined into Astragalinae.

Swainsonine has also been isolated from Sida carpinifolia and Ipomoea carnea, and both species have been reported to cause locoism.

Embellisia, a fungus isolated from Oxytropis lambertii, has also been shown to produce swainsonine and to cause locoism in rats. Rhizoctonia leguminicola, a fungal plant pathogen that may occur on red clover (Trifolium pratense), also produces swainsonine. Although intoxication due to this fungus resembles locoism, it has additional signs and symptoms due to the production of other toxins.

== Pathology ==
Intoxication with swainsonine has several kinds of effect.

Livestock that graze for several weeks on locoweed (and little else) develop a lysosomal storage disease similar to genetic mannosidosis. Swainsonine inhibits a lysosomal enzyme, alpha-mannosidase. This results in abnormal accumulation of the molecules normally processed by the enzyme, and this accumulation leads to vacuolation of most tissues. Vacuolation is most obvious in neurons and epithelial cells. The vacuolation resolves shortly after poisoning is discontinued, but if the vacuolation is so severe that it destroys cells, it may result in some neurologic damage that is irreversible and permanent. The damage is highly varied. In cattle at high altitude, complications of locoism can include congestive heart failure.

== Diagnosis ==
Diagnosis of clinical poisoning is generally made by documenting exposure, identifying the neurologic signs, and analyzing blood serum for alpha-mannosidase activity and swainsonine.

In mule deer, clinical signs of locoism are similar to chronic wasting disease. Histological signs of vacuolation provide a differential diagnosis.

Sub-clinical intoxication has been investigated in cattle grazing on Astragalus mollissimus. As the estimated intake of swainsonine increased, blood serum alpha-mannosidase activity and albumin decreased, and alkaline phosphatase and thyroid hormone increased.

== Prevention ==
Because O. sericea is both frequently encountered and relatively palatable to livestock, it is an important cause of economic losses in livestock production. Keeping livestock away from locoweed-infested pasture in spring and fall when grass and other forbs are not actively growing is recommended. Another suggested remedy is to provide palatable supplemental nutrients if animals are to be kept in infested pasture. These remedies take into account livestock preference for locoweed during seasons when grass is dry and not very nutritious. Conditioned food aversion has been used experimentally to discourage livestock from eating it. In horses, a small study has shown promising results using lithium chloride as the aversive agent.

== See also ==
- List of plants poisonous to equines
- Nutrition disorder
