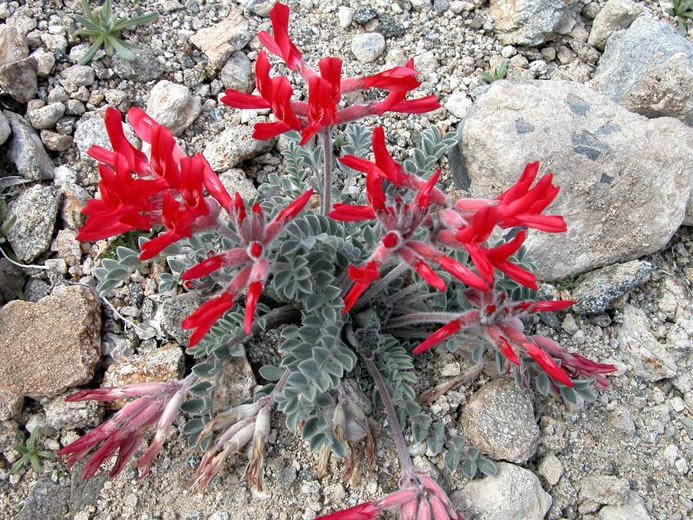

Conservation status
- Apparently Secure (NatureServe)

Scientific classification
- Kingdom: Plantae
- Clade: Embryophytes
- Clade: Tracheophytes
- Clade: Spermatophytes
- Clade: Angiosperms
- Clade: Eudicots
- Clade: Rosids
- Order: Fabales
- Family: Fabaceae
- Subfamily: Faboideae
- Genus: Astragalus
- Species: A. coccineus

Binomial name
- Astragalus coccineus Brandegee

= Astragalus coccineus =

Species of plant

Astragalus coccineus is a species of milkvetch known by the common name scarlet locoweed or scarlet milkvetch. It is native to the deserts, scrub, and chaparral of the Southwestern United States in Arizona, California, and Nevada, and in northwestern Mexico.

== Description ==
Astragalus coccineus is a clumpy perennial herb coated thickly in white hairs. Leaves are up to 10 centimeters (4 in) long and are made up of oblong, pointed leaflets. The plant can be distinguished from most other milkvetches by its large, bright scarlet flowers. The inflorescence has up to 10 flowers each 3 to 4 centimeters long, or longer. Its

The fruit is a plump legume pod which dries to a hairy, leathery texture. It is up to 4 centimeters long.

Astragalus coccineus has major toxicity.

Its bloom season is March–June.

== Distribution and habitat ==
The plant is distributed throughout the desert mountains of east-central California, southwestern Nevada, northwestern Arizona, and northern Baja California. It can be found in gravelly soil in sagebrush scrub and pinyon-juniper woodland communities.

It is most commonly found in the months of March, April, and May.

Its conservation status is listed as G3, which means it is vulnerable.

== Ecology ==
Both the red color and elongated shape of the species' flowers are attractive to hummingbirds.

It is also the host plant for the Reakirt's blue, the arrowhead blue, the marine blue, and Queen Alexandra's sulphur.
