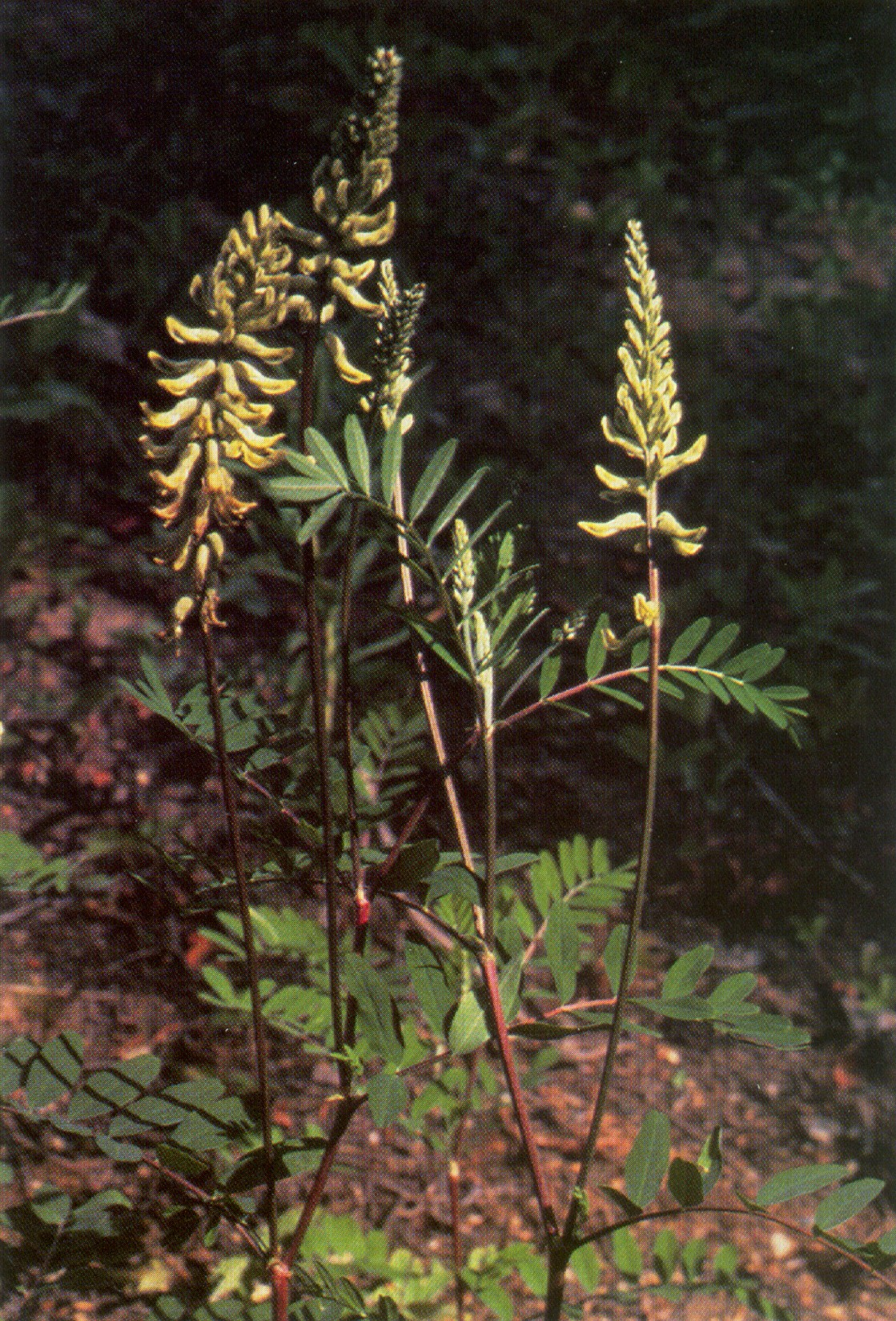

Conservation status
- Secure (NatureServe)

Scientific classification
- Kingdom: Plantae
- Clade: Embryophytes
- Clade: Tracheophytes
- Clade: Spermatophytes
- Clade: Angiosperms
- Clade: Eudicots
- Clade: Rosids
- Order: Fabales
- Family: Fabaceae
- Subfamily: Faboideae
- Genus: Astragalus
- Species: A. canadensis

Binomial name
- Astragalus canadensis L.

= Astragalus canadensis =

Canadian milkvetch

Species of legume

Astragalus canadensis is a common and widespread member of the milkvetch genus in the legume family, known commonly as Canadian milkvetch. The plant is found throughout Canada and the United States in many habitats including wetlands, woodlands, and prairies.

This species has three subspecies:

Astragalus canadensis var. canadensis native to eastern and central US, especially around a strip from Louisiana to Ontario.

Astragalus canadensis var. mortonii native to northwest US, especially eastern Washington and western Idaho.

Astragalus canadensis var. brevidens native to northwest US, including north California.

== Uses ==
Like other Astragalus species, A. canadensis is somewhat toxic, but it has been used medicinally by Native American groups such as the Blackfoot and Lakota people, particularly the roots. The roots were eaten raw or boiled, and used in broth. The roots were usually gathered in spring and fall.

== Description ==
The perennial plant has a taproot and several thin, erect, green stems. The alternate, pinnate leaves are elliptic, each leaflet is up to 3 cm long. The stem is up to 1.20 m high. It has inflorescences of tubular, greenish-white flowers, which appear between May and July. The fruits are beanlike, the pods rattle when the seeds are dry.

== Ecology ==
It is used as a food source of Acanthoscelides aureolus, a tiny weevil. Bumblebees, honeybees, and other bees use the plant for nectar. Deer, rabbits, and groundhogs can eat the leaves, unlike other species in the Astragalus genus. Colias alexandra is hosted by this milkvetch.

== Distribution and habitat ==
Astragalus canadensis is usually found naturally in moist prairies, open woodlands, roadsides, thickets, and streambanks in most United States and parts of Canada. The plants tend to colonize in these areas.

It is most commonly found in the months of June, July, and August. 81% of the time it was found in the US and 9.8% it was found in Canada.

It has a global rank of G5, meaning it is secure. It is found across most of the US and Canada, excluding parts of the east, south and north of the countries. It also has many local ranks, including S5 (secure) in British Columbia, Montana, Manitoba, and Iowa, S4 (apparently secure) in Alberta, Saskatchewan, Ontario, Indiana, West Virginia, and Virginia. Many states also have an endangered status for the species including S3 (vulnerable) in the Northwest Territories, Wyoming, Colorado, Louisiana, New York, and North Carolina, S2 (endangered) in Utah, Ohio, and Vermont. Some states have a S1 status (very endangered) including Michigan, Alabama, Georgia, Pennsylvania, and Maryland. It is extinct in Washington D.C. Many states don’t have a local status.

== Gallery of photos ==
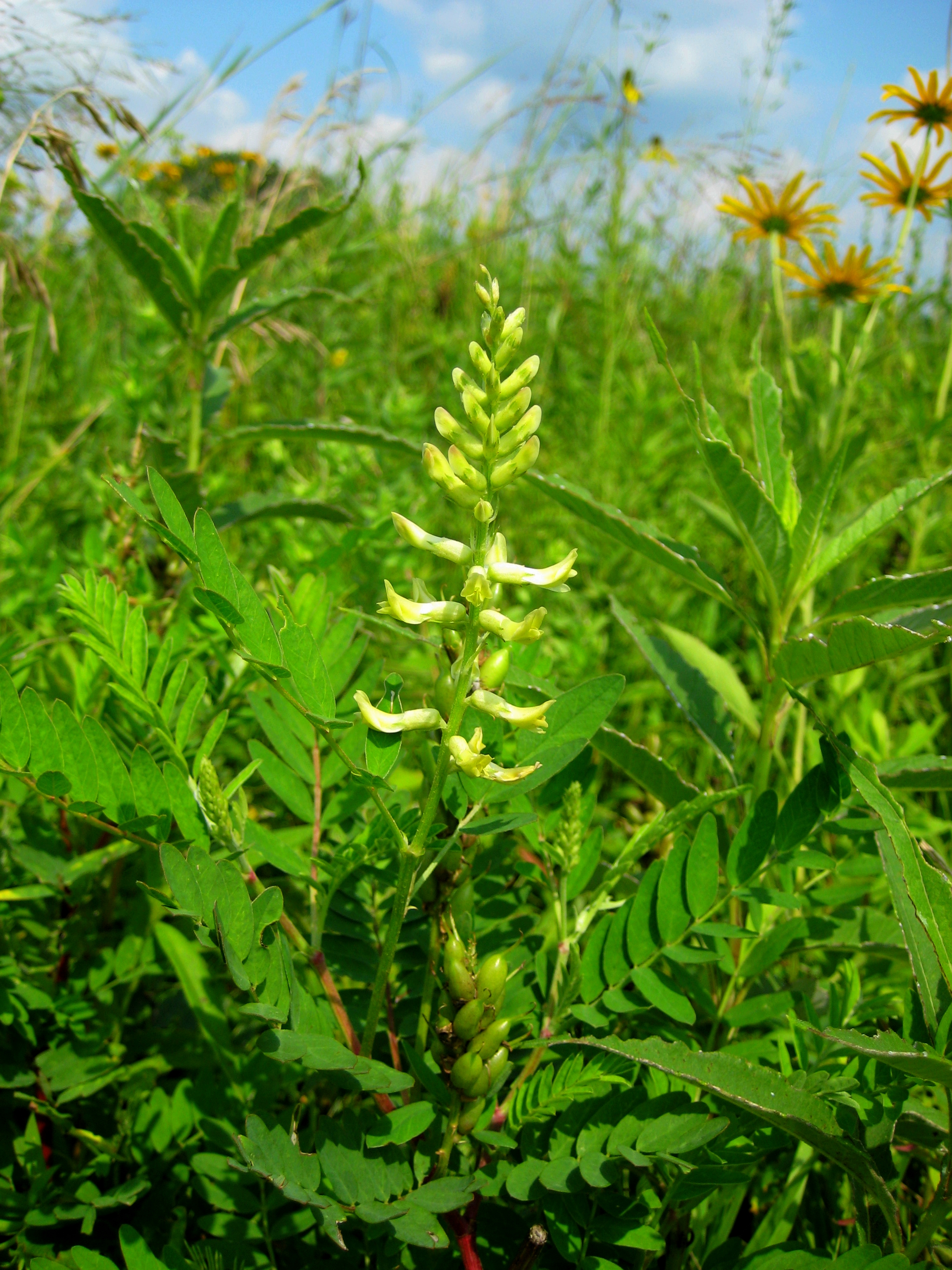
With seedpods and blooms
