= Swainsonine =

Names
- Preferred IUPAC name (1S,2R,8R,8aR)-Octahydroindolizine-1,2,8-triol
- Other names Tridolgosir

Identifiers
CAS Number	72741-87-8
3D model (JSmol)	Interactive image
ChEBI	CHEBI:9367
ChEMBL	ChEMBL371197
ChemSpider	46788
DrugBank	DB02034
ECHA InfoCard	100.123.531
KEGG	C10173
PubChem CID	51683
UNII	RSY4RK37KQ
CompTox Dashboard (EPA)	DTXSID5046356
- InChI: InChI=1S/C8H15NO3/c10-5-2-1-3-9-4-6(11)8(12)7(5)9/h5-8,10-12H,1-4H2/t5-,6-,7-,8-/m1/s1 Key: FXUAIOOAOAVCGD-WCTZXXKLSA-N; InChI=1/C8H15NO3/c10-5-2-1-3-9-4-6(11)8(12)7(5)9/h5-8,10-12H,1-4H2/t5-,6-,7-,8-/m1/s1 Key: FXUAIOOAOAVCGD-WCTZXXKLBP; InChI=1S/C8H15NO3/c10-5-2-1-3-9-4-6(11)8(12)7(5)9/h5-8,10-12H,1-4H2/t5-,6-,7-,8-/m1/s1 Key: FXUAIOOAOAVCGD-WCTZXXKLSA-N
- SMILES: C1C[C@H]([C@@H]2[C@@H]([C@@H](CN2C1)O)O)O

Properties
Chemical formula	C_{8}H_{15}NO_{3}
Molar mass	173.2
Melting point	143 to 144 °C (289 to 291 °F; 416 to 417 K)
Solubility in water	10 mg/1 mL
- Except where otherwise noted, data are given for materials in their standard state (at 25 °C [77 °F], 100 kPa). verify (what is ?) Infobox references

Swainsonine is an indolizidine alkaloid. It is a potent inhibitor of Golgi alpha-mannosidase II, an immunomodulator, and a potential chemotherapy drug. As a toxin in locoweed (likely its primary toxin) it also is a significant cause of economic losses in livestock industries, particularly in North America. It was first isolated from Swainsona canescens.

== Pharmacology ==
Swainsonine inhibits glycoside hydrolases, specifically those involved in N-linked glycosylation. Disruption of Golgi alpha-mannosidase II with swainsonine induces hybrid-type glycans. These glycans have a Man5GlcNAc2 core with processing on the 3-arm that resembles so-called complex-type glycans.

The pharmacological properties of this product have not been fully investigated.

== Sources ==
Some plants, such as Oxytropis ochrocephala, do not produce the toxic compound themselves, but are host to endophytic fungi which produces swainsonine, such as Alternaria oxytropis.

Fungal Sources
Family	Fungi
Pleosporaceae	Undifilum oxytropis
Clavicipitaceae	Metarhizium anisopliae

Plant sources
Family	Plants
Fabaceae	Swainsona canescens, Astragalus earlei, A. mollissimus, A. pubentissimus, A. lentiginosis, A. wootoni, A. nothoxys, A. tephrodes, A. humistratus
Convolvulaceae	Jacquemontia corymbulosa, Ipomoea verbascoidea, I. subincana, I. megapotamica, I. rosea, I. carnea, I. sericophylla, I. riedelii

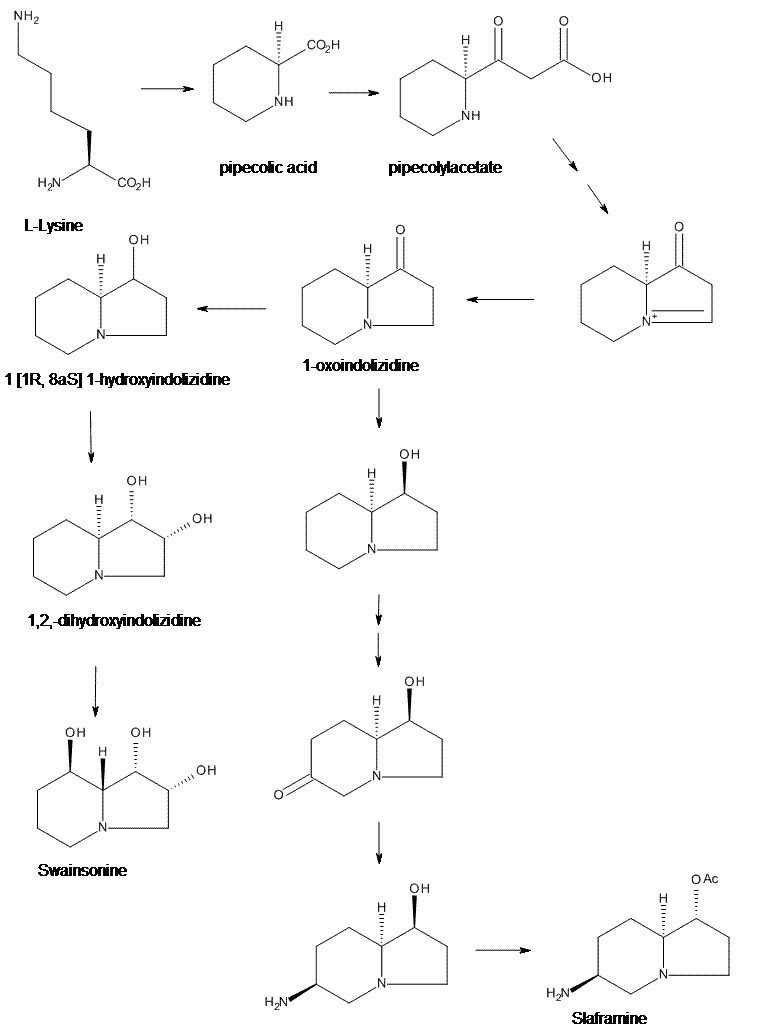
Swainsonine biosynthesis scheme

== Biosynthesis ==
The biosynthesis of swainsonine has been investigated in the fungus Rhizoctonia leguminicola, and it initially involves the conversion of lysine into pipecolic acid. The pyrrolidine ring is then formed via retention of the carbon atom of the pipecolate's carboxyl group, as well as the coupling of two more carbon atoms from either acetate or malonate to form a pipecolylacetate. The retention of the carboxyl carbon is striking, since it is normally lost in the biosynthesis of most other alkaloids.

The resulting oxoindolizidine is then reduced to (1R,8aS)- 1-hydroxyindolizidine, which is subsequently hydroxylated at the C2 carbon atom to yield 1,2-dihydroxyindolizidine. Finally, an 8-hydroxyl group is introduced through epimerization at C-8a to yield swainsonine. Schneider et al. have suggested that oxidation occurs at C-8a to give an iminium ion. Reduction from the β face would then yield the R configuration of swainsonine, as opposed to the S configuration of slaframine, another indolizidine alkaloid whose biosynthesis is similar to that of swainsonine during the first half of the pathway and also shown above alongside that of swainsonine. The instance at which oxidation and reduction occur with regard to the introduction of the hydroxyl groups at the C2 and C8 positions is still under investigation.

The biosynthetic pathway of swainsonine has also been investigated in the Diablo locoweed (Astragalus oxyphysus). Through detection of (1,8a-trans)-1-hydroxyindolizidine and (1,8a-trans-1,2-cis)-1,2-dihydroxyindolizidine—two precursors of swainsonine in the fungus pathway—in the shoots of the plant, Harris et al. proposed that the biosynthetic pathway of swainsonine in the locoweed is nearly identical to that of the fungus.

== Synthesis ==
Despite the small size of swaisonine, the synthesis of this molecule and its analogues is quite challenging due to the presence of four chiral centers. In most cases, synthesis implies the use of sugars, chiral aminoacids as starting compounds, or chiral catalysts to induce chirality.The swainsonine synthesis was systemazed by three common precursors: 8-oxy-hexahydroindolizines, N-protected-3-oxy-2-substituted-piperidines and 2-substituted-pyrrolidine-3,4-protected-diols.

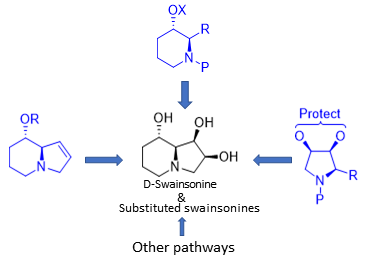
Swainsonine synthesis from common precursors

== Livestock losses ==
Because chronic intoxication with swainsonine causes a variety of neurological disorders in livestock, these plant species are known collectively as locoweeds. Other effects of intoxication include reduced appetite and consequent reduced growth in young animals and loss of weight in adults, and cessation of reproduction (loss of libido, loss of fertility, and abortion).

== Potential uses ==
Swainsonine has a potential for treating cancers such as glioma and gastric carcinoma. However, a phase II clinical trial of GD0039 (a hydrochloride salt of swainsonine) in 17 patients with renal carcinoma was discouraging. Swainsonine's activity against tumors is attributed to its stimulation of macrophages.

Swainsonine also has potential uses as an adjuvant for anti-cancer drugs and other therapies in use. In mice, swainsonine reduces the toxicity of doxorubicin, suggesting that swainsonine might enable use of higher doses of doxorubicin. Swainsonine may promote restoration of bone marrow damaged by some types of cancer treatments.

== Molecular mechanism ==
The inhibitory effect of swainsonine on Golgi Mannosidase II (GMII) was proposed to be due to its ability to bind in the GMII binding pocket in a similar fashion as the natural GMII substrate in its transition state. Later, it was shown that the binding pattern of the swainsonine molecule resembles that of the Michaelis complex of mannose and only the protonated, charge positive swainsonine molecule binds similarly to the substrate in its transition state. The actual state in which swainsonine binds in the mannosidase remains undetermined and is most likely dependent on the pH at which the enzyme operates.

== See also ==
- Castanospermine
- Mannosidosis
