= Mannosyl-oligosaccharide 1,3-1,6-alpha-mannosidase =

Mannosyl-oligosaccharide 1,3-1,6-α-mannosidase

Identifiers
- EC no.: 3.2.1.114
- CAS no.: 82047-77-6
- Alt. names: mannosidase II, exo-1,3-1,6-α-mannosidase, α-D-mannosidase II, α-mannosidase II, α-3,6-mannosidase, GlcNAc transferase I-dependent α1,3[α1,6]mannosidase, Golgi α-mannosidase II, ManII, 1,3(1,6)-α-D-mannosidase, 1,3-(1,6-)mannosyl-oligosaccharide α-D-mannohydrolase

Databases
- IntEnz: IntEnz view
- BRENDA: BRENDA entry
- ExPASy: NiceZyme view
- KEGG: KEGG entry
- MetaCyc: metabolic pathway
- PRIAM: profile
- PDB structures: RCSB PDB PDBe PDBsum
Search
- PMC: articles
- PubMed: articles
- NCBI: proteins

Mannosyl-oligosaccharide 1,3-1,6-α-mannosidase, also known as Golgi α-mannosidase II, is an enzyme with systematic name (1→3)-(1→6)-mannosyl-oligosaccharide α-D-mannohydrolase. It catalyses the hydrolysis of the terminal (1→3)- and (1→6)-linked α-D-mannose residues in the mannosyl-oligosaccharide Man_{5}(GlcNAc)_{3}.

This enzyme is involved in the synthesis of glycoproteins. It is a key enzyme of N-linked glycan processing and is inhibited by small molecule swainsonine.
