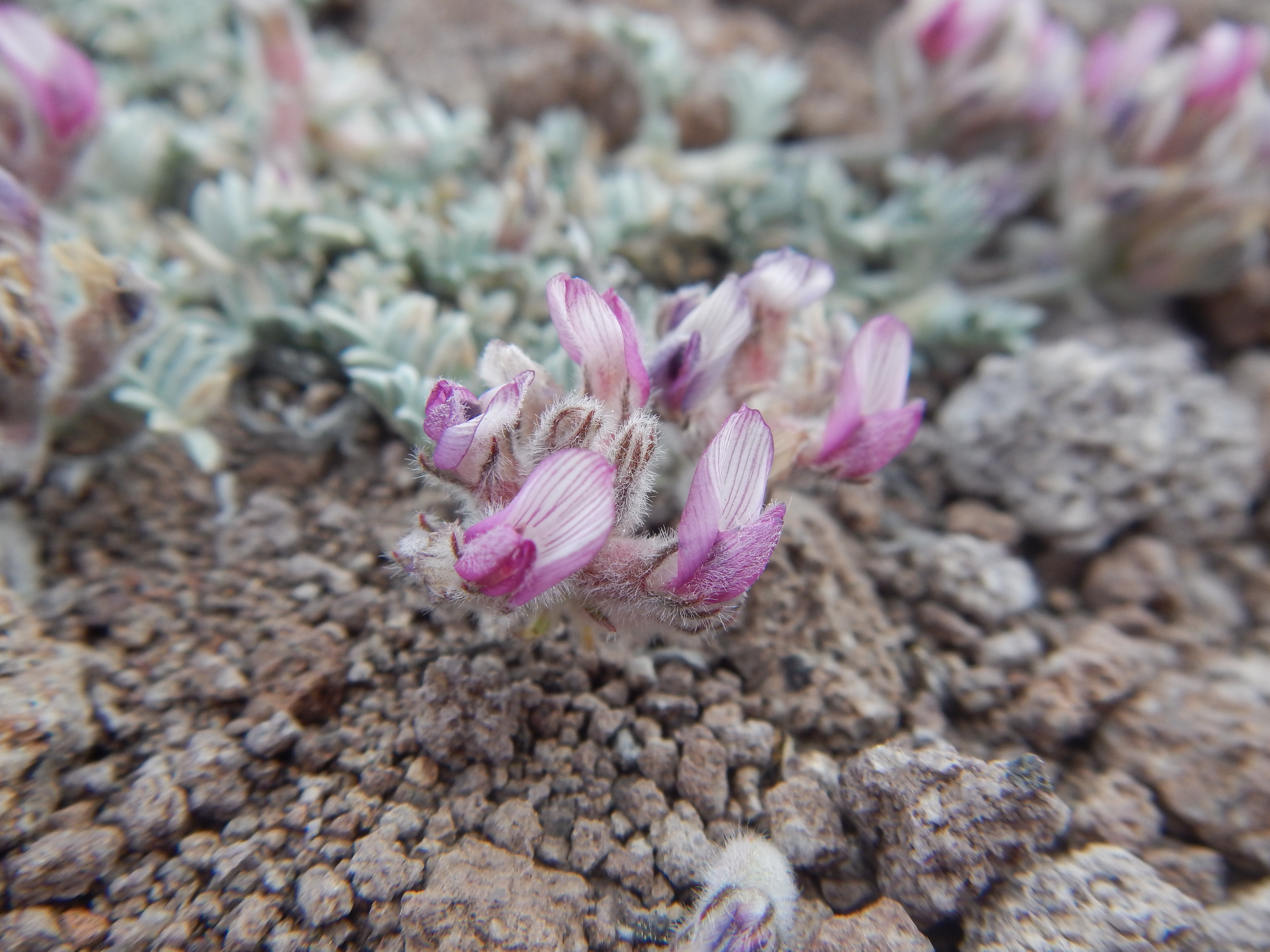

Conservation status
- Imperiled (NatureServe)

Scientific classification
- Kingdom: Plantae
- Clade: Tracheophytes
- Clade: Angiosperms
- Clade: Eudicots
- Clade: Rosids
- Order: Fabales
- Family: Fabaceae
- Subfamily: Faboideae
- Genus: Astragalus
- Species: A. austiniae

Binomial name
- Astragalus austiniae A.Gray ex W.H.Brewer & S.Wats.

= Astragalus austiniae =

Austin's milkvetch

Species of legume

Astragalus austiniae is a species of milkvetch known by the common name Austin's milkvetch. It is native to the Sierra Nevada of California and Nevada in the vicinity of Lake Tahoe. It is a plant of the alpine climate of the high mountains, where it tolerates exposed areas.

== Description ==
Astragalus austiniae is a dwarfed perennial herb forming small clumps in the rock litter no taller than about 11 centimeters. Stems and foliage are coated densely in cottony, silvery hairs. The leaves are up to 5 centimeters long and are made up of several keeled oval-shaped leaflets. The inflorescence is a woolly headlike cluster of 4 to 14 pink or purple-tinted white pealike flowers each around a centimeter long.

The fruit is a woolly legume pod less than a centimeter long.
