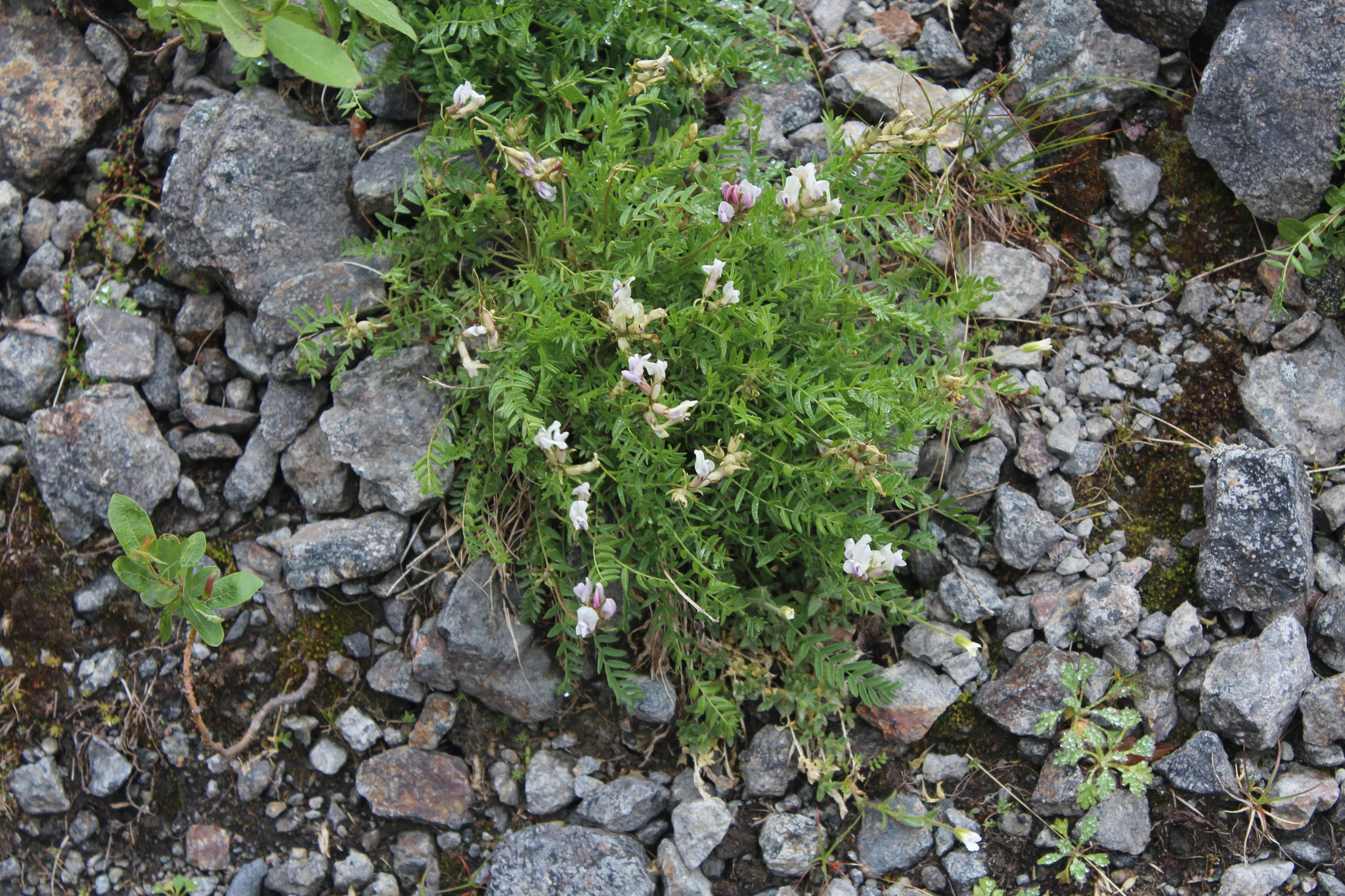

Scientific classification
- Kingdom: Plantae
- Clade: Tracheophytes
- Clade: Angiosperms
- Clade: Eudicots
- Clade: Rosids
- Order: Fabales
- Family: Fabaceae
- Subfamily: Faboideae
- Genus: Oxytropis
- Species: O. sordida

Binomial name
- Oxytropis sordida (Willd.) Pers.

= Oxytropis sordida =

Species of flowering plant

Oxytropis sordida is a species of flowering plant belonging to the family Fabaceae.

Its native range is Northern and Eastern Europe to Northern Russian Far East and Mongolia.
