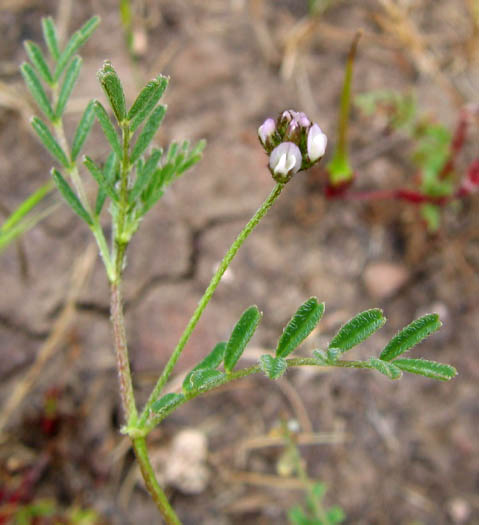
- var. didymocarpus

Conservation status
- Least Concern (IUCN 3.1)

Scientific classification
- Kingdom: Plantae
- Clade: Tracheophytes
- Clade: Angiosperms
- Clade: Eudicots
- Clade: Rosids
- Order: Fabales
- Family: Fabaceae
- Subfamily: Faboideae
- Genus: Astragalus
- Species: A. didymocarpus

Binomial name
- Astragalus didymocarpus Hook. & Arn.

= Astragalus didymocarpus =

Species of legume

Astragalus didymocarpus is a species of milkvetch known by the common names Dwarf white milkvetch and Two-seeded milkvetch. It is native to the southwestern United States and northern Mexico, where it can be found in many types of habitat.

== Description ==
Astragalus didymocarpus is a slender, hairy annual herb growing erect to about 30 cm (12 in) tall, drooping, or flat on the ground in a spreading clump. The leaves are up to 7 to 8 cm (2.8 to 3.1 in) long and are made up of narrow to oblong leaflets. The inflorescence is a cluster of up to 30 purple-tinted white flowers, each under 1 cm (0.39 in) long. The inflorescence is covered in long black and white hairs.

The fruit is a small, spherical legume pod which dries to a stiff papery texture.

=== Varieties ===
There are several varieties of Astragalus didymocarpus:

- A. d. var. didymocarpus - erect herb found in western Nevada and much of California
- A. d. var. dispermus - prostrate form native to the desert regions
- A. d. var. milesianus (Miles' milkvetch) - rare variety found only along the Central Coast of California
- A. d. var. obispoensis - form with ascending stems native to coastal southern California and Baja California

== Ecology ==
In the Mojave Desert, Astragalus didymocarpus is foraged on by desert tortoises (Gopherus agassizii) and is a significant part of their diet.
