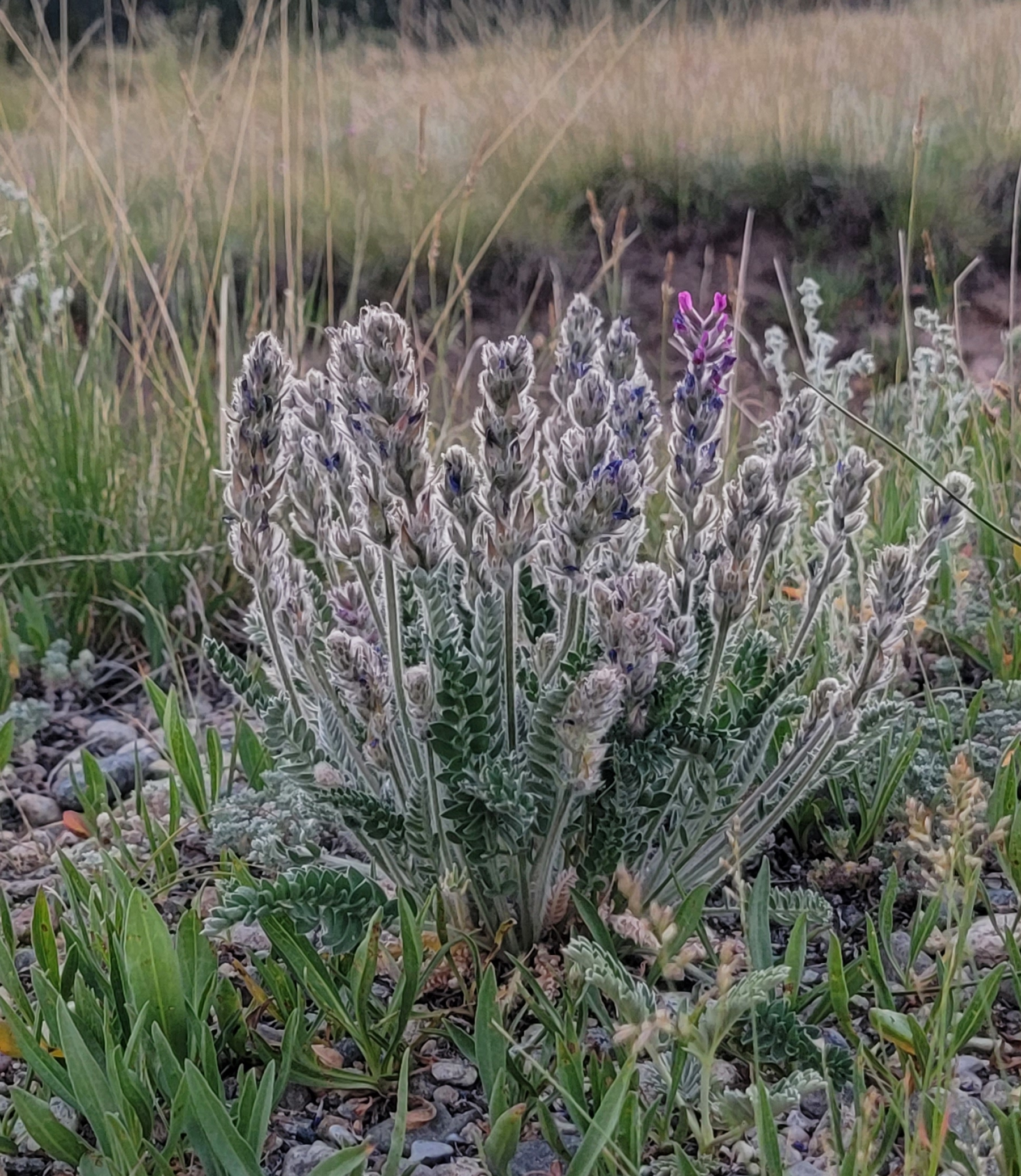

Conservation status
- Secure (NatureServe)

Scientific classification
- Kingdom: Plantae
- Clade: Tracheophytes
- Clade: Angiosperms
- Clade: Eudicots
- Clade: Rosids
- Order: Fabales
- Family: Fabaceae
- Subfamily: Faboideae
- Genus: Oxytropis
- Species: O. splendens

Binomial name
- Oxytropis splendens Douglas

Synonyms
- List: Aragallus caudatus Greene (1899); Aragallus galioides Greene (1905); Aragallus richardsonii (Hook.) Greene (1899); Aragallus splendens (Douglas) Greene (1897); Astragalus splendens var. richardsonii (Hook.) Tidestr. (1937); Astragalus splendens (Douglas) Tidestr. (1937); Oxytropis caudata (Greene) K.Schum. (1901); Oxytropis micans Bunge (1874); Oxytropis oxyphylla Richardson (1823); Oxytropis richardsonii (Hook.) K.Schum. (1901); Oxytropis splendens f. nelsonii Gand. (1902); Oxytropis splendens var. richardsonii Hook. (1831); Oxytropis splendens f. strigosa Gand. (1902); Oxytropis splendens var. vestita Hook. (1831); Spiesia splendens (Douglas) Kuntze (1891)

= Oxytropis splendens =

Species of plant

Oxytropis splendens, commonly known as showy locoweed, is a flowering perennial in the legume family endemic to the east slope of the Rocky Mountains. Growing in Canada, Alaska, several Great Plains states, and parts of the Mountain West, O. splendens grows well in harsh alpine ecosystems, allowing it to quickly colonize gravel and coal spoils.

== Description ==
This plant is tufted with silvery, silky-hairy, leafless stems. When in bloom, it grows dense spikes of rich lavender flowers, rising from among pinnately compound basal leaves. It has a lifespan of 3-5 years, blooming every year from late-June to mid-August. It produces small brown seeds. The plant's flowers are favored by many varieties of bumblebees.

== Distribution and habitat ==
Widely distributed in the mountains and foothills in Alberta. Alaska, Yukon, District of Mackenzie, to Lake Superior, south to southeastern British Columbia, New Mexico, North Dakota, northern Minnesota, and Colorado. It favors grassy slopes, open woods, clearings, gravelly river flats, banks, and roadsides. O. splendens is an early colonizer of disturbed gravel areas and unamended coal spoils. Its nitrogen fixing properties and quick colonizing of poor soils make it a favorable plant for revegetation.

== Toxicity ==
It is potentially toxic, as it contains toxic alkaloids and takes up selenium.
