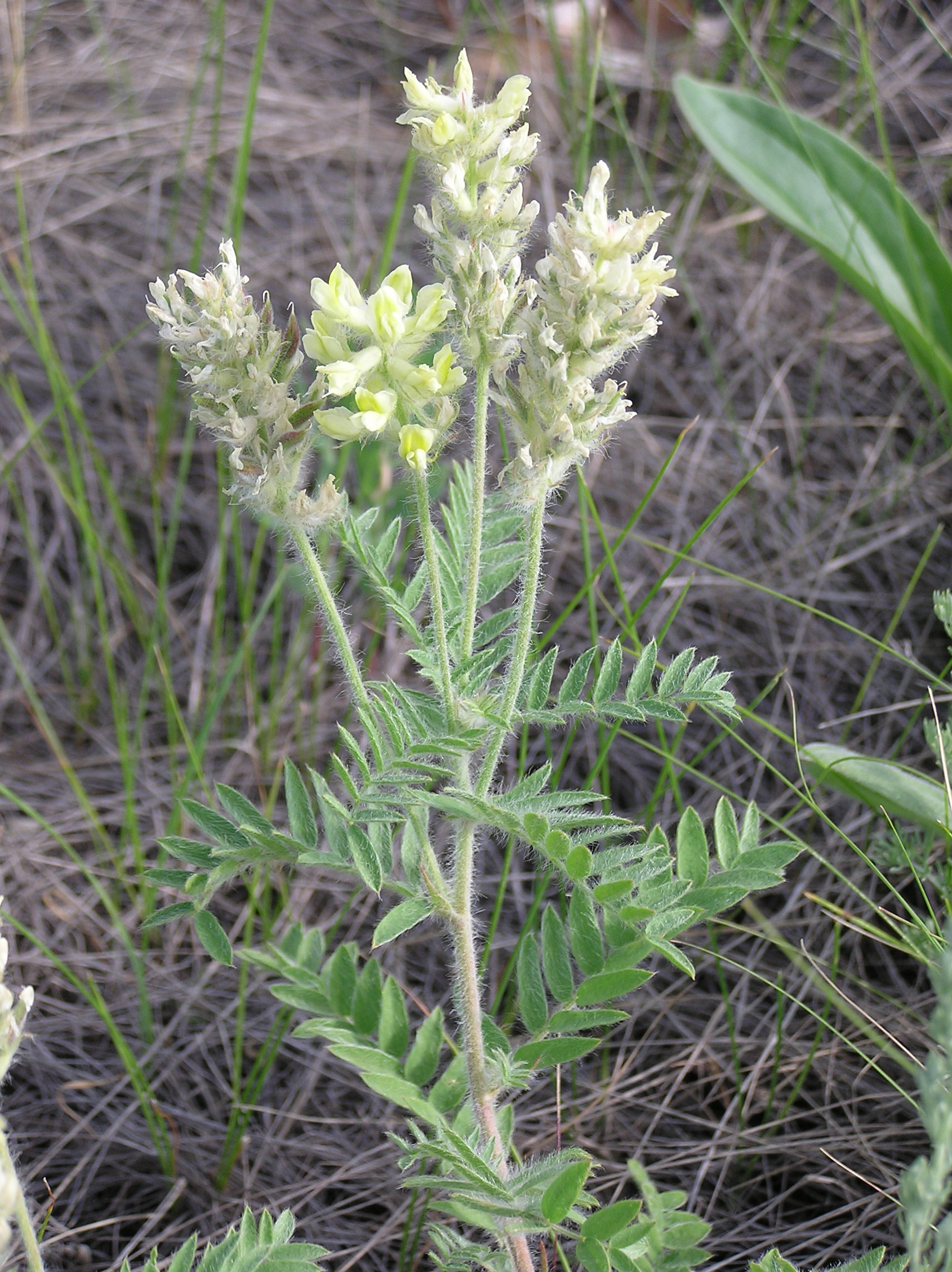

Scientific classification
- Kingdom: Plantae
- Clade: Tracheophytes
- Clade: Angiosperms
- Clade: Eudicots
- Clade: Rosids
- Order: Fabales
- Family: Fabaceae
- Subfamily: Faboideae
- Genus: Oxytropis
- Species: O. pilosa

Binomial name
- Oxytropis pilosa (L.) DC.

= Oxytropis pilosa =

Species of flowering plant

Oxytropis pilosa is a species of flowering plant in the legume family and the Faboideae subfamily, found in Central Europe and Eastern Europe as far as Russia. It is a rare and protected plant, and flowers from June to August.
