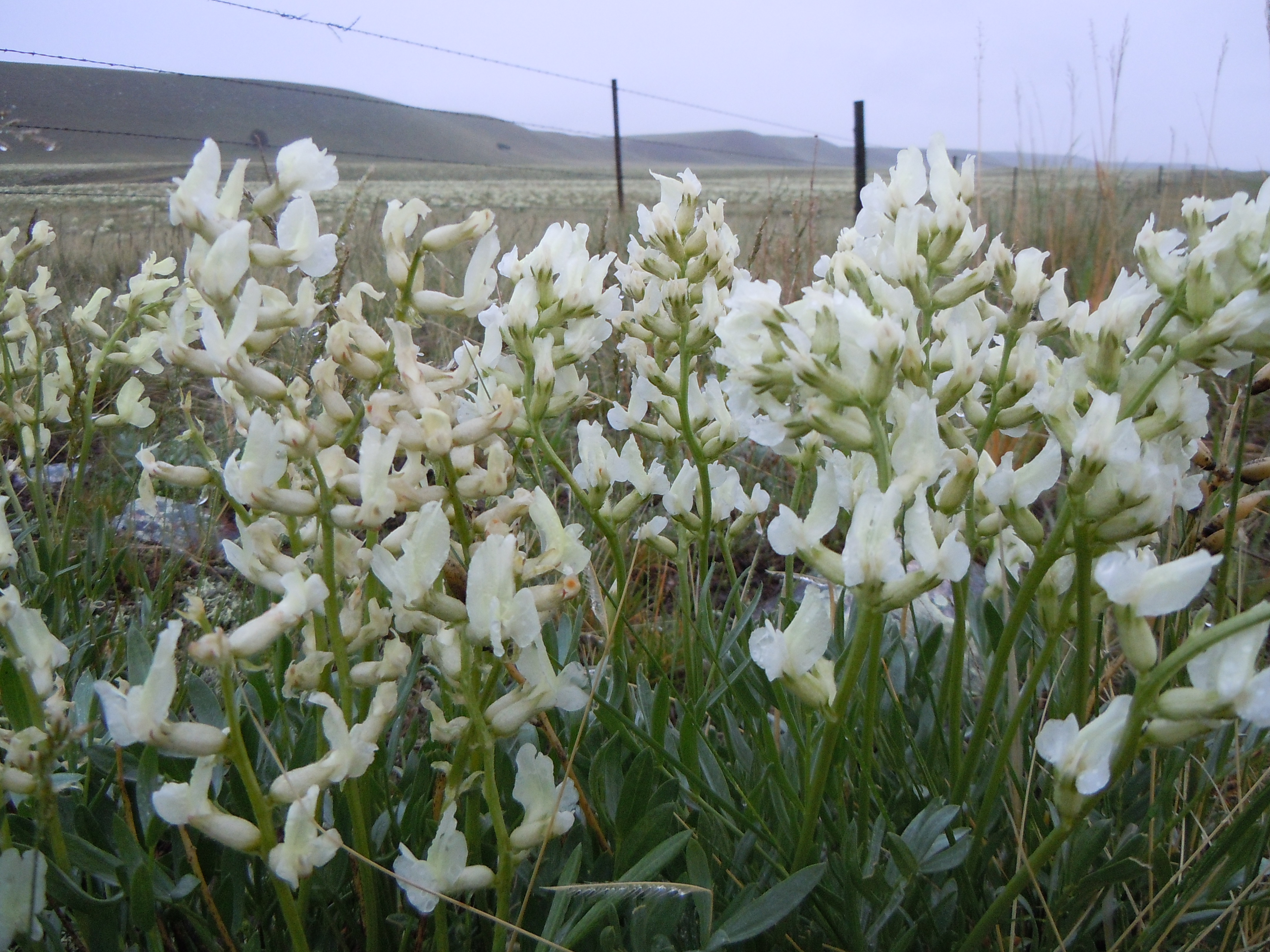

Conservation status
- Secure (NatureServe)

Scientific classification
- Kingdom: Plantae
- Clade: Tracheophytes
- Clade: Angiosperms
- Clade: Eudicots
- Clade: Rosids
- Order: Fabales
- Family: Fabaceae
- Subfamily: Faboideae
- Genus: Oxytropis
- Species: O. sericea

Binomial name
- Oxytropis sericea Nutt.

Varieties
- Oxytropis sericea var. sericea; Oxytropis sericea var. speciosa (Torr. & A.Gray) S.L.Welsh

Synonyms
- List: Aragallus lambertii var. sericeus (Nutt.) A.Nelson (1899); Aragallus sericeus (Nutt.) Greene (1897); Oxytropis lambertii var. sericea (Nutt.) A.Gray (1884); Spiesia lambertii var. sericea (Nutt.) Rydb. (1894)

= Oxytropis sericea =

Plant species in the pea family

Oxytropis sericea is a species of flowering plant in the legume family known by the common names white locoweed, white point-vetch, whitepoint crazyweed, and silky crazyweed. It is native to western North America from Yukon and British Columbia south through the Pacific Northwest, the Rocky Mountains, and the Great Plains.

This plant is a perennial herb growing up to about 30 centimetres (12 inches) in maximum height. It grows from a long taproot. The leaves are up to 20 cm (7.9 in) long. One plant may produce several flowering stalks, each with up to 27 flowers. The fruit is a legume pod up to 2.5 cm (0.98 in) long containing many hairy, leathery, kidney-shaped seeds. The tough seeds can remain dormant in a soil seed bank for a long time. This helps the species survive stress conditions such as cold, exposure, and desiccation. This is often one of the first plants to grow up in the spring.

The plant may occur in a wide variety of habitat types, including those in subalpine and alpine climates. It may occur at 3,708 metres (12,165 feet) in elevation in Colorado. It easily takes hold on rangeland that has been disturbed, and in mature, climax plant communities.

This plant, a species of locoweed, is a common cause of poisoning in livestock in North America. Locoweed poisoning is "the most widespread poisonous plant problem in the western United States." Locoweeds cause locoism, a disease state resulting from chronic neurological damage. Symptoms of locoism include depression, blindness, loss of coordination, emaciation, tremors, paralysis, constipation, deterioration of the coat, decreased libido, abortion, seizures, and death. It may also predispose cattle to high mountain brisket disease, a type of congestive heart failure. The toxic agent in the plant is swainsonine, an alkaloid. Animals affected include cattle, sheep, horses, goats, and wildlife such as elk and mule deer. Horses are very susceptible to the poisoning, and do not recover from locoism. Cattle, sheep, and horses find the plant palatable and even preferable to other forages, even when grass is readily available. They may become chemically addicted to the plant. Cattle tend to prefer the flowers and fruits of the plants, which contain higher levels of swainsonine than the leaves. One to three months of heavy exposure can cause death.
