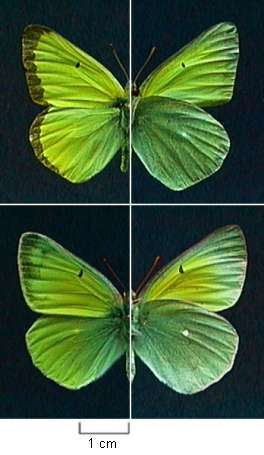

Conservation status
- Apparently Secure (NatureServe)

Scientific classification
- Kingdom: Animalia
- Phylum: Arthropoda
- Clade: Pancrustacea
- Class: Insecta
- Order: Lepidoptera
- Family: Pieridae
- Genus: Colias
- Species: C. alexandra

Binomial name
- Colias alexandra W.H. Edwards, 1863

Synonyms
- Eurymus alexandra Dyar, 1903

= Colias alexandra =

Species of butterfly

Colias alexandra, the Queen Alexandra's sulphur, Alexandra sulphur, or ultraviolet sulfur, is a butterfly in the family Pieridae found in western North America. Its range includes Alaska to the Northwest Territories and south to Arizona and New Mexico.

== Description ==
Wingspan is from 38 to 57 mm. In the male above similar to Colias philodice, but has more glossy yellow ground colour with orange-yellow tinge, particularly on the hindwing. The under surface, however, is very different in both sexes, namely silver grey on the hindwing with silvery median spot. The female is light yellow, has a small dark distal margin to the forewing or none at all, but black median spot, and is sometimes suffused with orange yellow.

== Biology ==
Flight period is from mid-May until August.

Larvae feed on Thermopsis, Astragalus, Lathyrus, Oxytropis, and Lupinus species.

== Subspecies ==
Listed alphabetically:

- C. a. alexandra (Utah, Wyoming, Colorado, Montana, South Dakota, Nebraska, Alberta, Saskatchewan)
- C. a. apache Ferris, 1988 (Arizona, New Mexico)
- C. a. columbiensis Ferris, 1973 (British Columbia, Alberta, Washington, Idaho, Montana)
- C. a. edwardsii Edwards, 1870 (Nevada, California, Oregon, Idaho, Washington)

== Taxonomy ==
Colias alexandra and Colias christina have in the past been considered conspecific. Ferris recognized them as separate species in studies, based on geographic distribution, habitat preferences, female wing pattern, and male ultraviolet wing patterns. Colias alexandra is also closely related to, and sympatric with, Colias occidentalis.
