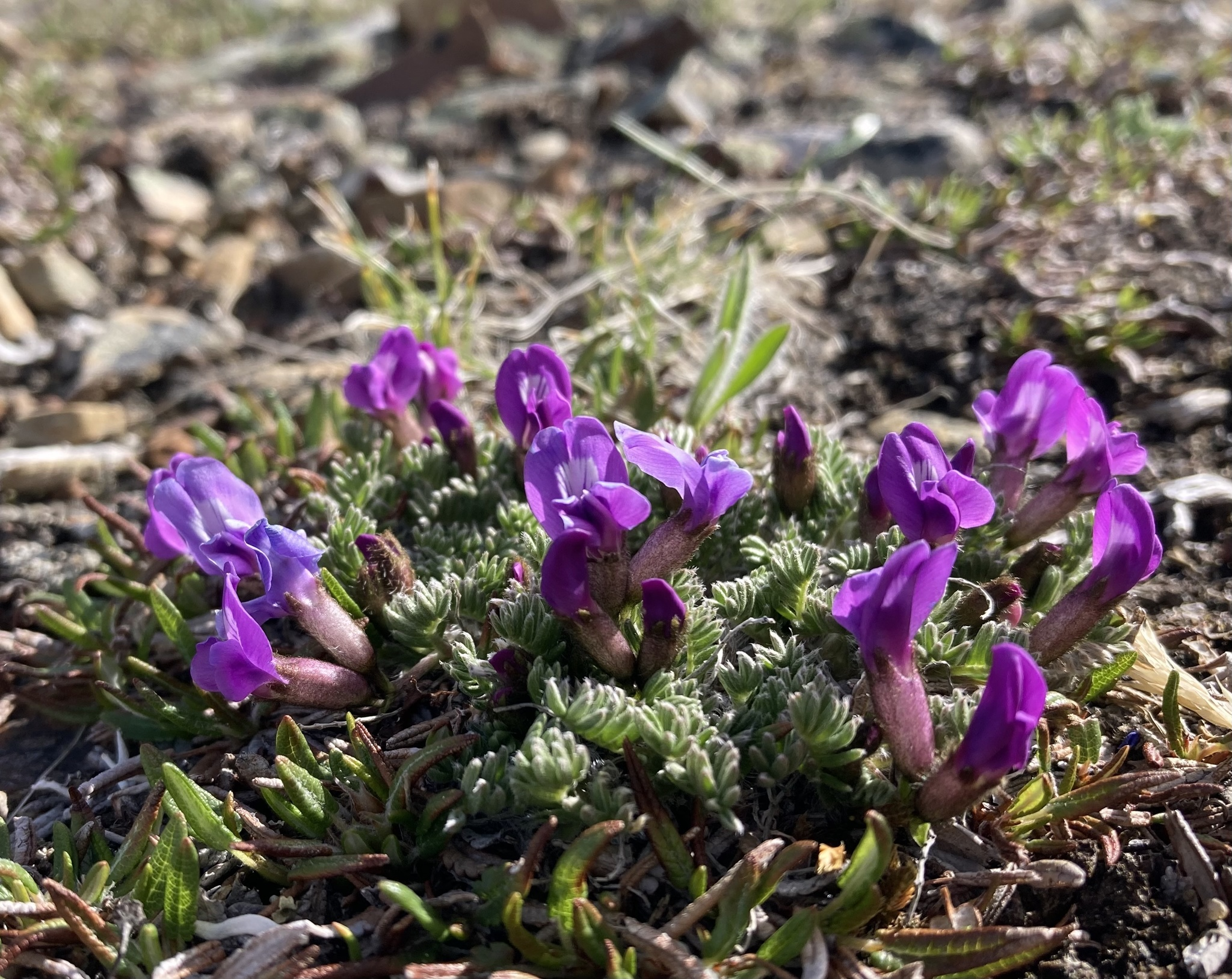

Conservation status
- Apparently Secure (NatureServe)

Scientific classification
- Kingdom: Plantae
- Clade: Tracheophytes
- Clade: Angiosperms
- Clade: Eudicots
- Clade: Rosids
- Order: Fabales
- Family: Fabaceae
- Subfamily: Faboideae
- Genus: Oxytropis
- Species: O. podocarpa

Binomial name
- Oxytropis podocarpa A.Gray

Synonyms
- List: Aragallus podocarpus (A.Gray) A.Nelson (1909); Aragallus hallii (Bunge) Rydb. (1906); Aragallus inflatus (Hook.) A.Nelson (1899); Astragalus septentrionalis Tidestr. (1937); Oxytropis arctica var. inflata Hook. (1831); Oxytropis hallii Bunge (1874); Oxytropis inflata (Hook.) Steffen (1938); Oxytropis multiceps A.Gray ex Bunge (1874); Oxytropis podocarpa var. inflata (Hook.) B.Boivin (1967); Spiesia campestris (L.) Kuntze (1891); Spiesia hallii (Bunge) Kuntze (1891); Spiesia inflata (Hook.) Britton (1894); Spiesia podocarpa (A.Gray) Kuntze (1891); Tragacantha campestris (L.) Kuntze (1891)

= Oxytropis podocarpa =

Plant species in the pea family

Oxytropis podocarpa is a species of flowering plant in the legume family known by the common names stalkpod locoweed, stalked-pod crazyweed, and Gray's point-vetch. It is native to North America, where it occurs in the northern latitudes, from Yukon and British Columbia across the low arctic to northern Quebec and Labrador. In the Rocky Mountains it occurs at the higher elevations as far south as Colorado.

This plant is a matted, cushion-forming perennial herb with erect or prostrate stems just a few centimeters long. The leaves are up to 5 centimeters long and are each made up of several leaflets. The herbage is coated in silvery gray hairs. The inflorescence is a raceme of one or two purple or blue-violet flowers. Flowering occurs in June. The fruit is a papery, inflated, hairy, black legume pod up to 2.5 centimeters long.

This is a plant of arctic habitat types such as tundra. The northernmost record is from Southampton Island in the Canadian Arctic Archipelago. To the south in the Rocky Mountains it occurs in alpine climates in meadows and barren mountain habitat. In Colorado it occurs at elevations up to 4030 meters (12,500 feet).
