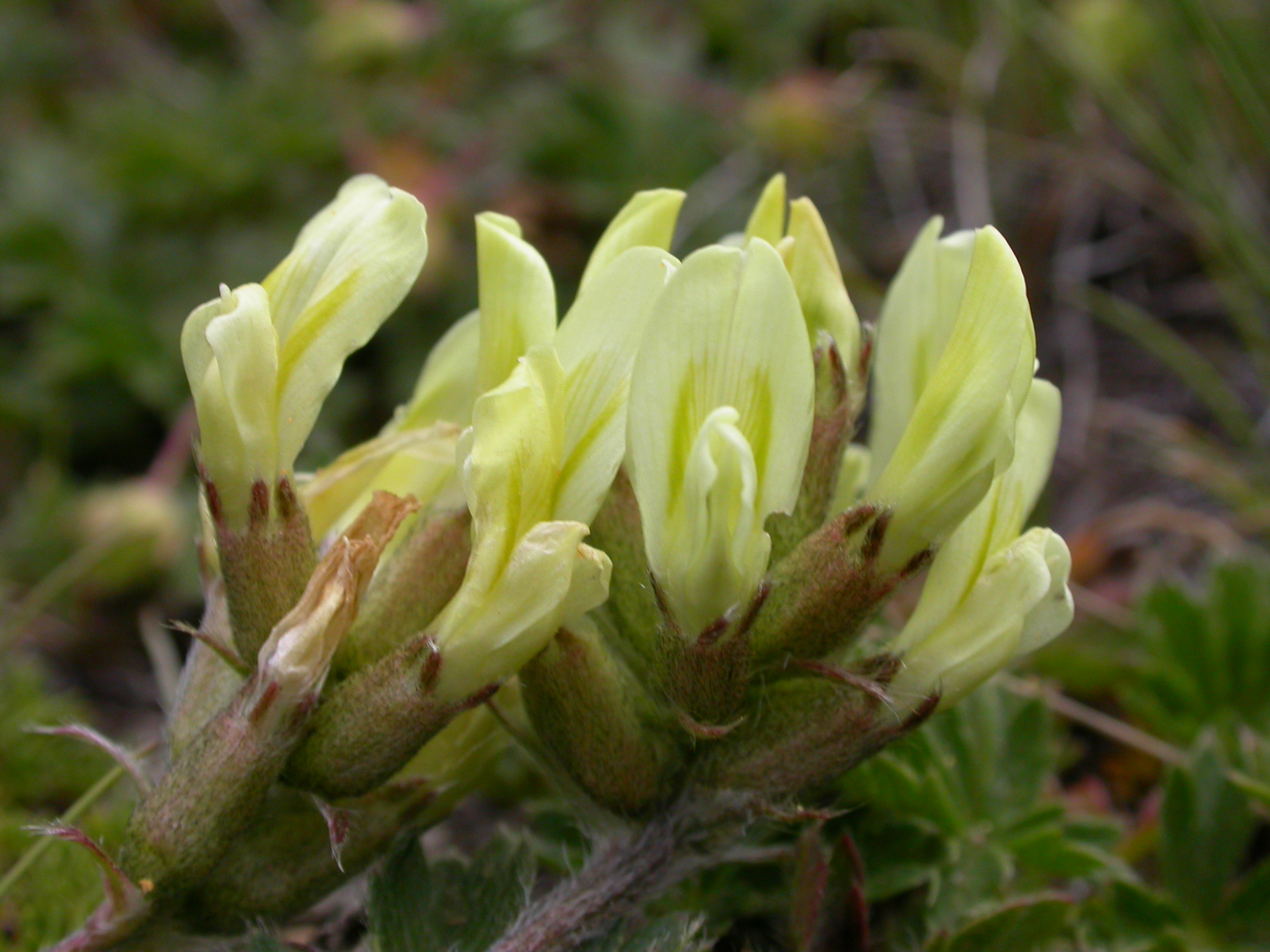

Conservation status
- Secure (NatureServe)

Scientific classification
- Kingdom: Plantae
- Clade: Tracheophytes
- Clade: Angiosperms
- Clade: Eudicots
- Clade: Rosids
- Order: Fabales
- Family: Fabaceae
- Subfamily: Faboideae
- Genus: Oxytropis
- Species: O. campestris

Binomial name
- Oxytropis campestris (L.) DC.

Subspecies and varieties
- List: Oxytropis campestris subsp. campestris; Oxytropis campestris var. chartacea (Fassett) Barneby; Oxytropis campestris var. columbiana (H.St.John) Barneby; Oxytropis campestris var. cusickii (Greenm.) Barneby; Oxytropis campestris var. davisii S.L.Welsh; Oxytropis campestris var. dispar (A.Nelson) Barneby; Oxytropis campestris var. johannensis Fernald; Oxytropis campestris var. jordalii (A.E.Porsild) S.L.Welsh; Oxytropis campestris var. kintyrica P.D.Sell; Oxytropis campestris var. minor (Hook.) S.L.Welsh; Oxytropis campestris var. perthensis P.D.Sell; Oxytropis campestris subsp. rishiriensis (Matsum.) Toyok.; Oxytropis campestris var. roaldii (Ostenf.) S.L.Welsh; Oxytropis campestris var. scotica (Jalas) P.D.Sell; Oxytropis campestris var. spicata Hook.; Oxytropis campestris subsp. tatrae (Borbás) Dostál; Oxytropis campestris subsp. tiroliensis (Sieber ex Fritsch) Leins & Merxm.; Oxytropis campestris var. varians (Britton & Rydb.) Barneby; Oxytropis campestris var. wanapum Joyal

Synonyms
- List: Aragallus campestris (L.) Greene (1897); Astragalus campestris L. (1753); Phaca campestris (L.) Wahlenb. (1813); Spiesia campestris (L.) Kuntze (1891); Tragacantha campestris (L.) Kuntze (1891)

= Oxytropis campestris =

Plant species in the pea family

Oxytropis campestris, the field locoweed, is a plant native to Northern Europe, the mountains of Central and Southern Europe, the Northwestern United States and all of Canada, sometimes grown as an ornamental plant.

It is found in prairies, woods, and meadows, and prefers gravelly and rocky slopes, where it grows most abundantly. The plant has numerous variants. It is a larval host plant of the small blue butterfly

== Description ==
Oxytropis campestris blooms flowers from May to July. These are racemes that are capitate or oblong, 4 to 15 cm in length. The plants have 8 to 32 flowers that rise from a scape. The actual flowers have five lobes and form a calyx tube. They are of a cream to yellowish color, but sometimes of pink, blue, or purple, with hairs that are usually black. The keel petals are pointed, and often have purple blotches.

The plant also produces fruit which matures from July to September. These are legumes which are oblong-ovate 1.5 to 2 cm in length. They are mostly sessile and dehiscent from the tip. The fruit is membranous and contains many seeds.

The plant grows perennially, with an acaulescent forb reaching 20 to 50 cm in height and has a taproot.

Leaves grow alternately in a pinnate fashion and are usually 8 to 40 cm long. The leaves are dimorphic, with primary leaves short ovate leaflets, and secondary leaves with 11 to 33 leaflets. These secondary leaflets are 1 to 2.5 cm long.

== Toxicity ==
The Oxytropis campestris plant is poisonous and may cause loco disease in livestock. From this it derives the common name field locoweed or some other variations. However, Mountain goats eat it freely.

== Conservation ==
Though this plant is common in general, one variety, var. chartacea, is a rare taxon limited to two counties in the state of Wisconsin. It is federally listed as a threatened species of the United States.

== See also ==
- Locoweed
