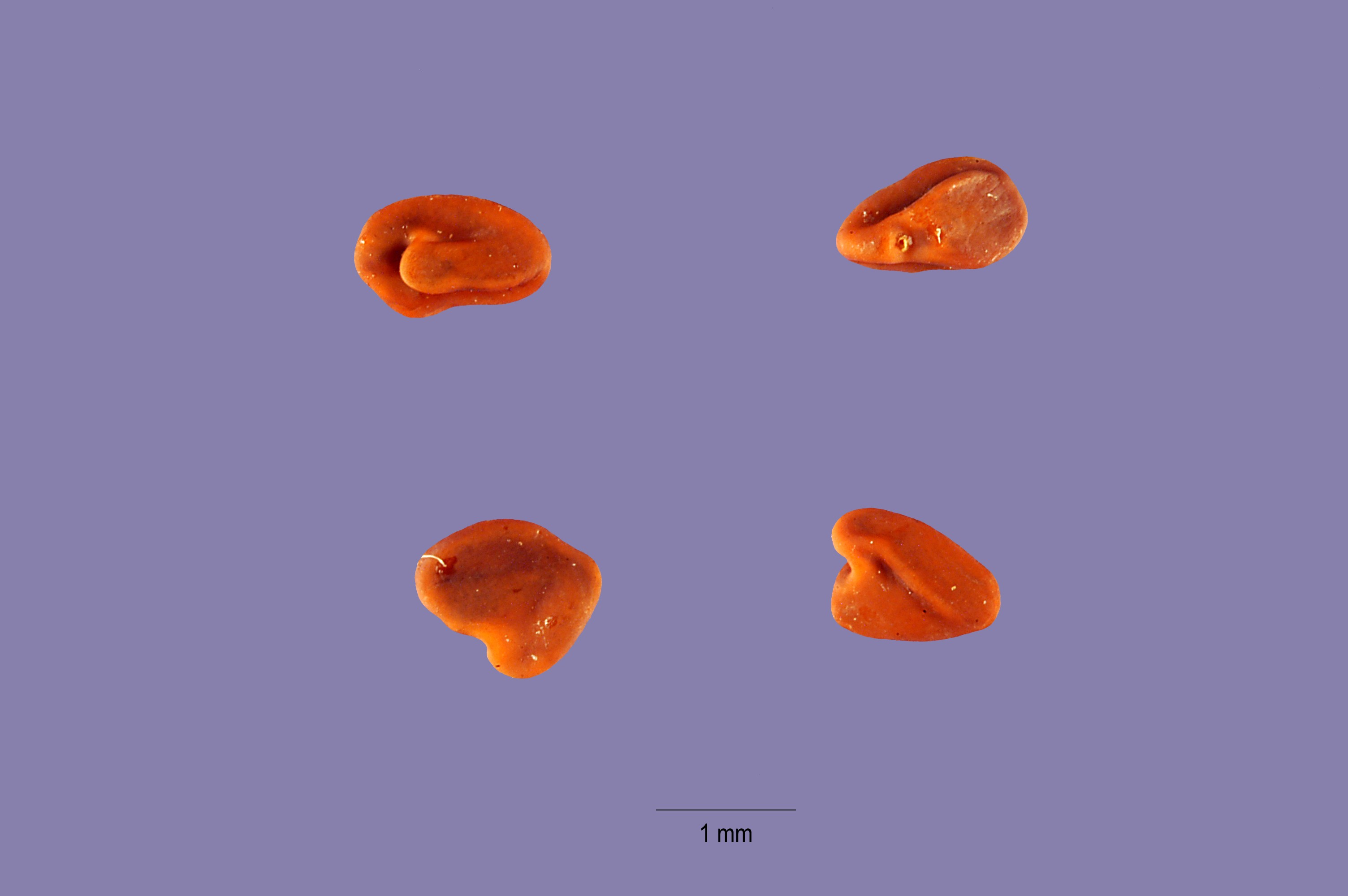

Conservation status
- Apparently Secure (NatureServe)

Scientific classification
- Kingdom: Plantae
- Clade: Tracheophytes
- Clade: Angiosperms
- Clade: Eudicots
- Clade: Rosids
- Order: Fabales
- Family: Fabaceae
- Subfamily: Faboideae
- Genus: Astragalus
- Species: A. oxyphysus

Binomial name
- Astragalus oxyphysus A.Gray

= Astragalus oxyphysus =

Species of legume

Astragalus oxyphysus is a species of milkvetch known by the common name Mt. Diablo milkvetch or Stanislaus milk-vetch. It is endemic to central California, where it grows in dry grassland and scrub habitat in the Central Valley and the adjacent Inner Coast Ranges and Sierra Nevada foothills.

== Description ==
Astragalus oxyphysus is a robust perennial herb forming clumps of erect, leafy stems up to 80 centimeters tall. Leaves are up to 17 centimeters long and are made up of many lance-shaped leaflets. The plant flowers in large inflorescences of up to 65 flowers each.

The individual flower is cream-colored and at least 2 centimeters long. The fruit is a hanging legume pod up to 4 centimeters long. It is inflated but narrow and dries to a thin, almost transparent papery texture.
