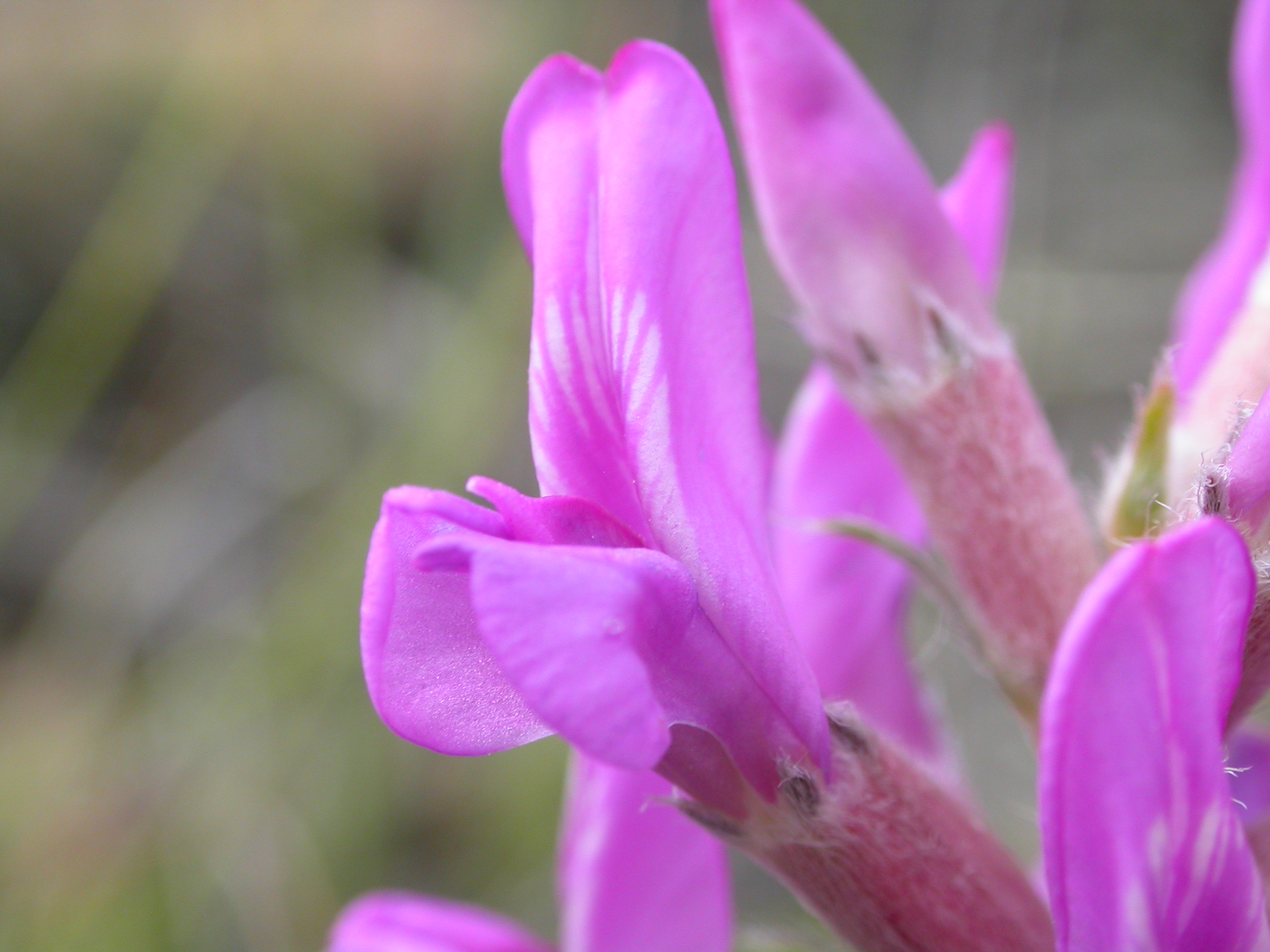

Conservation status
- Secure (NatureServe)

Scientific classification
- Kingdom: Plantae
- Clade: Embryophytes
- Clade: Tracheophytes
- Clade: Spermatophytes
- Clade: Angiosperms
- Clade: Eudicots
- Clade: Rosids
- Order: Fabales
- Family: Fabaceae
- Subfamily: Faboideae
- Genus: Oxytropis
- Species: O. lambertii

Binomial name
- Oxytropis lambertii Pursh

Varieties
- Oxytropis lambertii var. articulata (Greene) Barneby; Oxytropis lambertii var. bigelovii A.Gray; Oxytropis lambertii var. lambertii

Synonyms
- Aragallus lambertii (Pursh) Greene (1897); Spiesia lambertii (Pursh) Kuntze (1891)

= Oxytropis lambertii =

Plant species in the pea family

Oxytropis lambertii commonly known as purple locoweed, Colorado locoweed, Lambert's crazy weed, or Lambert’s Locoweed is a species of flowering plant in the legume family.

== Distribution ==
It is native to grasslands in the Canadian Prairie of central Canada and in the mid-west and Great Plains of the United States from Texas to Manitoba and west to Arizona and Montana.

== Description ==
Oxytropis lambertii is a perennial herb producing a patch of basal leaves around the root crown, and several showy erect inflorescences. The leaf is compound with several silvery-green leaflets. The inflorescence produces several flowers, each borne in a tubular purple or pinkish calyx of sepals covered thinly in silver hairs. The pealike flower corolla is reddish or bluish purple with a lighter patch at the base of the banner. The fruit is a cylindrical legume pod.

=== Toxic ===
The Oxytropis lambertii plant is one of the locoweeds most frequently implicated in livestock poisoning. The toxin is called swainsonine. Research suggests that the plant itself may not be toxic, but becomes toxic when inhabited by endophytic fungi of the genus Embellisia, which produce swainsonine.

== See also ==
- Locoweed
