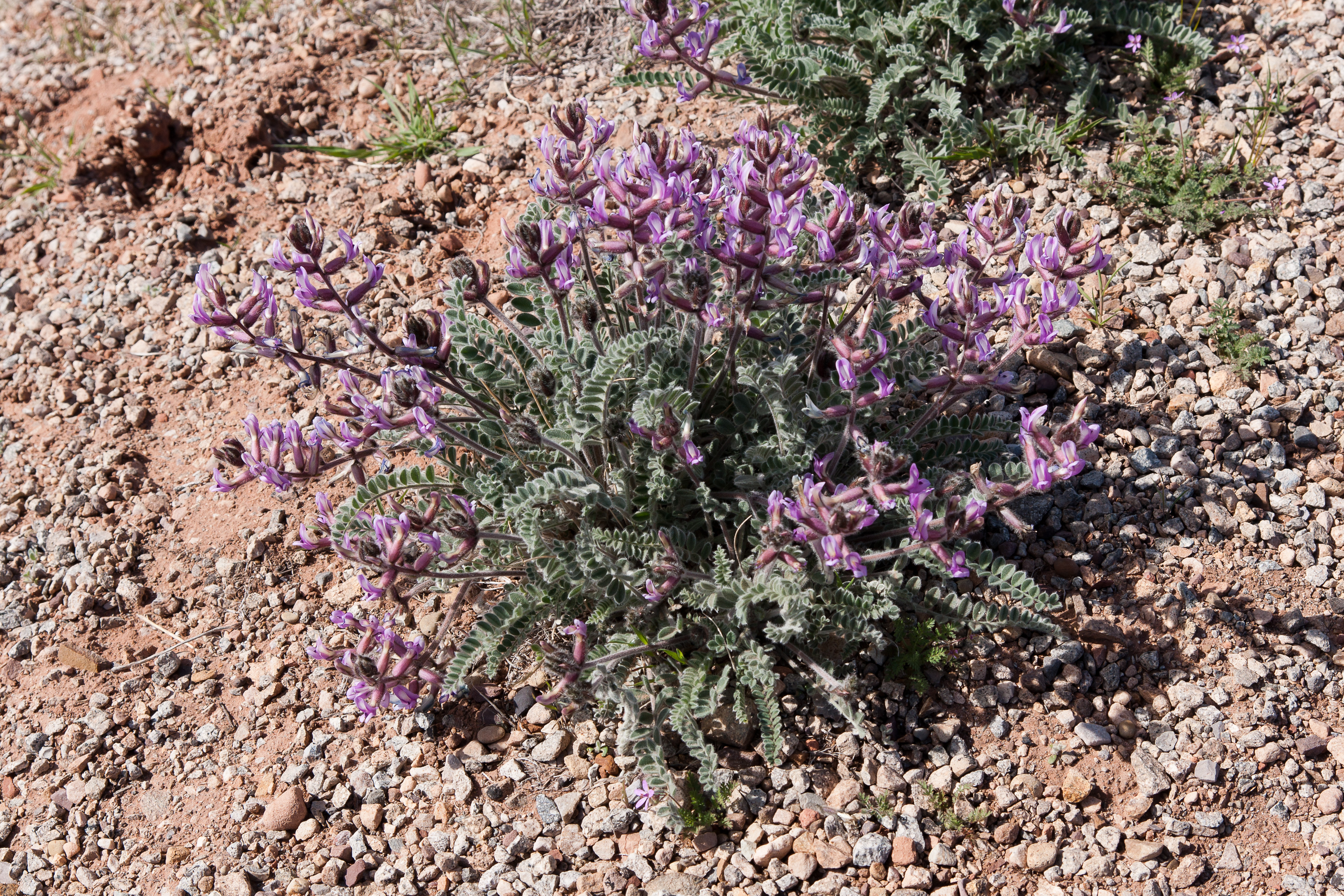

Conservation status
- Secure (NatureServe)

Scientific classification
- Kingdom: Plantae
- Clade: Tracheophytes
- Clade: Angiosperms
- Clade: Eudicots
- Clade: Rosids
- Order: Fabales
- Family: Fabaceae
- Subfamily: Faboideae
- Genus: Astragalus
- Species: A. mollissimus

Binomial name
- Astragalus mollissimus Torr.

= Astragalus mollissimus =

Species of legume

Astragalus mollissimus (common name - wooly locoweed) is a perennial plant in the legume family (Fabaceae) found in the Colorado Plateau and Canyonlands region of the southwestern United States.

== Description ==
=== Growth pattern ===
It is hairy a perennial plant growing from 2 to 34 inches (5.1 to 86.4 cm) tall, from a very short stem.

=== Leaves and stems ===
It has hairy stems and leaves. "Mollissumus" means "most soft", referring to the hairy covering of the leaves and stems. Pinnate leaves are from 3/4 to 11 inches (1.9 to 27.9 cm) long, with 15–35 elliptical to oval wooly leaflets.

=== Inflorescence and fruit ===
It blooms from March to August. The inflorescence are from 3/4 to 10 inches (1.9 to 25.4 cm) stalks with 7–20 flowers per stalk. Each pink to purple or bicolored with white flower has a 1/4 to 1/2 inch (0.64 to 1.27 cm) hairy calyx with 5 pointed teeth, around a 3/4 inch (1.9 cm) corolla with upper petal flares at the end. The inflated seed pods are 1/3 to 1 inch (0.85 to 2.54 cm), egg shaped and hairless to densely hairy.

== Habitat and range ==
It grows from grasslands to Pinyon juniper woodland communities ranging from Wyoming to Arizona.

== Ecological and human interactions ==
The plant derives its common name from its wooly stems and leaves, and its effect on the nervous system of livestock which consume it, causing them to "go loco." This is caused by an alkaloid it contains called swainsonine, formerly known as locoine. The plant is toxic both fresh and dried, and in addition to its effects on the nervous system, can also cause congenital defects and liver damage in livestock.
