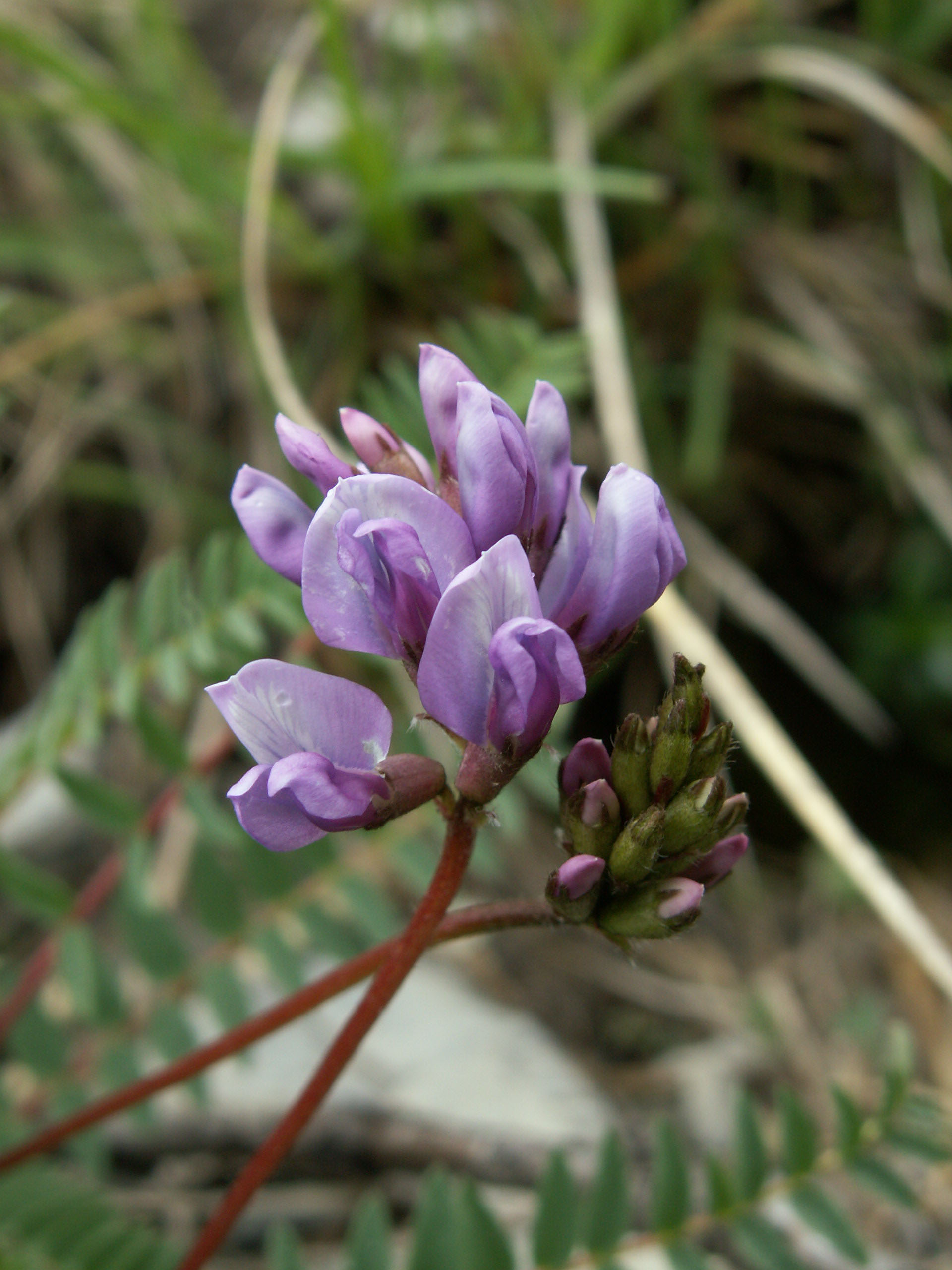
- Oxytropis jacquinii

Scientific classification
- Kingdom: Plantae
- Clade: Embryophytes
- Clade: Tracheophytes
- Clade: Angiosperms
- Clade: Eudicots
- Clade: Rosids
- Order: Fabales
- Family: Fabaceae
- Subfamily: Faboideae
- Clade: Inverted repeat-lacking clade
- Tribe: Galegeae
- Subtribe: Astragalinae
- Genus: Oxytropis; DC. (1802)

Synonyms
- Aragallus Neck. ex Greene (1897); Spiesia Neck. ex Kuntze (1891), nom. superfl.

= Oxytropis =

Genus of flowering plants in the legume family

Oxytropis is a genus of plants in the legume family. It includes over 600 species native to subarctic to temperate regions of North America and Eurasia. It is one of three genera of plants known as locoweeds, and are notorious for being toxic to grazing animals. The other locoweed genera are the closely related Astragalus, and the Australian Swainsona. Most oxtropis species are native to Eurasia and North America, but several species are native to the Arctic. These are hairy perennial plants which produce raceme inflorescences of pink, purple, white, or yellow flowers which are generally pea-like but have distinctive sharply beaked keels. The stems are leafless, the leaves being all basal. The plant produces legume pods containing the seeds.

== Selected species ==
- Oxytropis arctica – Arctic locoweed
- Oxytropis bellii
- Oxytropis borealis – boreal locoweed
- Oxytropis campestris – field locoweed
- Oxytropis deflexa – nodding locoweed
- Oxytropis halleri – purple oxytropis
- Oxytropis jacquinii
- Oxytropis kobukensis – Kobuk locoweed
- Oxytropis lambertii – purple locoweed
- Oxytropis monticola – yellow-flowered locoweed
- Oxytropis nitens
- Oxytropis ocrensis
- Oxytropis oreophila – mountain oxytrope
- Oxytropis oxyphylla
- Oxytropis parryi – Parry's locoweed
- Oxytropis pilosa
- Oxytropis podocarpa – stalkpod locoweed
- Oxytropis prenja
- Oxytropis prostrata
- Oxytropis pseudoglandulosa
- Oxytropis riparia – Oxus locoweed
- Oxytropis sericea – white locoweed
- Oxytropis sordida
- Oxytropis strobilacea
- Oxytropis todomoshiriensis
