= Žuvintas Biosphere Reserve =

Nature reserve in Lithuania

Zuvintas Biosphere Reserve Žuvinto biosferos rezervatas (Lithuanian)
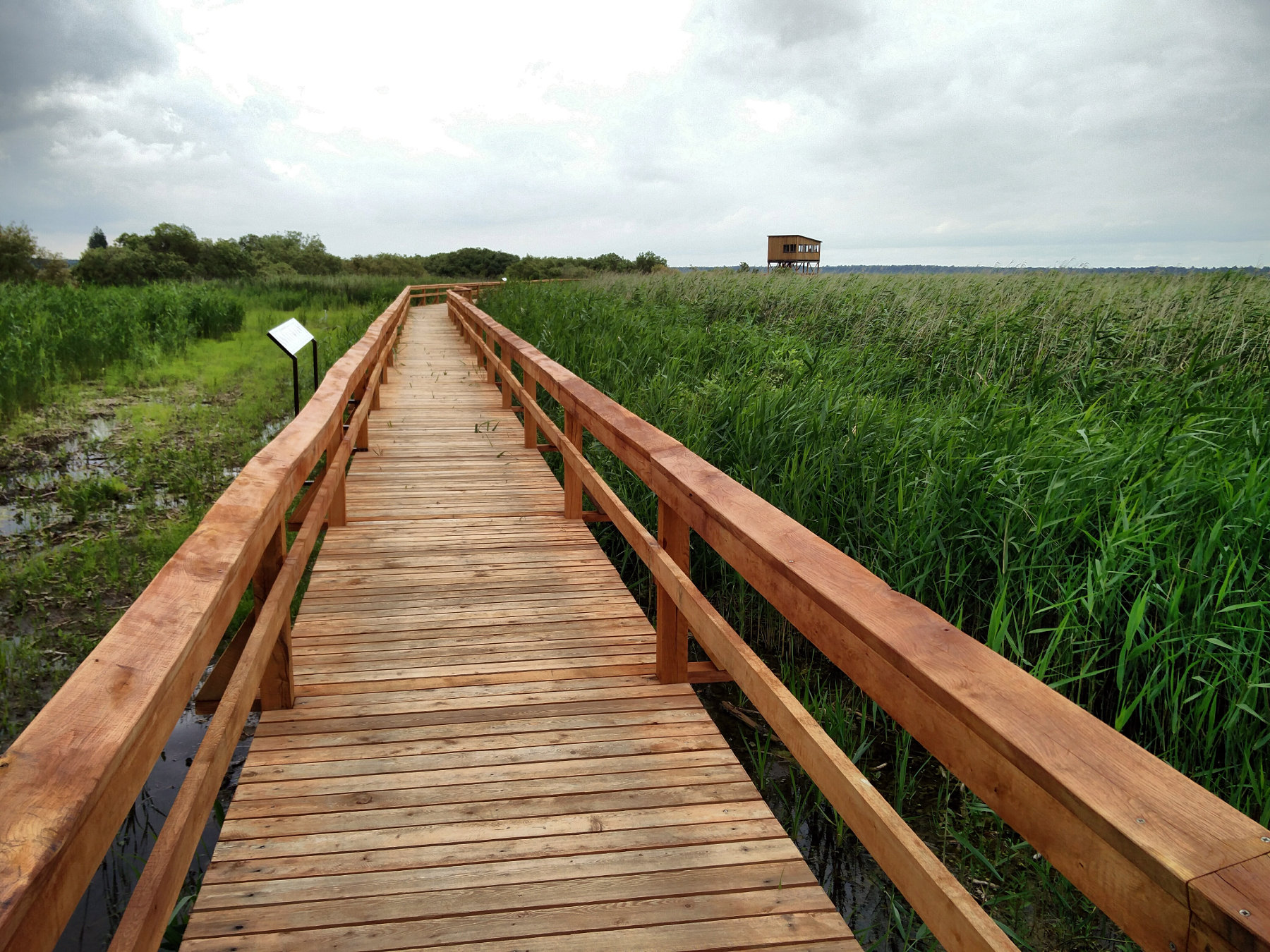
- Walkway in Zuvintas Biosphere Reserve (2020)
- Interactive map of Zuvintas Biosphere Reserve; Žuvinto biosferos rezervatas (Lithuanian)
- Location: Alytus District Municipality
- Nearest city: Alytus
- Coordinates: 54.45665°N 23.64005°E
- Area: 18,490 ha (71.4 sq mi)
Designations
Ramsar Wetland
- Official name: Zuvintas
- Designated: 4 October 1993
- Reference no.: 628

Žuvintas Biosphere Reserve (Lithuanian: Žuvinto biosferos rezervatas) is located in the south of Lithuania, in the southern part of the Middle Lithuanian Lowlands, about 30 km east of Alytus. It encompasses 18,490 ha of lakes, wetlands, mires, peatbogs and forests. This variety of habitats supports a rich biodiversity. As the largest wetland complex with a lake in Lithuania is protected by the reserve, Žuvintas Biosphere Reserve is an important place for waterfowl to nest and as a stopover during migration.

Its nature protection status dates back to 1937, it is the oldest nature protection area in Lithuania. Nominated in 2011, it is the first and only site in Lithuania recognised under UNESCO’s Man and the Biosphere Programme and added to the World Network of Biosphere Reserves.

The population of the area is about 11,000 and includes both small and large landowners.

The visitor center requires tickets that cost €4 for adults, the reduced price is €2 and it's free of charge for children under the age of 6 (2024). However, the trails are free of charge for everyone.

== Geography and climate ==
The Žuvintas Biosphere Reserve is located within Alytus and Lazdijai district municipalities in Alytus County, and in Marijampolė municipality in Marijampolė County.

Located in the southern part of the Middle Lithuanian lowlands, the site comprises Žuvintas and Amalvas wetland complexes, which formed in a depression of the limnoglacial plain surrounded by moraine hill ranges, and Bukta forest on moraine plain. Žuvintas, the largest wetland in Lithuania (6,847 ha), encompasses a swampy plain with the shallow lake Žuvintas and the surrounding floodplains. With 971 ha, the Žuvintas lake is only a small remnant of the former post-glacial lake.

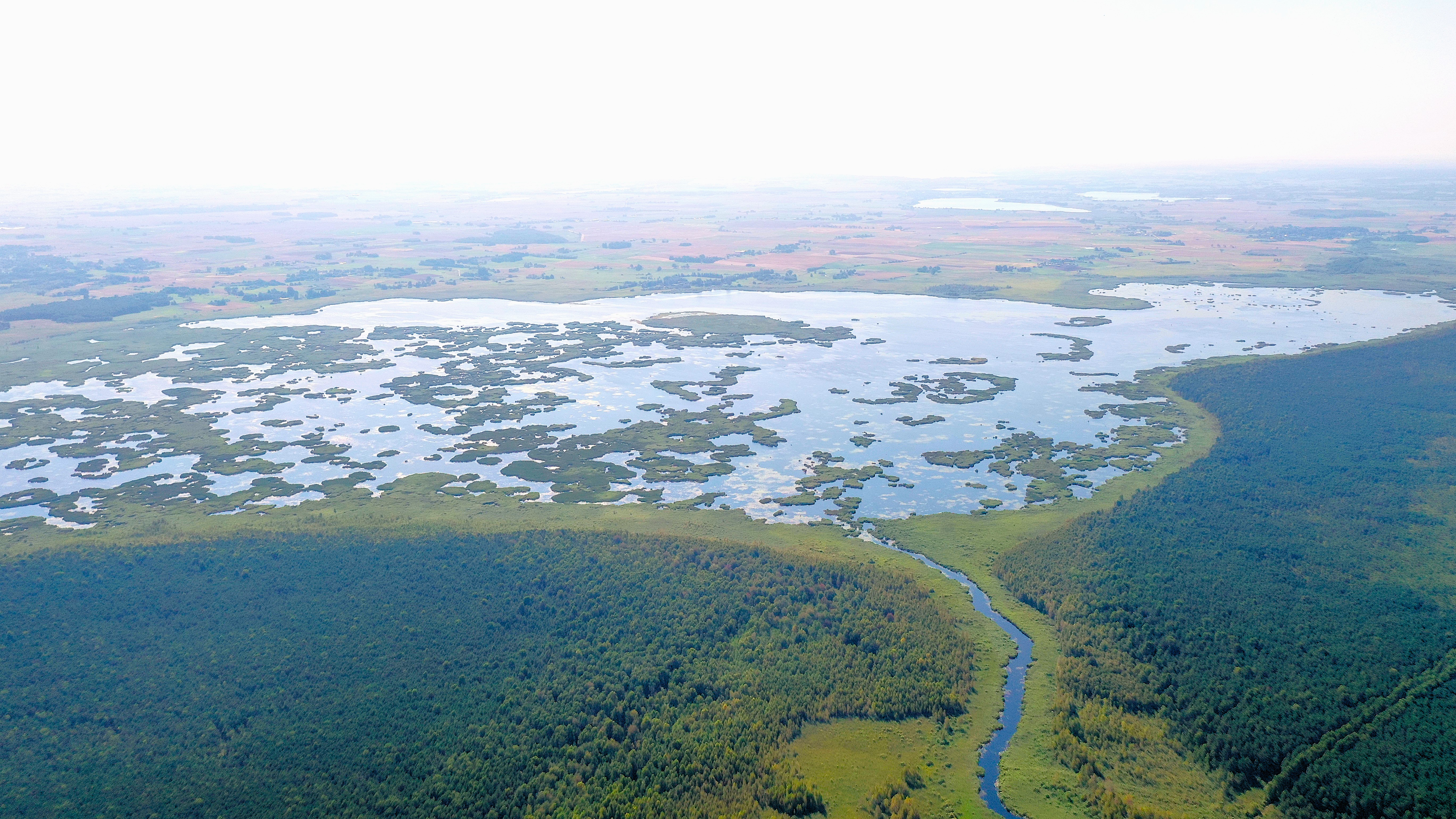
River Dovinė is the main outlet of lake Žuvintas

Its main inlets are Bambena and Kiaulycia and the river Dovinė is its main outlet. The catchment area of the Žuvintas lake (345 km^{2}) makes up more than half of the river Dovinė catchment area (589 km^{2}). Not only the Žuvintas lake, but also the Amalvas lake belongs to the Dovinė River catchment area. This lake and the Amalva mire lie to the north of Žuvintas and are similar to it, although the mire is smaller (3,414 ha). A third big lake in the reserve is Žaltytis.

The biosphere reserve is located in the climatic subarea 'Nemuno Žemupio' of Lithuania. With an average annual temperature of 7.1-7.4 °C, the subarea's temperature is similar to Lithuania's average. Compared to the previously used 1981-2010 Standard Climate Norm (SCN), the estimated average annual air temperature in Lithuania inreased by 0.5 °C, namely from 6.9 °C in 2020 (based on the 1981-2010 SCN) to 7.4 °C in 2021 (based on the 1991-2020 SCN). The warmest month is July with an average of 18.0-18.1 °C and the coldest are January and February with -3.6 °C to -3.1 °C on average. As for most extreme temperatures, the absolute minimum temperature is -31.2 °C and the absolute maximum temperature is 35.1 °C. Due to these significant seasonal temperature variations, the region has a Dfb classification, according to Köppen-Geiger Climate Classification. There are 600-640mm precipitation per year. Around 65 to 80 days of the year, there is snow and the duration of sunshine amounts 1870 hours per year. Advection of dry continental air masses makes the climate more continental and less moderated by the sea. Thus, the climate is dryer, the summers are hotter and the winters are colder than at the coast.

However, in the area of the biosphere reserve, the water drainage conditions are poor, so there are swamps and wetlands. These make the local climate more humid than is otherwise typical in the region. As a result, the weather is often foggy in spring and autumn. In summer, the wet ground warms slowly, making the weather cooler.

== Zones ==
The biosphere reserve is contiguous and, like every UNESCO biosphere reserve, consists of three zones.

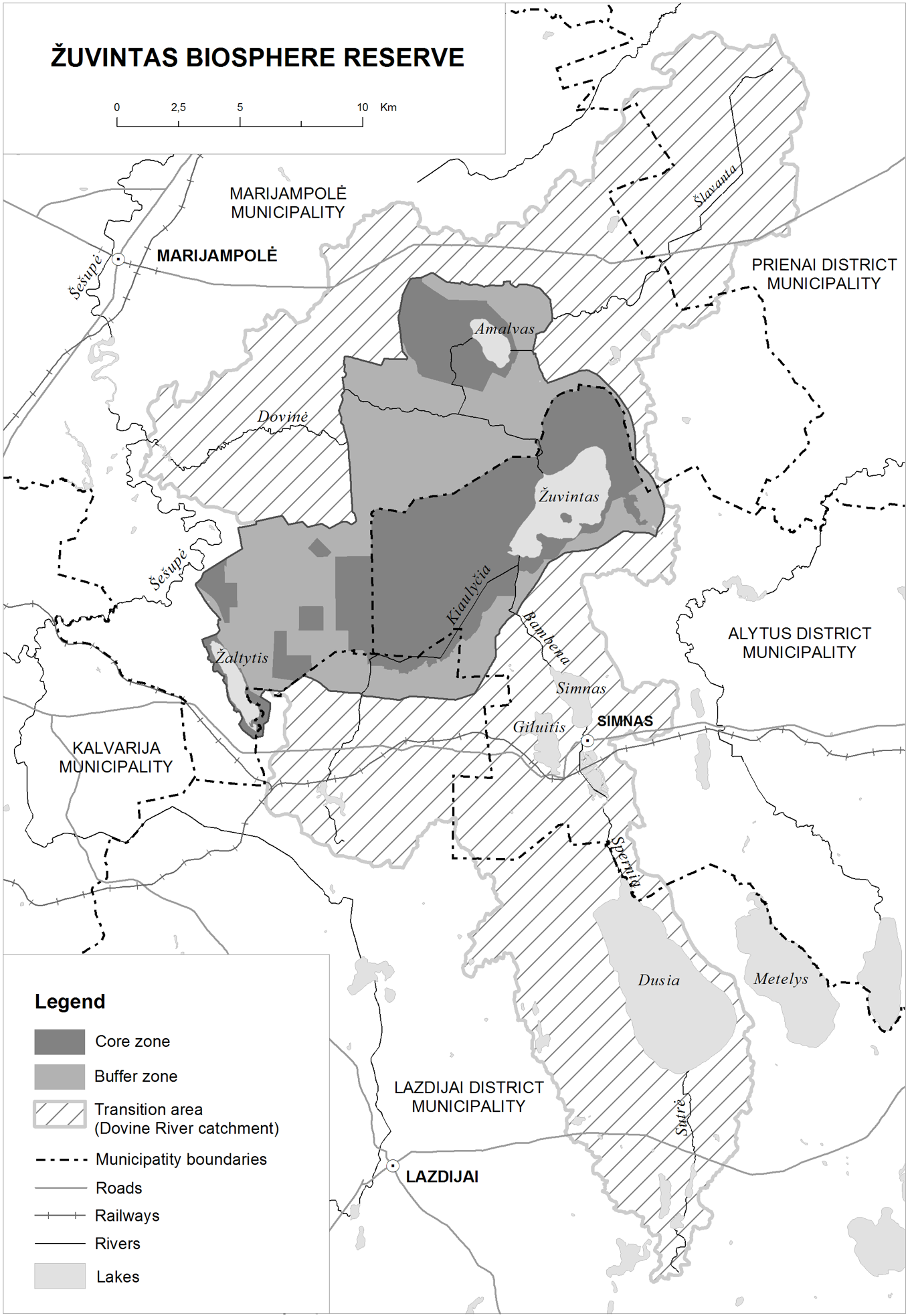
The three zones of UNESCO biosphere reserves

The strictly protected zone is called core area. A core zone contributes to the conservation of landscapes, ecosystems, species and genetic variation and therefore settlement is excluded in this area. The core area of the biosphere reserve is either strict nature reserve (IUCN category I - Žuvintas, Buktbale and Liuliškyne) or nature reserves (IUCN category IV - Amalvas, Kiaulycia, Žaltytis, Želsva, Paželsviai and Liepakojai).

The core area is surrounded by the buffer zone. There are around 1,100 inhabitants living within this zone and forestry and agriculture is allowed as long as it is compatible with sound ecological practices. Additionally this zone is especially used for ecosystem restoration, scientific research, monitoring and education.

The largest zone is the transition area. There, sustainable socio-cultural and ecological activities are particularly strongly supported.

== Nature ==
The Biosphere Reserve is characterized by a variety of different habitats, resulting in a high biodiversity. Žuvintas is inhabited by more than 4000 species of animals, plants, fungi and lichens, 137 of them are protected species (2019).

=== Flora ===
Lake Žuvintas is a typical overgrown lake. Its bottom is covered with Chara and Potamogeton species and large surface areas are dominated by aquatic plants (Nymphaea candida, Potamogeton natans, Nuphar lutea). The floating islets of Typha angustifolia are characteristic of the lake.

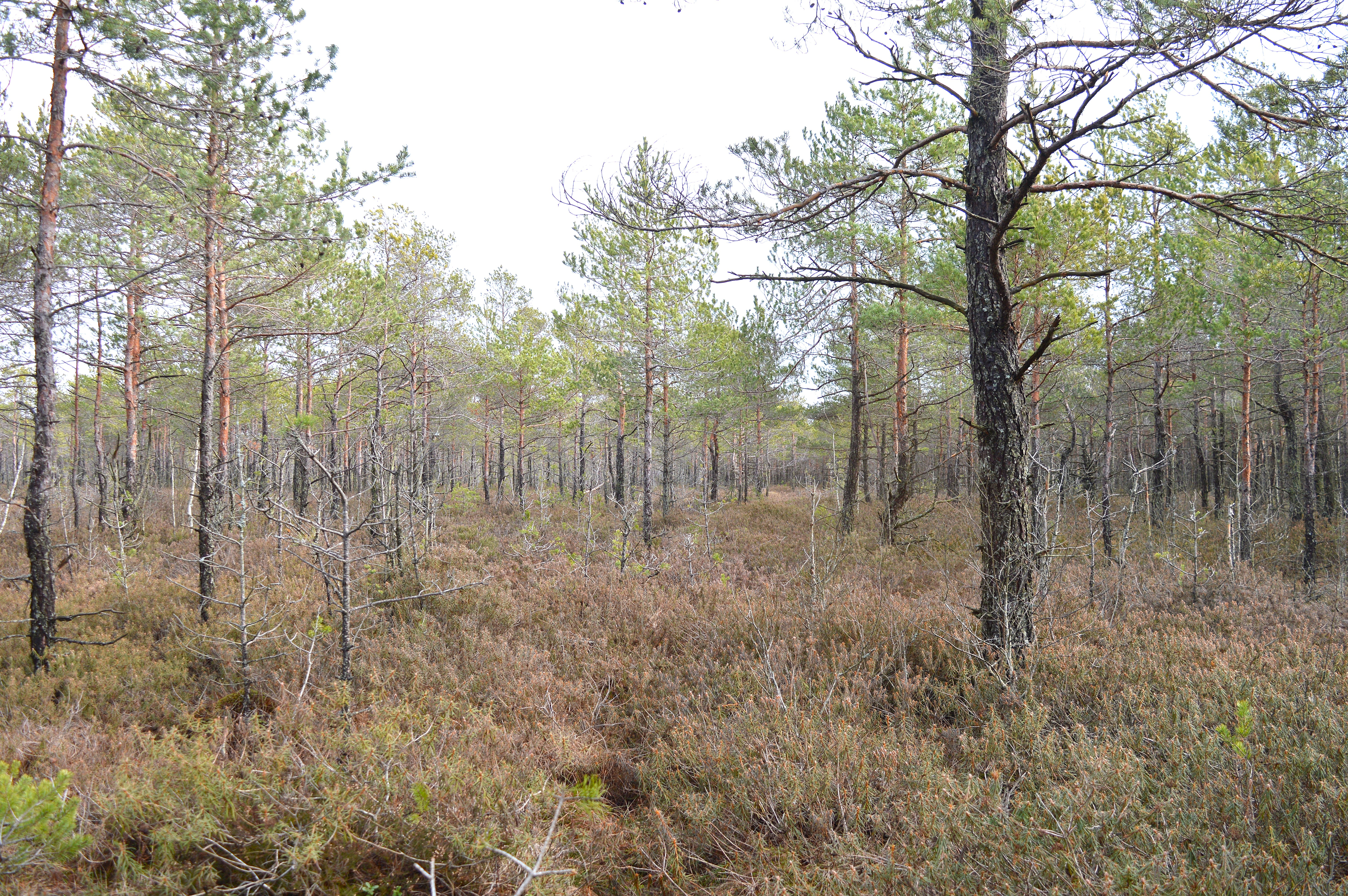
Bogmoss pine forest

Reed-swamps, transitional mires, sedge fens and raised bogs surround the lake. Predominantly in the south-east, reed marshes and sedge fens (with dominating Carex omskiana, C. diandra, C. disticha) cover large areas. On the slopes of raised bogs, bogmoss pine forests occur, whereas in open areas, Calluna vulgaris, Eriophorum vaginatum and Sphagnum species (Sph. magellanicum, Sph. fuscum, Sph. rubellum) are the prevailing species. Wet forests surrounding the lake mainly consist of black alder and birch.

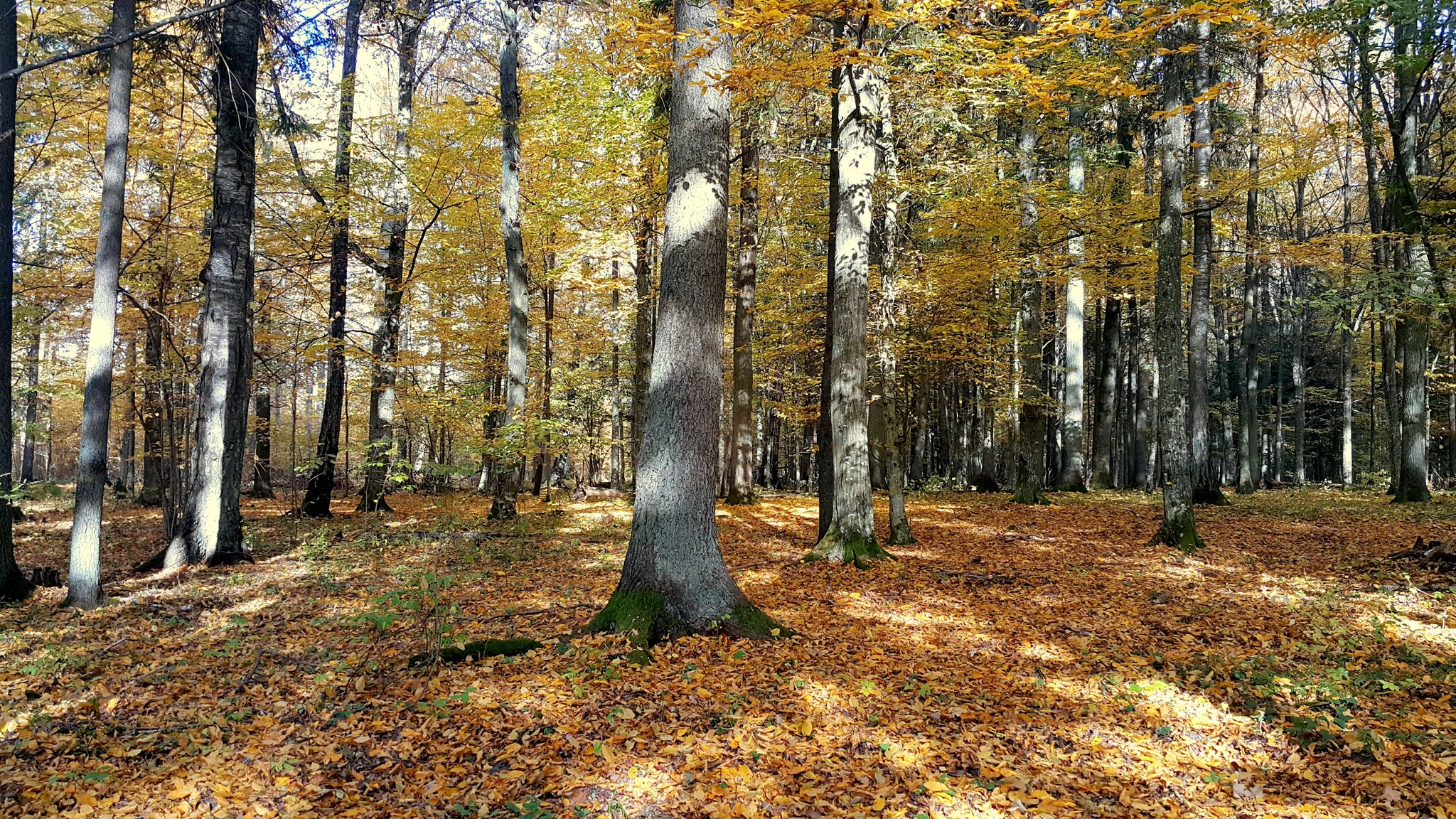
Bukta Forest

Additionally, the Bukta Forest in the reserve is the benchmark of mixed forests of the Central Plain of Lithuania. It contains valuable hornbeam habitats that support plant and fungi species typical of Central European hornbeam and beech forests.

In total, 987 plant species have been identified in the reserve, two of which are protected by the European Union and 30 are listed in the Red Data Book of Lithuania. Additionally, 105 algae and 292 fungi, six of them are listed in the Red Data Book of Lithuania, have been found here. This diversity of habitats and vegetation contributes to outstanding conditions for numerous waterfowl.

=== Fauna ===
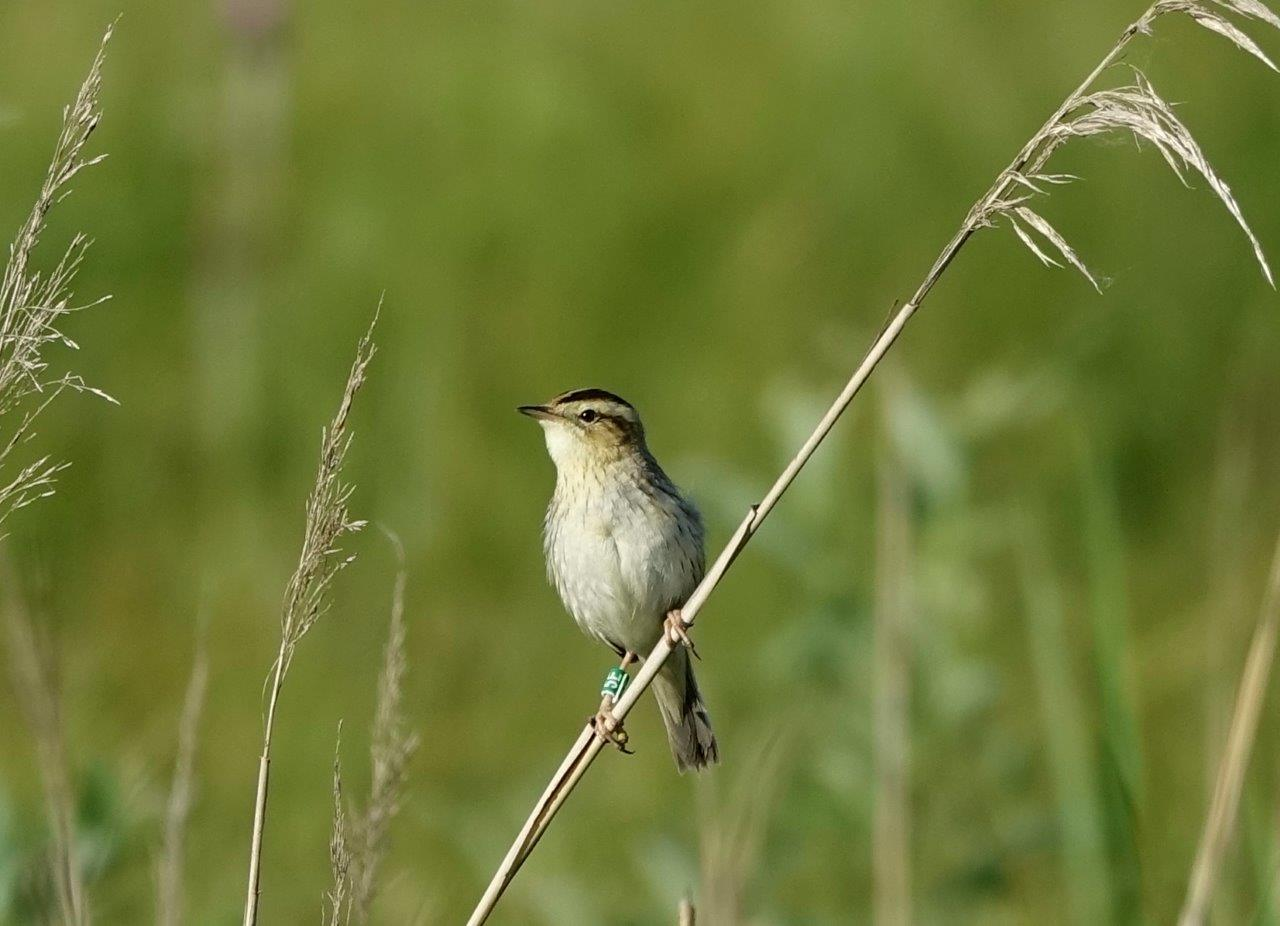
Aquatic warbler in Žuvintas Biosphere Reserve

With now 255 species on the list of birds, the number of bird species in Žuvintas is unmatched in the mainland part of Lithuania. 153 of these species have bred or are currently breeding in the reserve. 42 of the birds are protected by the European Union and 58 are recorded in the Red Data Book of Lithuania. One of the most abundant populations of eurasian bitterns, western marsh harriers and little crakes in the country nest in the lake of Žuvintas. Thousands of cranes and geese, as well as other water and swamp birds rest in the area of the reserve. The aquatic warbler, one of the rarest songbirds in Europe, inhabits the wet meadows of Žuvintas. Being globally endangered, Lithuania is one of the four countries where the aquatic warbler is still breeding. Close to the swamp and Bukta forest is the lake Žaltytis, which is also a crucial place for migratory waterfowl.

There are 45 mammal species in the reserve. Three are protected by the EU and six are registered in the Red Data Book of Lithuania. 23 fish have been found, one of which is under protection of the EU. The number of amphibians and reptiles found in the reserve is 15, of which two are safeguarded by the European Union. 2020 invertebrates populate the reserve. Four of these are protected by the EU and 21 are listed in the Red Data Book of Lithuania.

== Protection history ==
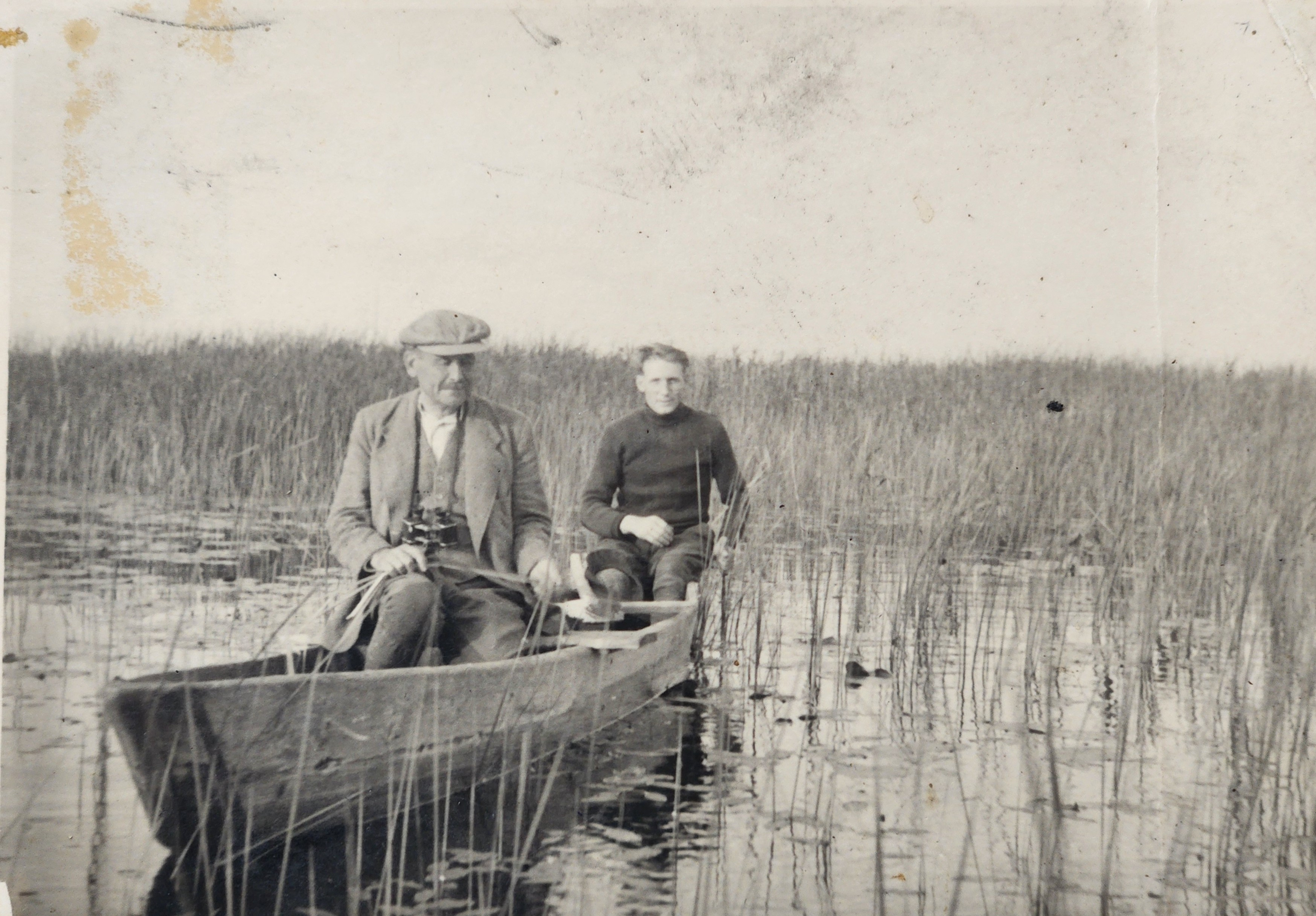
Professor T. Ivanauskas with Jonas Simanynas in 1938 on lake Žuvintas

On 28 January 1928, an order of the Minister of the Interior of the Republic of Lithuania was published which introduced restrictions in Lake Žuvintas and its surroundings. Hunting birds and mammals was prohibited within a 1 km radius around the lake. Throughout the period of independent Lithuania, these hunting restrictions ensuring the legal protection of the reserve were unchanged in force.

The first environmentalist Teofilis Zubavičius arrived in Žuvintas on 5 April 1937 at the invitation of Tadas Ivanauskas, marking the beginning of actual protection. According to written sources, the Žuvintas Reserve was established in 1937, but as no official document naming the exact date of the establishment has survived, it remains unknown.

In the same year, the Ministry of Agriculture of the Republic of Lithuania expropriated Lake Žuvintas from private individuals to preserve endangered waterfowl. It was handed over to the Faculty of Mathematics and Natural Sciences of Kaunas University. As part of this preservation effort, a warden was appointed.

When the Soviet occupation began, Žuvintas lost its reserve status and on 1 October 1940, it was transferred to the People's Commissariat of the Food Industry of the Lithuanian SSR. On 5 February 1946, the Council of People's Commissars of the Lithuanian SSR instructed the Academy of Sciences "to establish a reserve in the Žuvintas district, which would include the Žuvintas lake and the swamp with a forest in the western district". The first reserve office was established. The area of the Žuvintas reserve was 3167.2 hectares. From 1947 to 1963, the Žuvintas Reserve belonged to the Institutes of Botany, Zoology and Parasitology of the Lithuanian SSR.

However, the status of a reserve did not protect birds and mammels from shooting, as Žuvintas was a favoured hunting place of the Soviet government and party leaders in the first few decades after the war.

From 1960 to 1962, a complex scientific research expedition took place in the Žuvintas Reserve, which was led by the Institute of Zoology and Parasitology.

In 1963, the area of the reserve was increased to 5428 ha, and the management was transferred to the Nature Protection Committee.

In order to expand agricultural lands and make most of fertile land in the Dovinė river basin, land reclamation and wetland drainage projects were carried out since the 19th century. Despite the status of the reserve, the hydrological regime of the Žuvintas swamp continued to be artificially influenced. When the water level began to be regulated by the regulator of the Dovinė River sluice, the process of the lake becoming overgrown and the decline in bird populations was greatly accelerated. In 1965–1975, the transitional mire and the low bog of the northern part of the Žuvintas swamp were degraded, and the hydrological regime of the raised bog was disrupted. More than half of the nearby Amalva swamp was also drained. Gradually, the use of the lake's vegetation and the mowing of most of lakeside meadows were stopped.

From 1979 to 1985, the second complex scientific research expedition of the Žuvintas Reserve was carried out.

In 1993, the Žuvintas Nature Reserve was included in the list of protected areas of the Convention on Wetlands and Shallow Waters (Ramsar). Ramsar sites are recognized as being of significant value not only for the country or the countries in which they are located, but for humanity as a whole.

On 19 November 2002, the government of the Republic of Lithuania established the Žuvintas Biosphere Reserve on the basis of the Žuvintas State Nature Reserve, the Žaltytis Ornithological Reserve and the Amalvas Botanical-Zoological Reserve, the area of which is 18490 ha.

In 2004, the territory of the Žuvintas Biosphere Reserve was recognised as an important territory for the protection of birds and was included in the Natura 2000 network, which covers territories that meet the criteria for the conservation of natural habitats and species of European importance, as well as areas significant for the protection of natural habitats.

The Management Plan of the Žuvintas Biosphere Reserve, which provides for the restoration of natural habitats, was approved in 2006.

In 2010, the regulation of the artificial water level in Žuvintas Lake was abandoned.

In 2011, the Žuvintas Biosphere Reserve was included in the UNESCO Programme "Man and the Biosphere" World List of Biosphere Reserves. It is the first and only site in Lithuania in the UNESCO Global Network of Biosphere Reserves.

== Utilisation and protection ==
Within the Reserve, conservation is the guiding principle. Human activities are permitted only under stringent regulation, with priority consistently afforded to the protection of biodiversity, sensitive habitats, and species of European and global significance. The directorate maintains systematic monitoring of habitats and species, contributing data to the national Protected Species Information System. This ongoing scientific assessment is the basis to the following decisions, that are related to conservation in the biosphere reserve.

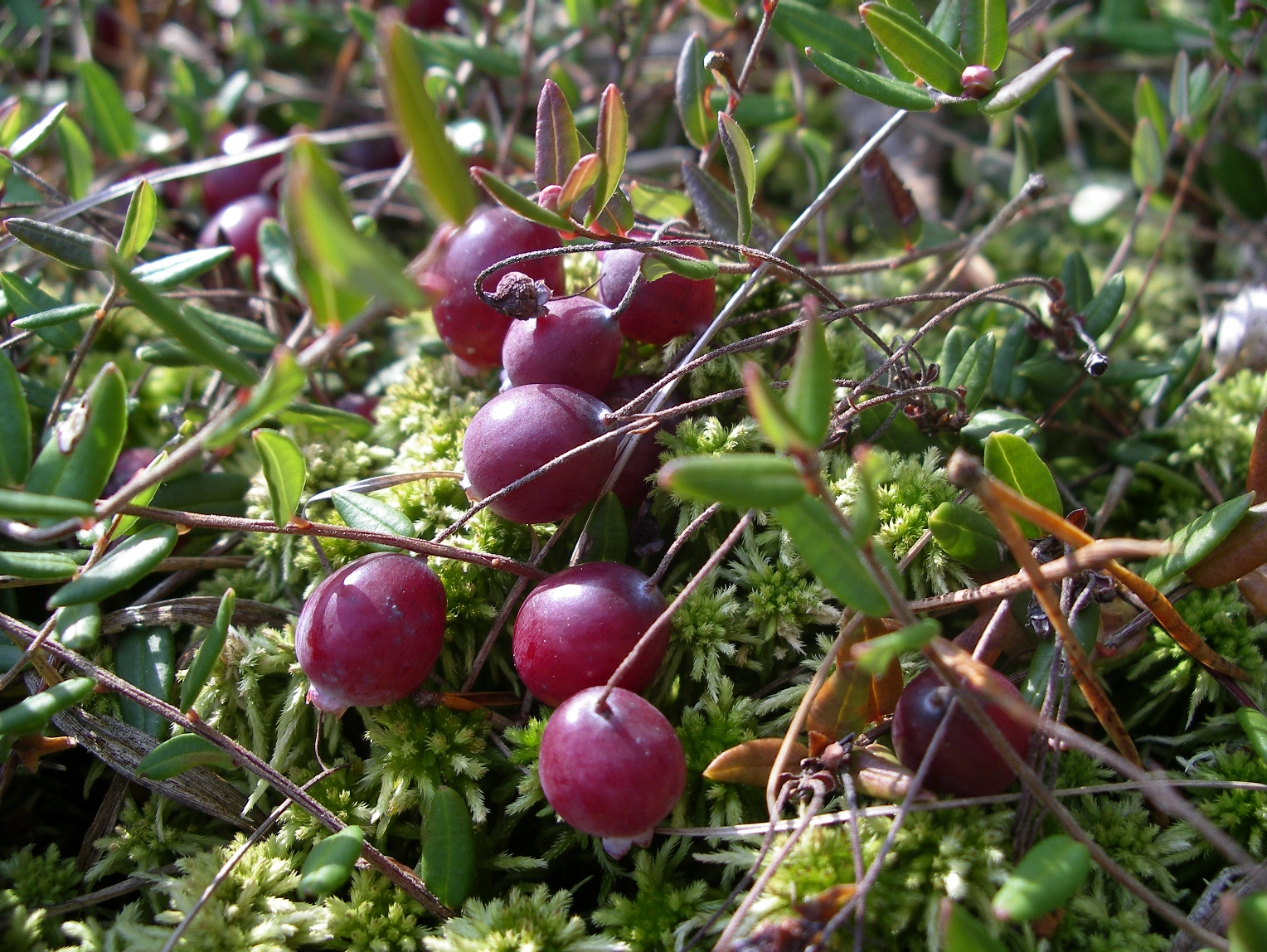
Swamp cranberry (Vaccinium oxycoccos)

- Berry picking is reserved for local residents and only within carefully defined conditions and timeframes, which are announced annually by the directorate. In certain areas, such as Piglet Reserve, berry picking is only allowed from September onward, but in other areas like Amalvas Reserve, restrictions are less stringent. These rules are there to ensure traditional use without major environmental destruction.
- Access to the strict nature reserves is highly regulated, with entry primarily granted for research or educational purposes and requiring coordination with the directorate. Independent visits are limited to the educational trails, during daylight hours, and outside of sensitive periods bird breeding. Low-altitude overflights (below 1 km) also require prior approval.
- Hunting is tightly controlled: the use of feeders, baiting, or hunting of water and wetland birds is strictly prohibited. Feeding ungulates in buffer zones is not permitted, and tracking injured animals is only allowed under regulated conditions and with directorate coordination.
- Fishing is entirely prohibited in Žuvintas Lake. Other lakes, such as Žaltytis, only allow fishing from the shore or on ice within specific zones. Additional restrictions apply to Amalvas lake, including bans on live bait, mandatory release of pike and highly limited ice-fishing opportunities.
- Water use and boating are under strict limitations to prevent ecological disturbance. On Žuvintas Lake, access is confined to scientific and educational purposes. In other lakes, boating may be entirely forbidden or allowed only under specific conditions, such as the use of non-motorized boats on Lake Amalvas between July and March.
- Within Natura 2000 zones, all activities undergo rigorous evaluation for environmental impact. Therefore afforestation and economic activities require formal permits and landowners receive certificates with specific restrictions or opportunities for support management in accordance with EU directives.

To preserve the natural and cultural heritage values, three strict nature reserves (IUCN category I) and six sanctuaries (one botanical and five botanical–zoological; IUCN category IV) have been designated within the Žuvintas Biosphere Reserve.

Strict Nature Reserves:

- Buktbalė Strict Nature Reserve protects typical communities of deciduous and hornbeam forests, swampy deciduous woodland, and alluvial forest habitats. It also safeguards habitats of protected species such as Alisma lanceolatum, Cerastium sylvaticum, Lythrum portula, Platanthera chlorantha and white-backed woodpecker.
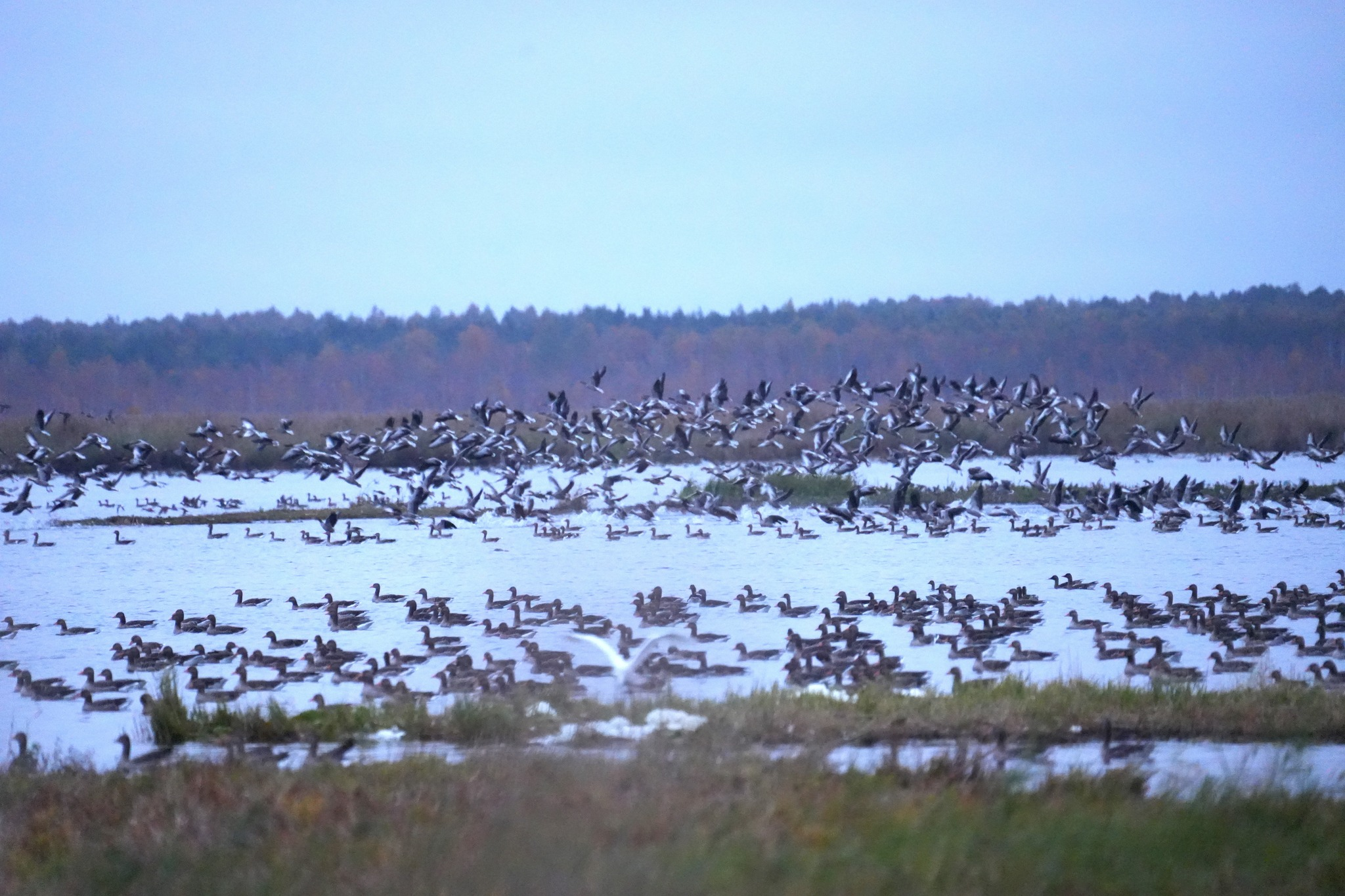
  Thousands of geese on lake Žuvintas during migration
- Liūliškynė Strict Nature Reserve was established to protect moist broadleaf forests, especially hornbeam, swampy deciduous woodland, and alluvial forest. The reserve provides habitats for protected species like Arctium nemorosum.
- Žuvintas Strict Nature Reserve is the largest wetland complex with a lake in Lithuania. It is an important breeding and stopover site for numerous waterfowl species during migration

Botanical and Botanical–Zoological Reserves:

- Liepakojai Botanical Reserve conserves alkaline fen habitats and breeding sites of protected species such as Liparis loeselii, Dactylorhiza ochroleuca and aquatic warbler.
- Zelsva Botanical and Zoological Reserve protects broadleaf forests with hornbeam, typical for southwestern Lithuania. It provides habitats for species such as Hedera helix, Vicia dumetorum, and Euphydryas maturna.
- Kiaulyčia Botanical–Zoological Reserve preserves wetlands, sedge communities, meadows, and transition mires. Habitats include alluvial grasslands, lowland meadows, mineral-rich springs, and swampy deciduous forests. Protected species in this area include Gentiana pneumonanthe, Vertigo angustior, Bombina bombina, Circus pygargus (Montagu's harrier).
- Amalvas Botanical–Zoological Reserve includes part of the Amalvas Mire and Lake, protecting biodiversity and nesting sites of species such as Porzana porzana (Spotted crake), Lyrurus tetrix (Black grouse), Luscinia svecica (Bluethroat). It also functions as a staging area for migratory birds. Damaged wetland habitats have been and are being restored in this area.
- Žaltytis Reserve represents a typical eutrophic lake. It is a place of aggregation of sandpipers and various other migratory waterfowl.
- Paželsviai Botanical–Zoological Reserve protects moist broadleaf forests, alluvial forests, and herb-rich spruce habitats.

== Management ==
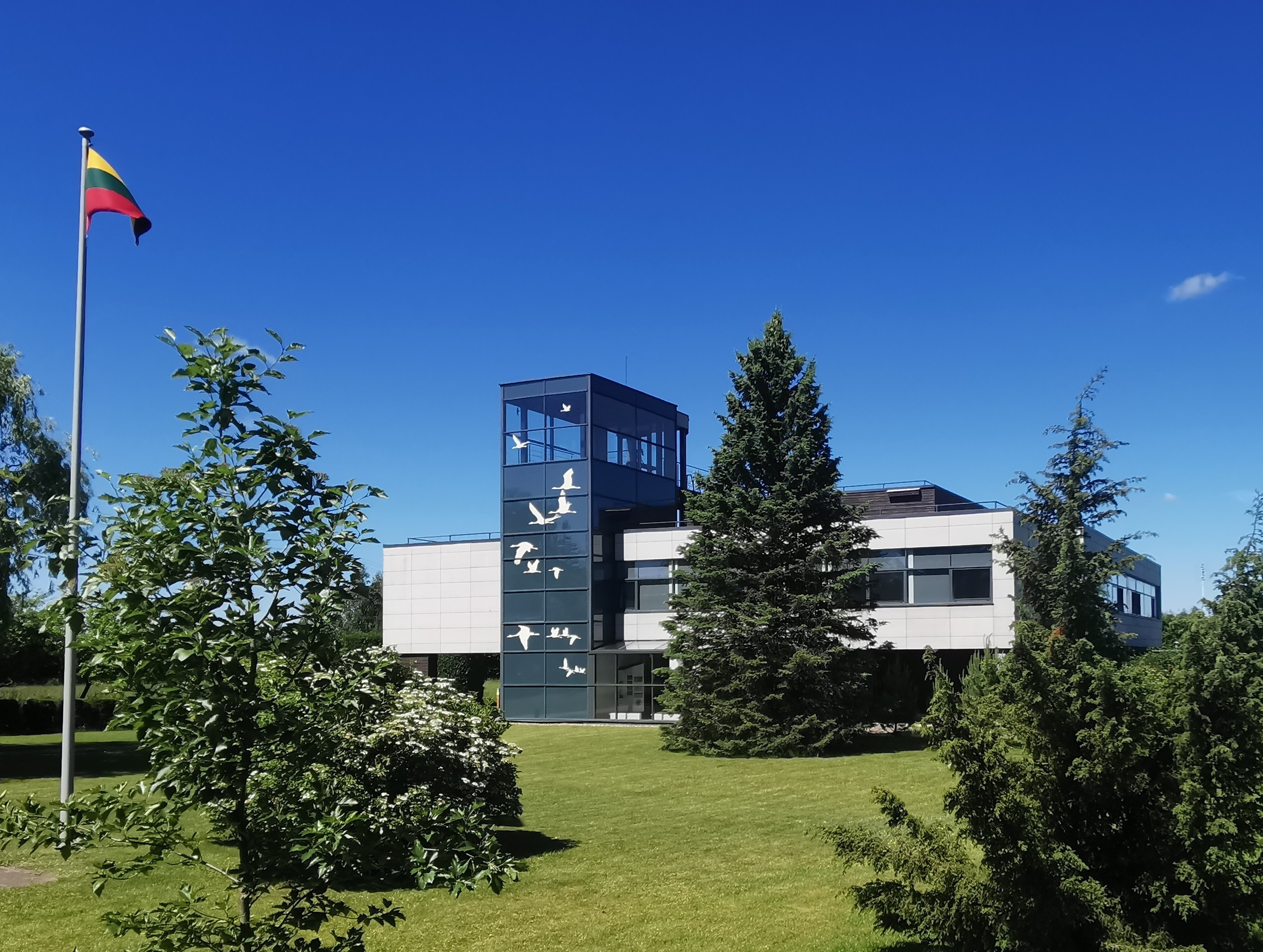
The Directorate and the Visitor center in Aleknonys

The Directorate of Dzūkija-Suvalkija Protected Areas was founded by the State Service of Protected Areas under the Ministry of Environment of the Republic of Lithuania. It is a budgetary institution that organizes activities in the Žuvintas Biosphere Reserve.

Main functions of the Directorate:

- organising conservation works of the stability and biota components of the natural ecosystem
- coordinating the natural research and observations of the biosphere reserve
- collecting information on the state and changes of the components of the natural environment
- enabling applied research in the field of nature conservation
- organising the restoration of destroyed and damaged natural complexes and objects
- executing ecological education and training
- supervising the biosphere reserve, controlling the economic activity of natural and legal persons within the scope of its competence
- coordinating land plot formation and land reform projects
- participating in territorial planning and building project coordination, issuing special requirements for the protected areas
- drawing up conclusions on state and private forest management projects
- managing the Natura 2000 site: evaluating impacts of activities, issuing certificates for activity restrictions, forest owner support, afforestation permits, submitting data on habitats and sites of protected species to the Information System of Protected Species, concluding protection agreements with owners of private land on land, forest, and water use restrictions

== Tourism, education, science ==
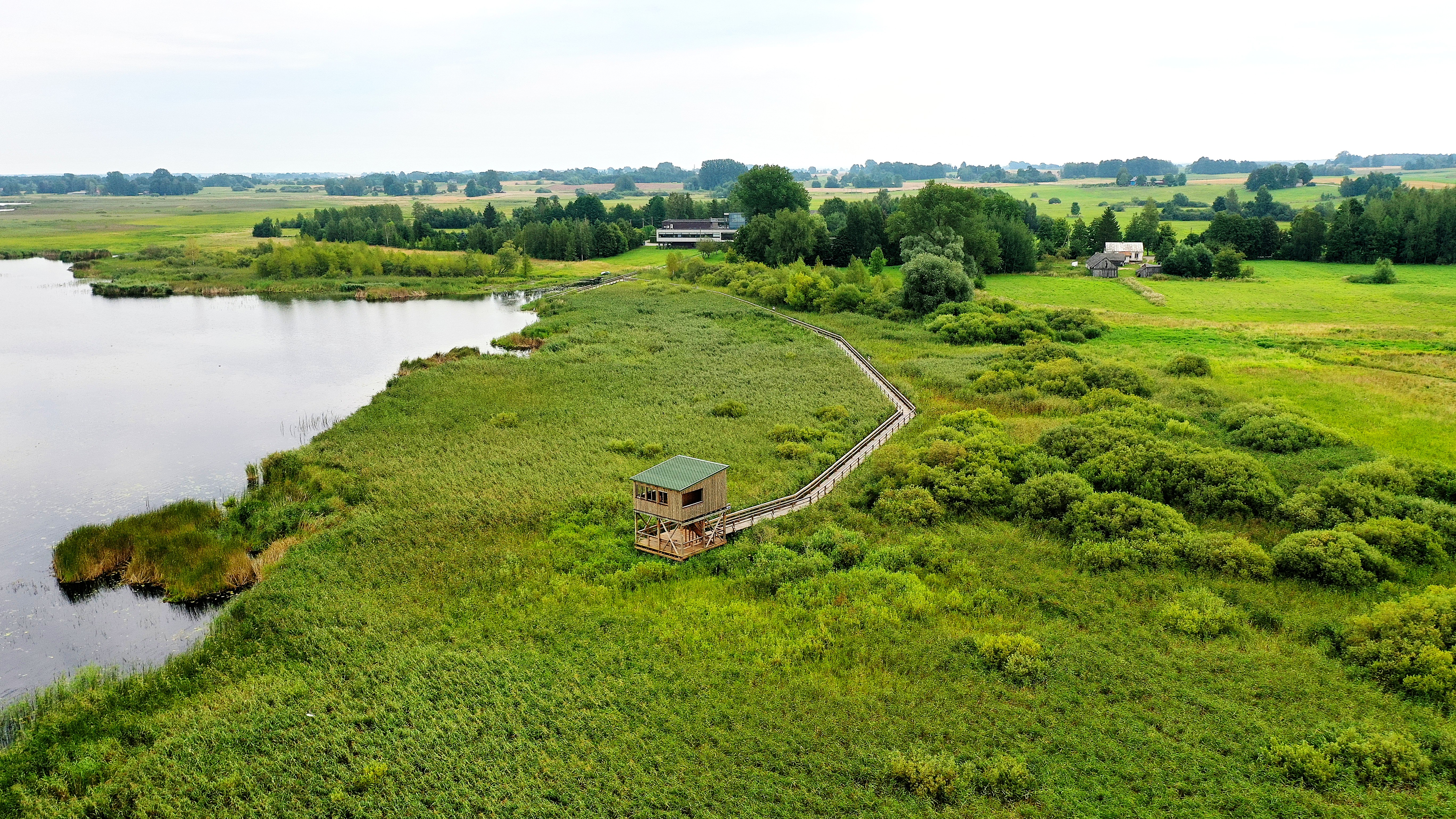
Lake Žuvintas pedestrian trail

As the oldest protected area in Lithuania, Žuvintas Biosphere Reserve serves as an important example for nature conservation, education and scientific research.

For visitors and researchers, there are nature paths, a visitor centre including a museum and accommodations for researchers, school groups or other visitors. Nature trails include one in Bukta forest or the boardwalk at lake Žuvintas. There are also several bird-watching platforms for visitors.

Scientific research at Žuvintas has been done on several topics including hydrology and water management, limnology, ornithology, ecology, soil and peat studies. Ongoing projects involve projects on conservation of biodiversity, agro-environment, rural development and water management issues.

== Challenges and condition of ecosystems ==
Peatlands, being unique ecosystems, play a crucial role in preserving biodiversity and reducing the greenhouse effect, as they have a high capacity to store carbon dioxide. Additionally, peatlands can store large amounts of water. This is also due to the unique vegetation of peatlands, for example Sphagnum moss that can retain massive amounts of water.

Belonging to the Žuvintas Biosphere Reserve, the Amalva Peatland faced desiccation as a consequence of peat extraction and farming, which included intensive drainage in the early 20th century.

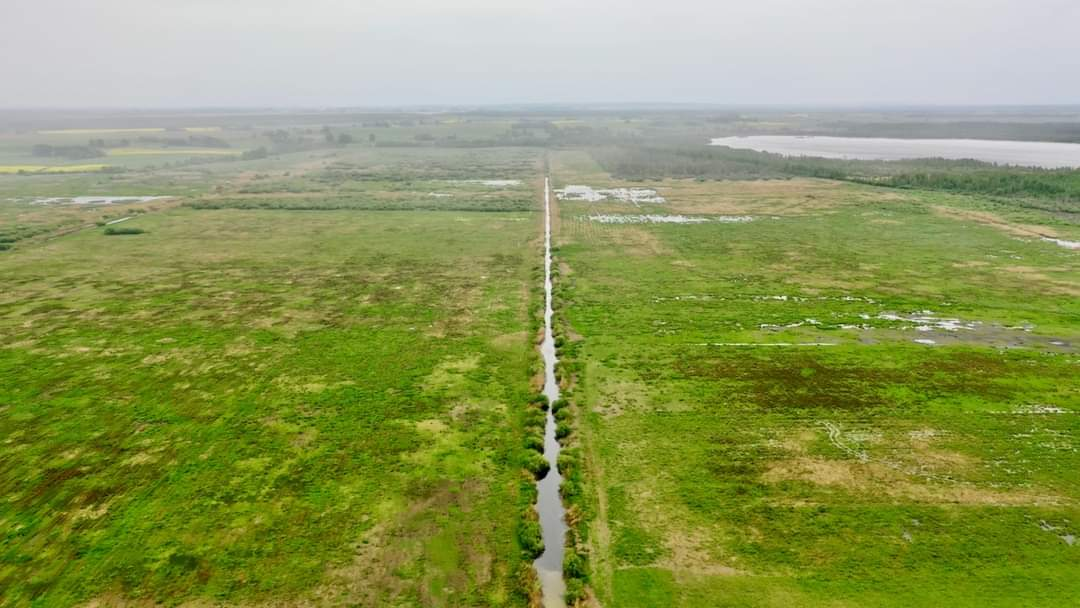
Drainage canals from the Soviet Period nowadays

This problem arose during the Soviet period, when, for the purpose of peat extraction and farming, drainage canals and pipes were constructed. These drainage systems disrupted the natural circulation of water and the ability to retain moisture of the peat. As a result, the soil dried out and the Amalva peatland progressively degraded. With reduced groundwater and peat levels, forests and bushes covered the peat surfaces which resulted in the decomposition of the top layers of peat that function as a gas repository. This led to a rise in the greenhouse effect and a significant loss of biodiversity.

The vegetation shifting from wetland types to forests had a negative impact on mosses of the genus of Sphagnum and other indigenous plants like tussock cottongrass (Eriophorum vaginatum), marshberry (Vaccinium oxycoccos) and roundleaf sundew (Drosera rotundifolia). As their habitat was changing, many animal species, such as the black grouse (Tetrao tetrix), great grey shrike (Lanius excubitor), common crane (Grus grus) and other wetland birds, were under threat.

Within six years, the Amalva peatland was restored with support from the European Union. Carefully planned measures, such as the restoration of natural water levels by blocking the drainage canals, clearing trees and bushes and the reintroduction of typical peatland vegetation (peatland mosses, tussock cottongrass, roundleaf sundew and other plants), were implemented to achieve a successful restoration. Hydrological conditions, water circulation through the soil and the water retention capacity of the peat have already improved. The vegetation is expected to fully return to plant communities typical of these areas.

To date, this restoration has contributed to a reduction of greenhouse gas emissions and has had a positive impact on populations of rare and protected animal species - black grouse and great grey shrike.

The local community participated in this restoration by planning activities and clearing forests, trees and bushes. Information campaigns about the importance of this wetland habitat motivated citizens to take in this endeavour.

While the average forest cover in Lithuania is 33%, the forest cover in the area of the reserve is relatively low (approximately 16%). Most of the surrounding areas of the biosphere reserve are productive agricultural land with a higher productivity than the average of the country. This results in a decline in water quality in the lakes within the Dovinė river catchment, as the water bodies become more eutrophic. The whole wetland system in the reserve and particularly Žuvintas lake is being severely affected by leaching of nutrients from farmland in the basin, degrading the ecosystems and their values.

== Culture ==
The biosphere reserve is located in an intensive farming region. Traditional hay-mowing and pasturage practices, especially in fen grasslands, have been used in these areas for a long time.

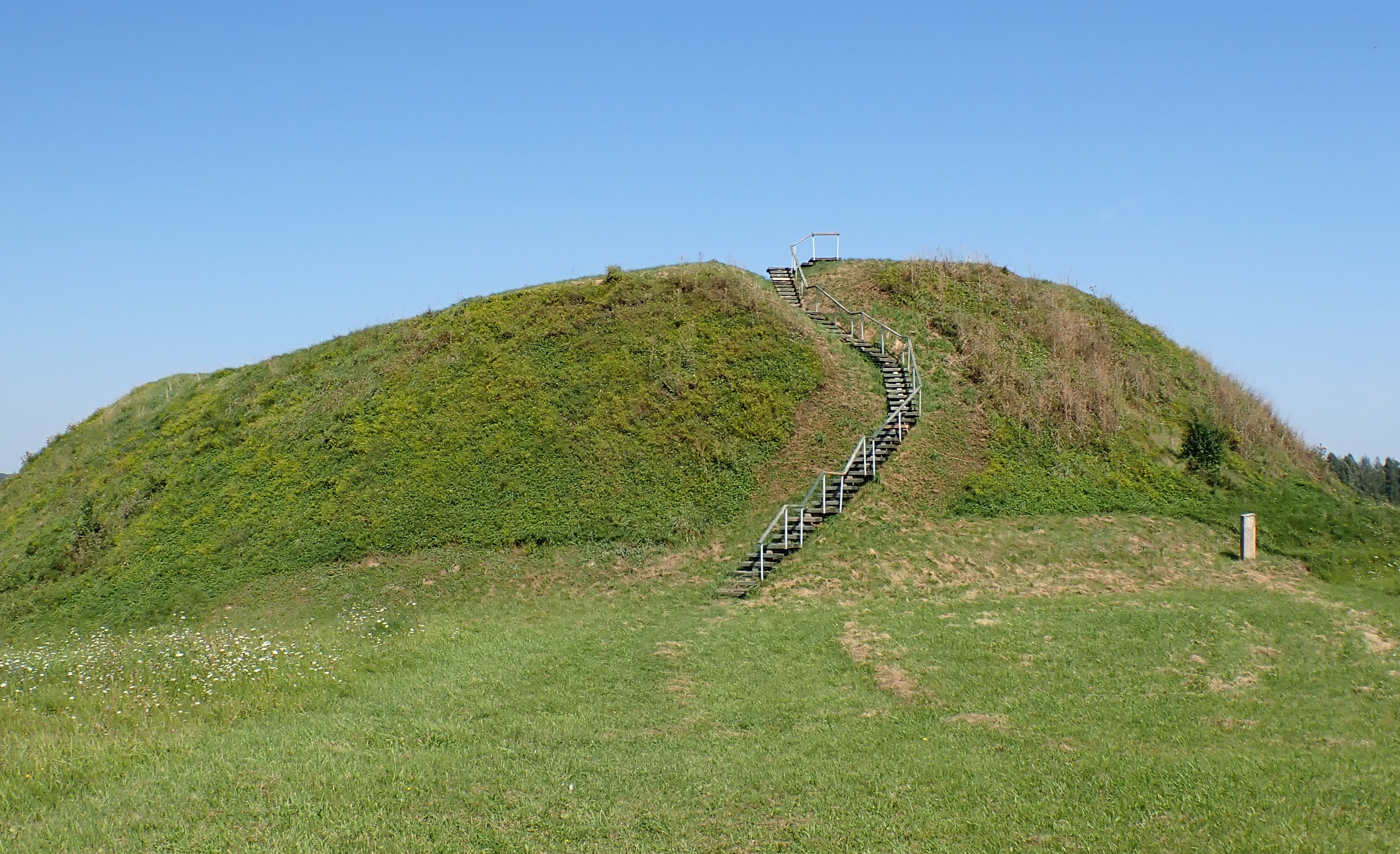
Varnupiai mound in Varnupiai village

The territory offers cultural heritage objects of local and national significance. The largest archaeological monument is the Varnupiai mound with an ancient settlement, located in Varnupiai village (Igliauka eldership, Marijampolė municipality). It was constructed by humans; lots of wood was used for the construction of the embankment. In the territory of the Varnupiai mound between the Žuvintas and Amalva hills, people were already living during the Stone Age. Furthermore, archaeological finds linked to the Yotvingian culture, dating back to the 1st millennium - 13th century, have been found in this territory. To the south of the mound lies the mythological “Padkavinis” stone with a carved horseshoe sign.

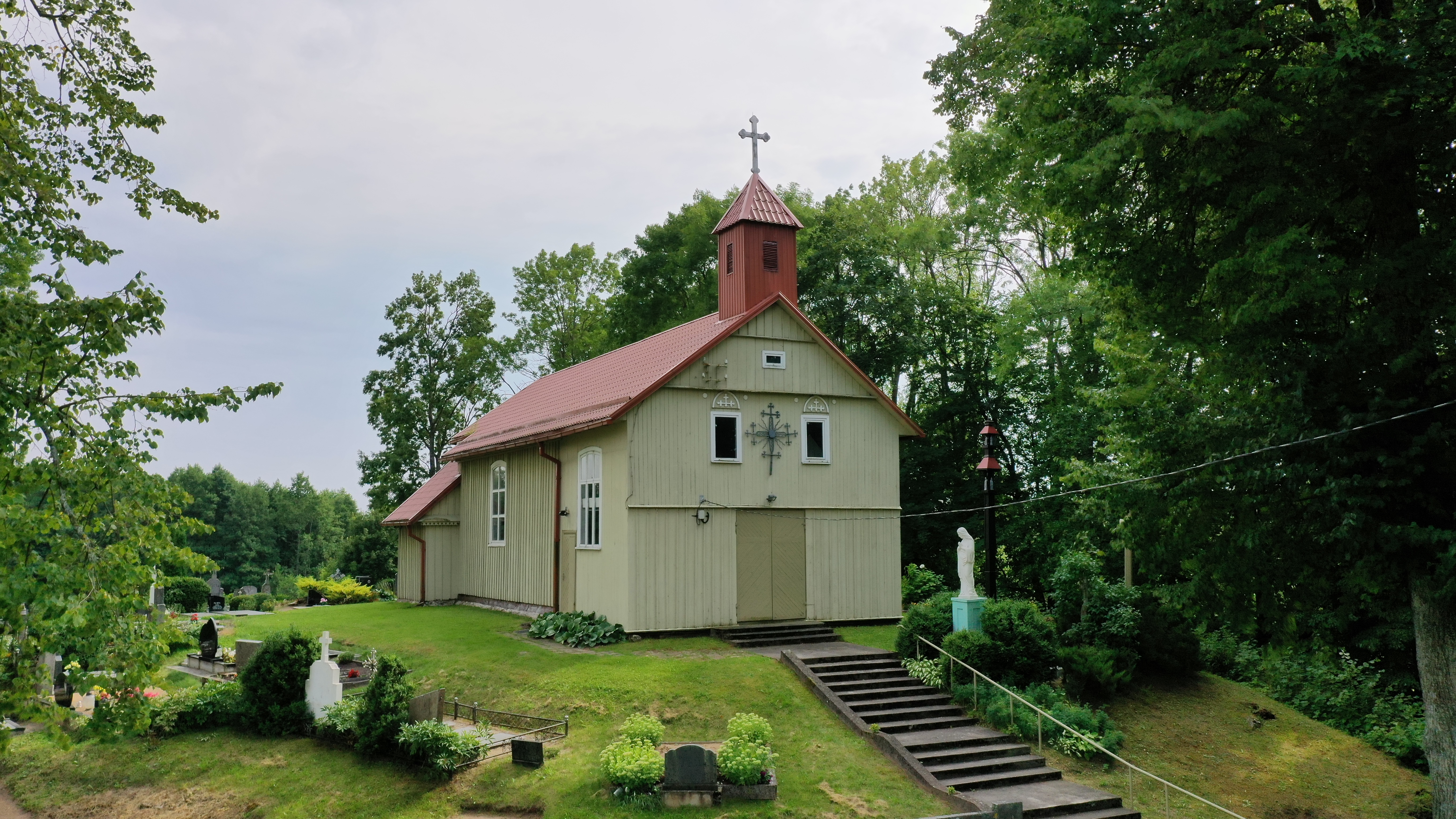
Holy Trinity Church in Riečių

And there are even more objects of cultural heritage in the territory – the old cemeteries of villages and graves of participants of historical events (9 of them throughout the territory of the biosphere reserve) and two churches (St. George church in Daukšiai and Holy Trinity Church in Riečiai).

== Representation ==
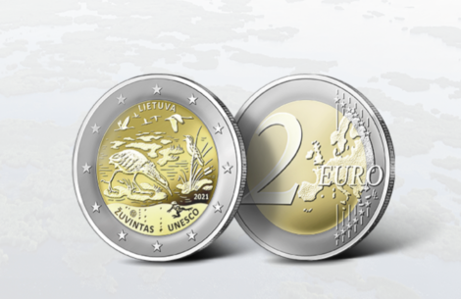
Commemorative Euro coin from 2022 dedicated to Žuvintas Biosphere Reserve

- In 2013, Zuvintas Biosphere Reserve was featured on Lithuanian postal stamps.
- In 2016, Irish RTÉ Radio 1 won Rose D'Or for The Dawn Chorus programme, featuring bird song from Zuvintas Biosphere Reserve.
- In 2021, Lithuania's central bank released a commemorative euro coin dedicated to Žuvintas Biosphere Reserve. Half a million coins were issued.

== See also ==
- List of national parks of Lithuania
- List of protected areas of Lithuania
- Biosphere reserve
