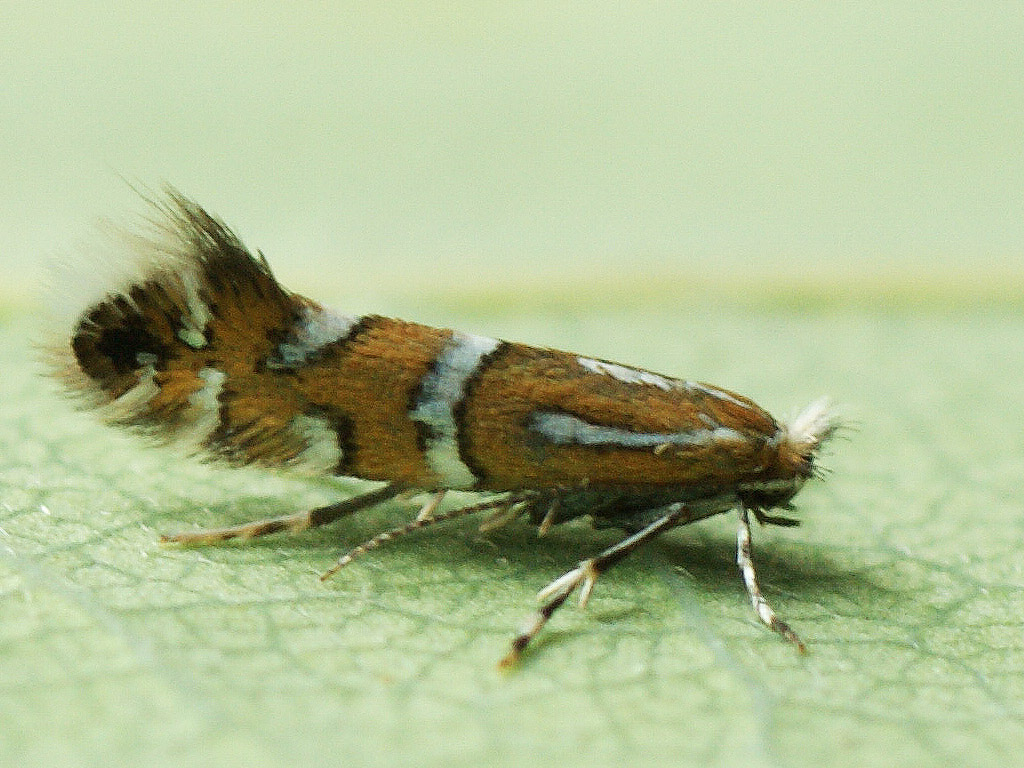
- Phyllonorycter insignitella - Моль-пестрянка клеверная (26121814887).jpg

Scientific classification
- Kingdom: Animalia
- Phylum: Arthropoda
- Clade: Pancrustacea
- Class: Insecta
- Order: Lepidoptera
- Family: Gracillariidae
- Genus: Phyllonorycter
- Species: P. insignitella

Binomial name
- Phyllonorycter insignitella (Zeller, 1846)

Synonyms
- Lithocolletis insignitella Zeller, 1846

= Phyllonorycter insignitella =

Species of moth

Phyllonorycter insignitella is a moth of the family Gracillariidae. It is found in all of Europe, except the Balkan Peninsula.

The wingspan is 7–8 mm. Differs from L. nigrescentella as follows : forewings more orange -tinged, margins of silvery white markings blacker, basal streak somewhat longer, first costal and dorsal spots more opposite, cilia more sharply barred with white on second dorsal spot.

The larvae feed on Lathyrus, Medicago lupulina, Ononis repens, Trifolium alpestre, Trifolium medium, Trifolium montanum, Trifolium pratense and Vicia species.
