= List of protected areas of Lithuania =

The Baltic nation of Lithuania is home to several protected areas, which receive protection because of their environmental, cultural or similar value. The total area of Lithuania’s protected terrestrial territories is 11,028 km^{2} (4,258 sq mi), which amounts to approximately 17.04% of the country’s territory. In addition 1,568 km^{2} (605 sq mi) of marine area protected, or 25.59% of the country’s territorial waters. Total number of protected areas — 1060. In Lithuania there are 6 Strict Nature Reserves, 5 National Parks, 30 Regional Parks, 404 Managed Nature Reserves and 7 Ramsar sites.

== Strict nature reserves ==
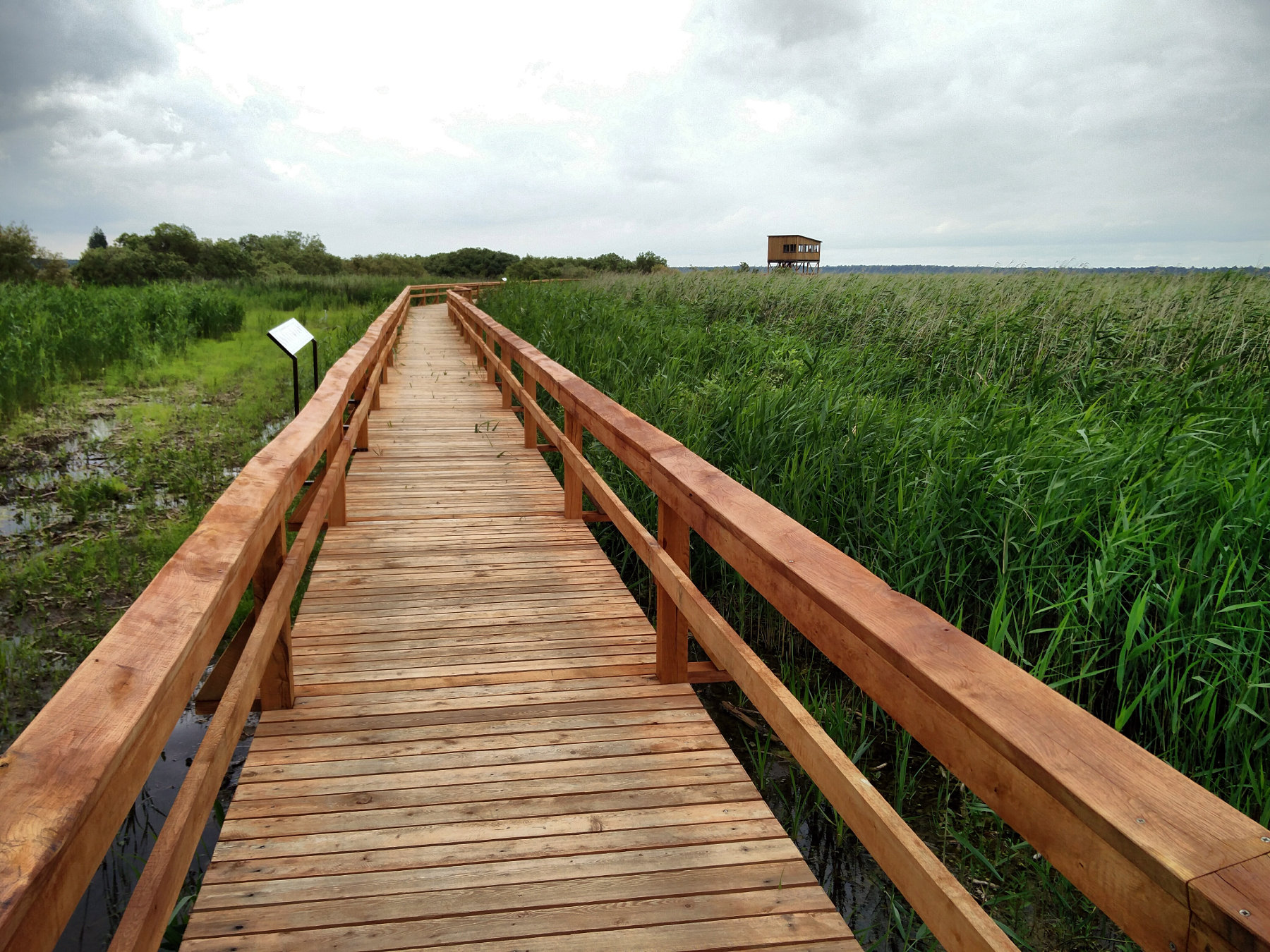
Walkway in Zuvintas Biosphere Reserve (2020)

In Lithuania there are 6 strict nature reserves.

- Cepkeliu Valstybinis Gamtinis Rezervatas
- Dubravos Rezervatine Apyrube
- Kamanu Valstybinis Gamtinis Rezervatas
- Viesviles Valstybinis Gamtinis Rezervatas
- Vilniaus Piliu Valstybinis Kulturinis Rezervatas
- Zuvintas Biosphere Reserve

== Managed reserves ==
In Lithuania there are 405 managed nature reserves.

== Ramsar sites ==
In Lithuania there are 7 Ramsar sites.

- Adutiskis-Svyla-Birveta Wetland Complex
- Cepkeliai
- Girutiskis bog
- Kamanos
- Nemunas Delta
- Viesvilé
- Zuvintas

== See also ==
- List of national parks of Lithuania
- Environmental issues in Lithuania
