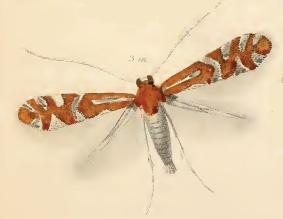

Scientific classification
- Domain: Eukaryota
- Kingdom: Animalia
- Phylum: Arthropoda
- Class: Insecta
- Order: Lepidoptera
- Family: Gracillariidae
- Genus: Phyllonorycter
- Species: P. nigrescentella

Binomial name
- Phyllonorycter nigrescentella (Logan, 1851)

Synonyms
- Lithocolletis nigrescentella Logan, 1851

= Phyllonorycter nigrescentella =

Species of moth

Phyllonorycter nigrescentella is a moth of the family Gracillariidae. It is known from all of Europe except the Balkan Peninsula.

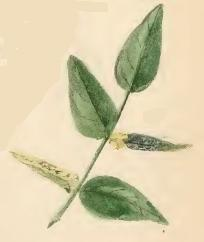
Mined leaf of Vicia sepium

Larva

The wingspan is 7–9 mm. The head is fuscous, face leaden-metallic. Forewings golden-ochreous, sometimes more or less suffused with fuscous or dark fuscous; a silvery-white dark-edged median streak from base to 1/3; a curved fascia before middle, three posterior costal and two dorsal triangular spots silvery-white, dark-margined; a blackish apical spot. Hindwings are rather dark grey. The larva is yellowish; dorsal line dark green; head very pale brownish.

The larvae feed on Lathyrus vernus, Lotus, Medicago, Trifolium alpestre, Trifolium medium, Trifolium pratense, Trifolium repens, Trifolium rubens, Vicia dumetorum, Vicia sativa and Vicia sepium.
