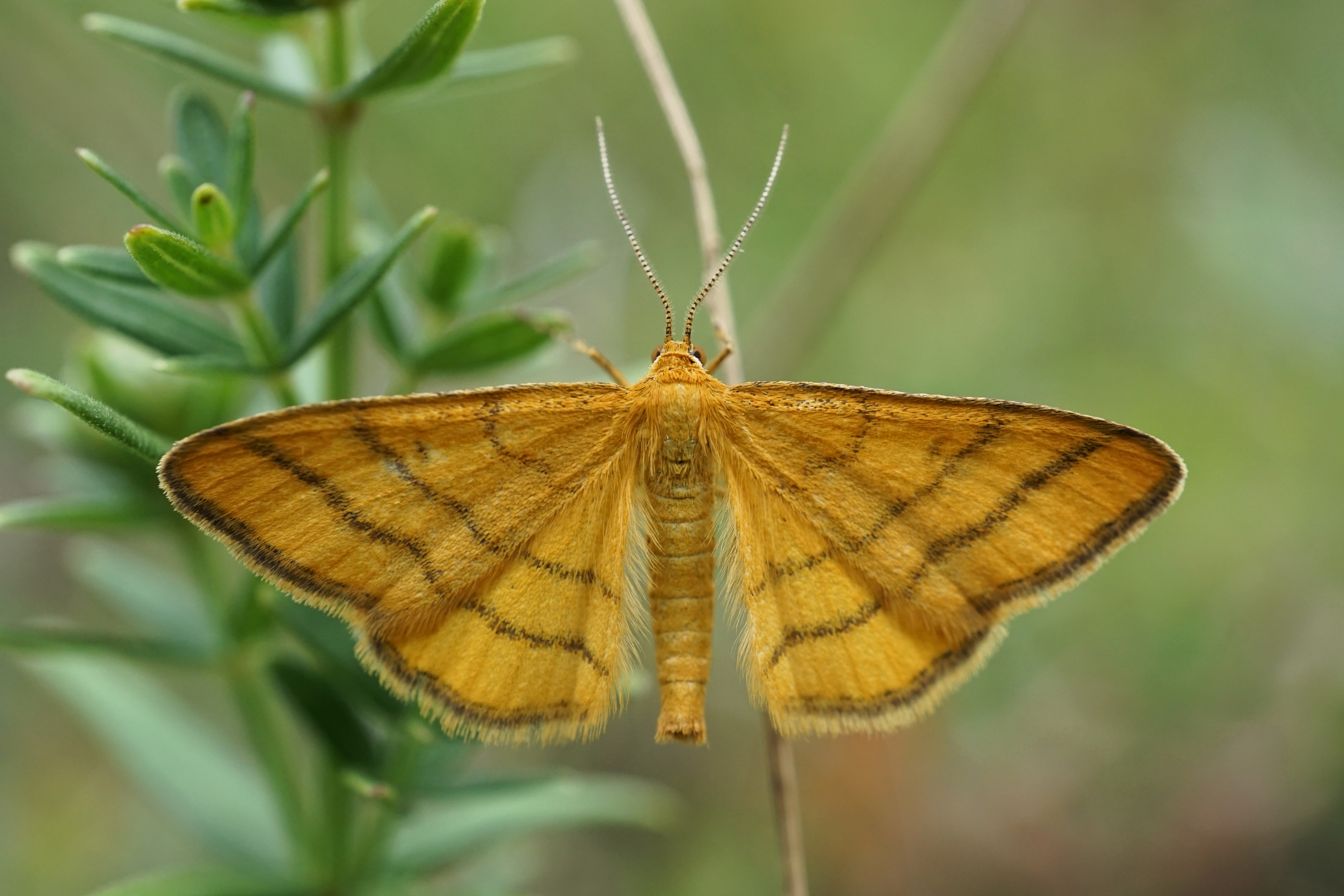

Scientific classification
- Kingdom: Animalia
- Phylum: Arthropoda
- Clade: Pancrustacea
- Class: Insecta
- Order: Lepidoptera
- Family: Geometridae
- Genus: Idaea
- Species: I. aureolaria

Binomial name
- Idaea aureolaria (Denis & Schiffermüller, 1775)

Synonyms
- Geometra aureolaria Denis & Schiffermuller, 1775; Phalaena bicinctaria de Villers, 1789; Acidalia transsylvanaria Dannehl, 1927; Phalaena trilinearia Hubner, 1787

= Idaea aureolaria =

Species of moth

Idaea aureolaria is a species of moth of the family Geometridae. It is found from Spain and France through central Europe to the Balkan Peninsula and east to Siberia. It is also found from Turkey to Central Asia.

The wingspan is 16–20 millimetres (0.63–0.79 in) for males and 14–19 millimetres (0.55–0.75 in) for females. Adults are mainly on wing in June and July, but a second generation with adults on wing from August to September might occur.

The larvae are polyphagous and have been recorded feeding on Rumex, Onobrychis, Securigera varia and Vicia dumetorum. The species overwinters in the larval stage.
