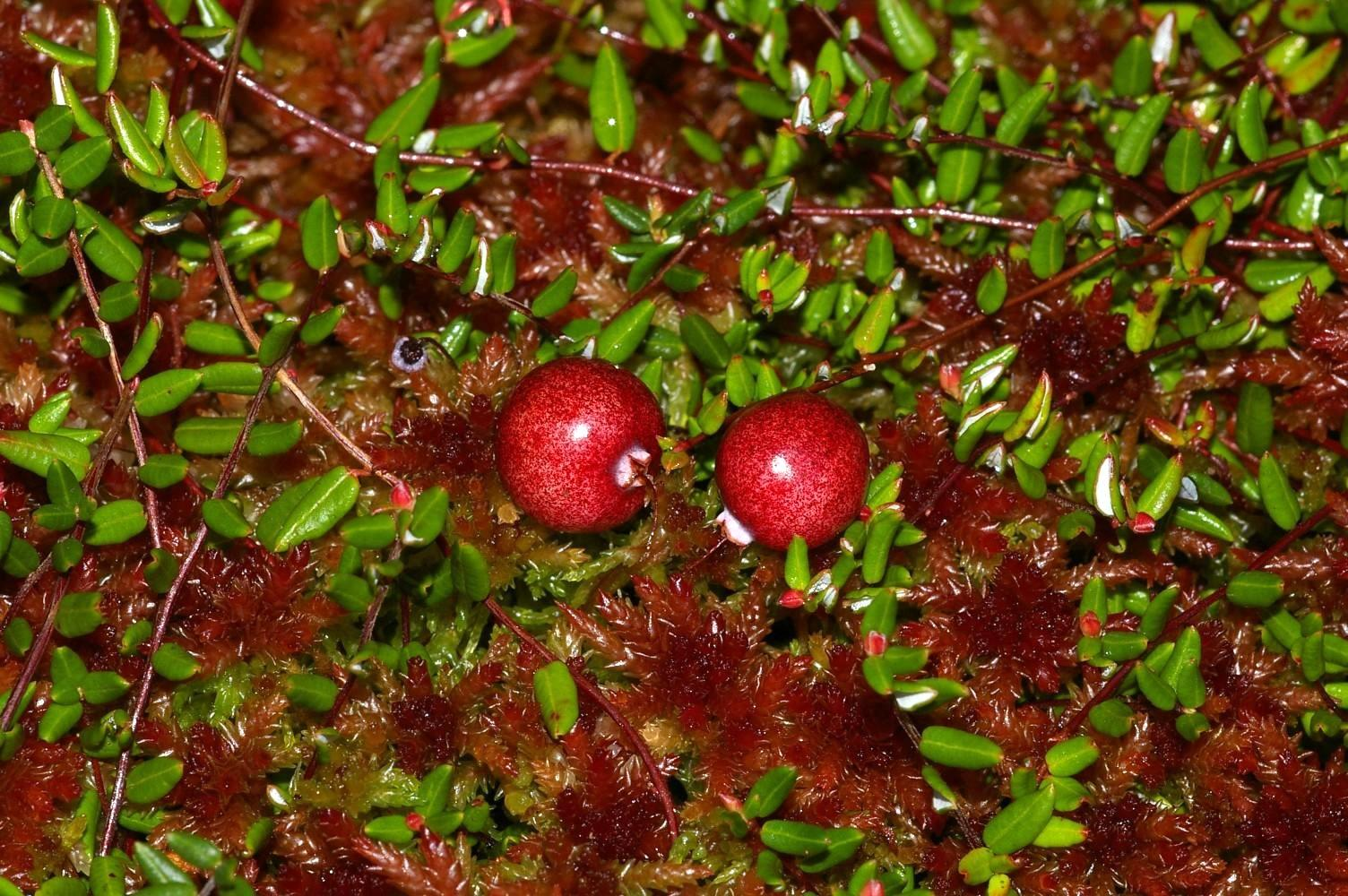
- Fruit on a bed of Sphagnum rubellum

Conservation status
- Least Concern (IUCN 3.1)

- Secure (NatureServe)

Scientific classification
- Kingdom: Plantae
- Clade: Embryophytes
- Clade: Tracheophytes
- Clade: Spermatophytes
- Clade: Angiosperms
- Clade: Eudicots
- Clade: Asterids
- Order: Ericales
- Family: Ericaceae
- Genus: Vaccinium
- Subgenus: Vaccinium subg. Oxycoccus
- Species: V. oxycoccos

Binomial name
- Vaccinium oxycoccos L. 1753

Synonyms
- Synonymy: Vaccinium oxycoccus Linnaeus; Oxycoca vulgaris Raf.; Oxycoccus oxycoccos (L.) MacMill.; Oxycoccus palustris Pers.; Oxycoccus quadripetalus Schinz & Thell.; Oxycoccus quadripetalus Gilib.; Oxycoccus vulgaris Hill; Schollera europaea Steud.; Schollera oxycoccos (L.) Roth; Schollera paludosa Baumg.; Schollera palustris Steud.

= Vaccinium oxycoccos =

Species of flowering plant

Vaccinium oxycoccos is a species of cranberry in the heath family. It is known as small cranberry, marshberry, bog cranberry, swamp cranberry, or (particularly in Britain) just cranberry. It occurs broadly across cooler climates in the temperate Northern Hemisphere.

== Description ==
This cranberry is a small, prostrate shrub with vine-like stems that root at the nodes. The evergreen leaves are leathery and lance-shaped, up to 1.2 centimetres (1/2 inch) long. The stems are a few cm tall, upon which are one to a few pink to red nodding flowers with four petals. The corolla is white or pink and flexed backward away from the center of the flower.

The fruit is a pink or red berry which has spots when young. It measures up to 1.2 cm (1/2 in) wide. Its fruit persists for an average of 200 days and bears an average of 7 seeds. The fruits average 86.4% water and their dry weight includes 4.2% carbohydrates and 1.8% lipids. The plant mainly reproduces vegetatively.

== Distribution and habitat ==
Vaccinium oxycoccos is a widespread and common species occurring broadly across cooler climates in the temperate Northern Hemisphere, including northern Europe, northern Asia and northern North America.

It is an indicator of moist to wet soils which are low in nitrogen and have a high water table. It is an indicator of coniferous swamps. It grows in bogs and fens in moist forest habitat. It grows on peat which may be saturated most of the time. The soil in bogs is acidic and low in nutrients. The plant's mycorrhizae help it obtain nutrients in this situation. Fens have somewhat less acidic soil, which is also higher in nutrients. The plant can often be found growing on hummocks of Sphagnum mosses.

== Ecology ==
In North America, other species found in this forest understory habitat include leatherleaf (Chamaedaphne calyculata), bog rosemary (Andromeda glaucophylla), bog laurel (Kalmia polifolia), pitcher plant (Sarracenia purpurea), Labrador tea (Rhododendron groenlandicum), cloudberry (Rubus chamaemorus), rhodora (Rhododendron canadense), glossy buckthorn (Rhamnus frangula), sundew (Drosera spp.), cottonsedge (Eriophorum virginatum and E. angustifolium), and species of sedge and lichen. The plant easily colonizes bog habitats that have recently been burned. It survives fire with its underground rhizomes.

The roots form mycorrhizal associations.

== Uses ==
The berries are edible and have been used both as a medicine and as a food by various Native American communities. Some Iñupiat cook the cranberry with fish eggs and blubber.

== Bibliography ==
- Ehrlén, Johan; Eriksson, Ove (1991). "Phenological variation in fruit characteristics in vertebrate-dispersed plants". Oecologia. 86 (4): 463–470. Bibcode:1991Oecol..86..463E. doi:10.1007/BF00318311. ISSN 0029-8549. PMID 28313326.
