= Igliauka Eldership =

Eldership of Lithuania

The Igliauka Eldership (Lithuanian: Igliaukos seniūnija) is an eldership of Lithuania, located in the Marijampolė Municipality. In 2021 its population was 1831.
