= Ramsar site =

Wetland sites designated to have international importance by the Ramsar Convention

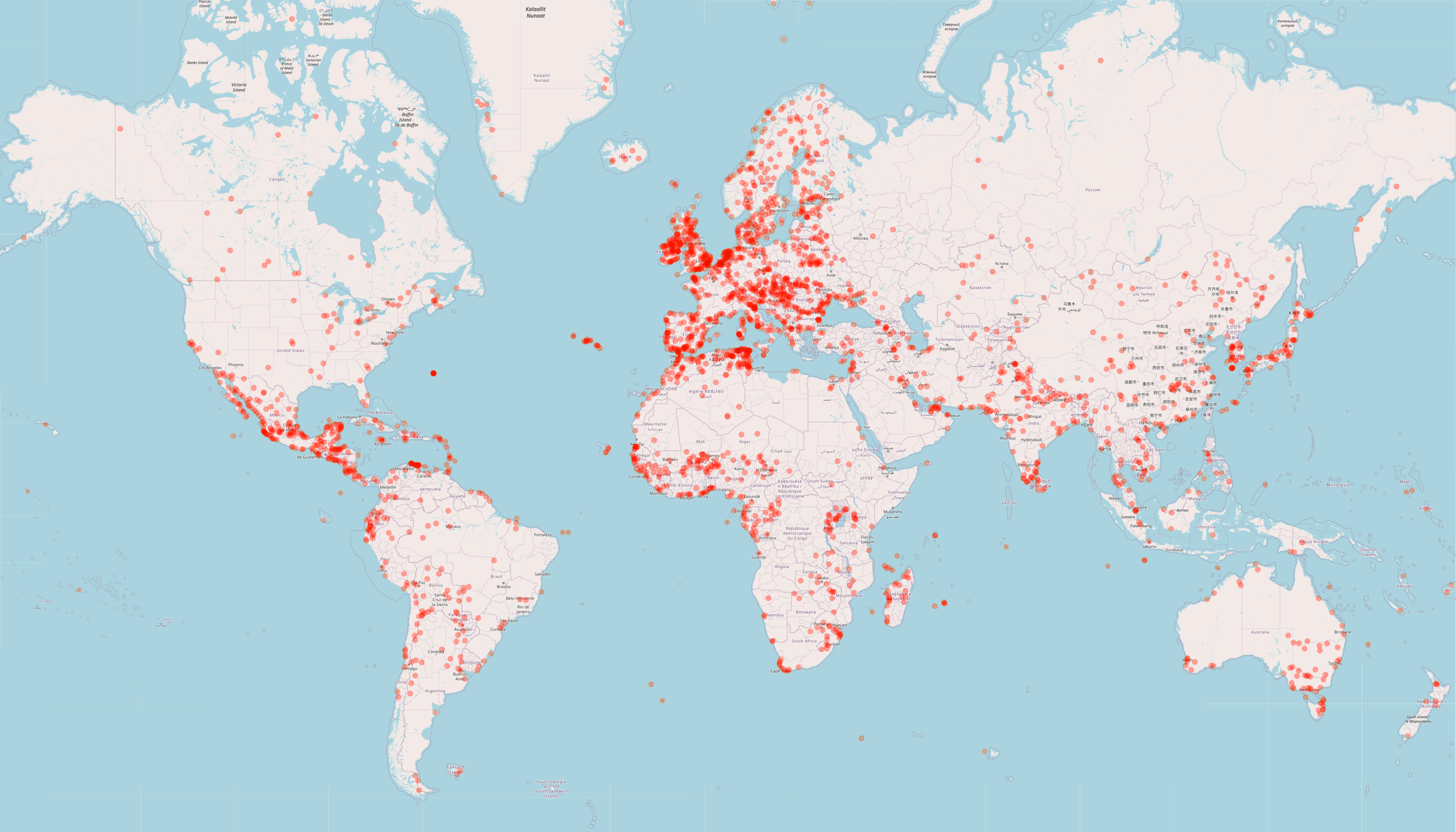
Map of Ramsar sites

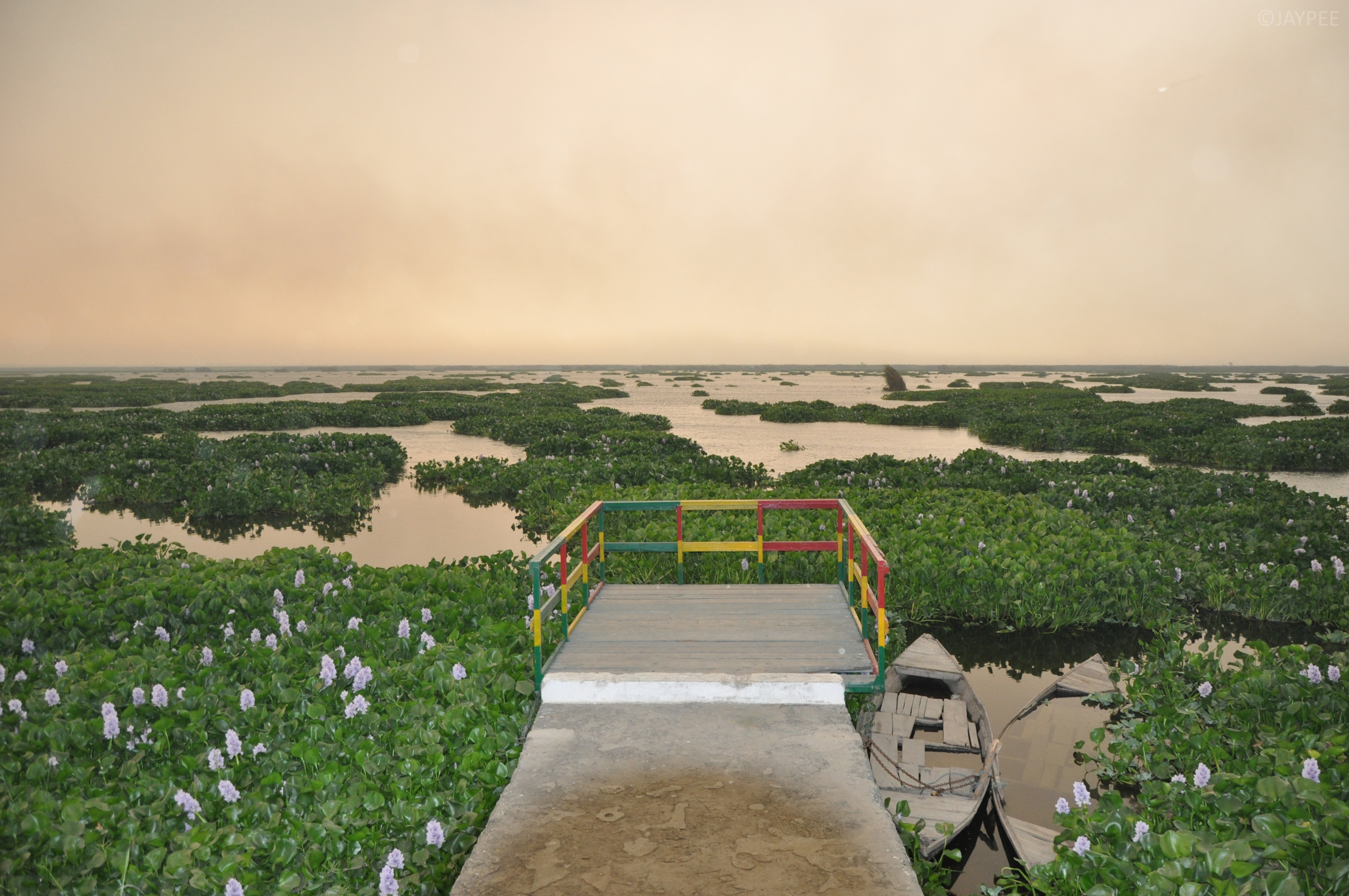
Harike Wetland is a Ramsar site in India

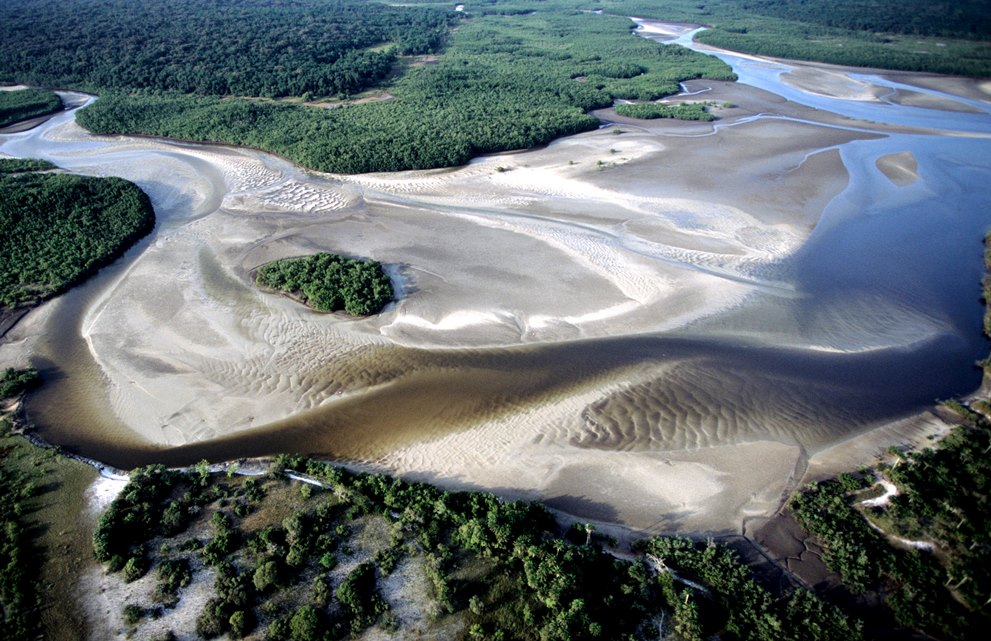
Archipel Bolama-Bijagos Ramsar site in Guinea-Bissau

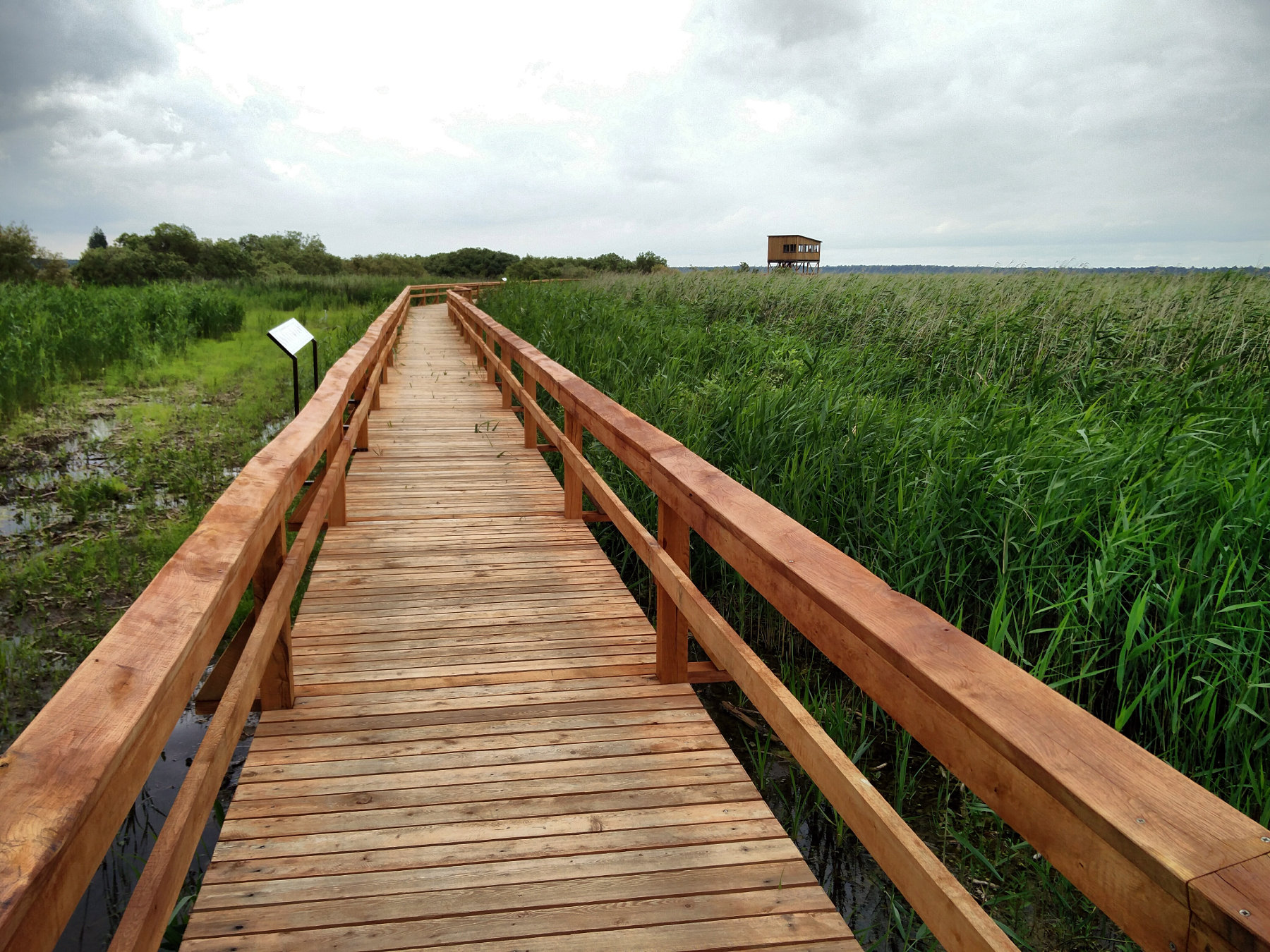
Walkway in Zuvintas Biosphere Reserve

A Ramsar site, also called a Wetland of International Importance, is a wetland site designated under the Ramsar Convention on Wetlands of International Importance Especially as Waterfowl Habitat. The Convention on Wetlands is an international environmental treaty signed on 2 February 1971 in Ramsar, Iran, under the auspices of UNESCO. It came into force on 21 December 1975, when it was ratified by a sufficient number of nations. It provides for national action and international cooperation regarding the conservation of wetlands, and wise sustainable use of their resources. Ramsar treaty participants meet regularly to identify and agree to protect wetlands of international importance, especially those providing waterfowl habitat.

As of November 2026, there are 2,536 Ramsar sites around the world, which protect 253,360,494 hectares (626,067,420 acres), and 172 national governments participate in the convention.

== List of sites ==
The non-profit organisation Wetlands International provides access to the Ramsar database via the Ramsar Sites Information Service.

== Criteria for Ramsar sites ==
A wetland can be considered internationally important if any of the following nine criteria apply:

- Criterion 1: "it contains a representative, rare, or unique example of a natural or near-natural wetland type found within the appropriate biogeographic region."
- Criterion 2: "it supports vulnerable, endangered, or critically endangered species or threatened ecological communities."
- Criterion 3: "it supports populations of plant and/or animal species important for maintaining the biological diversity of a particular biogeographic region."
- Criterion 4: "it supports plant and/or animal species at a critical stage in their life cycles, or provides refuge during adverse conditions."
- Criterion 5: "it regularly supports 20,000 or more waterbirds."
- Criterion 6: "it regularly supports 1% of the individuals in a population of one species or subspecies of waterbird."
- Criterion 7: "it supports a significant proportion of indigenous fish subspecies, species or families, life-history stages, species interactions and/or populations that are representative of wetland benefits and/or values and thereby contributes to global biological diversity."
- Criterion 8: "it is an important source of food for fishes, spawning ground, nursery and/or migration path on which fish stocks, either within the wetland or elsewhere, depend."
- Criterion 9: "it regularly supports 1% of the individuals in a population of one species or subspecies of wetland-dependent non-avian animal species."

== Classification System ==
The Ramsar Classification System for Wetland Type is a wetland classification developed within the Ramsar Convention intended as a means for fast identification of the main types of wetlands for the purposes of the Convention.

=== Marine/coastal wetlands ===
- Saline water:
  - Permanent:
    - (A) Permanent shallow marine waters: Less than 6m deep at low tide; including sea bays and straits
    - (B) Marine subtidal aquatic beds: Underwater vegetation; including kelp beds and sea grass beds, and tropical marine meadows
    - (C) Coral reefs
  - Shores:
    - (D) Rocky marine shores
    - (E) Sand, shingle or pebble shores
- Saline or brackish water:
  - Intertidal:
    - (G) Intertidal mud, sand or salt flats
    - (H) Intertidal marshes
    - (I) Intertidal forested wetlands
  - Lagoons:
    - (J) Coastal brackish/saline lagoons
  - Estuarine waters:
    - (F) Estuarine waters
- Saline, brackish, or fresh water:
  - Subterranean:
    - (Zk(a)) Karst and other subterranean hydrological systems
- Fresh water:
  - Lagoons:
    - (K) Coastal freshwater lagoons

=== Inland wetlands ===
- Fresh water:
  - Flowing water:
    - Permanent:
      - Permanent inland river deltas (L)
      - Permanent rivers/creeks/streams (M)
        - Freshwater springs, oases (Y)
    - Seasonal/intermittent rivers/creeks/streams (N)
  - Lakes/pools:
    - Permanent >8 ha (O)
    - Permanent < 8 ha(Tp)
    - Seasonal / Intermittent > 8 ha (P)
    - Seasonal Intermittent < 8 ha(Ts)
  - Marshes on inorganic soils:
    - Permanent (herb dominated) (Tp)
    - Permanent / Seasonal / Intermittent (shrub dominated)(W)
    - Permanent / Seasonal / Intermittent (tree dominated) (Xf)
    - Seasonal/intermittent (herb dominated) (Ts)
  - Marshes on peat soils:
    - Permanent (non-forested)(U)
    - Permanent (forested)(Xp)
  - Marshes on inorganic or peat soils:
    - Marshes on inorganic or peat soils / High altitude (alpine) (Va)
    - Marshes on inorganic or peat soils / Tundra (Vt)
- Saline, brackish or alkaline waters:
  - Lakes
    - Permanent (Q)
    - Seasonal/intermittent (R)
  - Marshes/pools
    - Permanent (Sp)
    - Seasonal/intermittent (Ss)
- Fresh, saline, brackish or alkaline waters:
  - Geothermal (Zg)
  - Subterranean (Zk(b))

=== Human-made wetlands ===
- (1): Aquaculture ponds
- (2): Ponds (farm and stock ponds, small stock tanks, or area less than 8 ha)
- (3): Irrigated land
- (4): Seasonally flooded agricultural land
- (5): Salt exploitation sites
- (6): Water Storage areas/Reservoirs
- (7): Excavations
- (8): Wastewater treatment areas
- (9): Canals and drainage channels or ditches
- (Zk(c)): human-made karst and other subterranean hydrological systems

== See also ==
- List of parties to the Ramsar Convention
- Montreux Record
- Ramsar sites by country
- Wetlands conservation topics
