= Žuvintas =

Lake in Lithuania

Lake Žuvintas
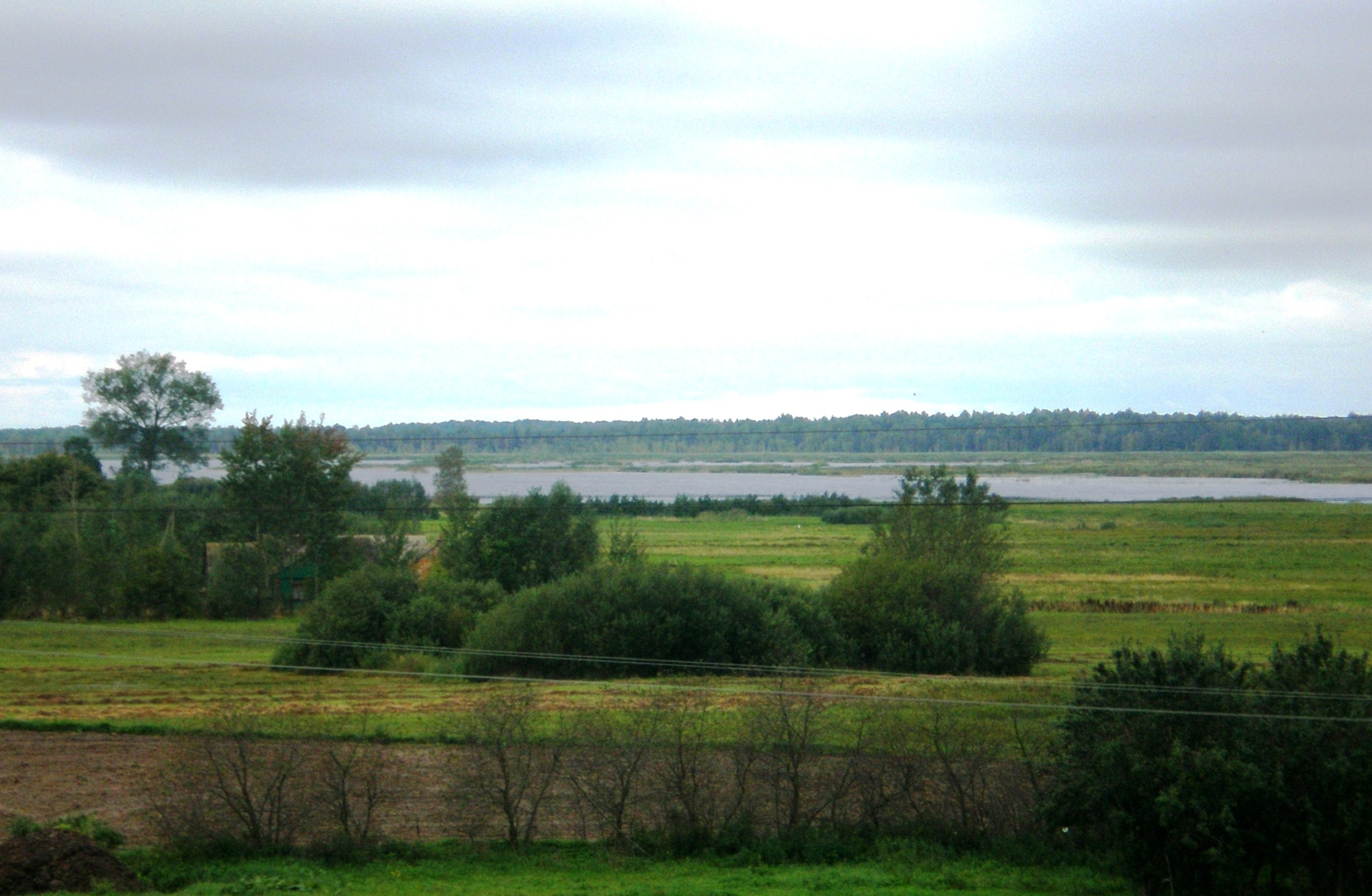
- Žuvintas from Aleknonys village

- Location within Lithuania
- Location: Alytus district
- Coordinates: 54°28′15″N 23°37′43″E
- Primary outflows: Dovinė River
- Basin countries: Lithuania
- Surface area: 9.65 km^{2} (3.73 mi^{2})
- Average depth: 0.6 m (2.0 ft)
- Max. depth: 3 m (9.8 ft)

Ramsar Wetland
- Official name: Zuvintas
- Designated: 4 October 1993
- Reference no.: 628

Lake Žuvintas is a shallow lake in Alytus district, central Lithuania. Area of Žuvintas Lake is 965 ha. It is the shallowest lake in Lithuania with the greatest depth 2.2 m and average only 0.6 m. It is a paradise for water birds, but also faces danger of becoming a swamp.

Lake Žuvintas is found in Žuvintas Biosphere Reserve, Lithuania's oldest nature protection area.
