= Black alder =

Black alder is a common name for several plants and may refer to:

- Alnus glutinosa, native to Europe and widely naturalized
- Ilex verticillata, native to eastern North America
