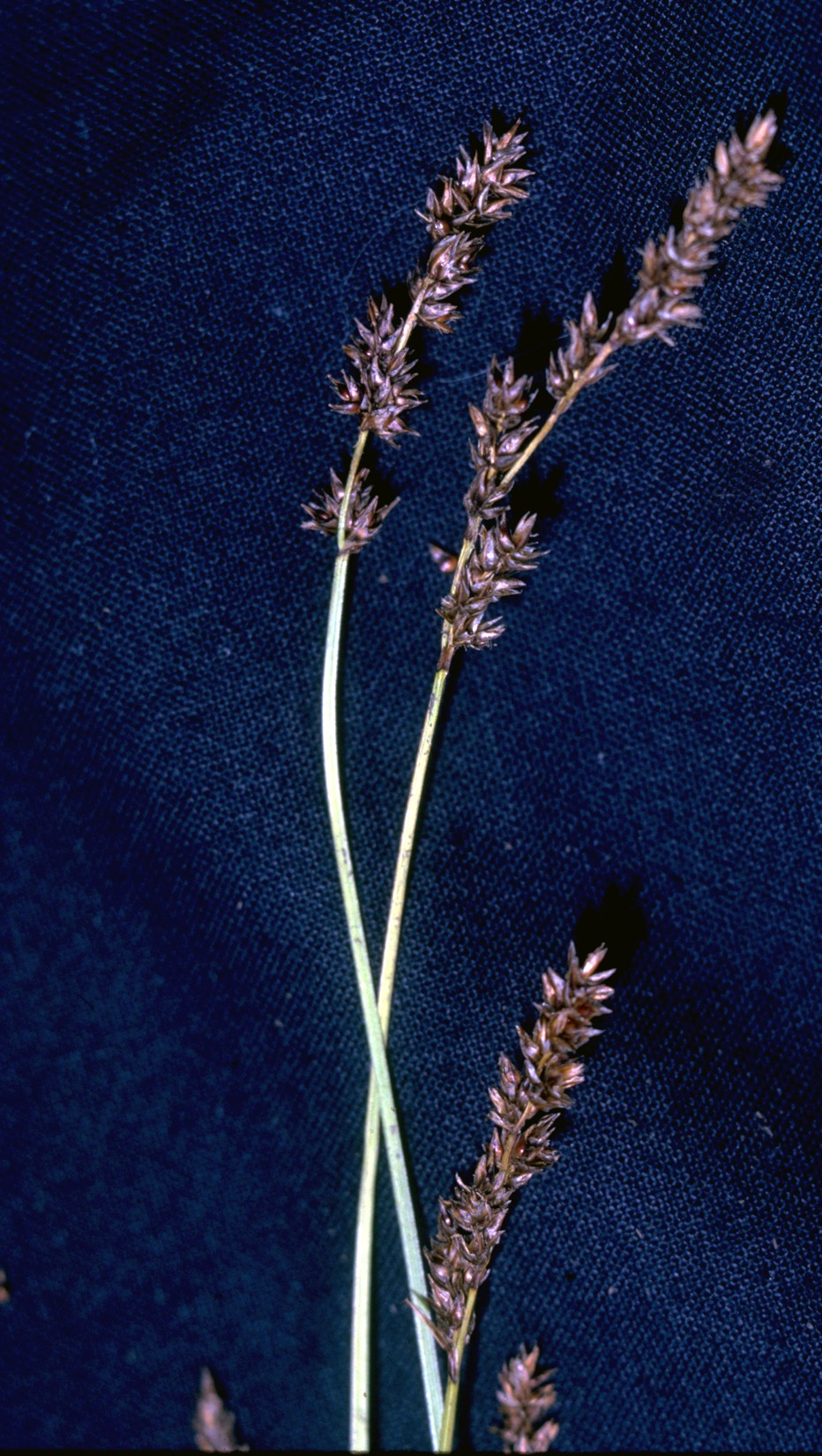

Conservation status
- Least Concern (IUCN 3.1)

Scientific classification
- Kingdom: Plantae
- Clade: Tracheophytes
- Clade: Angiosperms
- Clade: Monocots
- Clade: Commelinids
- Order: Poales
- Family: Cyperaceae
- Genus: Carex
- Species: C. diandra

Binomial name
- Carex diandra Schrank

= Carex diandra =

Species of grass-like plant

Carex diandra is a species of sedge known by the common names lesser tussock-sedge and lesser panicled sedge.

== Distribution ==
It is widely distributed in the Northern Hemisphere, where it can be found throughout North America, Europe, and Asia. It is also known from New Zealand. It grows in a wide variety of wet habitats, including wetlands, meadows, bogs, and lakeshores.

== Description ==
This sedge produces clumps of triangular stems up to 90 centimeters long. The leaves have white-edged, red-dotted sheaths and are up to about 30 centimeters long. The inflorescence is simple or sometimes compound, made up of several clusters of stiff light brown spikes.
