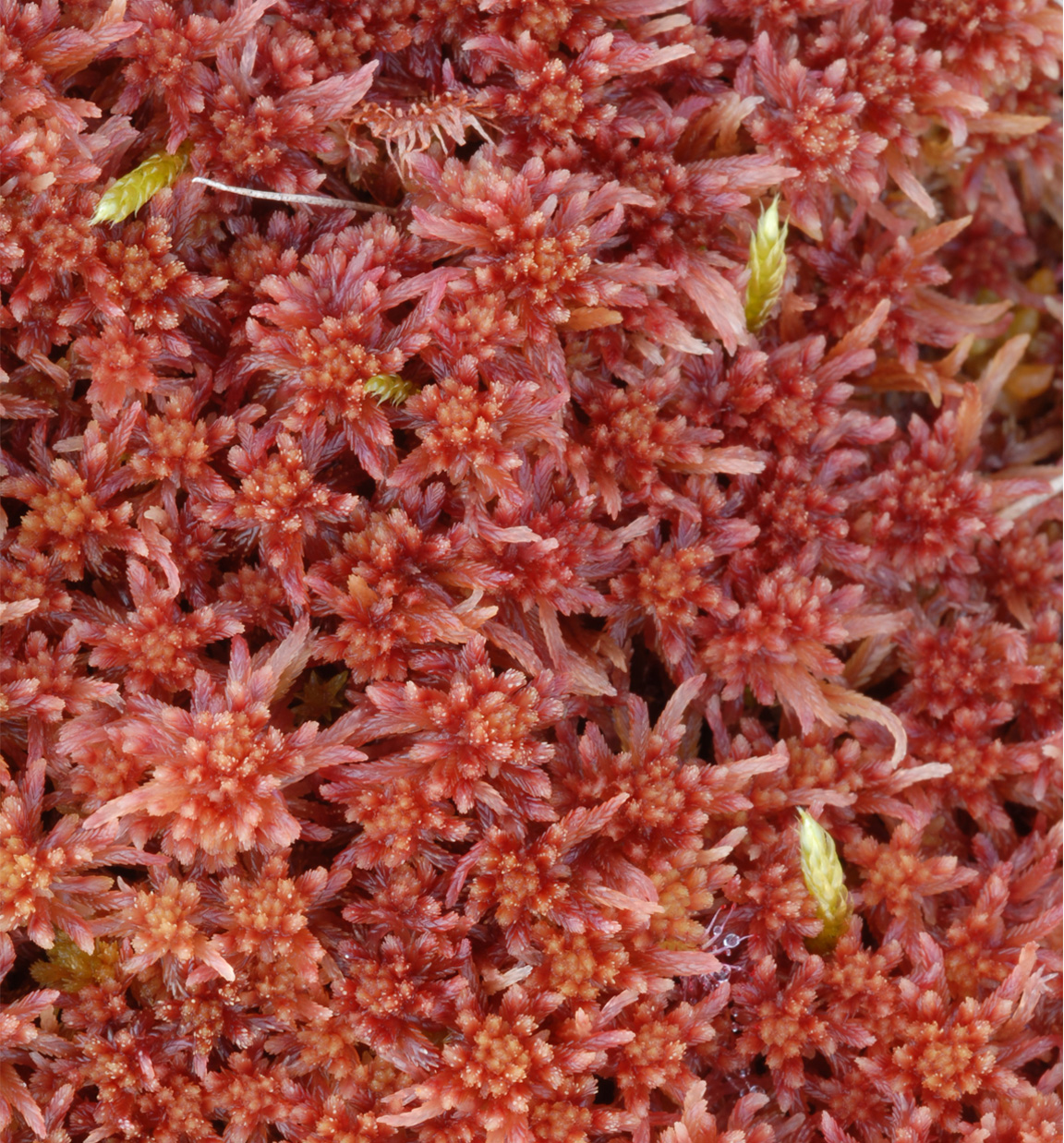
- Close-up view
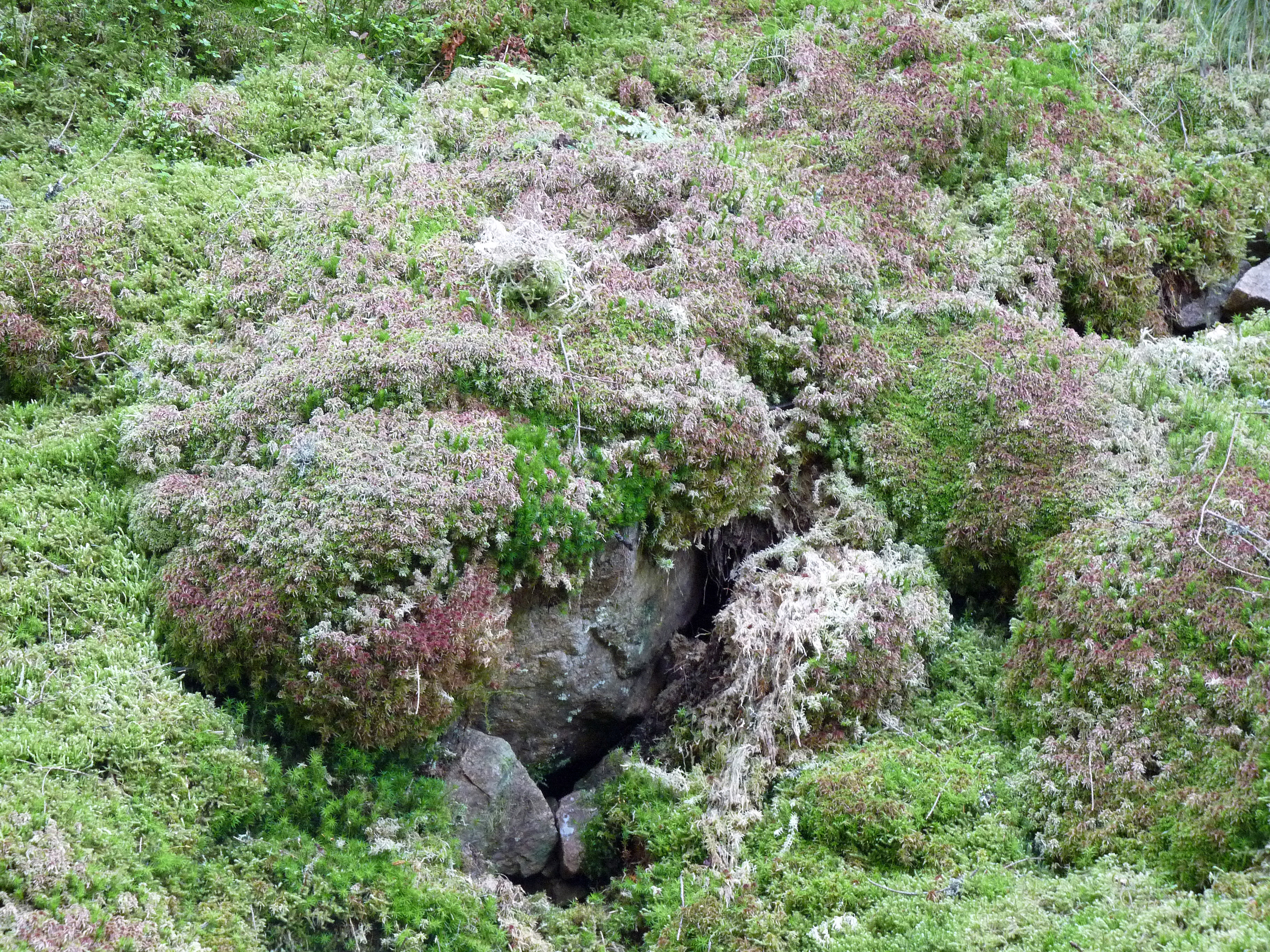
- With other mosses

Scientific classification
- Kingdom: Plantae
- Clade: Embryophytes
- Division: Bryophyta
- Class: Sphagnopsida
- Order: Sphagnales
- Family: Sphagnaceae
- Genus: Sphagnum
- Species: S. rubellum

Binomial name
- Sphagnum rubellum Wilson

Synonyms
- List: Sphagnum acutifolium subsp. rubellum (Wilson) Hérib.; Sphagnum acutifolium var. rubellum (Wilson) Russow; Sphagnum acutifolium var. rubellum (Wilson) Warnst.; Sphagnum acutifolium var. rubrum Bayrh.; Sphagnum acutifolium var. tenellum Schimp.; Sphagnum acutifolium subsp. tenellum (Schimp.) Meyl.; Sphagnum acutifolium var. versicolor Warnst.; Sphagnum acutiforme Schlieph. & Warnst.; Sphagnum acutiforme var. tenellum (Schimp.) Schlieph. & Warnst.; Sphagnum americanum Warnst. ex H.K.G.Paul; Sphagnum capillaceum var. tenellum (Schimp.) A.L.Andrews; Sphagnum capillifolium subsp. rubellum (Wils.) A.Eddy; Sphagnum capillifolium var. rubellum (Wils.) A.Eddy; Sphagnum capillifolium subsp. rubellum (Wilson) M.O.Hill; Sphagnum capillifolium var. tenellum (Schimp.) H.A.Crum; Sphagnum nemoreum var. nitidulum Warnst.; Sphagnum nemoreum var. rubellum (Wilson) Brizi; Sphagnum quinquefarium var. rubellum (Wilson) Warnst.; Sphagnum rubellum var. tenellum (Schimp.) Breidl.; Sphagnum rubellum var. versicolor (Warnst.) Warnst.; Sphagnum schliephackeanum var. tenellum (Schimp.) Roll; Sphagnum tenellum (Schimp.) H.Klinggr.; Sphagnum wilsonii Röll

= Sphagnum rubellum =

Species of moss

Sphagnum rubellum, the red peat moss, is a widespread species of moss in the family Sphagnaceae, native to the cool temperate parts of North America and Eurasia. It is slower growing than its close relative Sphagnum capillifolium.
