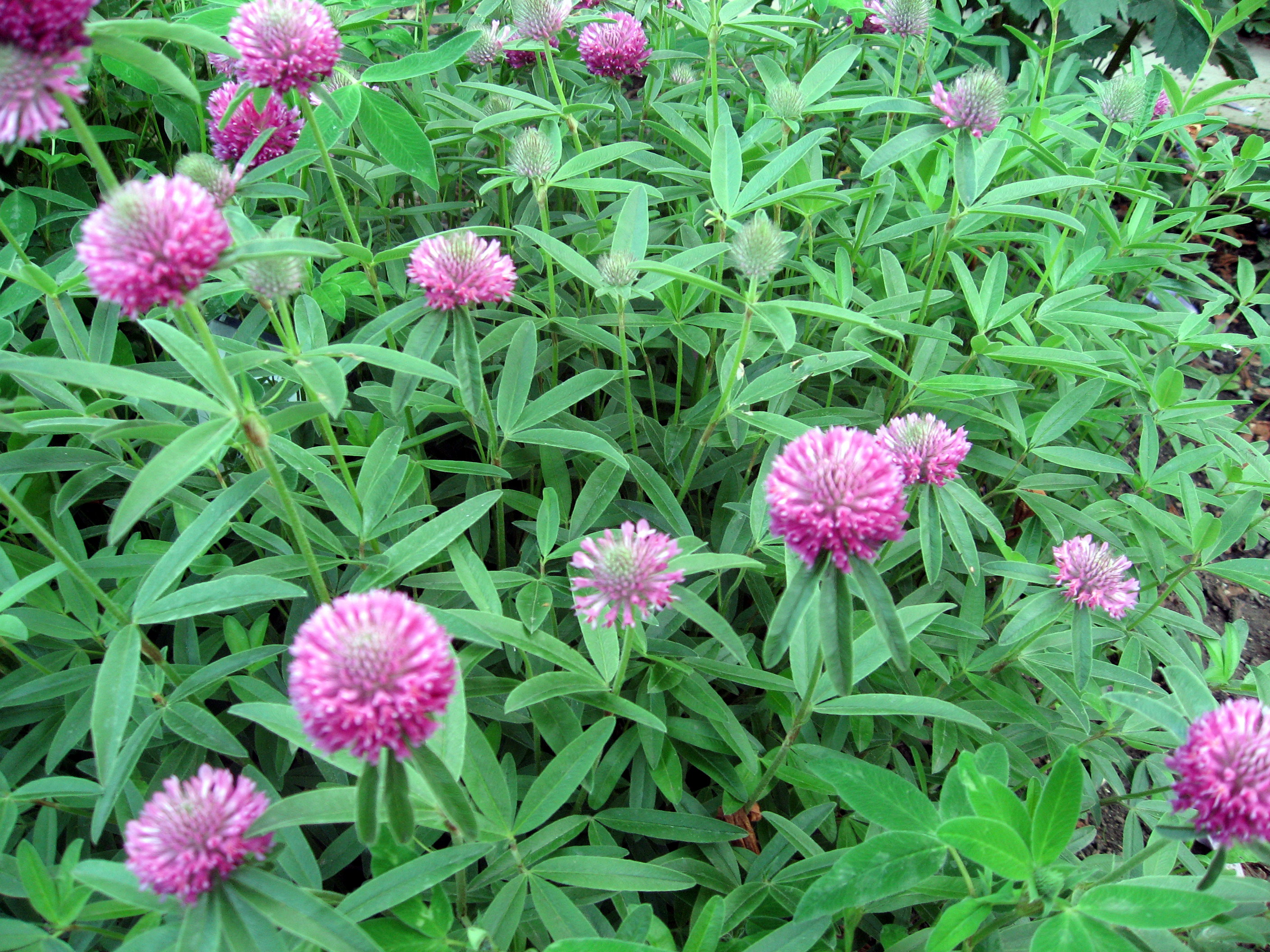
- In bloom

Scientific classification
- Kingdom: Plantae
- Clade: Tracheophytes
- Clade: Angiosperms
- Clade: Eudicots
- Clade: Rosids
- Order: Fabales
- Family: Fabaceae
- Subfamily: Faboideae
- Genus: Trifolium
- Species: T. alpestre

Binomial name
- Trifolium alpestre L.

Synonyms
- List: Trifolium alpestre f. monostachyum (Ser.) Cincovic; Trifolium alpinum Georgi; Trifolium incarnatum Stephan; Trifolium purpureum-majus Gilib.; Trifolium rubens Desc.; Triphylloides nervosa Moench

= Trifolium alpestre =

Species of flowering plant

Trifolium alpestre, the owl-head clover or purple-globe clover, is a species of flowering plant in the family Fabaceae, native to central, southern and Eastern Europe, the Caucasus, Turkey, and Iran. It reproduces both clonally and by seed.
