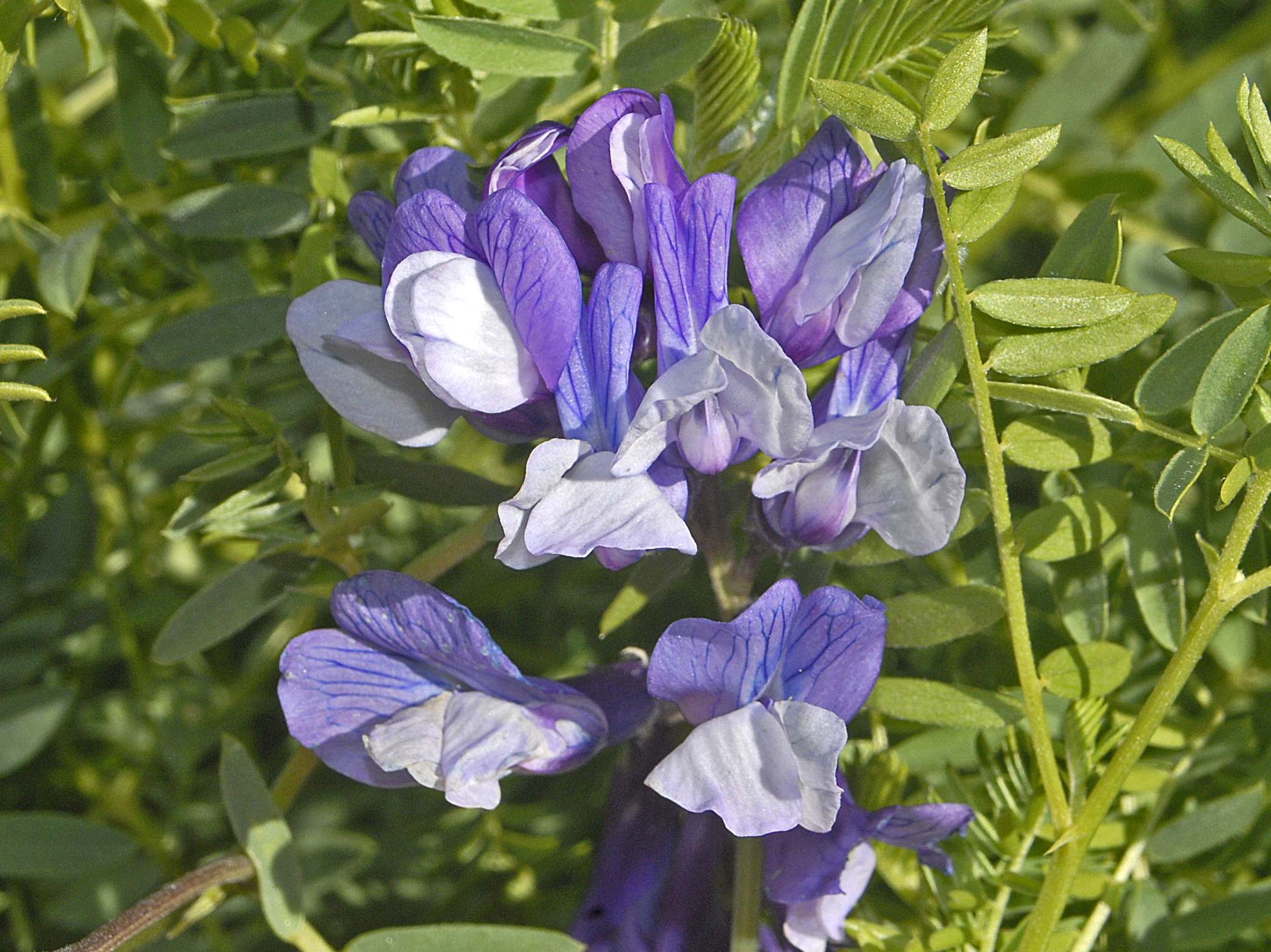
- Flowers of Vicia dumetorum at the Giardino Botanico Alpino Chanousia

Scientific classification
- Kingdom: Plantae
- Clade: Tracheophytes
- Clade: Angiosperms
- Clade: Eudicots
- Clade: Rosids
- Order: Fabales
- Family: Fabaceae
- Subfamily: Faboideae
- Tribe: Fabeae
- Genus: Vicia
- Species: V. dumetorum

Binomial name
- Vicia dumetorum L.

Synonyms
- Vicia variegata Gilib.

= Vicia dumetorum =

Species of legume

Vicia dumetorum is a species of legume in the vetch genus.

== Description ==
Vicia dumetorum can reach a height of 60–200 centimetres (24–79 in). This herbaceous perennial, erect plant is quite rare and variable. Leaves are pinnate, with 3-5 pairs of ovate leaflets, 1.5–4 centimetres (0.59–1.57 in) long. It produces stalked clusters with 3-12 bluish-violet flowers. They bloom from May to June.

== Distribution ==
This species is present in Central, Northern and Eastern Europe and in the Western Asia.

== Habitat ==
Vicia dumetorum can be found in calcareous mountainous woodland, in deciduous, open woodlands and in hedgerows at elevation of 0–1,000 metres (0–3,281 ft) above sea level. The name of the species comes from the Latin 'dumetum' (bush, hedge, bush) with reference to the habitat.
