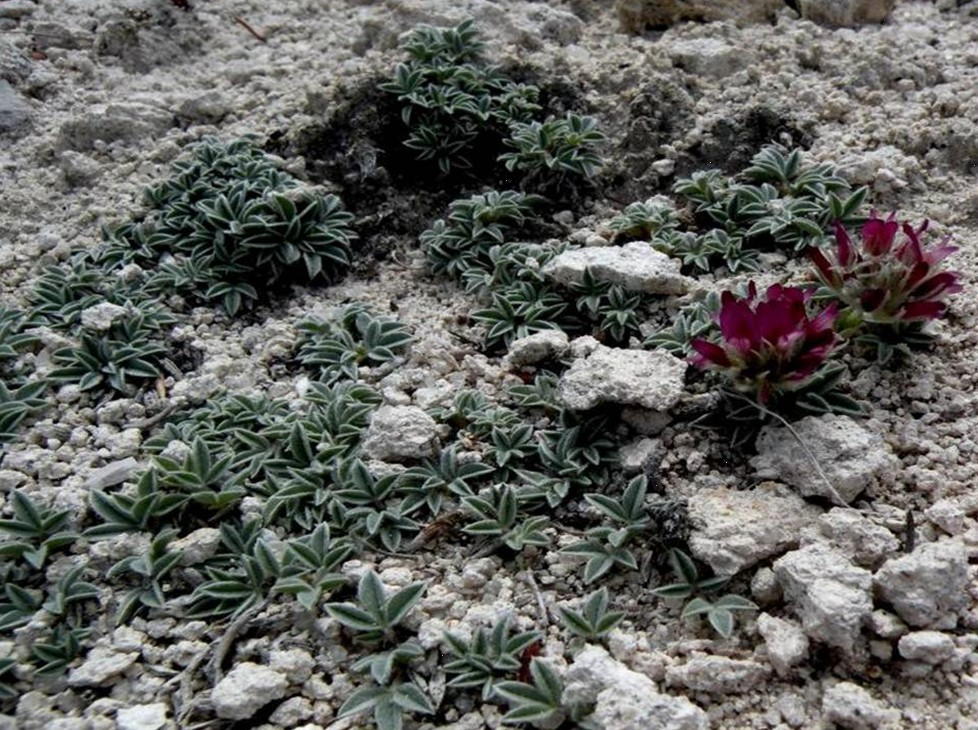

Conservation status
- Critically Imperiled (NatureServe)

Scientific classification
- Kingdom: Plantae
- Clade: Embryophytes
- Clade: Tracheophytes
- Clade: Spermatophytes
- Clade: Angiosperms
- Clade: Eudicots
- Clade: Rosids
- Order: Fabales
- Family: Fabaceae
- Subfamily: Faboideae
- Genus: Trifolium
- Species: T. friscanum

Binomial name
- Trifolium friscanum (S.L. Welsh) S.L. Welsh

= Trifolium friscanum =

Species of flowering plant

Trifolium friscanum is a rare species of flowering plant in the legume family known by the common name Frisco clover.

== Description ==
This is a low-growing dwarf plant with a taproot and woody stem. It is no more than 3 cm (1.2 in) tall. Each leaf is made up of three leaflets coated in silvery hairs. The inflorescence contains 4–9 reddish purple flowers.

== Taxonomy ==
It was originally described as a variety of Trifolium andersonii in 1978, but was elevated to species status in 1993. It occurs over 250 km (160 mi) away from the nearest T. andersonii.

== Distribution and habitat ==
It is endemic to the US state of Utah, where it is known only from Beaver and Millard Counties. It is found growing on the San Francisco Mountains, Beaver Lake Mountains, Wah Wah Mountains and Tunnel Springs Mountains. Most individuals live in the San Francisco Mountains, where the highest point is called Frisco Peak.

This plant grows in pinyon–juniper and sagebrush ecosystems. Other plants in the habitat include Ephedra viridis (Mormon tea), Gutierrezia sarothrae (snakeweed), Cercocarpus intricatus (dwarf mountain-mahogany), and Petradoria pumila (rock goldenrod). The local region is home to other rare plants, including Eriogonum soredium (Frisco buckwheat) and Lepidium ostleri (Ostler's peppergrass).

Frisco clover is known as a "narrow endemic" because it grows on a particular substrate: gravelly and bouldery volcanic soils, Ordovician limestone, and dolomite.

== Conservation ==
There are only five populations of this plant. The total population of the plant is not certain because it is difficult to count individuals of this mound-forming species. Also, some occur on private property where access is restricted.

The main two threats to the species' survival are mining and nonnative species. Mining has occurred in the region for a long time, as the substrates are rich in silver, zinc, lead, gold, and copper. Gravel quarrying has also occurred. There are many old mine shafts in the area. Most mining has ceased now, but some local areas are vulnerable to continuing mining activity. Three of the five remaining populations of the plant are located at mining sites.

Introduced plant species are also a threat to this species. The most notorious is Bromus tectorum, cheatgrass. It grows in the area, and the aforementioned mining activity actually encourages its spread. Cheatgrass encourages fire in this area, which is not fire-adapted.
