= Goldenrod =

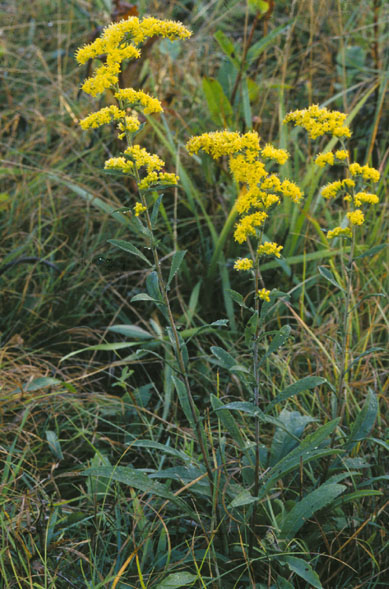
Solidago nemoralis, old field goldenrod

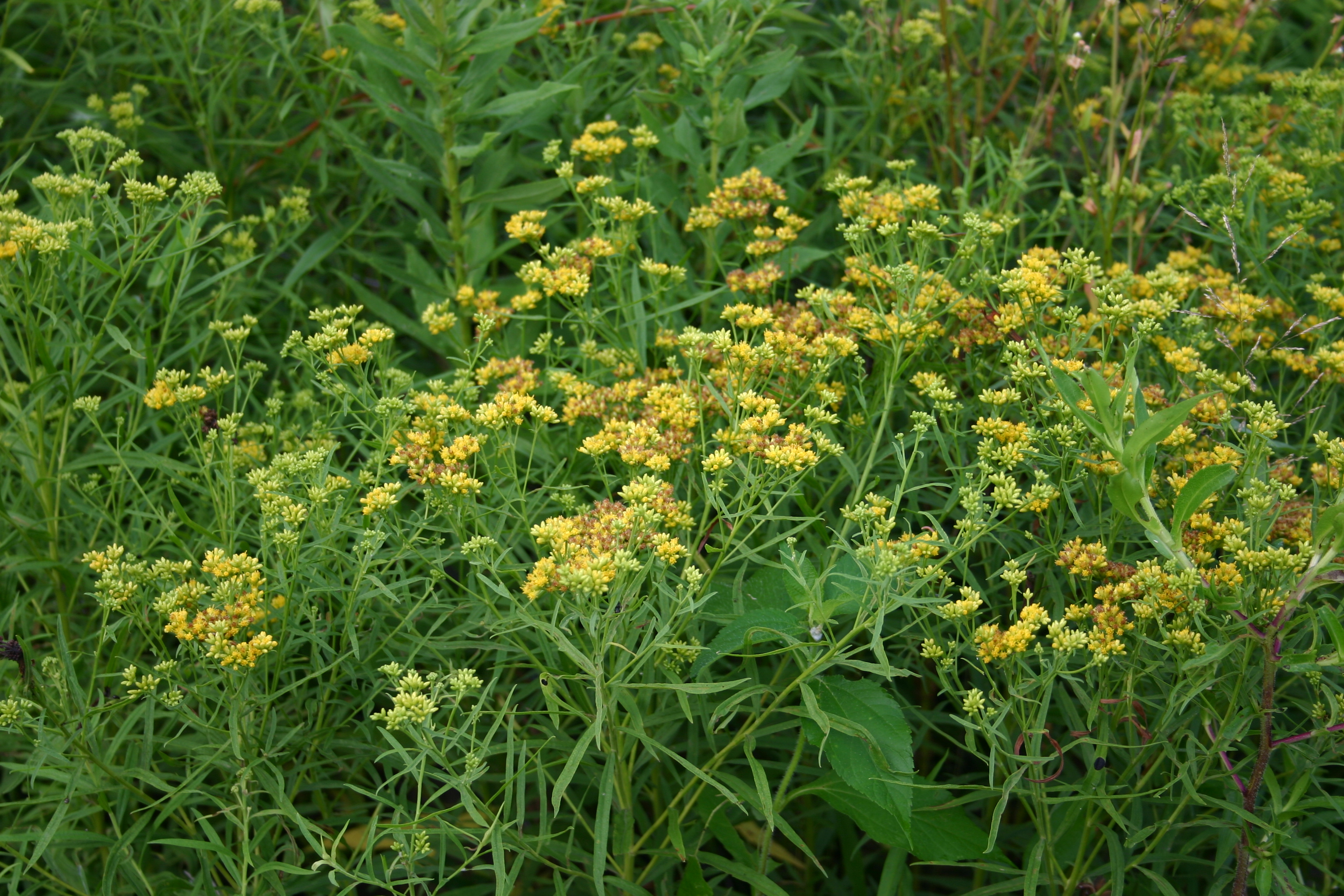
Euthamia graminifolia, grass-leaved goldenrod

A field of goldenrod in the Midwestern United States.

Goldenrod is a common name for many species of flowering plants in the sunflower family, Asteraceae, commonly in reference to the genus Solidago.

Several genera, such as Euthamia, were formerly included in a broader concept of the genus Solidago. Some authors treat Oligoneuron, the flat-topped goldenrods, as a separate genus than Solidago, while others consider it a section: Solidago sect. Ptarmicoidei.

Goldenrods can be used as a sustainable method to enrich soil with nitrogen. With an increase of nitrogen levels, there can then be an increase of vegetative growth.

Plants known as goldenrods include:

- Bigelowia spp., rayless goldenrods, 2 species native to the Southeastern United States
- Cuniculotinus gramineus, Panamint rock goldenrod
- Euthamia spp., flat-topped goldenrods or grass-leaved goldenrods, 5 species native to North America
- Gundlachia triantha, Trans-Pecos desert goldenrod
- Lorandersonia microcephala, small-headed heath goldenrod
- Medranoa palmeri, Texas desert goldenrod
- Petradoria pumila, rock goldenrod
- Solidago spp., goldenrods, around 120 species native to the Americas, northern Africa, Europe, Asia
