= Rock goldenrod =

Rock goldenrod is a common name for several plants and may refer to:

- Petradoria pumila, native to the western United States
- Solidago rupestris, native to the eastern United States
