= Ethmia semitenebrella =

Scientific classification
- Kingdom: Animalia
- Phylum: Arthropoda
- Class: Insecta
- Order: Lepidoptera
- Family: Depressariidae
- Genus: Ethmia
- Species: E. semitenebrella

Binomial name
- Ethmia semitenebrella Dyar, 1902

Species of moth

Ethmia semitenebrella is a moth in the family Depressariidae. It is found in North America from Colorado, Utah, New Mexico and Nuevo León in Mexico to Arizona and southern and eastern California.

The length of the forewings is 10.1–14.3 mm (0.40–0.56 in). The ground color of the forewings is dark gray on the costal half and whitish gray on dorsal half. The costal half usually has considerable whitish overscaling between the veins resulting in longitudinal streaks, which are more well defined beyond the middle. The ground color of the hindwings is whitish, becoming pale brownish on the apical half. Adults are on wing from April to August in two generations per year.

The larvae feed on Cercocarpus ledifolius and probably other Cercocarpus species.
