= Xylothamia =

Genus of flowering plants

Xylothamia, the desert goldenrods, is a formerly accepted genus of flowering plants in the family Asteraceae. Until 2003, it was held to contain nine species of shrubs native to the deserts of Mexico and the southwestern United States. As of May 2024, Plants of the World Online divided the nine former species of Xylothamia among Aquilula, Gundlachia, and Medranoa.

== Taxonomy ==
The genus Xylothamia was first described in 1990 with nine species. Molecular phylogenetic studies subsequently showed that these fell into two clades. Four species, including the type species of Xylothamia, were most closely related to the Caribbean genus Gundlachia, and were transferred to that genus by Lowell E. Urbatsch and Roland P. Roberts in 2004. As of May 2024, Plants of the World Online accepted the transfer, and treated Xylothamia as a synonym of Gundlachia. Urbatsch and Roberts divided the remaining five species between four genera, Neonesomia with two species, and Chihuahuana, Medranoa, and Xylovirgata with one species each. In 2007, Guy L. Nesom considered that four separate genera were not justified, even though there were morphological differences among them, and placed all five species in Medranoa. Nesom later transferred one of the species placed in Gundlachia, Gundlachia riskindii, to the monotypic genus Aquilula. As of May 2024, Plants of the World Online accepted these placements, dividing the nine former species of Xylothamia among Aquilula, Gundlachia, and Medranoa.

All nine species belong in the subtribe Solidagininae.

=== Species ===
As of May 2024, Plants of the World Online divided the nine former species of Xylothamia among Aquilula, Gundlachia, and Medranoa.

Species accepted in Aquilula:

- Xylothamia riskindii (B.L.Turner & G.Langford) G.L.Nesom = Aquilula riskindii

Species accepted in Gundlachia:

- Xylothamia diffusa Benth.) G.L.Nesom = Gundlachia diffusa
- Xylothamia triantha (S.F.Blake) G.L.Nesom = Gundlachia triantha
- Xylothamia truncata G.L.Nesom = Gundlachia truncata

Species accepted in Medranoa:

- Xylothamia johnstonii G.L.Nesom = Medranoa johnstonii
- Xylothamia palmeri (A.Gray) G.L.Nesom = Medranoa palmeri
- Xylothamia parrasana (S.F.Blake) G.L.Nesom = Medranoa parrasana
- Xylothamia pseudobaccharis (S.F.Blake) G.L.Nesom = Medranoa pseudobaccharis
- Xylothamia purpusii (Brandegee) G.L.Nesom = Medranoa purpusii
