= Ethmia discostrigella =

Scientific classification
- Kingdom: Animalia
- Phylum: Arthropoda
- Clade: Pancrustacea
- Class: Insecta
- Order: Lepidoptera
- Family: Depressariidae
- Genus: Ethmia
- Species: E. discostrigella

Binomial name
- Ethmia discostrigella (Chambers, 1877)

Synonyms
- Anesychia discostrigella Chambers, 1877; Psecadia subcaerulea Walsingham, 1880

Species of moth

Ethmia discostrigella, the mountain-mahogany moth, is a moth in the family Depressariidae. It is found from the western United States, south into Mexico.

The length of the forewings is 10.4–14.7 mm (0.41–0.58 in). The ground color of the forewings is dark gray, overlaid with scattered whitish scales. The ground color of the hindwings is pale gray, becoming whitish ocherous toward the anal area. Adults of the nominate subspecies are on wing from April to September in multiple generations per year in the south. Subspecies subcaerulea is on wing from March to September, also in multiple generations.

The larvae of subspecies discostrigella feed on Cercocarpus ledifolius and probably other Cercocarpus species. The larvae of subspecies subcaerulea feed on Cercocarpus betuloides and Cercocarpus minutifloru.

== Subspecies ==
- Ethmia discostrigella discostrigella (Great Basin area of eastern Oregon and California, east of the Sierra Nevada. It is also found from south-western Idaho, Nevada and Utah, southward through Colorado, eastern New Mexico and western Texas, into Chihuahua and Nuevo León in Mexico)
- Ethmia discostrigella subcaerulea (Walsingham, 1880) (Cismontane California, west slope of the Sierra Nevada and Coast Ranges to southern California and Baja California)
