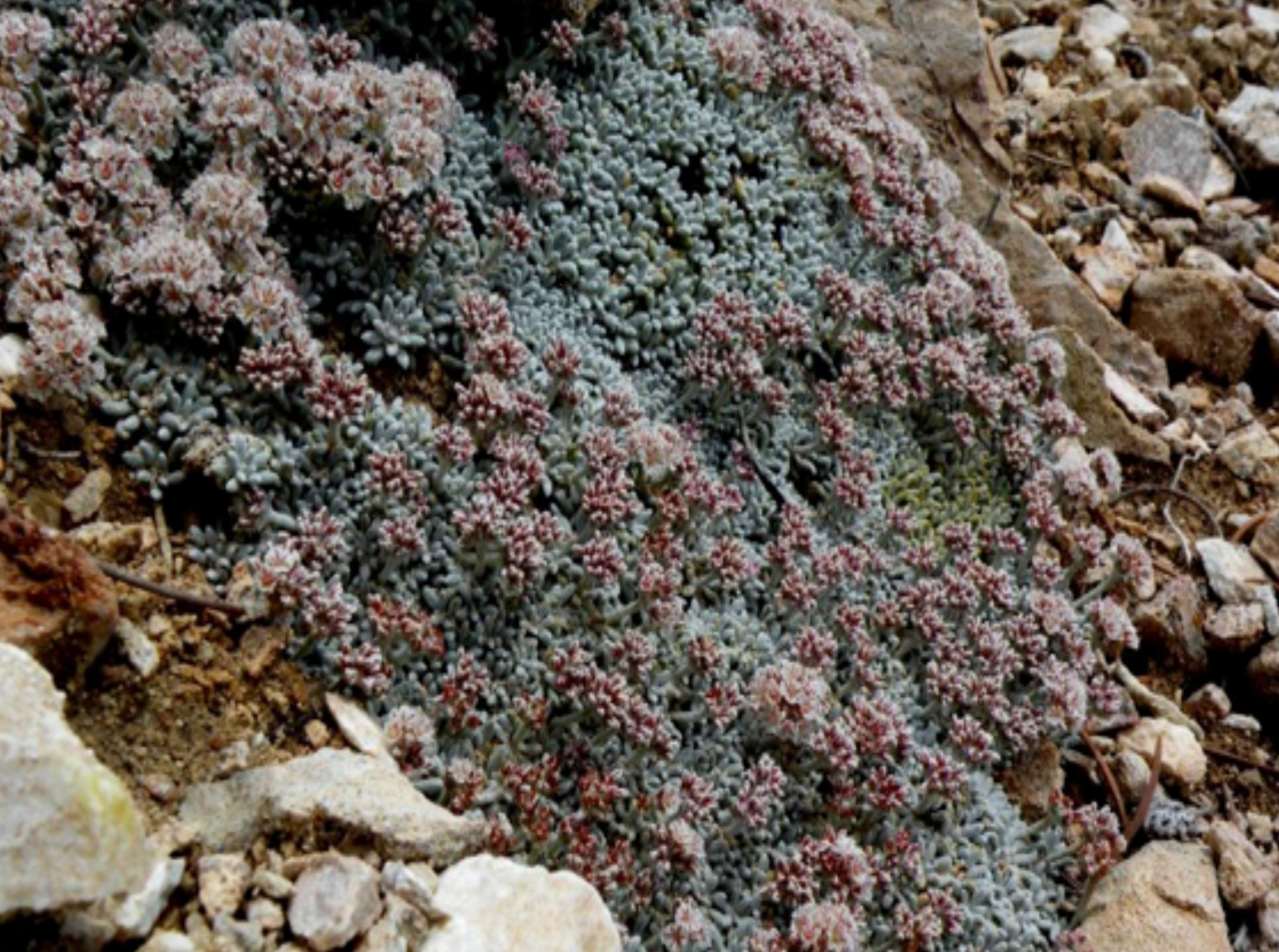

Conservation status
- Critically Imperiled (NatureServe)

Scientific classification
- Kingdom: Plantae
- Clade: Tracheophytes
- Clade: Angiosperms
- Clade: Eudicots
- Order: Caryophyllales
- Family: Polygonaceae
- Genus: Eriogonum
- Species: E. soredium

Binomial name
- Eriogonum soredium Reveal

= Eriogonum soredium =

Species of wild buckwheat

Eriogonum soredium is a species of wild buckwheat known by the common name Frisco buckwheat. It is endemic to Utah in the United States, where it is known only from Beaver County. There are four populations, all located in the San Francisco Mountains. It is a candidate for federal protection.

This low-growing perennial herb reaches about 4 centimeters in height, forming mounds up to 50 centimeters wide. The woolly rounded or oval leaves are up to 5 millimeters long and 2 millimeters wide. The white or pinkish flowers are up to 3 millimeters wide and are borne in clusters shaped like "drumsticks". The seeds are 2 to 2.5 millimeters wide. Blooming occurs in June through August.

This plant grows only on soils made up of Ordovician limestone in the southern San Francisco Mountains of Utah. There are 845 acres of this substrate in the mountains, but the plant only occupies 52 acres of the available habitat. Its entire range is about 5 square miles. The four known populations are all located on privately owned land. It is not known how many individual plants exist; population estimates vary widely.

Other plants in the local habitat include ephedra (Ephedra sp.), snakeweed (Gutierrezia sarothrae), dwarf mountain-mahogany (Cercocarpus intricatus), and rock goldenrod (Petradoria pumila). It may grow alongside another rare species, Frisco clover (Trifolium friscanum). The habitat is generally pinyon-juniper woodland and sagebrush.

Threats to this rare species include mining, which has occurred in the San Francisco Mountains for a long time. Over 90% of the buckwheat's habitat is within mining claims. The land that supports the plant is littered with tailings and there are many shafts and access roads in the vicinity. These have degraded the habitat. The Horn Silver Mine is located in the area; this was one of the largest sources of silver in America in the nineteenth century. Historical copper mines are located nearby as well. There is little metal mining occurring today, but there is continued interest in precious metals in these mountains. Gravel and limestone quarrying does occur currently, and directly impacts the species' habitat.

Other threats include introduced species of plants such as cheatgrass (Bromus tectorum). This grass increases the frequency of wildfire. The buckwheat is not believed to be tolerant of fire, as fire is infrequent in the pristine habitat in which it evolved. The buckwheat is also threatened by the small size of its populations, making it vulnerable to extirpation, as well as climate change and drought.
