= Medranoa =

Scientific classification
- Kingdom: Plantae
- Clade: Tracheophytes
- Clade: Angiosperms
- Clade: Eudicots
- Clade: Asterids
- Order: Asterales
- Family: Asteraceae
- Subfamily: Asteroideae
- Tribe: Astereae
- Genus: Medranoa; Urbatsch & R.P.Roberts

Species
- See text.

Synonyms
- Chihuahuana Urbatsch & R.P.Roberts; Neonesomia Urbatsch & R.P.Roberts; Xylovirgata Urbatsch & R.P.Roberts

Genus of flowering plant

Medranoa is a genus of flowering plant in the family Asteraceae, native to northeastern Mexico and Texas. The genus was established in 2004, initially with a single species. It was expanded to five species in 2007, incorporating species formerly placed in Xylothamia, and then in Chihuahuana, Neonesomia, and Xylovirgata.

== Taxonomy ==
The genus Xylothamia was first described in 1990 with nine species. Molecular phylogenetic studies subsequently showed that these fell into two clades. Four species, including the type species of Xylothamia, were most closely related to the Caribbean genus Gundlachia, and were transferred to that genus by Lowell E. Urbatsch and Roland P. Roberts in 2004. As of May 2024, Plants of the World Online accepted the transfer, and treated Xylothamia as a synonym of Gundlachia. Urbatsch and Roberts divided the remaining five species between four genera, Neonesomia with two species, and Chihuahuana, Medranoa, and Xylovirgata with one species each. In 2007, Guy L. Nesom considered that four separate genera were not justified, even though there were morphological differences among them, and placed all five species in Medranoa. As of May 2024, Plants of the World Online accepted this placement, so that it divides the nine former species of Xylothamia between Gundlachia and Medranoa.

=== Species ===
As of March 2024, Plants of the World Online accepted the following species:

- Medranoa johnstonii (G.L.Nesom) G.L.Nesom, syns Xylothamia johnstonii, Neonesomia johnstonii
- Medranoa palmeri (A.Gray) G.L.Nesom, syns Xylothamia palmeri, Neonesomia palmeri
- Medranoa parrasana (S.F.Blake) Urbatsch & R.P.Roberts, syn. Xylothamia parrasana
- Medranoa pseudobaccharis (S.F.Blake) G.L.Nesom, syns Xylothamia pseudobaccharis, Xylovirgata pseudobaccharis
- Medranoa purpusii (Brandegee) G.L.Nesom, syns Xylothamia purpusii, Chihuahuana purpusii
