= Beckwithia =

Beckwithia may refer to:

- Beckwithia (arthropod), an arthropod genus in the order Aglaspidida
- Beckwithia (plant), a plant genus in the family Ranunculaceae
