= Quercus flocculenta =

Conservation status
- Endangered (IUCN 3.1)

Scientific classification
- Kingdom: Plantae
- Clade: Embryophytes
- Clade: Tracheophytes
- Clade: Spermatophytes
- Clade: Angiosperms
- Clade: Eudicots
- Clade: Rosids
- Order: Fagales
- Family: Fagaceae
- Genus: Quercus
- Subgenus: Quercus subg. Quercus
- Section: Quercus sect. Lobatae
- Species: Q. flocculenta

Binomial name
- Quercus flocculenta C.H.Mull.

Synonyms
- Quercus flocculenta var. typica A.Camus; Quercus flocculenta f. incisa C.H.Mull.; Quercus flocculenta f. oblongifolia C.H.Mull.

Species of oak tree

Quercus flocculenta is an endangered species of oak in the family Fagaceae, native to northeastern Mexico. It is endemic to the Sierra Madre Oriental of Nuevo León state.

== Description ==
Quercus flocculenta is a deciduous shrub or small tree.

== Range and habitat ==
Quercus flocculenta grows on the western slope of the northern Sierra Madre Oriental, in the state of Nuevo León.

It grows in montane chaparral and mixed pine forests from 2,000 to 2,900 meters elevation. It grows in association with Juniperus deppeana, Pinus cembroides, Rhus virens, Cercocarpus mojadensis, Ceanothus buxifolius, Agave americana, and Garrya ovata.

== Conservation ==
Quercus flocculenta has a small geographic range. Its distribution is mostly on private land, and no detailed surveys of its population have been done. It is threatened with habitat loss from logging of timber trees, human-caused fires, and land use change from livestock grazing and other human activities. The city of Monterrey has expanded onto its former habitat. Its conservation status is assessed as endangered.

Populations of the species are protected in Cumbres de Monterrey National Park.
