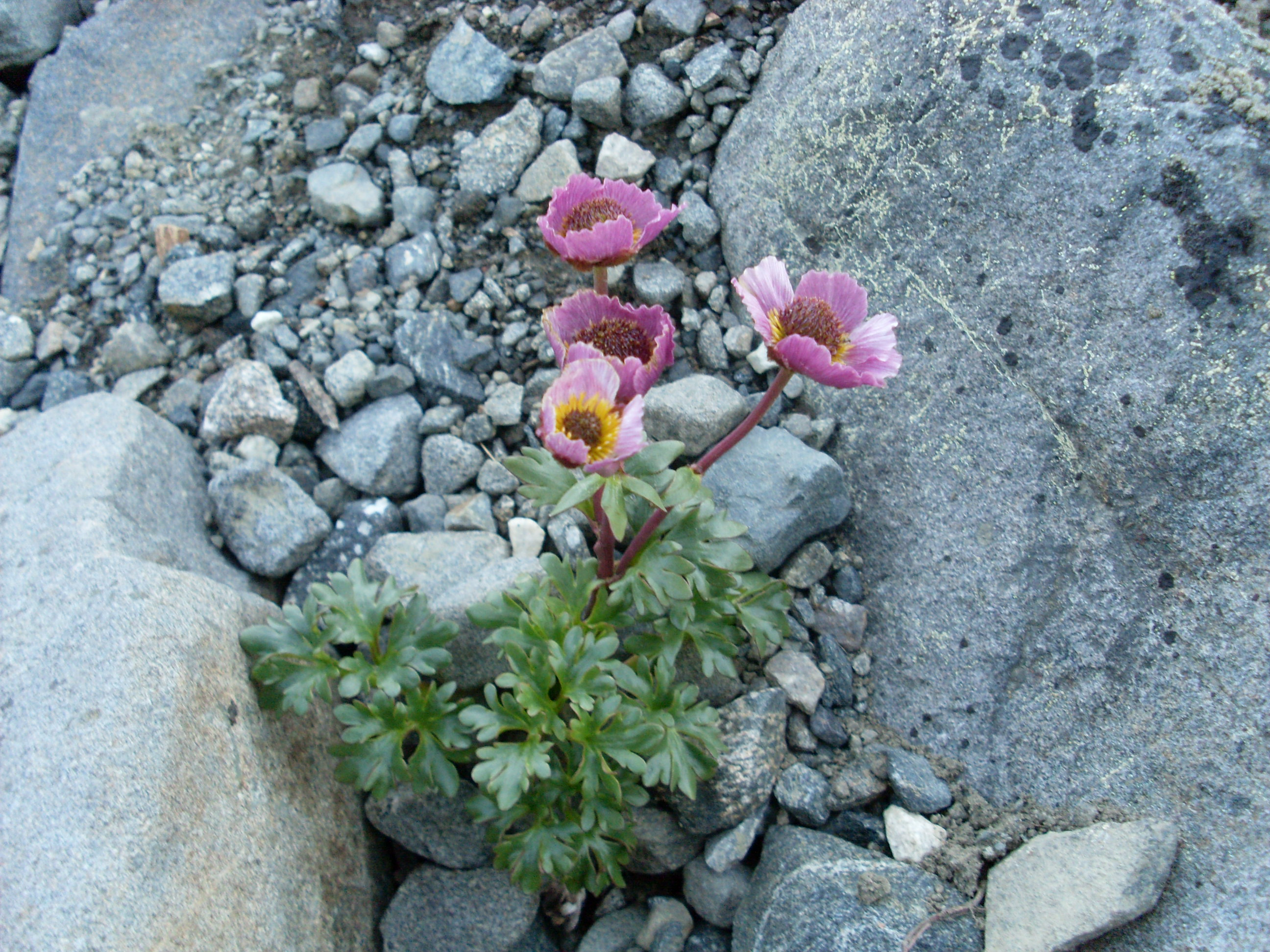
- Beckwithia glacialis

Scientific classification
- Kingdom: Plantae
- Clade: Tracheophytes
- Clade: Angiosperms
- Clade: Eudicots
- Order: Ranunculales
- Family: Ranunculaceae
- Subfamily: Ranunculoideae
- Tribe: Ranunculeae
- Genus: Beckwithia; Jeps.

= Beckwithia (plant) =

Genus of flowering plants

Beckwithia is a genus of plants of the family Ranunculaceae. Most botanists consider it synonymous to a clade consisting of Ranunculus glacialis and Ranunculus andersonii. B. glacialis has several distinct forms that may also be considered subspecies or closely related species. However, molecular studies have supported the placement of B. glacialis and B. camissonis within Ranunculus, distant from B. andersonii.

== Taxa ==
- Beckwithia andersonii (A.Gray) Jeps. (= Ranunculus andersonii), Anderson's buttercup, native to the Western United States
- Beckwithia glacialis subsp. glacialis (L.) Á.Löve & D.Löve (= Ranunculus glacialis), the glacier buttercup, occurring in boreal and alpine areas of Europe (including Iceland, Jan Mayen and Svalbard)
- Beckwithia glacialis subsp. alaskensis Jurtz., D. Murray & S. Kelso (= Ranunculus glacialis subsp. alaskensis), Alaskan glacier buttercup, that is endemic in the Kigluaik Mountains of the Seward Peninsula, Alaska
- Beckwithia camissonis (Schltdl.) Tolm. (= Ranunculus glacialis subsp. camissonis), that occurs on either side of the Bering Strait, in Siberia and in Alaska
