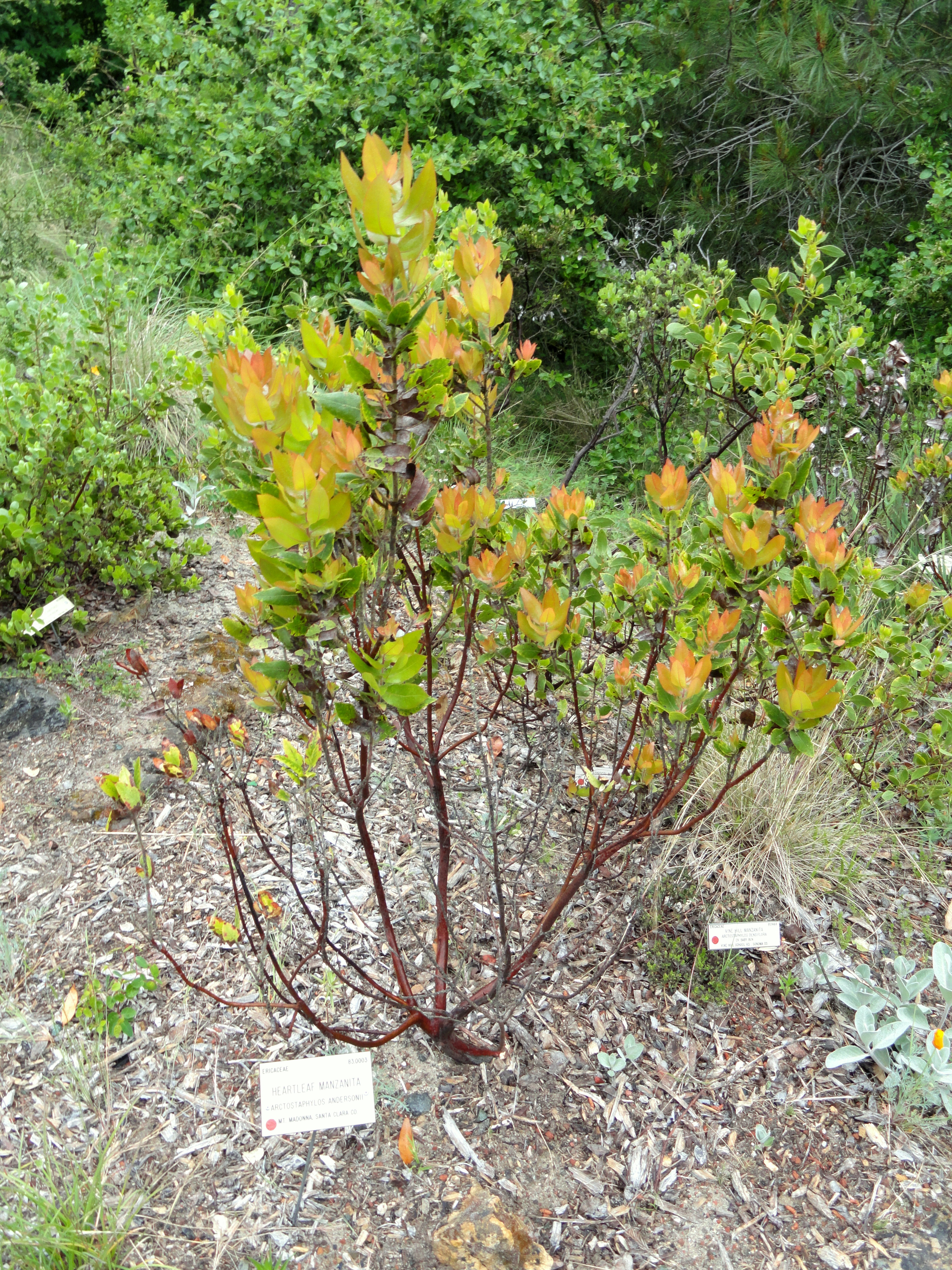

Conservation status
- Imperiled (NatureServe)

Scientific classification
- Kingdom: Plantae
- Clade: Tracheophytes
- Clade: Angiosperms
- Clade: Eudicots
- Clade: Asterids
- Order: Ericales
- Family: Ericaceae
- Genus: Arctostaphylos
- Species: A. andersonii

Binomial name
- Arctostaphylos andersonii A.Gray

= Arctostaphylos andersonii =

Species of flowering plant

Arctostaphylos andersonii, the Santa Cruz manzanita, is a species of Arctostaphylos.

== Description ==
Arctostaphylos andersonii is a woody shrub 2–5 m high, which can resemble a small tree. The 4–7 cm smooth leaf blades have serrated edges and deeply lobed bases. It flowers February through May. The fruit is small (2–8 mm) and sticky.

The Santa Cruz manzanita has no basal burl for regrowth and must propagate by seed.

Some populations closer to the Bonny Doon region are highly glaucous (the leaves produce a white, powdery substance on the surface) whereas others are not. The chromosome count is 2n=26.

This species is often confused with A. regismontana, A. pallida, and A. pajaroensis, but can be easily identified by geography.

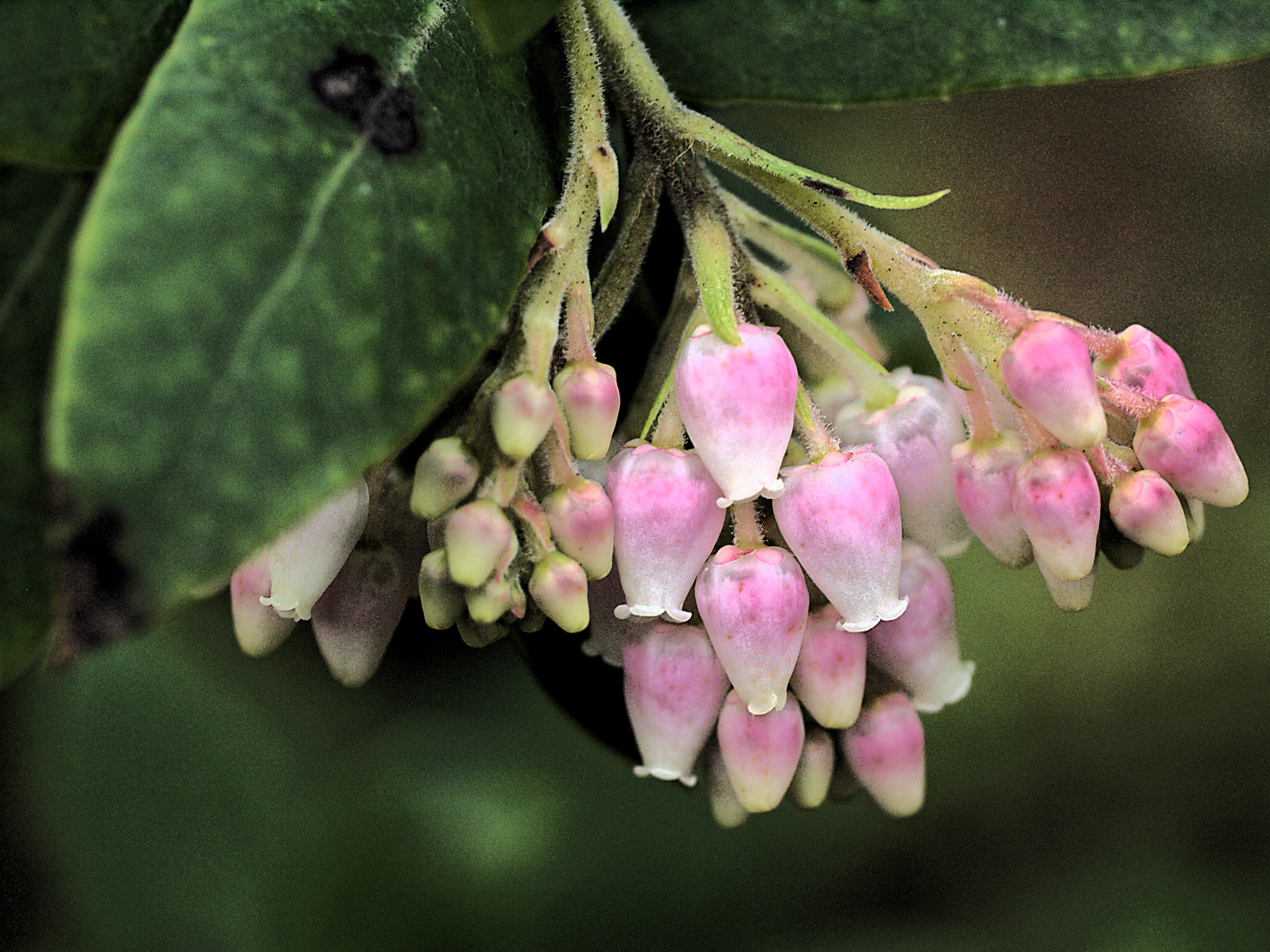
Flowers

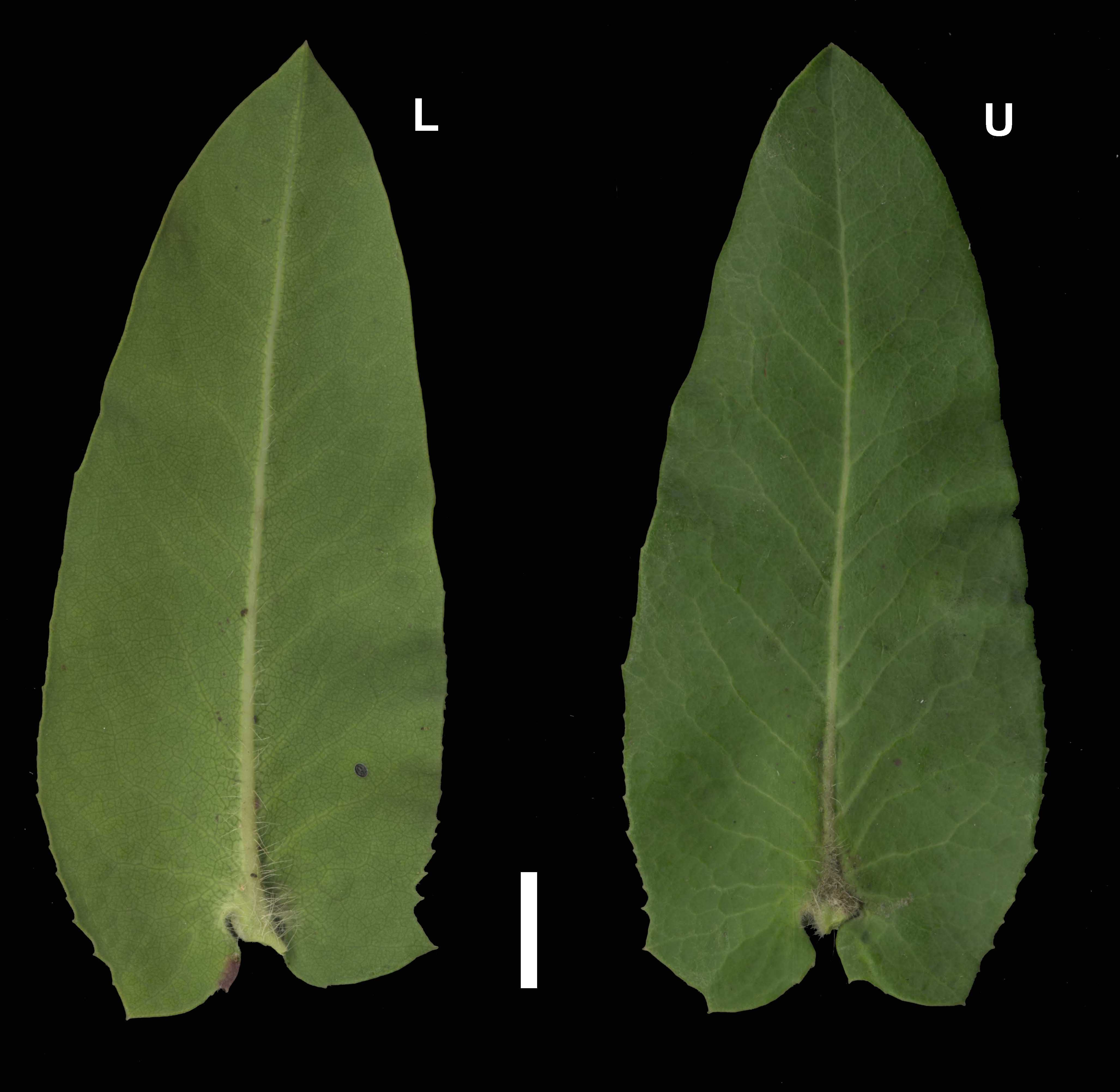
Leaves

== Distribution ==
This species is limited in geography to the Santa Cruz Mountains of California. It grows in openings in redwood forests, usually below 700 meters (2300 feet) elevation. It was named after Charles Lewis Anderson by Asa Gray.
