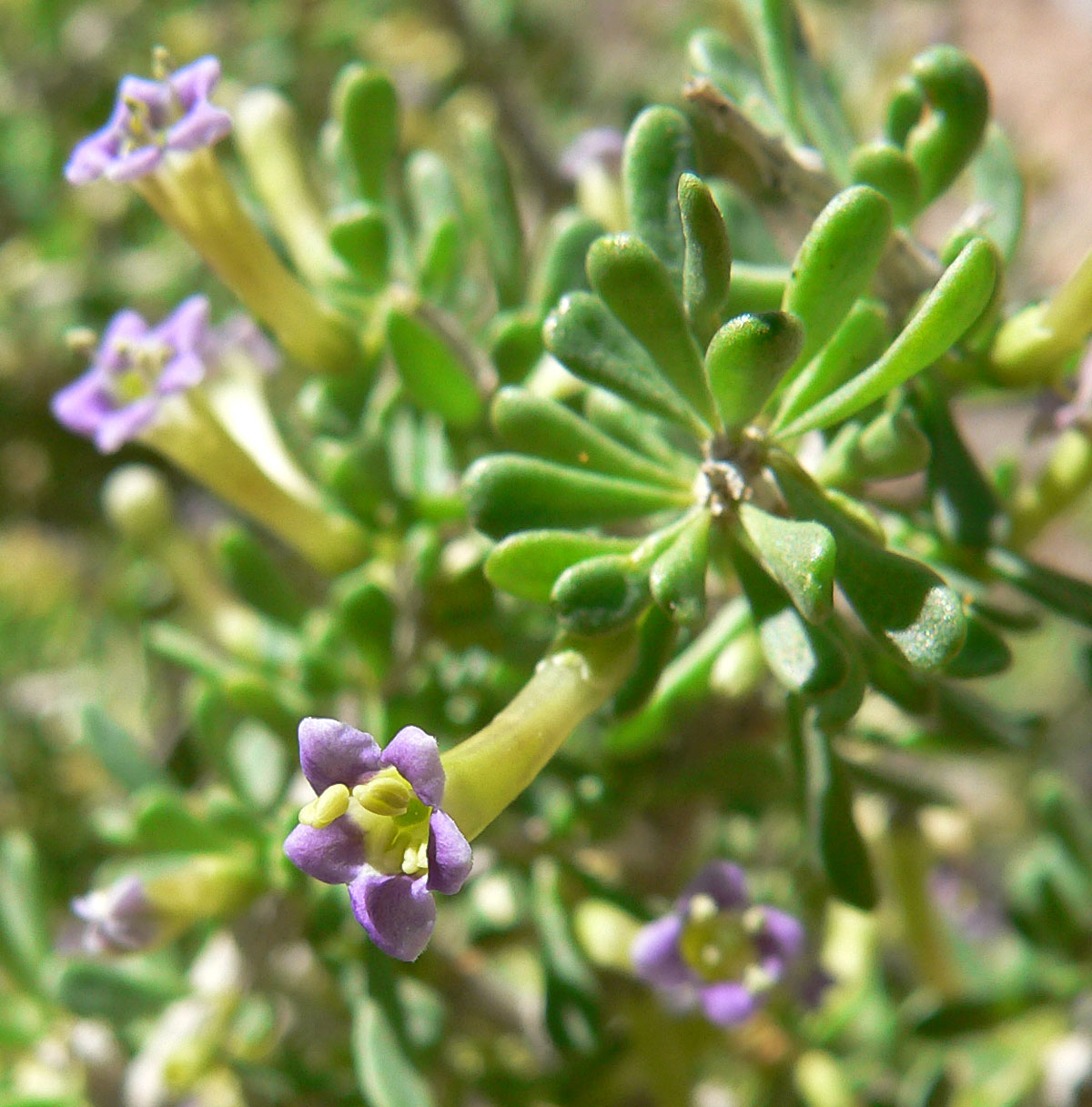

Conservation status
- Secure (NatureServe)

Scientific classification
- Kingdom: Plantae
- Clade: Tracheophytes
- Clade: Angiosperms
- Clade: Eudicots
- Clade: Asterids
- Order: Solanales
- Family: Solanaceae
- Genus: Lycium
- Species: L. andersonii

Binomial name
- Lycium andersonii A. Gray

= Lycium andersonii =

Species of flowering plant

Lycium andersonii is a species of flowering plant in the nightshade family, Solanaceae. Its common names include water-jacket, redberry desert-thorn, Anderson thornbush, Anderson's desert thorn, Anderson boxthorn, Anderson lycium, Anderson wolfberry, and squawberry.

The species is native to the Southwestern United States and northwestern Mexico, where it is distributed in New Mexico, Arizona, California, Nevada, Utah, Baja California, Sinaloa, and Sonora. It grows in many habitat types and plant communities, including pinyon-juniper woodland, creosote bush scrub, sagebrush scrub, chaparral, and coastal sage scrub.

This plant is a shrub growing up to about 2.7 metres (8 ft 10 in) in maximum height. It grows from a large fibrous root system which can extend over 9 metres (30 ft) from the base of the plant. The shrub is rounded in shape with many branches covered in many thin spines up to 2 centimetres (0.79 in) long. The flat leaves are thick and fleshy, measuring up to 1.7 centimetres (0.67 in) long. They are shed from the plant in dry conditions. The flowers have funnel-shaped white or purple-tinged corollas up to a centimeter long. The fruit is a red or orange berry less than a centimeter long.

This plant grows in sandy, gravelly washes and on slopes and mesas. It tolerates some soil salinity and alkaline soils such as caliche. It thrives in hot, dry climates. It is rarely dominant in the local flora. Common associates include creosote bush (Larrea tridentata), yellow palo verde (Parkinsonia microphylla), white bursage, (Ambrosia dumosa), smoke tree (Psorothamnus spinosus), Nevada ephedra (Ephedra nevadensis), hop sage (Grayia spinosa), pale wolfberry (Lycium pallidum), blackbrush (Coleogyne ramosissima), singlewhorl burrobrush (Hymenoclea monogyra), and Joshua tree (Yucca brevifolia).

It was named after Charles Lewis Anderson by Asa Gray.
