= Charles Lewis Anderson =

American physician (1827–1910)

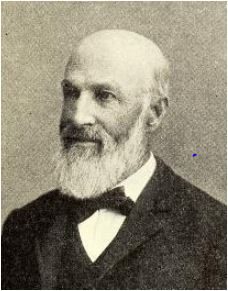
- Born: September 27, 1827; Roanoke County, Virginia, U.S.
- Died: December 22, 1910 (aged 83); Santa Cruz, California, U.S.
- Known for: Early Nevada and California botanist
- Spouse: Merial Howe Anderson
- Scientific career
- Fields: Botany and other areas of natural history

Charles Lewis Anderson (1827–1910) was an American medical doctor who, in addition to the practice of medicine, made important contributions to fields of natural history, especially botany. Educated in Indiana, he spent most of his professional life in the upper Midwest and West (Hennepin Co., Minnesota; Carson City, NV; and Santa Cruz, CA). Many plants collected by him were subsequently named in his honor. He wrote about local natural history, and actively engaged in public service in places where he resided.

== Biographical ==
He was born in Roanoke County, Virginia September 27, 1827. His family relocated to Morgan County, Indiana, when he was 10, and his further education took place in that state. He attended Franklin College and DePauw University (known, then, as Indiana Asbury University), and obtained his medical credentials from the latter in 1852. He then spent 10 years engaged in medical practice in Hennepin County, Minnesota. In 1862 he relocated to Carson City, Nevada (to be joined a year later by his wife and two daughters). He resided in Carson City for four years, then moved with his family to Santa Cruz, California, where he lived until his death in 1910.

During his college years he developed a strong interest in natural history, especially botany. His lifetime income was derived principally from medical practice, but he devoted much effort to the study of botany and other aspects of natural history.

=== Hennepin County, Minnesota ===
In 1852 he was one of the earliest physicians to set up medical practice in the region that later became Minneapolis. The St. Anthony and Minneapolis Union Medical Society was organized in 1855 with Dr. C. L. Anderson as vice-president. He was active in geological and geographical exploration to the west of the Minneapolis area, locating the Kandiyohi Lakes region, and going as far as the present states of Montana and Idaho. He was sometimes referred to as a geologist, and co-authored a report to the Minnesota state government suggesting a geological survey for the state, but the governor was reluctant to do so at that time.

He helped build a public school and served as the first school superintendent of Hennepin County.

Henry David Thoreau, in 1861 (the last year of his life), seeking a more healthful climate, visited the Minneapolis area for about two weeks. He wished to study the flora and fauna of the region, and was accompanied most of that time by Dr. Anderson, whom Thoreau had sought out when learning of his extensive knowledge of the area's natural history.

In March 1862, Anderson left Minnesota. As related by Shutter (p. 359): "He had many friends, and his departure was deeply regretted."

=== Carson City, Nevada ===
After settling his wife and two daughters in Beloit, Wisconsin, he commenced the arduous trek to Carson City. While travelling, and after arriving and establishing a practice there, he wrote frequently to his wife. In one letter he wrote:

The height of my ambition is to have a pleasant quiet cottage of 5 or 6 rooms, one for a library where we could read and converse evening or enjoy other amusements, a small garden of vines and fruits with a few choice flowers. A business that would yield a comfortable living and a few select friends to come and see us. Out of debt so that what I earned I could call my own, my motto then could be to "owe no man anything." In the study of Nature, and Nature's God, we would be enabled to live nearer to Him, and with greater happiness to ourselves."

His wife and daughters, braving the rigors of a wagon train journey, joined him in August 1863.

His four years in Nevada saw him travelling widely around Carson City, discovering and collecting many plant species new or only poorly known to science.

Public service included being superintendent of schools in Ormsby Co., and surgeon-general under Nevada's governor.

=== Santa Cruz, California ===
Dr. Anderson spent 10 years in Minneapolis, 4 years in Carson City, then 43 years, the rest of his life, in Santa Cruz. In each case he joined a community in its infancy, and was a significant contributor to its maturation.

In Santa Cruz he served local schools, and helped found the Santa Cruz City Public Library in 1868, serving as president of its first board of trustees. Subsequently, he oversaw the funding of a Carnegie library building. He was a "United States Examining surgeon for pensions", and served as "president of the City Board of Health"; he was also active in the Sons of Temperance, Chautauqua Literary and Scientific Circle, and Freemasonry.

==== Conservation ====
Anderson was an early proponent of wildlife conservation. He wrote that the "shooting of birds to get an exact measurement of the different parts of their bodies, the color, etc., is practiced too much and becomes a cruelty. A spyglass, close observation, and a ready ear would give all the information we need in most cases."(p. 144) He acknowledged his indebtedness to two ornithologists who provided him with information for his essay on Our Feathered Songsters, but commented parenthetically "I only wish they would not use their little guns so much."(p. 145) He also remarked negatively on catching trout in freshwater streams ("they are more beautiful there than in our fish basket"

Logging of coast redwoods was well underway in the later 1800s along the central and northern California coast. In his 1879 booklet Anderson wrote of his concerns:

REDWOOD FORESTS . . . Although the supply of timber is very great in the mountains it cannot be considered inexhaustible. The rapid increase of population and consequent demand for building material and fuel will in time lead to the denudation of the region nearest the large cities. Consequently a preservative policy should be adopted at an early date by which a portion of the land should retain, at least, the younger for future use. It would indeed be a wise policy to enforce a law to this effect if it cannot be done otherwise. The general future good of our State requires it . . .

==== Death ====
Extract from an obituary in the Santa Cruz Sentinel of December 23, 1910:

"Dr. C. L. Anderson, one of the most respected of Santa Cruz County's old pioneers, passed away at the advanced age of 83 years and 8 months . . . leaving his widow and their three children, all of this county . . . The cause of the death was paralysis, brought on by old age. . . . The doctor, who for many years enjoyed an enviable medical practice in this community, was a man of scholarly attainments . . . was a man of exemplary character, of an even disposltion, quiet in his ways, unpretending, self-sacrificing, of a very kindly nature. Santa Cruz was made much richer by his presence amongst us, for he lived a life of service, caring little for pecuniary emoluments.

== Collecting, and eponymous scientific names ==
=== Flowering plants ===
During the period 1862 - 1867, when Anderson lived in Nevada, he collected many specimens of flowering plants, which he sent to Asa Gray's herbarium for analysis. According to Tiehm, 34 of the plants collected in Nevada became type specimens (as did at least one, collected later, when he lived in Santa Cruz, CA; namely, Arctostaphylos andersonii A.Gray).

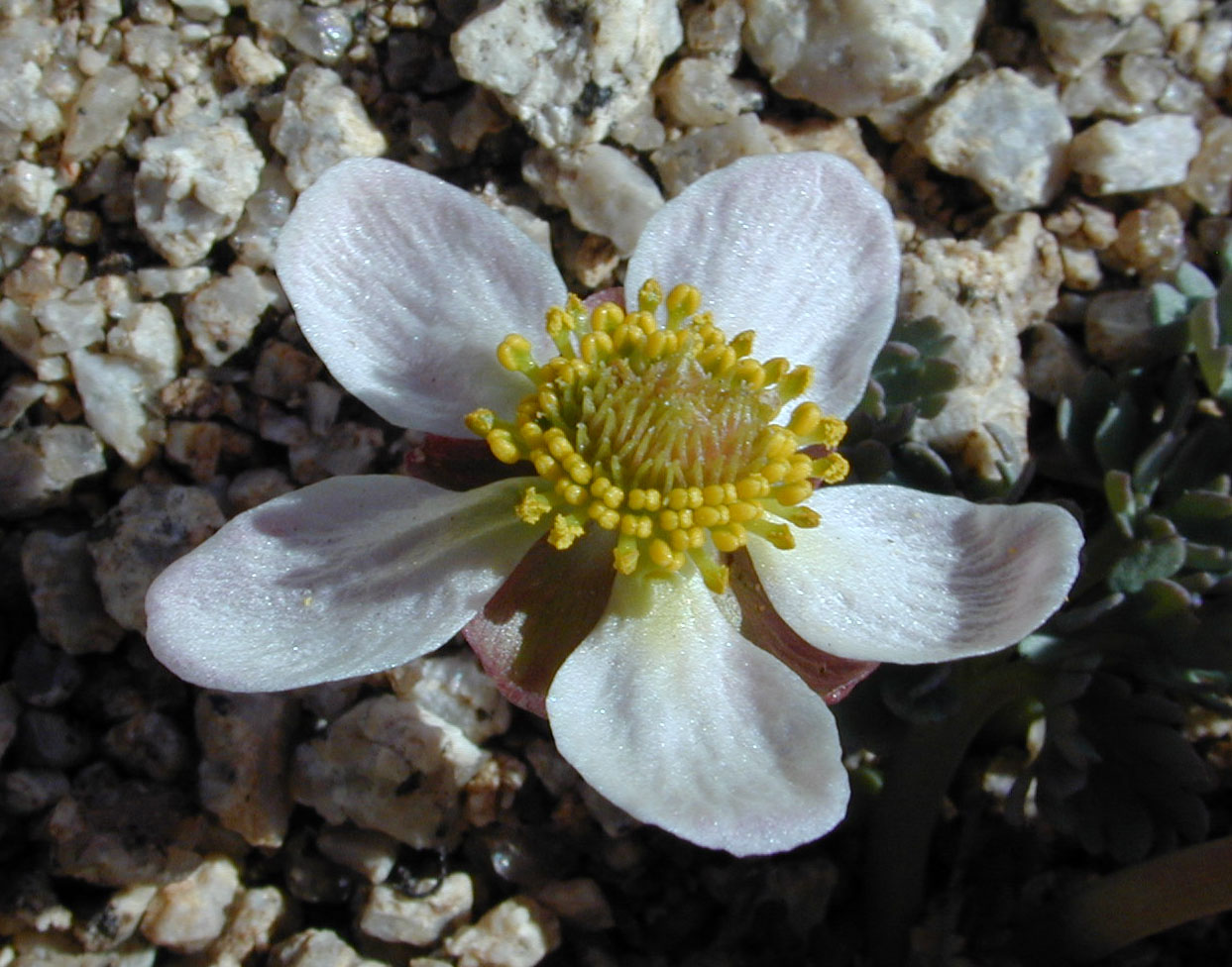
Ranunculus andersonii, Eastern Sierra Nevada

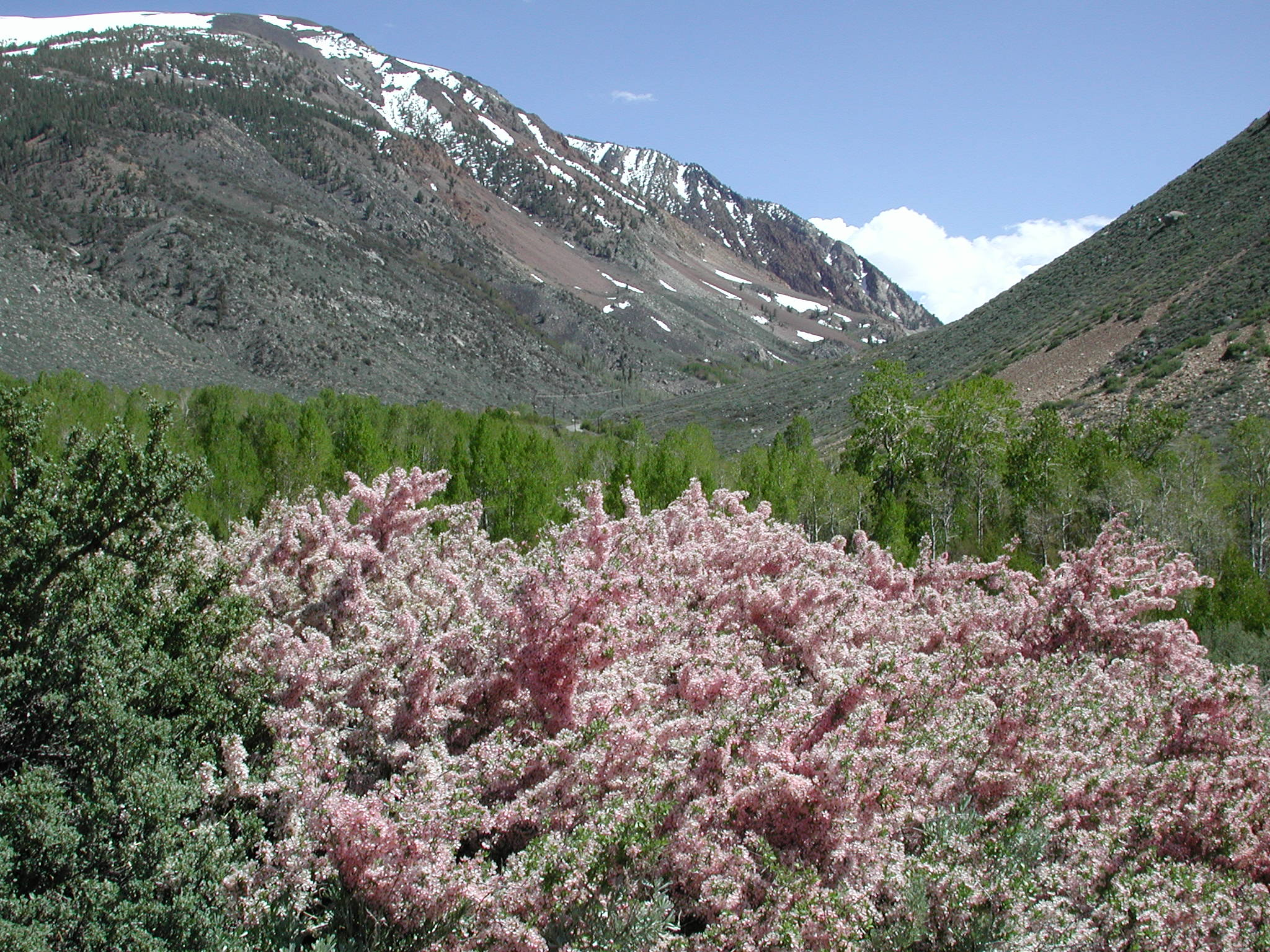
Prunus andersonii, Eastern Sierra Nevada

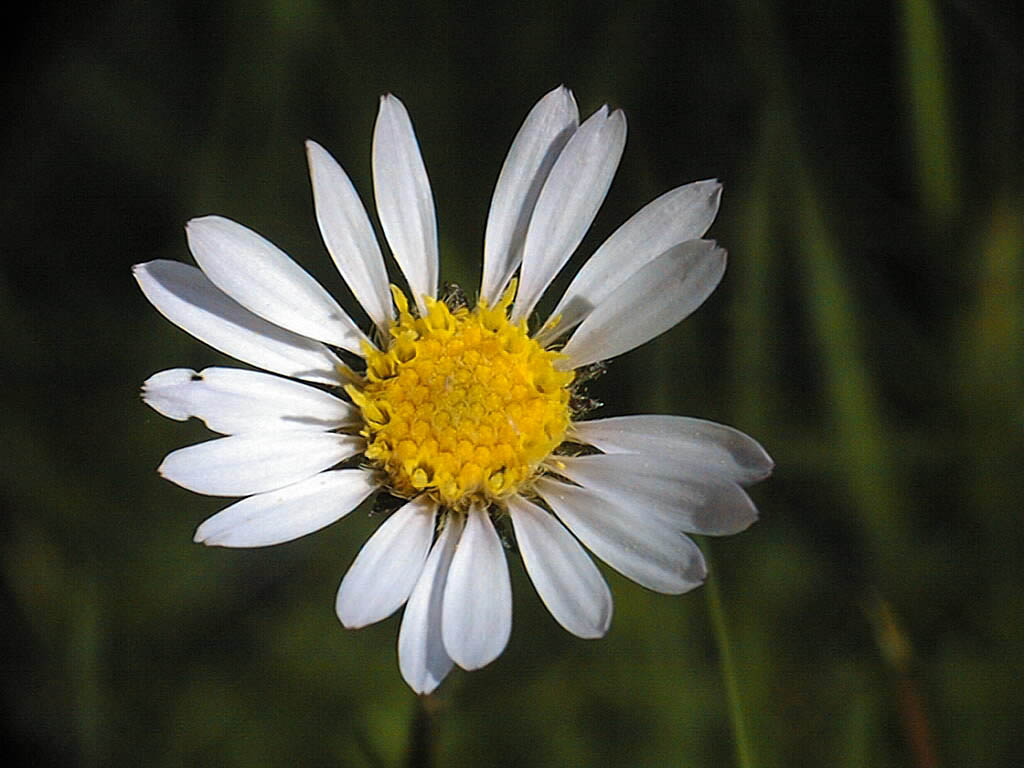
Oreostemma alpigenum var. andersonii, Eastern Sierra Nevada

Many binomial scientific names honor an Anderson; the ones below honor Charles Lewis Anderson, and are currently (2020) accepted (see references and ITIS). Each name is followed by the (plant family name), a common name, and the region where Anderson collected the type specimen.

Photographs of each flowering plant may be found at CalPhotos, and further information is available at CalFlora.

- Arctostaphylos andersonii A.Gray (Ericaceae), Santa Cruz manzanita, near Santa Cruz, CA
- Astragalus andersonii A.Gray (Fabaceae), Anderson's milkvetch, near Carson City, NV
- Cirsium andersonii (A. Gray) Petr (Asteraceae), Anderson's thistle, Sierra Nevada [Original name: Cnicus andersonii (A. Gray)]
- Delphinium andersonii A.Gray (Ranunculaceae), Anderson's larkspur, eastern Sierra Nevada
- Lupinus andersonii S.Watson (Fabaceae), Anderson's lupine, near Carson City, NV
- Lycium andersonii A.Gray (Solanaceae), Anderson thornbush, S.E. NV
- Oreostemma alpigenum var. andersonii (A. Gray) G.L. Nesom (Asteraceae), Anderson's aster, near Carson City, NV (Original name: Aster andersonii (A.Gray) A.Gray
- Prunus andersonii A.Gray (Rosaceae), desert peach, eastern Sierra Nevada
- Ranunculus andersonii A.Gray (Ranunculaceae), Anderson's buttercup, eastern Sierra Nevada
- Trifolium andersonii A.Gray (Fabaceae), Anderson's clover, near Carson City, NV

=== Marine algae ===
After settling in Santa Cruz, Anderson collected many specimens of marine algae. He sent them to W. G. Farlow, a prominent phycologist, who wrote of "the many interesting species discovered by Dr. Anderson", and named some in Anderson's honor. With W. G. Farlow and Daniel Cady Eaton he issued the exsiccata series Algae exsiccatae Americae Borealis (1877-1889).

The following is currently (2020) an accepted name:

- Haplogloia andersonii (Farlow) Levring (Chordariaceae), hairy brown seaweed, Santa Cruz, CA

== Publications ==
- Anderson, C. L. 1861. Report on Geology and Plan for a Geological Survey of the State of Minnesota. State of Minnesota. Retrieved from the University of Minnesota Digital Conservancy, http://hdl.handle.net/11299/59459
- Anderson, C. L. 1871. A Catalog of Nevada Flora. Third Biennial Report of the State Mineralogist. p. 116-128.
- Anderson, C. L. 1879. Santa Cruz for Homes: The Climate, Botany, Geology and Health of Santa Cruz and Vicinity. https://babel.hathitrust.org/cgi/pt?id=hvd.32044106424104&view=1up&seq=13
- Anderson, C. L.(Ed). 1890. Catalog of Flowering Plants and Ferns of Santa Cruz County, California. Santa Cruz Surf Print.
- Anderson, C. L. 1892. Chapter VI: Geology or the Ancient History of Santa Cruz, pp 90–97
- Anderson, C. L. 1892. Chapter VII: The Gardens of the Seashore, pp 98–110
- Anderson, C. L. 1892. Chapter VIII: The Fishes of Monterey Bay, pp 111–117
- Anderson, C. L. 1892. Chapter IX: Catalogue of Flowering Plants and Ferns of Santa Cruz County, California, pp 118–128
- Anderson, C. L. 1892. Chapter X: Lists and Notes of Native and other Grasses Found Growing Wild in Santa Cruz County, pp 129–135
- Anderson, C. L. 1892. Chapter XII: Our Feathered Songsters, pp 144–150
- Anderson, C. L. 1894. Some New and Some Old Algae but Recently Recognized on the California Coast . . . . Zoe 4(4):358
