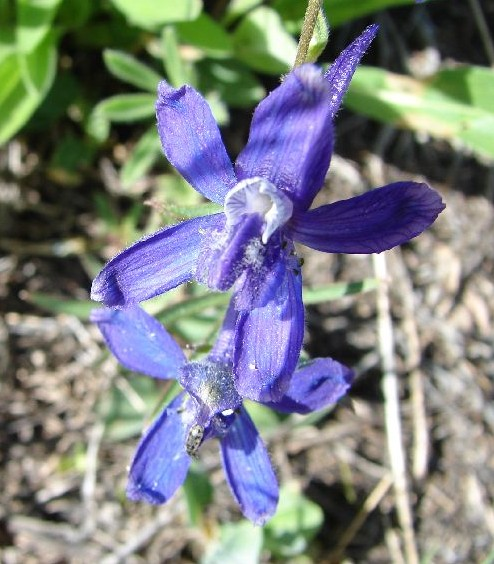

Scientific classification
- Kingdom: Plantae
- Clade: Tracheophytes
- Clade: Angiosperms
- Clade: Eudicots
- Order: Ranunculales
- Family: Ranunculaceae
- Genus: Delphinium
- Species: D. andersonii

Binomial name
- Delphinium andersonii A.Gray

Synonyms
- Delphinium cognatum Delphinium xylorrhizum

= Delphinium andersonii =

Species of flowering plant

Delphinium andersonii is a species of perennial larkspur known as Anderson's larkspur. This wildflower is native to western North America, where it can be found in the Great Basin and the Sierra Nevada.

D. andersonii is an erect perennial usually reaching about half a meter in height. It has small leaves on long petioles with the leaf blades divided into long fingerlike lobes. The top of the slender stem is occupied by a cylindrical inflorescence of flowers, each flower two to four centimeters wide with a spur measuring nearly two centimeters in length. The flowers usually have sepals of a brilliant dark blue, with the lower two petals the same color and the upper two petals white. Some individuals have sepals and petals of very light purple or blue to almost white. The anthers are often yellow. It was named after Charles Lewis Anderson by Asa Gray.
