= Lupinus andersonii =

Conservation status
- Secure (NatureServe)

Scientific classification
- Kingdom: Plantae
- Clade: Tracheophytes
- Clade: Angiosperms
- Clade: Eudicots
- Clade: Rosids
- Order: Fabales
- Family: Fabaceae
- Subfamily: Faboideae
- Genus: Lupinus
- Species: L. andersonii

Binomial name
- Lupinus andersonii S.Watson

Species of legume

Lupinus andersonii is a species of lupine known by the common name Anderson's lupine.

== Description ==
It is native to California and adjacent sections of Oregon and Nevada, where it grows in dry mountain habitat of various types. This lupine is similar to Lupinus albicaulis in appearance. It is a hairy, erect perennial herb growing 20 to 90 centimeters in height. Each palmate leaf is made up of 6 to 9 leaflets each up to 6 centimeters long. The inflorescence is up to 23 centimeters long, bearing whorls of flowers each roughly a centimeter long. The flower is purple to yellowish or whitish in color. The fruit is a silky-hairy legume pod up to 4.5 centimeters long containing several seeds. It was named after Charles Lewis Anderson by Sereno Watson. The bloom period is the months of June, July, August, and September. The habitat for this species includes slopes and ridges. Its communities include, the Yellow Pine Forest, the Red Fir Forest, and the Lodgepole Forest communities. The common elevation for this species is between 1475 and 9580 feet or 450 to 2920 meters. The growing season for this plant is six or less months. The host for this plant include, the Arrowhead Blue butterfly, bees, and hummingbirds. The Sagebrush Sooty Hairstreak is also a host for this species. The flower colors include, blue, lavender, and purple.
