= Cercocarpus douglasii =

Klamath mountain mahogany

Scientific classification
- Kingdom: Plantae
- Clade: Tracheophytes
- Clade: Angiosperms
- Clade: Eudicots
- Clade: Rosids
- Order: Rosales
- Family: Rosaceae
- Genus: Cercocarpus
- Species: C. douglasii

Binomial name
- Cercocarpus douglasii Rydb. 1913

Species of flowering plant

Cercocarpus douglasii, common name Klamath mountain mahogany, is a plant species native to northern California and southwestern Oregon.

Cercocarpus douglasii is a tree up to 5 meters (17 feet) tall with rough, gray bark. Leaves are oblong to oblanceolate, up to 5 cm (2 inches) long, with rounded tips, green and hairless on the upper side but whitish with woolly hairs underneath. Flowers are borne in groups of 2 or 3 in the axils of the leaves.
