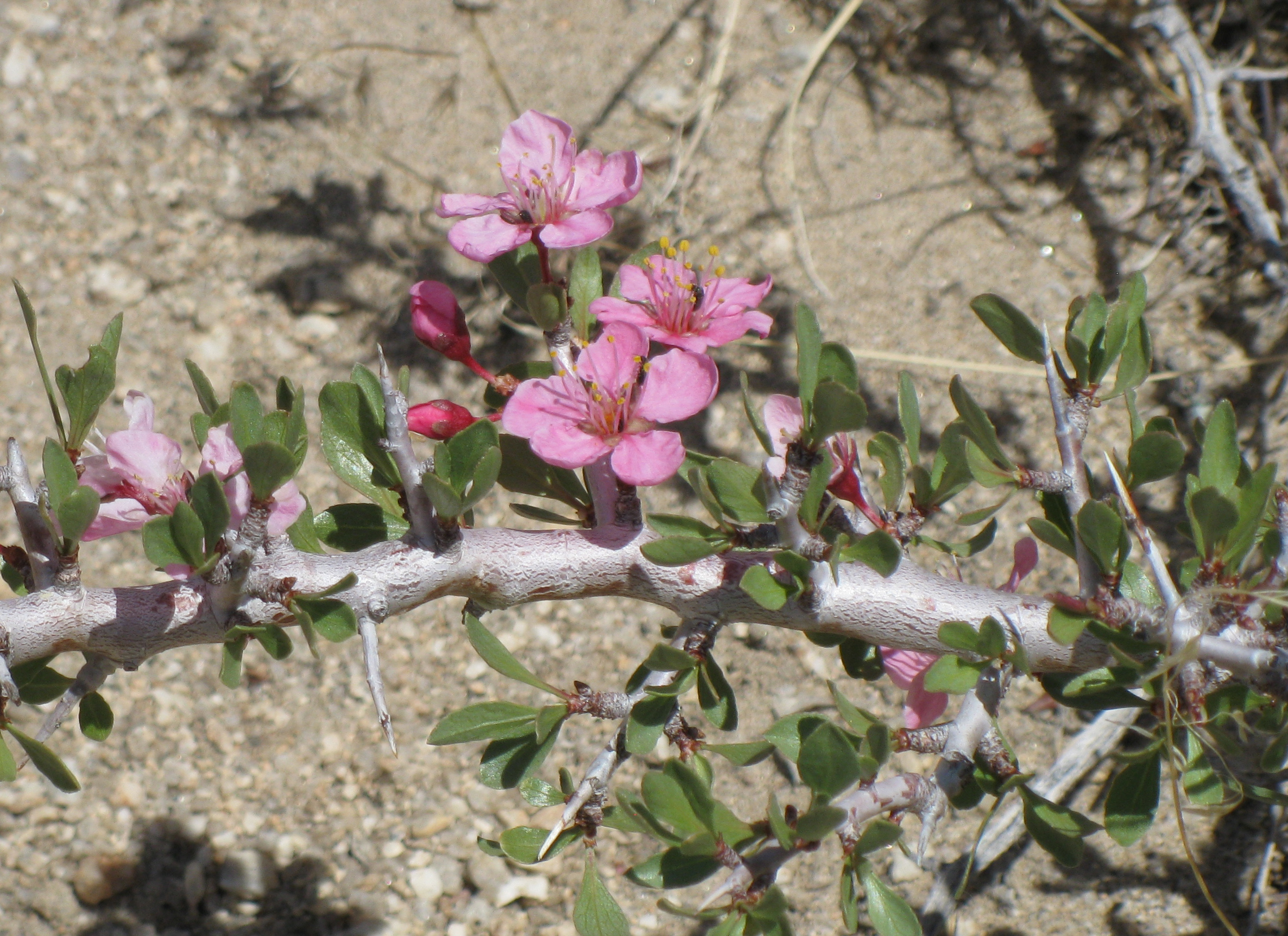

Conservation status
- Least Concern (IUCN 3.1)

Scientific classification
- Kingdom: Plantae
- Clade: Embryophytes
- Clade: Tracheophytes
- Clade: Angiosperms
- Clade: Eudicots
- Clade: Rosids
- Order: Rosales
- Family: Rosaceae
- Genus: Prunus
- Species: P. andersonii

Binomial name
- Prunus andersonii A.Gray

Synonyms
- Amygdalus andersonii (A. Gray) Greene; Amygdalus andersonii (A. Gray) W. Wight; Emplectocladus andersonii (A. Gray) A. Nelson & P.B. Kenn.

= Prunus andersonii =

Species of shrub

Prunus andersonii is a North American species of shrub in the same genus as the peach, cherry, and almond. Its common names include desert peach and desert almond.

== Description ==
Prunus andersonii is a deciduous shrub or tree up to 3 metres (10 feet) in height, its tangling branches narrowing to spiny-tipped twigs. Serrated, lance-shaped to oval leaves occur in alternate bundles, each leaf measuring up to 3 centimeters (1 in) long. The inflorescence is a solitary flower or cluster of up to five flowers. Each flower has usually five concave pink petals up to 1 cm (3/8 in) long, with many whiskerlike stamens at the center. The flowers bloom before or at the same time as the leaves appear.

The fruit is a fuzzy reddish-orange drupe around 1 cm (3/8 in) wide. The fruits are fleshy in years with ample moisture and dry in drought years. The seed is a heart-shaped stone. The plant reproduces sexually via germination of the seed and vegetatively by sprouting from its rhizome. One plant may sprout and resprout from its rhizomes to form a very large clone which can spread over several acres.

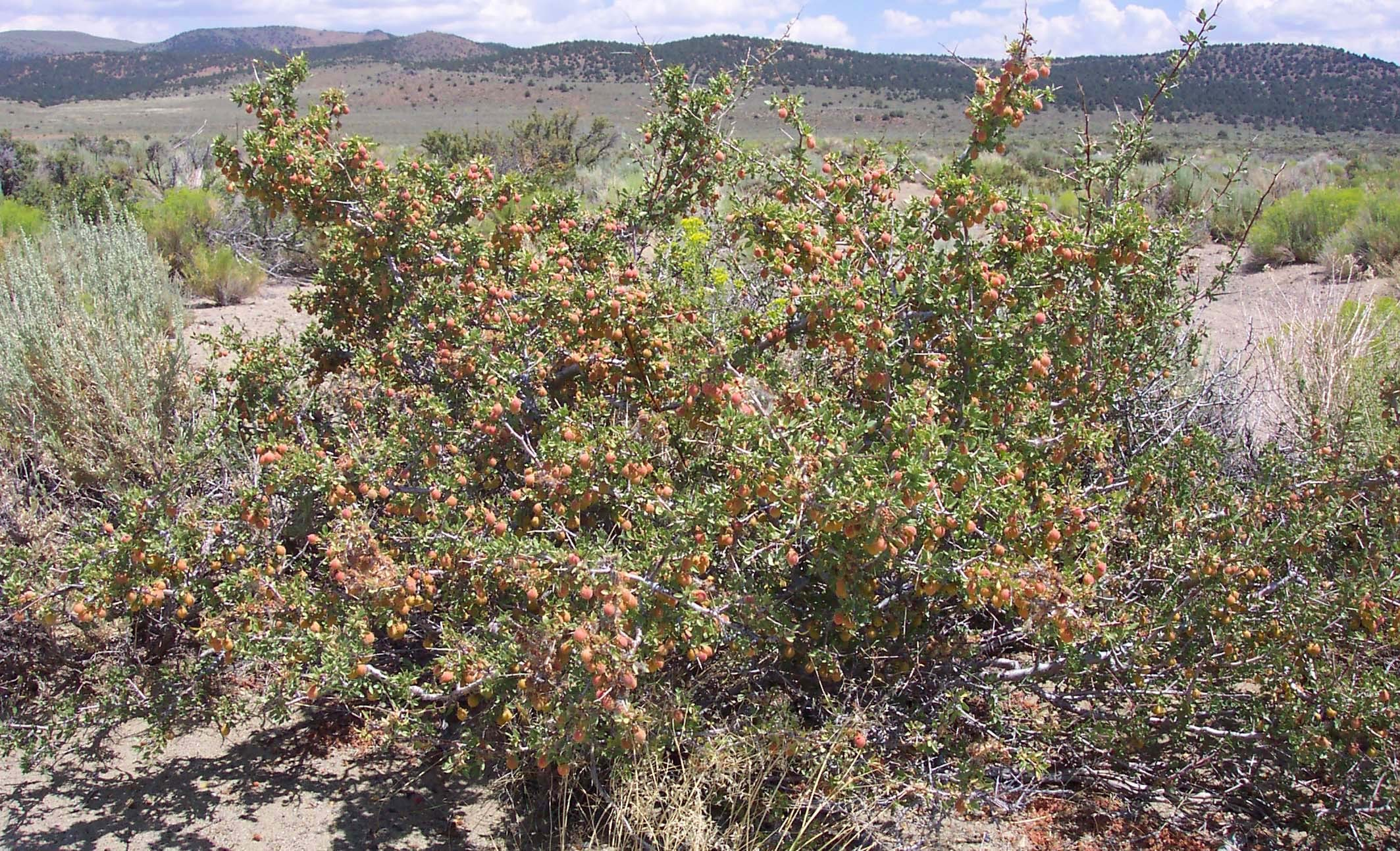
Habit

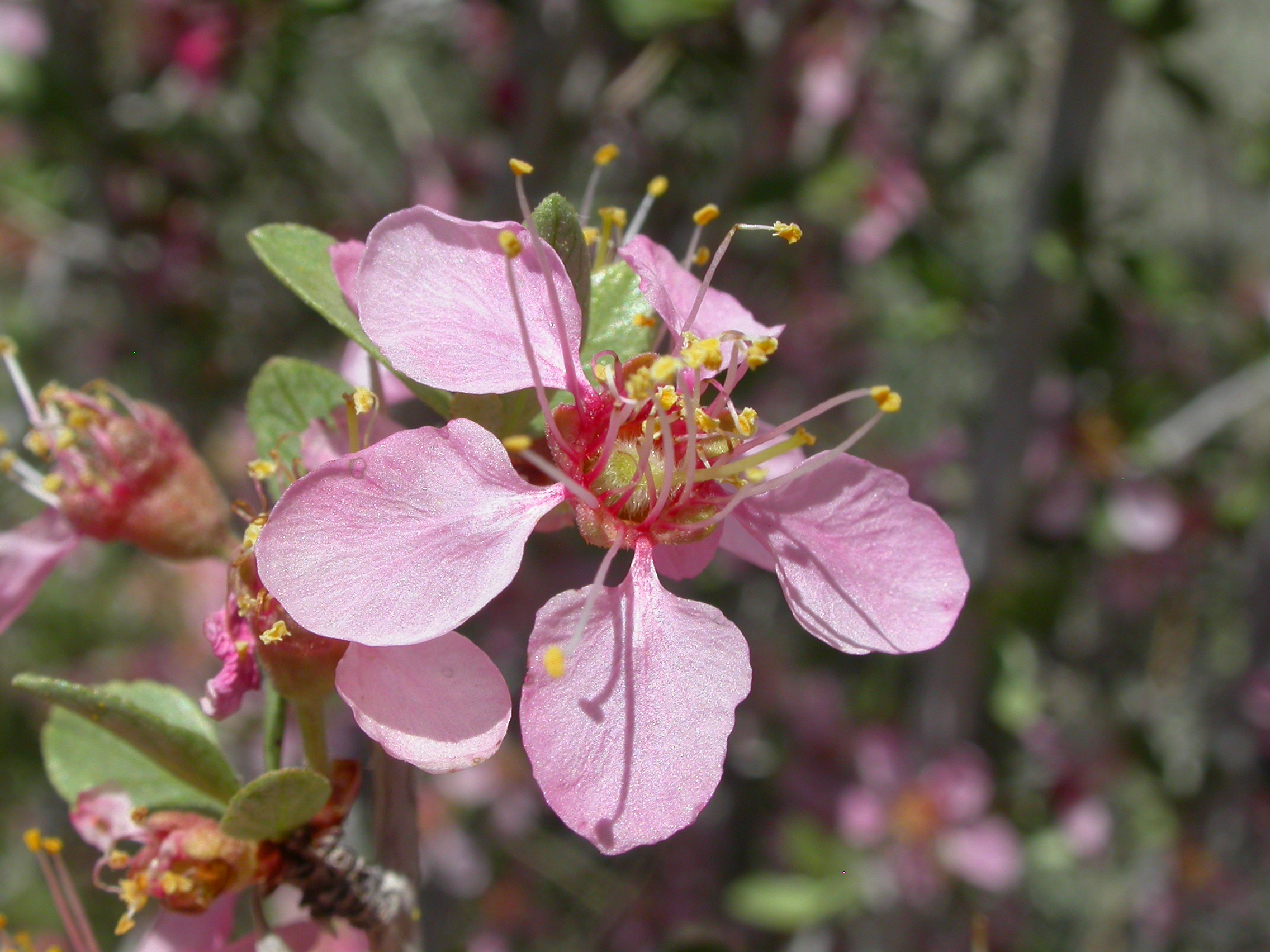
Flower close-up

== Taxonomy ==
It was named after Charles Lewis Anderson by Asa Gray.

== Distribution and habitat ==
It is native to eastern California and western Nevada, where it grows in forests and scrub in desert and mountains.

== Ecology ==
Many animals collect and eat the fruits and cache the seeds.

== Uses ==
The fruit is reportedly edible. Among Native American groups, the Paiute used the plant for making tea and medicinal remedies, and the Cahuilla considered the fruit a delicacy.
