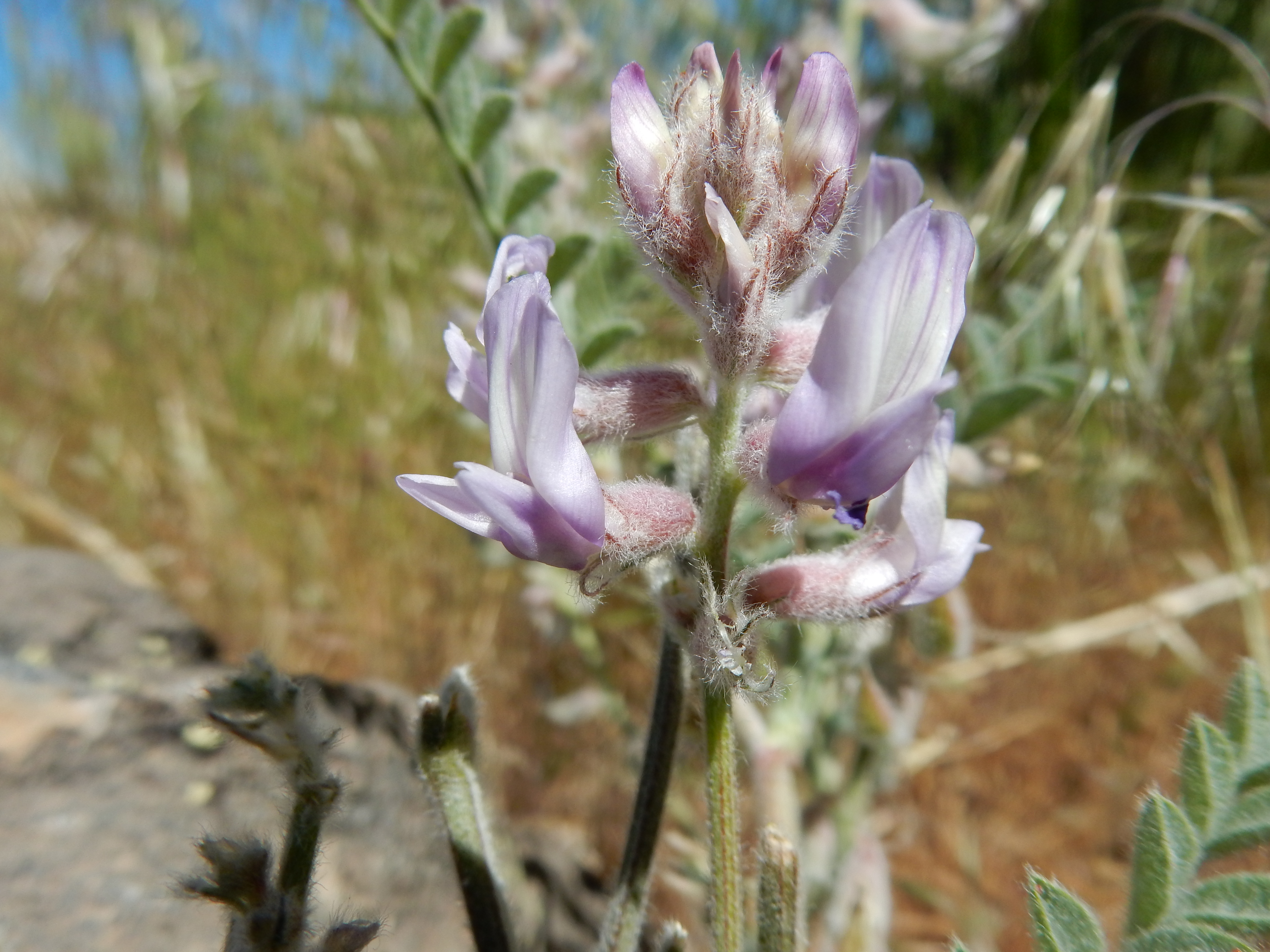

Conservation status
- Apparently Secure (NatureServe)

Scientific classification
- Kingdom: Plantae
- Clade: Embryophytes
- Clade: Tracheophytes
- Clade: Spermatophytes
- Clade: Angiosperms
- Clade: Eudicots
- Clade: Rosids
- Order: Fabales
- Family: Fabaceae
- Subfamily: Faboideae
- Genus: Astragalus
- Species: A. andersonii

Binomial name
- Astragalus andersonii A.Gray

Synonyms
- Hamosa andersonii; Tragacantha andersonii

= Astragalus andersonii =

Plant species in the family

Astragalus andersonii is a species of milkvetch known by the common name Anderson's milkvetch. It is native to eastern California and western Nevada, where it is found in the plateaus at the foot of the Sierra Nevada, including the Modoc Plateau. It was named after Charles Lewis Anderson by Asa Gray.

== Description ==
This is a small perennial herb forming a thick patch on the ground, the stems reaching about 20 centimeters in maximum length. The plant is coated in dense gray to white wavy hairs. The leaves are up to 10 centimeters long and made up of several oval-shaped leaflets. The inflorescence is a projecting or upright array of 12 to 26 pealike flowers. Each flower is white, often purple-tinted or purple-veined, and between 1 and 2 centimeters long. The fruit is a curved legume pod 1 to 2 centimeters long.

It is coated in very long white hairs and dries to a thick papery texture, the beans inside rattling with the wind.

== Taxonomy ==
Astragalus andersonii was scientifically described and named by Asa Gray in 1865. It is classified in the genus Astragalus within the Fabaceae family. It has two homotypic synonyms, Tragacantha andersonii from an 1891 reclassification by Otto Kuntze and Hamosa andersonii from 1927, published by Per Axel Rydberg.

== Range ==
Astragalus andersonii is native to eastern California and western Nevada. In California it is confined to Mono and Inyo counties in the south and Sierra, Plumas, and Lassen counties in the north. In Nevada it grows in five counties in the northwest, Washoe, Storey, Carson City, Douglas, and Lyon.
