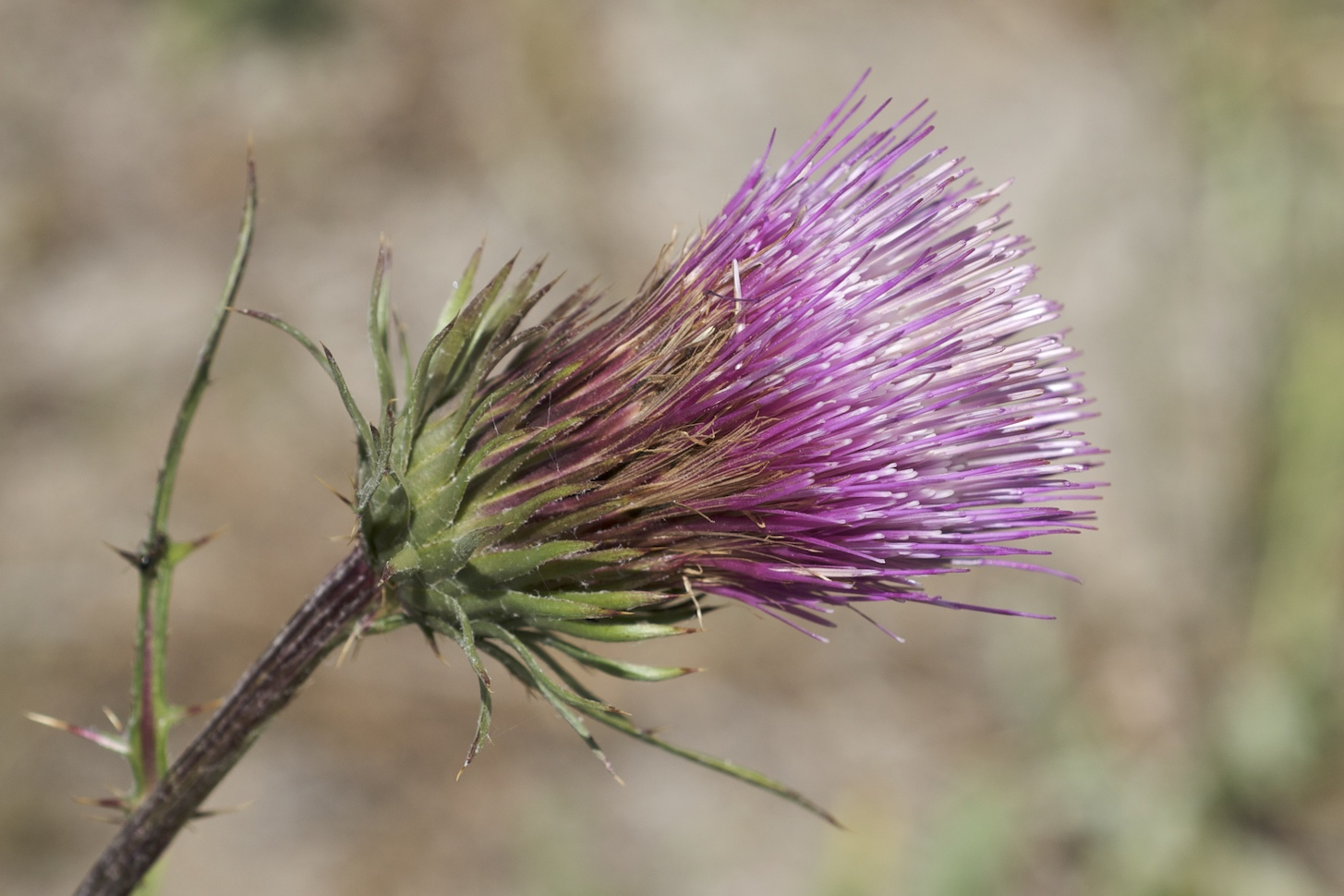

Scientific classification
- Kingdom: Plantae
- Clade: Tracheophytes
- Clade: Angiosperms
- Clade: Eudicots
- Clade: Asterids
- Order: Asterales
- Family: Asteraceae
- Genus: Cirsium
- Species: C. andersonii

Binomial name
- Cirsium andersonii (A.Gray) Petr.

Synonyms
- Carduus andersonii (A.Gray) Greene; Cnicus andersonii A.Gray

= Cirsium andersonii =

Species of thistle

Cirsium andersonii is a North American species of thistle known by the common names Anderson's thistle and rose thistle. It is native to California, Oregon, and Nevada, where it grows in the woodlands and forest openings of the local high mountain ranges, including the Sierra Nevada and the southern Cascade Range. It has also been reported from Idaho.

This native thistle is a perennial herb growing erect to a maximum height approaching 100 cm (39 in). It produces one to multiple stems, simple or branching, which may be hairless to quite woolly. The deeply lobed and sharply cut leaves are borne on spiny-winged petioles, the longest toward the base of the plant reaching over 30 centimetres (12 inches) long. The inflorescence bears one or more flower heads, each up to 5 centimeters long by 4 wide at the largest. The head is lined with spiny, purple-tipped phyllaries which curve outward. The head contains many red, purplish, or rose pink flowers, each up to 4.5 centimeters long. The fruit is an achene with a brown body 6 or 7 millimeters long topped with a pappus which may be 4 centimeters in length. The flower heads attract hummingbirds.

It was originally named Cnicus andersonii after Charles Lewis Anderson by Asa Gray; its name was later changed to Cirsium andersonii by Petrak.
