= Gundlachia (plant) =

Scientific classification
- Kingdom: Plantae
- Clade: Tracheophytes
- Clade: Angiosperms
- Clade: Eudicots
- Clade: Asterids
- Order: Asterales
- Family: Asteraceae
- Subfamily: Asteroideae
- Tribe: Astereae
- Subtribe: Gutiereziinae
- Genus: Gundlachia; A.Gray

Synonyms
- Xylothamia G.L.Nesom, Y.B.Suh, D.R.Morgan & B.B.Simpson

Genus of flowering plants

Gundlachia, commonly called goldenshrub, is a genus of flowering plants in the family Asteraceae.

== Taxonomy ==
The genus Xylothamia was first described in 1990 with nine species. Molecular phylogenetic studies subsequently showed that these fell into two clades. Four species, including the type species of Xylothamia, were most closely related to the then Caribbean genus Gundlachia, and were transferred to that genus by Lowell E. Urbatsch and Roland P. Roberts in 2004. One of these species, Gundlachia riskindii, was later transferred to the genus Aquilula. As of May 2024, Plants of the World Online accepted these transfers, treating Xylothamia as a synonym of Gundlachia.

=== Species ===
As of May 2024, Plants of the World Online accepted five species:

- Gundlachia corymbosa (Urb.) Britton ex Bold. (including Gundlachia apiculata, Gundlachia foliosa and Gundlachia cubana) – Caribbean to Venezuela
- Gundlachia diffusa (Benth.) Urbatsch & R.P.Roberts – northwest Mexico
- Gundlachia domingensis (Spreng.) A.Gray (syns Gundlachia floribunda, Gundlachia lindeniana) – Cuba, Hispaniola
- Gundlachia triantha (S.F.Blake) Urbatsch & R.P.Roberts – southwest Texas to northeast Mexico
- Gundlachia truncata (G.L.Nesom) Urbatsch & R.P.Roberts – Mexico (Coahuila)
