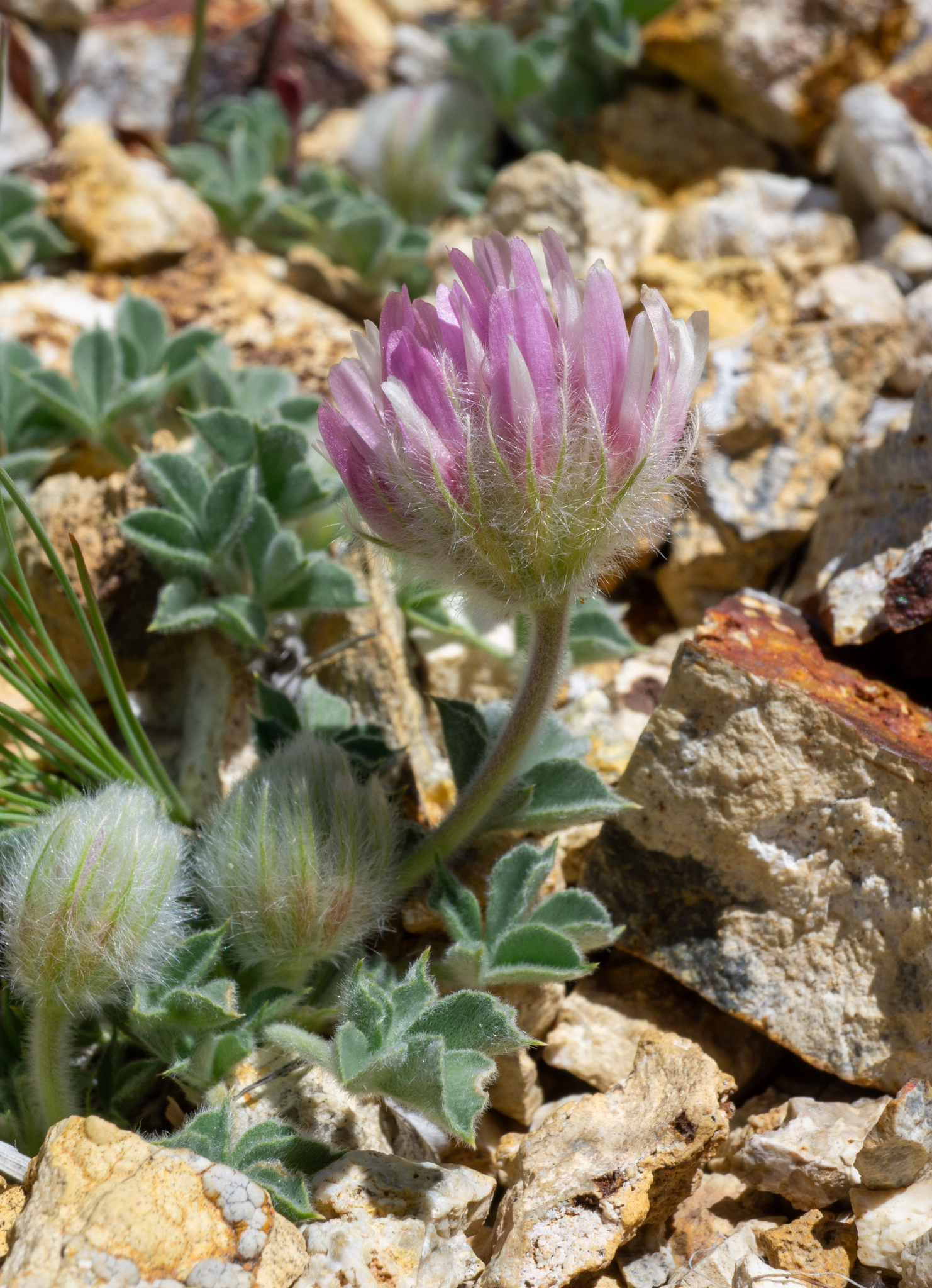
- Trifolium andersonii photographed in Washoe County, Nevada

Conservation status
- Secure (NatureServe)

Scientific classification
- Kingdom: Plantae
- Clade: Embryophytes
- Clade: Tracheophytes
- Clade: Angiosperms
- Clade: Eudicots
- Clade: Rosids
- Order: Fabales
- Family: Fabaceae
- Subfamily: Faboideae
- Genus: Trifolium
- Species: T. andersonii

Binomial name
- Trifolium andersonii A.Gray

Subspecies
- Trifolium andersonii subsp. andersonii; Trifolium andersonii subsp. beatleyae J.M.Gillett; Trifolium andersonii subsp. monoense (Greene) J.M.Gillett

Synonyms
- Species: Lupinaster andersonii (A.Gray) Latsch.; Trifolium andersonii var. andersonii; subsp. beatleyae: Trifolium andersonii var. beatleyae (J.M.Gillett) Isely; subsp. monoense: Trifolium monoense Greene; Trifolium andersonii var. monoense (Greene) Isely; Trifolium andersonii f. monoense (Greene) McDermott; Lupinaster monoensis (Greene) Latsch.

= Trifolium andersonii =

Species of flowering plant in the bean family

Trifolium andersonii is a species of clover known by the common names fiveleaf clover and Anderson's clover. It is native to the western United States, particularly the Great Basin and adjacent high mountain ranges, including the Sierra Nevada.

== Description ==
Trifolium andersonii is a perennial herb growing in a tuft or low cushion, and lacking a stem. The long-haired or woolly, silvery-gray leaves have 3 to 7 leaflets each up to 2 centimeters (3/4 in) long. The inflorescence is a head of flowers measuring 1.5 to 2.5 cm (1/2 to 1 in) wide. Each flower has a group of sepals (a calyx) with narrow, densely hairy lobes. Within the calyx is the flower corolla, which is pinkish purple or bicolored.

== Taxonomy ==
The species was named after Charles Lewis Anderson by Asa Gray.

Various subtaxa are usually recognized by authors as varieties or subspecies.

== Distribution and habitat ==
It grows in forests, mountain meadows, and talus. It has been noted to be the dominant species in dry areas on the alpine grassland steppe in the White Mountains of California.
