= Cercocarpus fothergilloides =

Conservation status
- Least Concern (IUCN 3.1)

Scientific classification
- Kingdom: Plantae
- Clade: Tracheophytes
- Clade: Angiosperms
- Clade: Eudicots
- Clade: Rosids
- Order: Rosales
- Family: Rosaceae
- Genus: Cercocarpus
- Species: C. fothergilloides

Binomial name
- Cercocarpus fothergilloides Kunth 1824 not Torr. 1828

Synonyms
- Cercocarpus mojadensis C.K.Schneid.

Species of flowering plant

Cercocarpus fothergilloides is a Mexican plant species in the rose family. It is widely distributed in northern and eastern Mexico, from Tamaulipas and Coahuila south as far as Oaxaca.

== Description ==
Cercocarpus fothergilloides is a shrub or small tree sometimes reaching 5 meters (17 feet) in height but usually much shorter. Leaves are egg-shaped, thick and leathery, with a thick coat of hairs on the underside but nearly hairless on the upper side. Flowers are borne in groups of 5–10.

== Range and habitat ==
Cercocarpus fothergilloides is widely distributed in the states of Chihuahua, Coahuila, Nuevo León, Tamaulipas, San Luis Potosí, Querétaro, and Hidalgo, where it is found in the Sierra Madre Oriental and ranges on the Mexican Plateau. Its estimated extent of occurrence (EOO) is large, at 220,293.371 km^{2}. Its estimated area of occupancy (AOO) is 304 km^{2}, but is likely much larger.

It is found in montane dry shrubland (matorral or chaparral) and montane oak forest and woodland, from 1,400 to 2,600 meters (4,590 to 8,530 ft) elevation.

== Conservation ==
The species is subject to habitat loss from logging, livestock grazing, human-caused fires, and other human activity across much of its range. It is also found in areas of well-conserved habitat. It not currently considered threatened, and its conservation status is assessed as least concern.
