= Solidago rupestris =

Scientific classification
- Kingdom: Plantae
- Clade: Tracheophytes
- Clade: Angiosperms
- Clade: Eudicots
- Clade: Asterids
- Order: Asterales
- Family: Asteraceae
- Genus: Solidago
- Species: S. rupestris

Binomial name
- Solidago rupestris Raf.

Synonyms
- Aster rupestris (Raf.) Kuntze; Solidago canadensis var. rupestris (Raf.) Porter

Species of flowering plant

Solidago rupestris , the rock goldenrod or riverbank goldenrod, is a North American species of flowering plants in the family Asteraceae. It is found in the eastern United States, found today in the States of Maryland, Virginia, Kentucky, and Tennessee. There are historical records of it formerly growing in Indiana and Pennsylvania as well, but these populations now appear to have been extirpated.

Solidago rupestris is a perennial herb up to 150 cm (5 feet) tall, spreading by means of underground rhizomes. Leaves are up to 12 cm (4.8 inches) long, on the stem of the plant rather than clustered around the base. One plant can produce as many as 900 small yellow flower heads in a showy, branching array. The species grows primarily on the banks of rivers.
