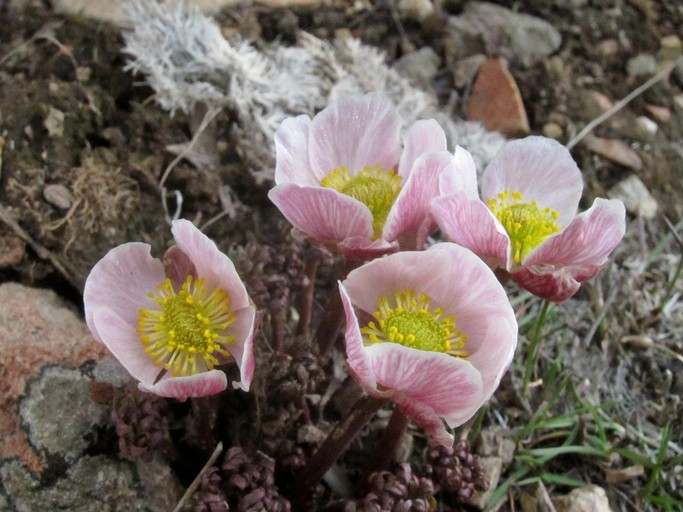

Conservation status
- Apparently Secure (NatureServe)

Scientific classification
- Kingdom: Plantae
- Clade: Tracheophytes
- Clade: Angiosperms
- Clade: Eudicots
- Order: Ranunculales
- Family: Ranunculaceae
- Genus: Ranunculus
- Species: R. andersonii

Binomial name
- Ranunculus andersonii A.Gray

= Ranunculus andersonii =

Species of buttercup

Ranunculus andersonii is a species of buttercup known by the common name Anderson's buttercup. It is native to the western United States, including the Great Basin and surrounding regions, where it grows in sagebrush, woodlands, and other habitat. It is a perennial herb producing a basal rosette of thick leaves which are each divided into three double-lobed leaflets at the end of a petiole. The inflorescence arises from the rosette on an erect, leafless stalk usually no more than 20 centimeters tall. It bears one flower with usually five white or red-tinged petals each up to 2 centimeters long with white or pinkish sepals at the base. At the center of the flower are many yellow stamens and pistils. The fruit is an achene, borne in a spherical cluster of 14 or more. It was named after Charles Lewis Anderson by Asa Gray.
