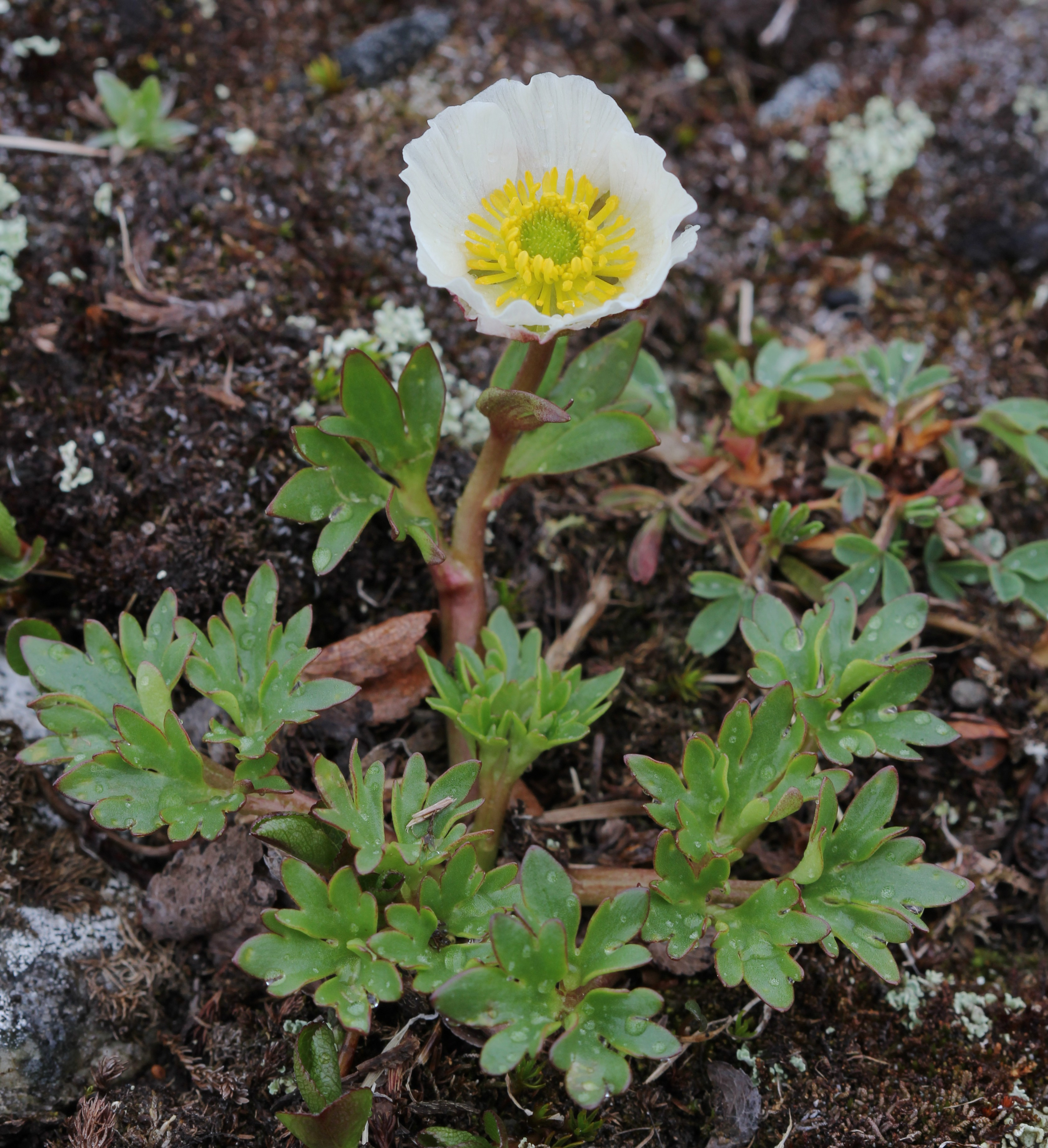

Scientific classification
- Kingdom: Plantae
- Clade: Tracheophytes
- Clade: Angiosperms
- Clade: Eudicots
- Order: Ranunculales
- Family: Ranunculaceae
- Genus: Ranunculus
- Species: R. glacialis

Binomial name
- Ranunculus glacialis L.

Synonyms
- Beckwithia glacialis (L.) Löve & Löve; Oxygraphis glacialis Regel

= Ranunculus glacialis =

Species of buttercup

Ranunculus glacialis, the glacier buttercup or glacier crowfoot, is a plant of the family Ranunculaceae. It is a 5-10(-20) cm high perennial herb. Often with a single relatively large (1.8 - 3.8 cm) flower, with 5 petals first white later pink or reddish. The underside of the 5 sepals are densely brown-hairy. The leaves are fleshy, shiny, and deeply lobed, forming 3 leaflets. Ranunculus glacialis is reported (from Greenland material) to have a diploid chromosome number of 2n = 16.

== Distribution and habitat ==
Ranunculus glacialis is an Arctic–alpine species, found in the high mountains of southern Europe (Alps, Pyrenees, Carpathians, Sierra Nevada) as well as on the Scandinavian peninsula, Iceland, the Faroe Islands, Jan Mayen, Svalbard, eastern Greenland and Finland, where it is endangered and protected.

It has been described as being one of the highest-ascending plants in the Alps, flowering at over 4,000 m.

It is found in fell-field and snow-bed sites, on edges of meltwater streams.

== Subspecies ==
Several subspecies are described.

One subspecies, Ranunculus glacialis subsp. chamissonis, is found on either side of the Bering Strait in Siberia, Russia and Alaska.
