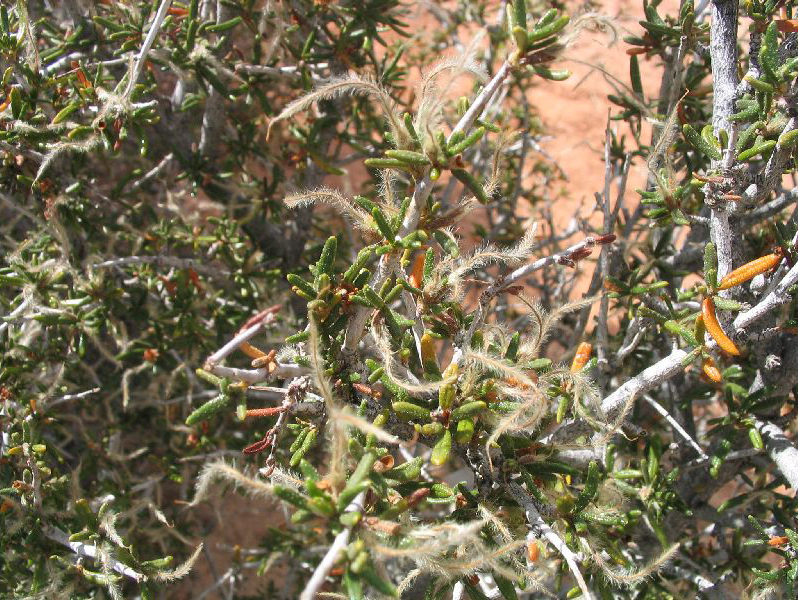

Conservation status
- Secure (NatureServe)

Scientific classification
- Kingdom: Plantae
- Clade: Tracheophytes
- Clade: Angiosperms
- Clade: Eudicots
- Clade: Rosids
- Order: Rosales
- Family: Rosaceae
- Genus: Cercocarpus
- Species: C. intricatus

Binomial name
- Cercocarpus intricatus S. Watson

Synonyms
- Cercocarpus ledifolius var. intricatus (S.Watson) M.E.Jones

= Cercocarpus intricatus =

Variety of flowering plant

Cercocarpus intricatus (little-leaf mountain mahogany, narrowleaf mahogany, dwarf mountain mahogany) is a species of tree that is commonly known as little-leaf mountain mahogany.

== Distribution ==
Cercocarpus intricatus is native to the Southwestern United States, from California to Colorado, where it grows in mostly dry habitat such as deserts. It can be found in rocky places and slopes of mountain brush, pinyon juniper woodland, and ponderosa pine forest vegetation types.

== Description ==
Cercocarpus intricatus is a thickly branched shrub spreading and growing erect to heights between one and three metres (3 and 10 ft). The many short gray twigs on the branches bear tiny, widely spaced evergreen leaves. Each thick, short leaf is a centimetre long or less, rolled under at the edges, and leathery in texture. The inflorescence has two or three flowers. Each flower is a tiny cup merely a few millimetres wide containing several protruding stamens and one pistil. The style remains after the rest of the flower falls away. It is feathery and up to two centimetres (0.79 in) long, with the fruit, an achene, at the tip.

== Uses ==
The Navajo have traditionally produced a reddish-brown vegetable dye from the deep-red bark extracted from the tap-root of the plant, which they used to dye woolen yarns.
