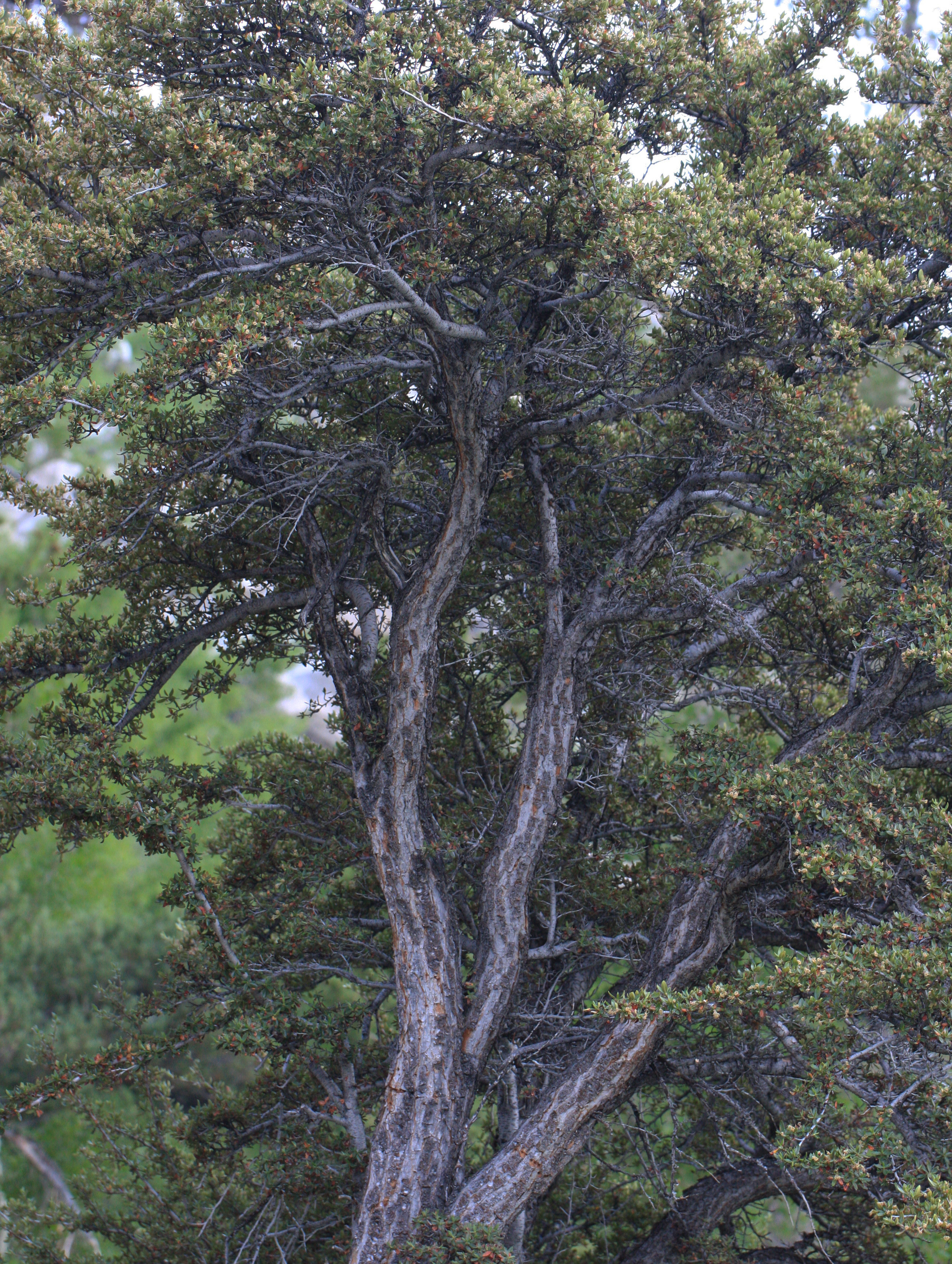

Conservation status
- Least Concern (IUCN 3.1)

- Secure (NatureServe)

Scientific classification
- Kingdom: Plantae
- Clade: Tracheophytes
- Clade: Angiosperms
- Clade: Eudicots
- Clade: Rosids
- Order: Rosales
- Family: Rosaceae
- Genus: Cercocarpus
- Species: C. ledifolius

Binomial name
- Cercocarpus ledifolius Nutt.
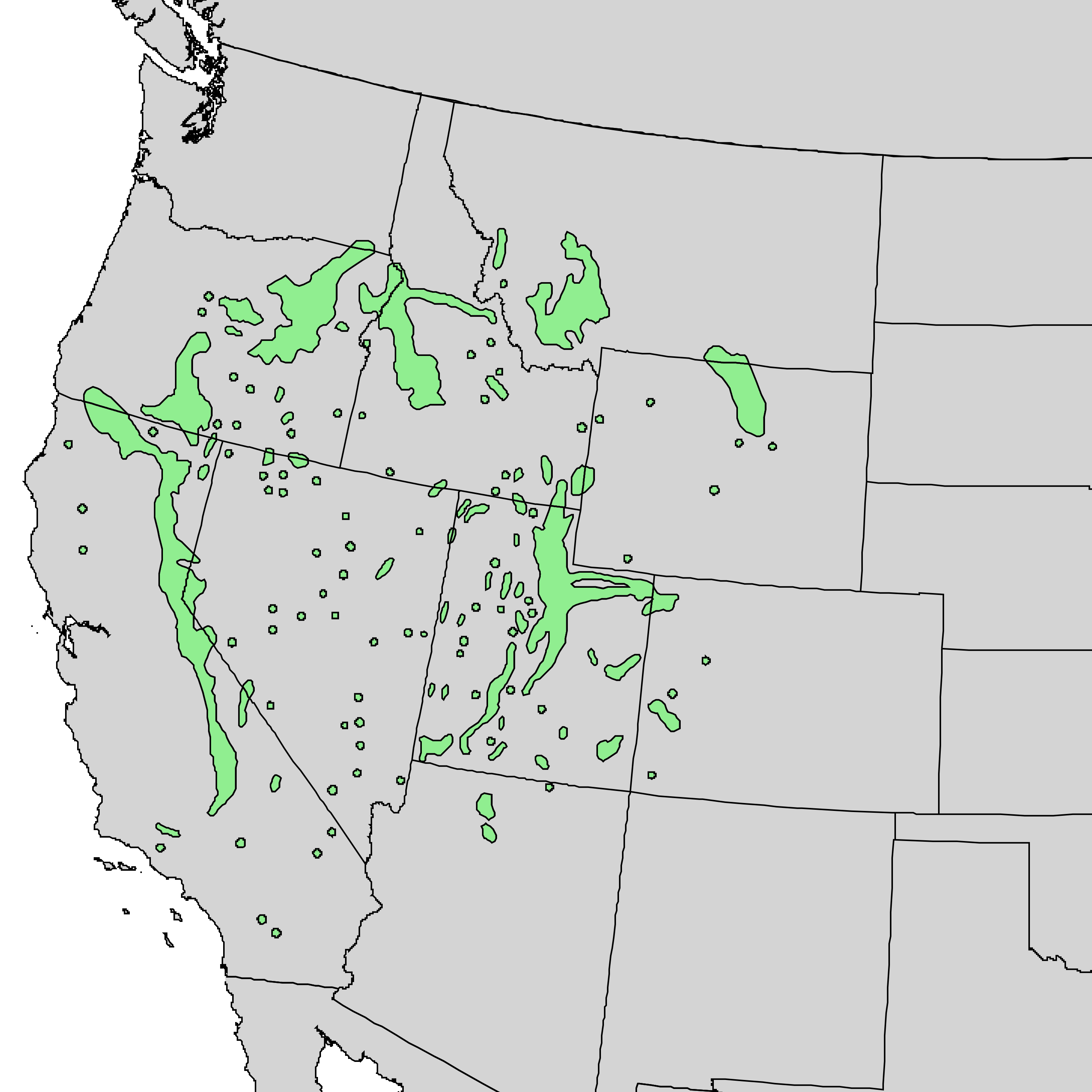
- Natural range of Cercocarpus ledifolius

Synonyms
- Cercocarpus hypoleucus Rydb.; Cercocarpus ledifolius var. hypoleucus (Rydb.) M.Peck

= Cercocarpus ledifolius =

Species of tree

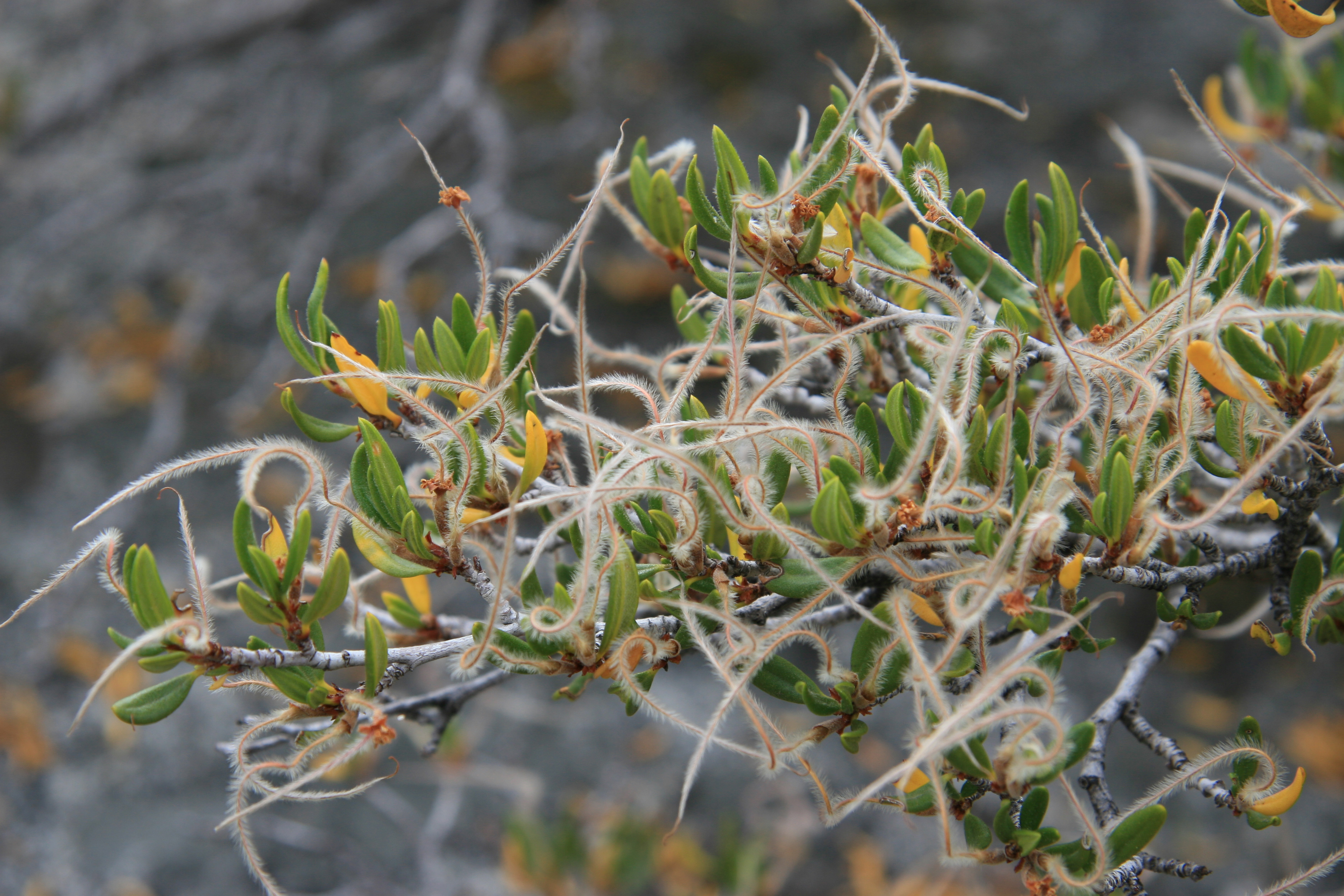
Curl-leaf mountain mahogany branch with curly, fuzzy fruit

Cercocarpus ledifolius is a North American species of mountain mahogany known by the common name curl-leaf mountain mahogany.

== Description ==
Cercocarpus ledifolius is a large, densely branching tree which can reach heights of 11 metres (36 feet), although it is not uncommon to find the adult plant as a shrub as short as 1 m (3 1/2 ft). Its leathery, sticky, dark green leaves are up to 4 centimetres (1 1/2 inches) long and lance-shaped, and the edges may curl under. The flower consists of a small tan tube from which protrudes a long, plumelike style covered in luxuriant tan hairs. The flowers are arranged in inflorescences of up to 3. The fruit is a hairy achene .5–1 cm long.

Cercocarpus ledifolius is slow-growing, sometimes taking up to a century to reach full height. The oldest specimens are thought to be around 1,350 years old, although the primary specimen that yielded this estimate was cut down. This makes it one of the longest-lived known flowering plants.

== Distribution and habitat ==
The species is widespread across much of the Western United States as well as Baja California in Mexico. It can be found at elevations ranging from 600 to 3,000 m (1,970 to 9,840 ft), with the preferred altitude varying depending on the region. It prefers shallow, well-drained soils with a sandy or grainy consistency, and is generally found in areas which receive only 15–26 cm (6–10 in) annual precipitation. This makes it common on low mountains and slopes, where it grows in scattered groves among other drought-resistant species such as pinyon pines, junipers and sagebrush.

== Ecology ==
The leaves are eaten by deer year-round.

== Uses ==
The Gosiute Native Americans used the wood to make their bows. The species has many medicinal uses for various Native American groups, such as the Paiute and Shoshone.
