= Gundlachia triantha =

Scientific classification
- Kingdom: Plantae
- Clade: Tracheophytes
- Clade: Angiosperms
- Clade: Eudicots
- Clade: Asterids
- Order: Asterales
- Family: Asteraceae
- Genus: Gundlachia
- Species: G. triantha

Binomial name
- Gundlachia triantha (S.F.Blake) Urbatsch & R.P.Roberts 2004

Synonyms
- Haplopappus trianthus S.F.Blake; Aplopappus trianthus S.F.Blake; Ericameria triantha (S.F.Blake) Shinners; Xylothamia triantha (S.F.Blake) G.L. Nesom

Species of flowering plant

Gundlachia triantha, the TransPecos goldenshrub or Trans-Pecos desert goldenrod, is a North American species of plants in the sunflower family. It is native to northern Mexico (Chihuahua, Coahuila, Durango, Nuevo León), with the range extending just over the Río Grande into western Texas in and near Big Bend National Park.

Gundlachia triantha is a shrub up to 200 cm (6 1/2 ft) tall. The plant produces flower heads in clumps of 3–5 at the ends of small branches. Each head contains 3–7 disc flowers but no ray flowers.
