= Aquilula =

Scientific classification
- Kingdom: Plantae
- Clade: Tracheophytes
- Clade: Angiosperms
- Clade: Eudicots
- Clade: Asterids
- Order: Asterales
- Family: Asteraceae
- Subfamily: Asteroideae
- Tribe: Astereae
- Subtribe: Gutiereziinae
- Genus: Aquilula; G.L.Nesom
- Species: A. riskindii

Binomial name
- Aquilula riskindii (B.L.Turner & G.Langford) G.L.Nesom

Genus of flowering plants

Aquilula is a genus of flowering plants belonging to the family Asteraceae. It contains a singles species, Aquilula riskindii.

Its native range is Northeastern Mexico.
