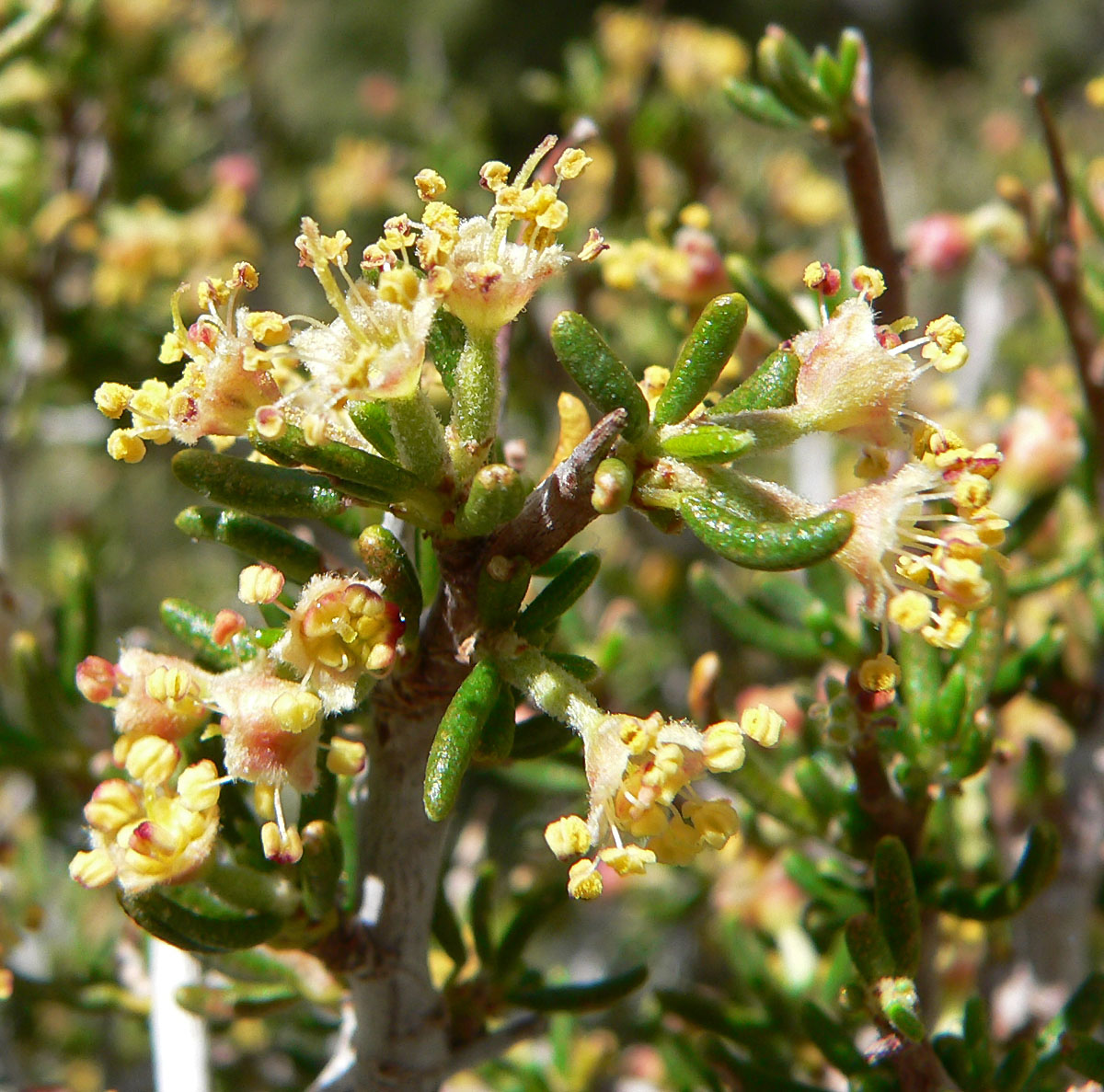
- C. ledifolius var. intricatus

Scientific classification
- Kingdom: Plantae
- Clade: Tracheophytes
- Clade: Angiosperms
- Clade: Eudicots
- Clade: Rosids
- Order: Rosales
- Family: Rosaceae
- Subfamily: Dryadoideae
- Genus: Cercocarpus; Kunth

Species
- Several, see text

Synonyms
- Bertolonia Moc. & Sessé ex DC.

= Cercocarpus =

Genus of flowering plants

Cercocarpus, commonly known as mountain mahogany, is a small genus of at least nine species of nitrogen-fixing flowering plants in the rose family, Rosaceae. They are native to the western United States and northern Mexico, where they grow in chaparral and semidesert habitats and climates, often at high altitudes. Several are found in the California chaparral and woodlands ecoregion.

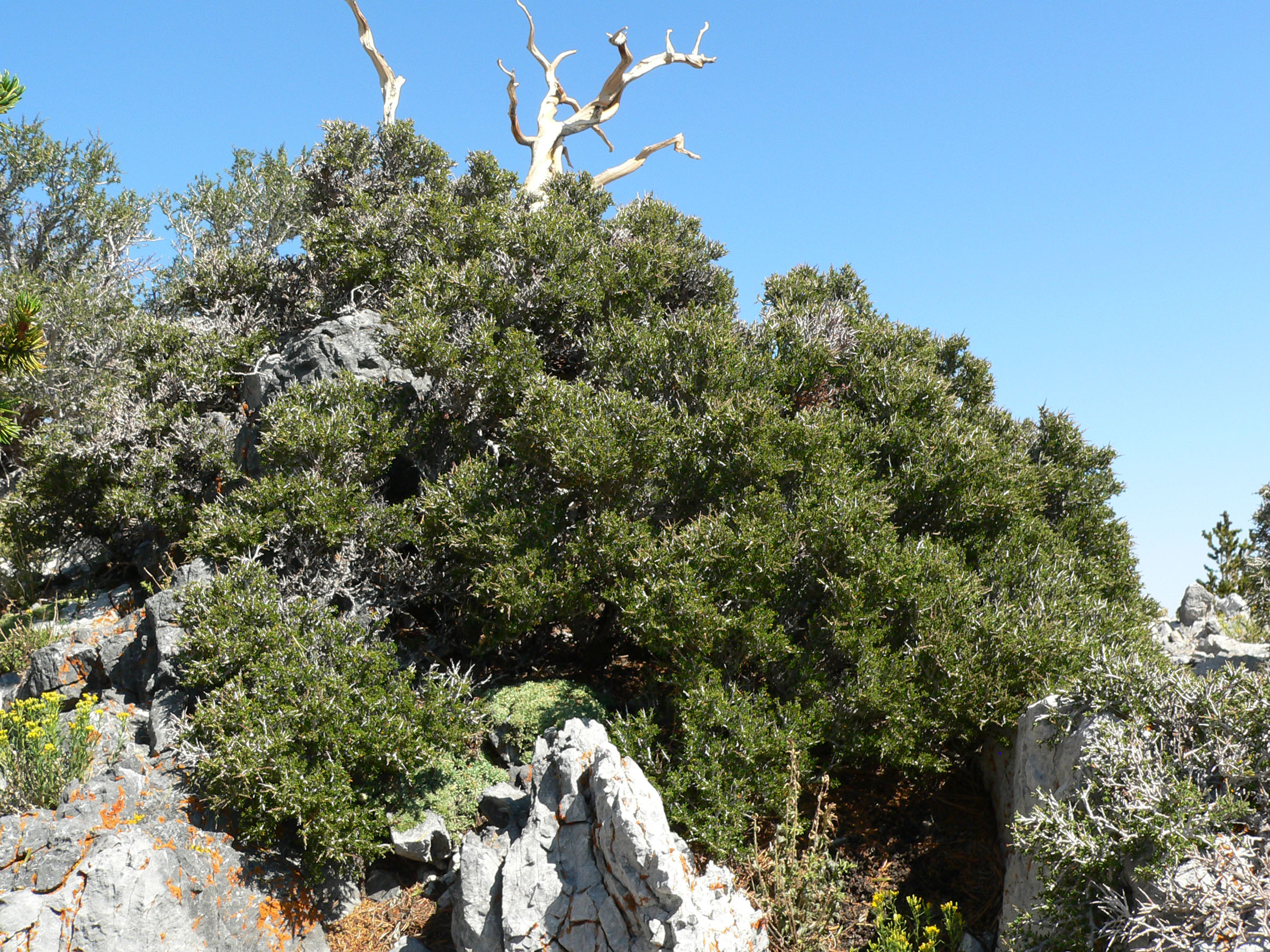
Cercocarpus intricatus, Spring Mountains, southern Nevada (elevation about 2700 m)

The classification of Cercocarpus within the Rosaceae has been unclear. The genus has been placed in the subfamily Rosoideae, but is now placed in subfamily Dryadoideae.

Members of the genus are deciduous shrubs or small trees, typically reaching heights of 3–6 m (9–18 ft) tall, but exceptionally up to 13 m (40 ft) high. C. montanus usually remains under 1 m (3 ft) high because of incessant grazing by elk and deer.

The name is derived from the Greek words κέρκος (kerkos), meaning "tail" and καρπός (karpos), meaning "fruit". It refers to the tail-like plume on the fruits.

== Taxonomy ==
=== Species ===
Cercocarpus comprises the following species:

- Cercocarpus betuloides Nutt. – birch-leaf mountain mahogany
  - var. betuloides Nutt.
  - var. blancheae (C.K. Schneid.) Little – island mountain mahogany
  - var. traskiae (Eastw.) Dunkle – Catalina Island mountain mahogany
- Cercocarpus breviflorus A. Gray – hairy mountain mahogany
- Cercocarpus douglasii Rydb.
- Cercocarpus fothergilloides Kunth
  - var. fothergilloides Kunth
  - var. mojadensis (C.K. Schneid.) Henrickson
- Cercocarpus intricatus S.Watson
- Cercocarpus ledifolius Nutt. ex Torr. & A.Gray – curl-leaf mountain mahogany
- Cercocarpus macrophyllus C.K.Schneid.
- Cercocarpus mexicanus Henrard
- Cercocarpus mojadensis C.K.Schneid.
- Cercocarpus montanus Raf.
  - var. argenteus (Rydb.) F.L.Martin – silver mountain mahogany
  - var. glaber (S.Watson) F.L.Martin
  - var. macrourus (Rydb.) F.L.Martin
  - var. minutiflorus (Abrams) F.L.Martin – smooth mountain mahogany
  - var. montanus Raf. – alder-leaf mountain mahogany
  - var. paucidentatus (S.Watson) F.L.Martin
- Cercocarpus pringlei (C.K.Schneid.) Rydb.
- Cercocarpus rotundifolius Rydb.
- Cercocarpus rzedowskii Henrard

=== Species names with uncertain taxonomic status ===
The status of the following species and hybrids is unresolved:

- Cercocarpus antiquus Lesq.
- Cercocarpus arizonicus M.E.Jones
- Cercocarpus betulaefolius C.K.Schneid.
- Cercocarpus betulaefolius Nutt. ex Hook.
- Cercocarpus breviflorus S.Watson
- Cercocarpus cuneatus Dorf
- Cercocarpus fothergilloides Torr.
- Cercocarpus harneyensis C.A.Arnold
- Cercocarpus macrophyllus C.K.Schneid.
- Cercocarpus miniscalchii (A.Massal.) Principi
- Cercocarpus orestesi Knowlt.
- Cercocarpus pallidus Wooton
- Cercocarpus parviflorus Wooton
- Cercocarpus parvifolius Nutt. ex Hook. & Arn.
- Cercocarpus praefoliolosa R.W.Br.
- Cercocarpus praeledifolius E.W.Berry
- Cercocarpus ravenscragensis E.W.Berry
- Cercocarpus treleasei C.K.Schneid.
