= Cuniculotinus =

Conservation status
- Apparently Secure (NatureServe)

Scientific classification
- Kingdom: Plantae
- Clade: Tracheophytes
- Clade: Angiosperms
- Clade: Eudicots
- Clade: Asterids
- Order: Asterales
- Family: Asteraceae
- Subfamily: Asteroideae
- Tribe: Astereae
- Subtribe: Solidagininae
- Genus: Cuniculotinus; Urbatsch, R.P. Roberts & Neubig
- Species: C. gramineus

Binomial name
- Cuniculotinus gramineus (H.M.Hall) Urbatsch, R.P.Roberts & Neubig

Synonyms
- Chrysothamnus gramineus H.M.Hall; Ericameria graminea (H.M.Hall) L.C.Anderson; Petradoria discoidea L.C.Anderson

Genus of flowering plants

Cuniculotinus is a genus of flowering plants in the family Asteraceae.

== Species ==
There is only one known species, Cuniculotinus gramineus. It is native to the Great Basin deserts of California in Inyo County; and of southern Nevada in Nye, Lincoln, and Clark Counties.
