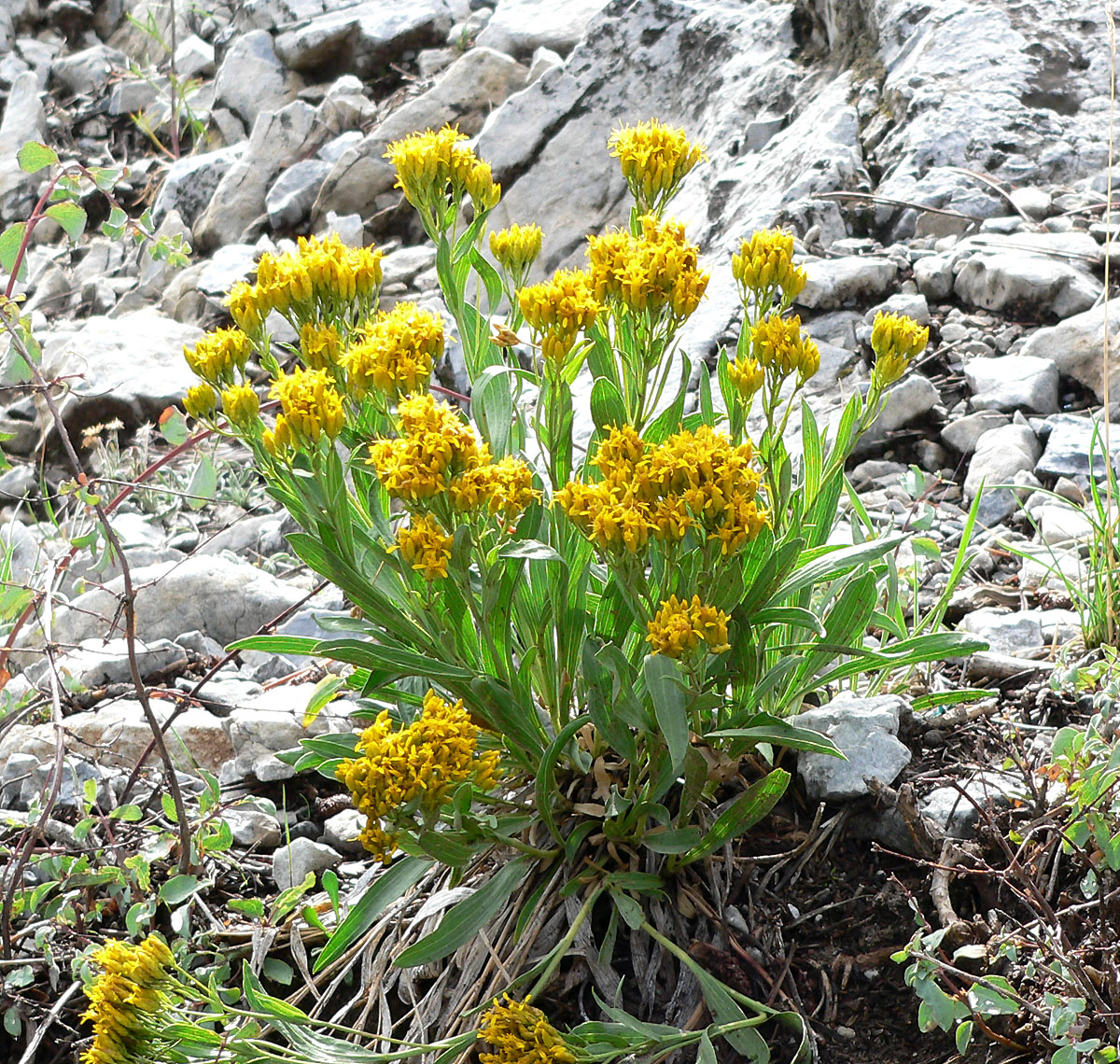
- Petradoria pumila subsp. pumila

Conservation status
- Secure (NatureServe)

Scientific classification
- Kingdom: Plantae
- Clade: Tracheophytes
- Clade: Angiosperms
- Clade: Eudicots
- Clade: Asterids
- Order: Asterales
- Family: Asteraceae
- Subfamily: Asteroideae
- Tribe: Astereae
- Subtribe: Solidagininae
- Genus: Petradoria; Greene
- Species: P. pumila

Binomial name
- Petradoria pumila (Nutt.) Greene

Synonyms
- Chrysoma pumila Nutt.; Solidago pumila (Nutt.) Torr. & A.Gray; Aster pumilus Kuntze

= Petradoria =

Genus of shrubs

Petradoria is a genus of North American subshrubs in the tribe Astereae within the family Asteraceae.

== Species ==
The only known species is Petradoria pumila, known by the common name rock goldenrod. It is native to the western United States (California, Arizona, Nevada, Utah, New Mexico, Colorado, Wyoming, Idaho). It is quite common in some regions, carpeting areas in yellow blooms.

Formerly included

Petradoria discoidea L.C.Anderson - Cuniculotinus gramineus (H.M.Hall) Urbatsch, R.P.Roberts & Neubig

Subspecies

- Petradoria pumila subsp. pumila
- Petradoria pumila subsp. graminea (Wooton & Standl.) L.C.Anderson
