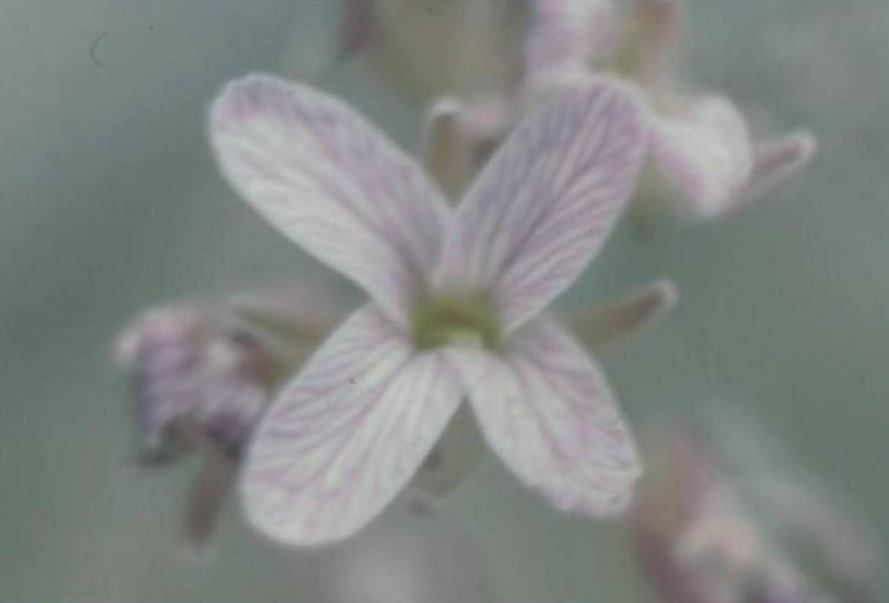

Conservation status
- Critically Imperiled (NatureServe)

Scientific classification
- Kingdom: Plantae
- Clade: Tracheophytes
- Clade: Angiosperms
- Clade: Eudicots
- Clade: Rosids
- Order: Brassicales
- Family: Brassicaceae
- Genus: Hesperidanthus
- Species: H. argillaceus

Binomial name
- Hesperidanthus argillaceus (S.L.Welsh & N.D.Atwood) Al-Shehbaz

Synonyms
- Schoenocrambe argillacea (S.L.Welsh & N.D.Atwood) Rollins; Thelypodiopsis argillacea S.L.Welsh & N.D.Atwood

= Hesperidanthus argillaceus =

Species of flowering plant

Hesperidanthus argillaceus, syn. Schoenocrambe argillacea, is a species of flowering plant in the mustard family, known by the common names clay reed-mustard, Uinta Basin plainsmustard, and clay thelypody.

== Description ==
Hesperidanthus argillaceus is a perennial herb with one or more erect stems growing 13 to 30 centimeters tall from a caudex. The leaves are linear in shape, long and narrow with smooth edges, and reach up to 4 centimeters in length. The leaves are fleshy and have a white waxy coating.

The inflorescence is a raceme of mustardlike flowers. Each flower has purple sepals and four centimeter-long white or pale purple petals with purple veining.

The fruit is a curved silique roughly 2 to 5 centimeters long.

== Distribution ==
The plant is endemic to northeastern Utah in the Western United States, where it is known only from within Uintah County.

This mustard grows in the Uinta Basin on the Green River Formation, a geological formation near the edge of the Uinta Formation, both of the Colorado Plateau region. The habitat is rocky, with steep cliffs of gypsum-rich clay covered in a layer of sandstone scree. The ground is bedrock or shale barrens littered with loose rock and fine soils. The plants grow in exposed areas and in sheltered areas on these barren slopes, the largest plants occurring in protected nooks in the rock. The area is a desert shrub plant community.

Other plants in the habitat include Torrey's jointfir (Ephedra torreyana), shadscale (Atriplex confertifolia), Nuttall's horsebrush (Tetradymia nuttallii), Utah serviceberry (Amelanchier utahensis), black sagebrush (Artemisia nova), lesser rushy milkvetch (Astragalus convallarius), Mojave brickellbush (Brickellia oblongifolia), yellow rabbitbrush (Chrysothamnus viscidiflorus), cushion buckwheat (Eriogonum ovalifolium), Fendler's sandmat (Euphorbia fendleri), granite prickly phlox (Linanthus pungens), fleshy beardtongue (Penstemon carnosus), rock goldenrod (Petradoria pumila), northern Indian parsnip (Cymopterus terebinthinus), Indian ricegrass (Stipa hymenoides), and shortspine horsebrush (Tetradymia spinosa).

== Conservation ==
The plant is federally listed as a Critically endangered species of the United States.

Hesperidanthus argillaceus is limited to a small section of the Uinta basin in Uintah County. There are six or seven occurrences of the plant, making up three populations. The total number of plants is under 10,000. The main threat to this rare plant is oil and gas exploration in its habitat, and, potentially the mining of the oil shale that occurs under the whole area of the plant's distribution. Another threat is the use of off-road vehicles in the habitat.
