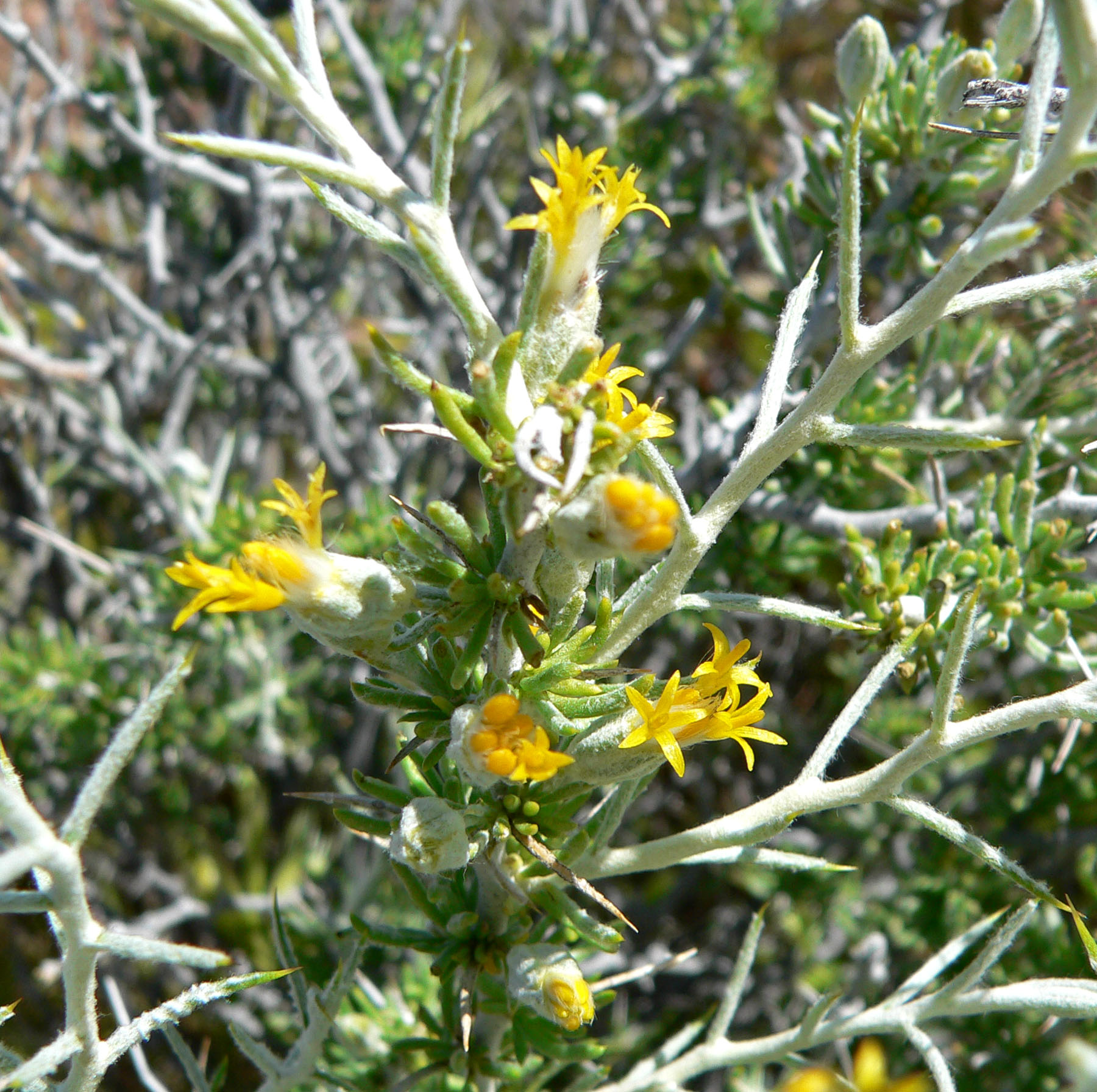
- Tetradymia axillaris

Scientific classification
- Kingdom: Plantae
- Clade: Tracheophytes
- Clade: Angiosperms
- Clade: Eudicots
- Clade: Asterids
- Order: Asterales
- Family: Asteraceae
- Subfamily: Asteroideae
- Tribe: Senecioneae
- Genus: Tetradymia; DC.

Type species
- Tetradymia canescens DC.

= Tetradymia =

Genus of flowering plants

Tetradymia is a genus of North American shrubs in the groundsel tribe within the sunflower family. Horsebrush is a common name for plants in this genus.

Species

- Tetradymia argyraea - CA (Riverside + San Bernardino Cos), AZ (Mohave Co), NV (Clark Co)
- Tetradymia axillaris - CA AZ NV UT
- Tetradymia canescens - BC WA ID MT WY OR CA NV UT CO AZ NM
- Tetradymia comosa - CA NV
- Tetradymia filifolia - NM
- Tetradymia glabrata - CA NV UT OR ID
- Tetradymia nuttallii - NV UT CO WY
- Tetradymia spinosa - CA OR NV ID UT MT WY CO NM
- Tetradymia stenolepis - CA NV AZ
- Tetradymia tetrameres - NV CA (Mono Co)

Formerly included

See Lepidospartum and Psathyrotes.

- Tetradymia ramosissima - Psathyrotes ramosissima
- Tetradymia squamata - Lepidospartum squamatum
