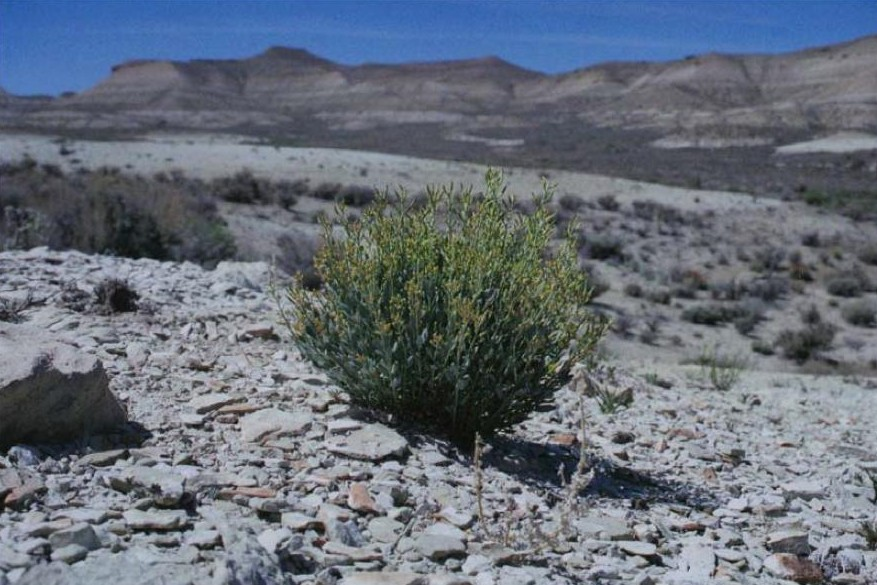

Conservation status
- Critically Imperiled (NatureServe)

Scientific classification
- Kingdom: Plantae
- Clade: Tracheophytes
- Clade: Angiosperms
- Clade: Eudicots
- Clade: Rosids
- Order: Brassicales
- Family: Brassicaceae
- Genus: Hesperidanthus
- Species: H. suffrutescens

Binomial name
- Hesperidanthus suffrutescens (Rollins) Al-Shehbaz

Synonyms
- Glaucocarpum suffrutescens (Rollins) Rollins; Schoenocrambe suffrutescens (Rollins) S.L.Welsh & Chatterley; Thelypodium suffrutescens Rollins

= Hesperidanthus suffrutescens =

Genus of flowering plants

Hesperidanthus suffrutescens is a species of flowering plant in the mustard family. Its synonyms include Glaucocarpum suffrutescens. When placed in the genus Glaucocarpum, it was the only species. It is a rare species known by the common names toad-flax cress, shrubby reed-mustard, Uinta Basin waxfruit and waxfruit mustard. It is endemic to Utah in the United States, where it is known only from Duchesne and Uintah Counties. It is threatened by habitat degradation and destruction. It is federally listed as an endangered species of the United States.

== Description ==
This is a perennial shrub growing 10 to 35 centimetres tall (when it is not flowering) with multiple erect stems. These stems grow from a branched woody caudex. The shrub is distinctly caespitose.

The leaves are lance-shaped or somewhat oval in shape with smooth or slightly toothed edges, the blades measuring up to 2.5 centimetres in length. The inflorescence is a raceme of mustard-like flowers. Each flower has yellow-green sepals and four yellow petals each measuring about a centimetre long. The fruit is a curved silique 1 or 2 centimetres long.

== Taxonomy ==
The plant was first described as Thelypodium suffrutescens by Reed Clark Rollins in 1937. The type specimens had been collected by the botanist Edward Harrison Graham in the Uinta Basin of Utah, and Rollins' first 1937 description was published in Graham's account of the species found here. In this description Rollins mentioned that he was not entirely convinced about his own taxonomic classification, because the species with its woody caudex appeared very different from species in the genus Thelypodium, but closest to Th. elegans (now generally considered to be classified as Thelypodiopsis elegans), although he could not be certain, as Graham had only collected specimens with immature fruit. Rollins visited locality in the Uinta Basin on 15 June 1937 for himself, and was convinced of the uniqueness of his new species. The following year he revised his earlier assessment, and created a new monotypic genus for the species, renaming it Glaucocarpum suffrutescens.

The species was reclassified as Schoenocrambe suffrutescens by Stanley Larson Welsh and L. M. Chatterley in 1985, although this was not a popular move: most documentation continued to use Glaucocarpum. In 2005 the Iraqi Brassicaceae expert Ihsan Ali Al-Shehbaz placed the species in Hesperidanthus as H. suffrutescens, which is followed in the Flora of North America in the 2010 book about the Brassicaceae (written by Al-Shehbaz), but not by the United States Fish and Wildlife Service, which used the name Schoenocrambe suffrutescens in 2010.

The specific epithet suffrutescens is Latin and means 'shrubby'.

== Distribution ==
It is endemic to Utah in the United States, where it is known only from Duchesne and Uintah Counties. There are seven populations of the plant located in three main areas. Five of the seven populations contain 250 or fewer plants.

== Ecology ==
This mustard grows in the Uinta Basin on the Green River Formation, a geologic formation, in an area around the border between Duchesne and Uintah Counties in Utah. The substrate is a shallow layer of dry, alkaline, fine clay and white calcareous shale. Rollins mentions that at the type locality the Green River Formation surfaces in a high mountain bluff in a layer only some 20 feet wide, but some three miles long; this species only grows in small clumps studding this specific strip of dirt all down its length, and not in the other soils left or right. The climate is extremely dry. The area is a desert shrub or pinyon-juniper woodland plant community. It grows at an altitude of 1555–1981 metres, on flat or very moderately sloping ground. The area is sparsely vegetated, but other plants in the habitat include Barneby's catseye (Cryptantha barnebyi), which was apparently discovered by Rollins during his 1937 visit, C. nana, C. grahamii, Yucca harrimaniae, Linum leptopoda, Mentzelia goodrichii, Gilia polycladon, Erigeron argentatus and Hymenopappus lugens. Cryptantha barnebyi, C. grahamii, the Mentzelia and Linum all appear to be similarly restricted to this area, or nearly so in the last case. It flowers in May to July. The plant is pollinated by several species of bees, likely including Dialictus perdifficilis, D. sedi, Evylaeus pulveris, Andrena walleye, A. prunorum and Halictus rubicundus.

== Conservation ==
This plant is threatened by hydrocarbon exploration and the mining of oil shale and tar sands. All the populations of the plant are located on land which has been leased for oil and gas exploration. Its habitat is located over a large deposit of oil shale which may be a target for extraction. When the plant was added to the Endangered Species List, parts of populations had been destroyed during energy development activities. The populations are already somewhat isolated due to habitat fragmentation, which is increased by roads running through the area. Dust from the roads and from energy activity may negatively affect the plant in several ways. Some of the processes that affect the habitat and the plant also affect the plant's pollinators, such as bees. Other threats include off-road vehicle use, grazing, and the mining of surface rock for use as building stone.
