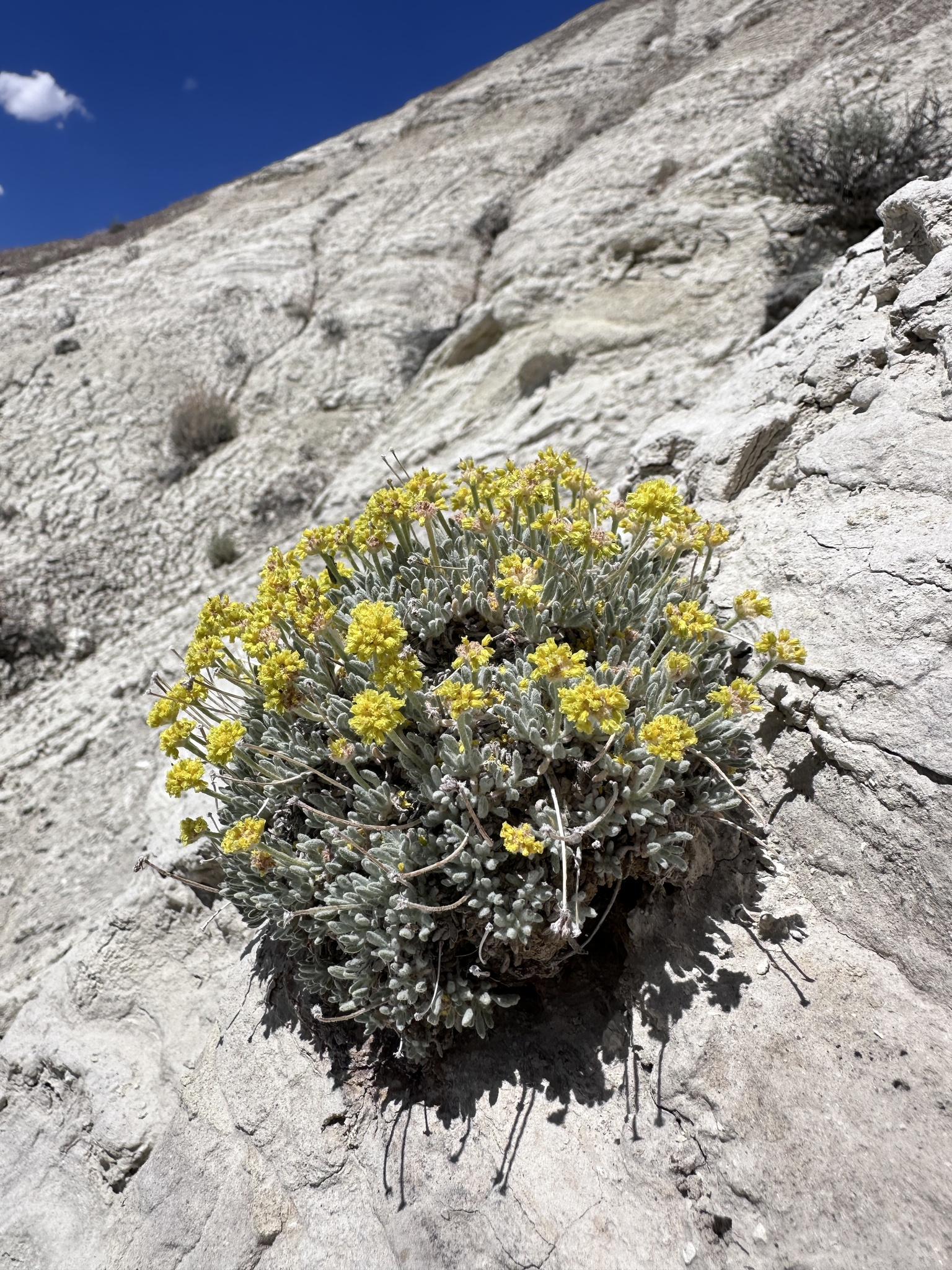
- Little High Rock Canyon Wilderness, Washoe County, Nevada

Conservation status
- Apparently Secure (NatureServe)

Scientific classification
- Kingdom: Plantae
- Clade: Embryophytes
- Clade: Tracheophytes
- Clade: Angiosperms
- Clade: Eudicots
- Order: Caryophyllales
- Family: Polygonaceae
- Genus: Eriogonum
- Species: E. crosbyae

Binomial name
- Eriogonum crosbyae Reveal

Varieties
- E. c. var. crosbyae; E. c. var. mystrium

= Eriogonum crosbyae =

Species of wild buckwheat

Eriogonum crosbyae is a species of wild buckwheat known by the common name Crosby's buckwheat. It is native to southcentral Oregon and northwestern Nevada in the United States. Some treatments include plants in Montana and Idaho as members of this species. This plant was first discovered in the Guano Valley in Lake County, Oregon, in 1978 by Bureau of Land Management botanist Virginia Crosby, and it was named for her in 1981.

This perennial herb forms mats of stems from a branching caudex. It is hairless to hairy to woolly in texture and sometimes glandular, and it is greenish or grayish in color. The woolly leaves are up to 3 centimeters long. The inflorescence is a headlike cluster of yellow or cream flowers.

This plant only grows in tuff, a soil composed of volcanic ash, or tuffaceous sandstone. The substrate is light tan to white in color. There are few other plants around but species in the habitat may include Astragalus spp., Atriplex confertifolia, Chrysothamnus nauseosus, Tetradymia glabrata, Artemisia spp., Elymus cinereus, Stanleya viridiflora, Sphaeralcea sp., Ipomopsis congesta, Astragalus tiehmii, and Cryptantha schoolcraftii.

Mining is a significant threat to this species. Most Nevada occurrences are on land leased by mining operations. This plant's specific habitat type is targeted for mining. Mining has already destroyed some occurrences. "Range improvement projects" are another type of threat. Off-road vehicles are in use in the area. The plant also appears to have low recruitment.

== Taxonomy ==
The botanist James L. Reveal scientifically described this species placing it in the Eriogonum genus with the name Eriogonum crosbyae. Along with the rest of its genus it is classified in the Polygonaceae family. The species has two accepted varieties.

- Eriogonum crosbyae var. crosbyae – Native to Idaho, Nevada, Oregon, and Montana
- Eriogonum crosbyae var. mystrium – Native to Idaho, Nevada, and Oregon
