= Podistera nevadensis =

Sierra podistera

Scientific classification
- Kingdom: Plantae
- Clade: Tracheophytes
- Clade: Angiosperms
- Clade: Eudicots
- Clade: Asterids
- Order: Apiales
- Family: Apiaceae
- Genus: Podistera
- Species: P. nevadensis

Binomial name
- Podistera nevadensis (A.Gray) S.Watson

Species of plant

Podistera nevadensis is an uncommon species of flowering plant in the carrot family known by the common names Sierra podistera and Nevada podistera.

== Description ==
Podistera nevadensis is a perennial herb forming a dense cushion in rock crevices, spreading up to half a meter wide and only a few centimeters tall. It grows from a taproot and it has no real stem, forming a mat of leaves. The fleshy pale green leaves are no more than a centimeter long. Each is divided into tiny, pointed leaflets. The leaves are coated in short, rough, whitish hairs.

The inflorescence is a compound umbel on a peduncle up to 3 centimeters tall. It bears several yellow flowers contained in a cuplike unit of fused bractlets.

== Distribution ==
Podistera nevadensis is endemic to California, where it is known only from the highest peaks of the Sierra Nevada, the White and Inyo Mountains, and the San Bernardino Mountains. It is a plant of alpine climates above the tree line, growing in gravel and talus.
