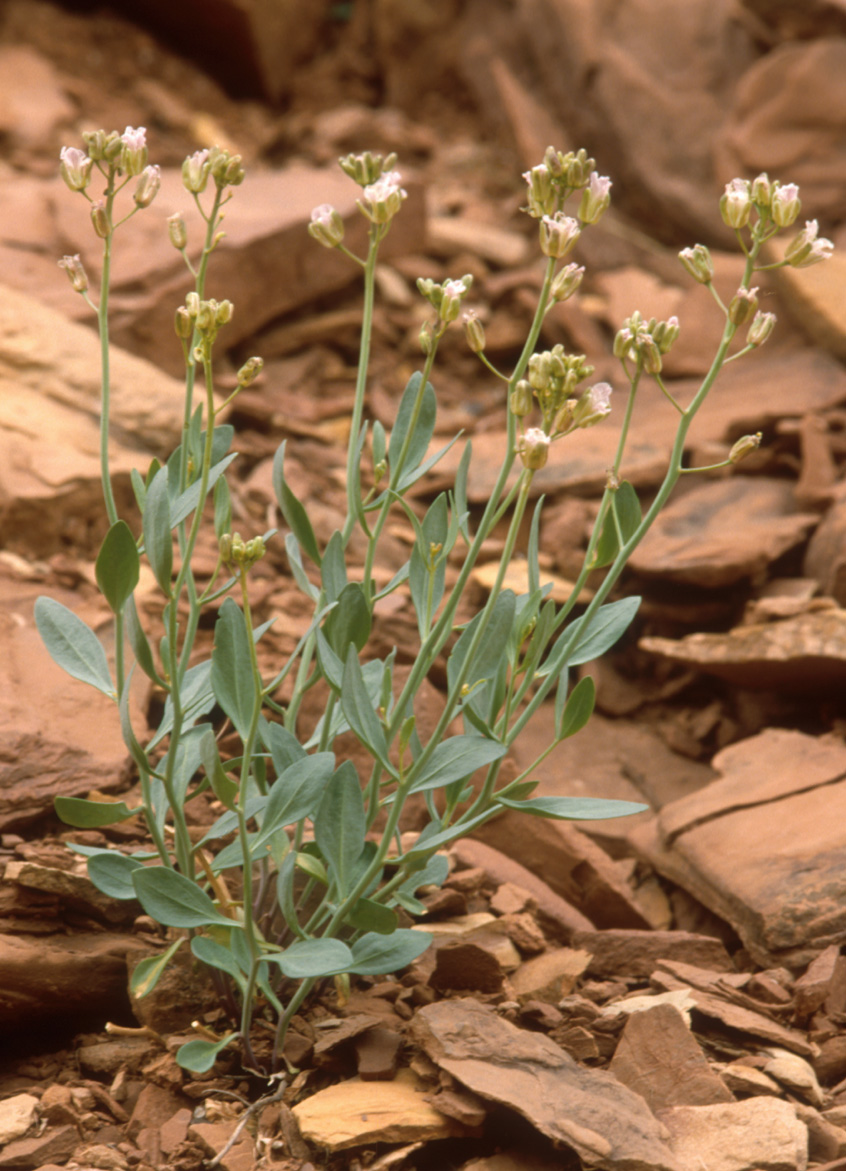

Conservation status
- Critically Imperiled (NatureServe)

Scientific classification
- Kingdom: Plantae
- Clade: Tracheophytes
- Clade: Angiosperms
- Clade: Eudicots
- Clade: Rosids
- Order: Brassicales
- Family: Brassicaceae
- Genus: Hesperidanthus
- Species: H. barnebyi

Binomial name
- Hesperidanthus barnebyi (S.L.Welsh & N.D.Atwood) Al-Shehbaz

Synonyms
- Schoenocrambe barnebyi (S.L.Welsh & N.D.Atwood) Rollins; Thelypodiopsis barnebyi S.L.Welsh & N.D.Atwood

= Hesperidanthus barnebyi =

Species of flowering plant in the mustard family

Hesperidanthus barnebyi, syn. Schoenocrambe barnebyi, is a species of flowering plant in the mustard family, known by the common names Barneby reed-mustard, Syes Butte plainsmustard, and Barneby thelypody. It is endemic to Utah in the United States, where it is known only from Emery and Wayne Counties. It is threatened by habitat degradation and destruction. It is federally listed as an endangered species of the United States.

This is a perennial herb with multiple erect stems growing 10 to 38 centimeters tall from a caudex. The leaves are oblong or oval in shape with smooth or slightly toothed edges, the blades measuring up to 5 centimeters in length. The inflorescence is a raceme of mustardlike flowers. Each flower has green or purple sepals and four white or pale purple petals with purple veining, each petal measuring about a centimeter long. The fruit is a curved silique roughly 2 to 5 centimeters long.

This mustard grows in the San Rafael Swell on Bureau of Land Management territory in Emery County. The only other population is located in Capitol Reef National Park in Wayne County. The habitat is dry and mostly barren of vegetation. The substrate is fine, eroding red clay containing large amounts of selenium and gypsum. The area is a desert shrub plant community. Other plants in the habitat include sweet sand verbena (Abronia fragrans), shadscale (Atriplex confertifolia), Utah serviceberry (Amelanchier utahensis), tarragon (Artemisia dracunculus), rubber rabbitbrush (Chrysothamnus nauseosus), Torrey's jointfir (Ephedra torreyana), green ephedra (Ephedra viridis), fluffgrass (Erioneuron pulchellum), Nuttall's povertyweed (Monolepis nuttalliana), dropseed grasses (Sporobolus) sp., and desert princesplume (Stanleya pinnata).

There are 2000 to 3000 individuals of this plant remaining, but there may be more on nearby rugged terrain that is hard to explore. This mustard is threatened by uranium mining at the San Rafael Swell location. While most of the mines are now inactive, they are still maintained and there is a road running right through the population. The other population experiences trampling damage from hikers.
