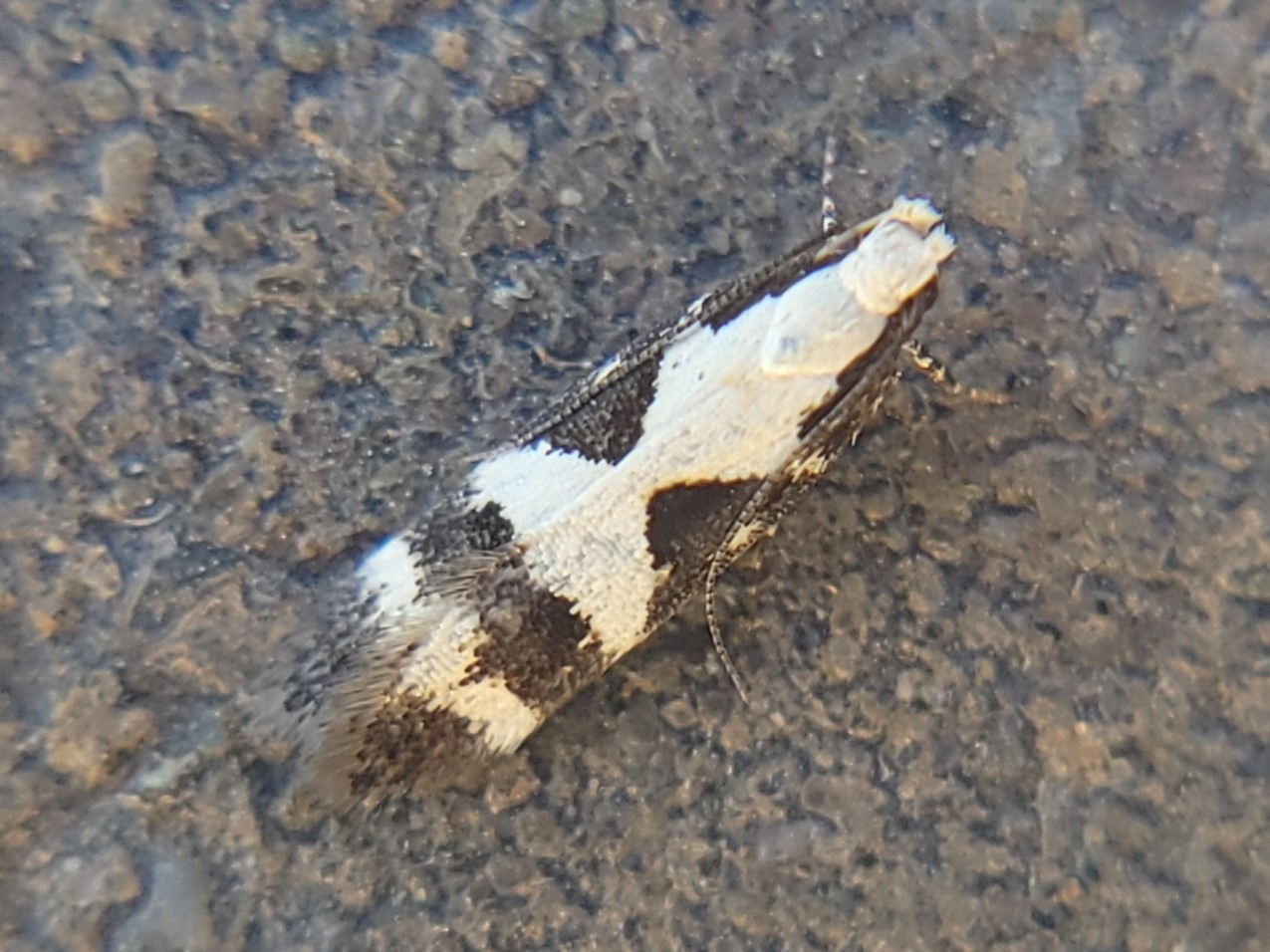

Scientific classification
- Kingdom: Animalia
- Phylum: Arthropoda
- Clade: Pancrustacea
- Class: Insecta
- Order: Lepidoptera
- Family: Gelechiidae
- Genus: Chionodes
- Species: C. fructuaria

Binomial name
- Chionodes fructuaria (Braun, 1925)

Synonyms
- Gelechia fructuaria Braun, 1925; Chionodes fructuarius

= Chionodes fructuaria =

Species of moth

Chionodes fructuaria is a species of moth in the family Gelechiidae. It is found in North America, where it has been recorded from Alberta, California, Arizona, Wyoming, Utah, Idaho, Colorado, Nevada, New Mexico, Texas and Florida.

The wingspan is 13–15 mm. The forewings are dark brown or blackish, with a sprinkling of paler scales in the apex. The markings are pale yellow or whitish. The hindwings are pale grey, shading to darker outwardly.

The larvae feed on Atriplex confertifolia.
