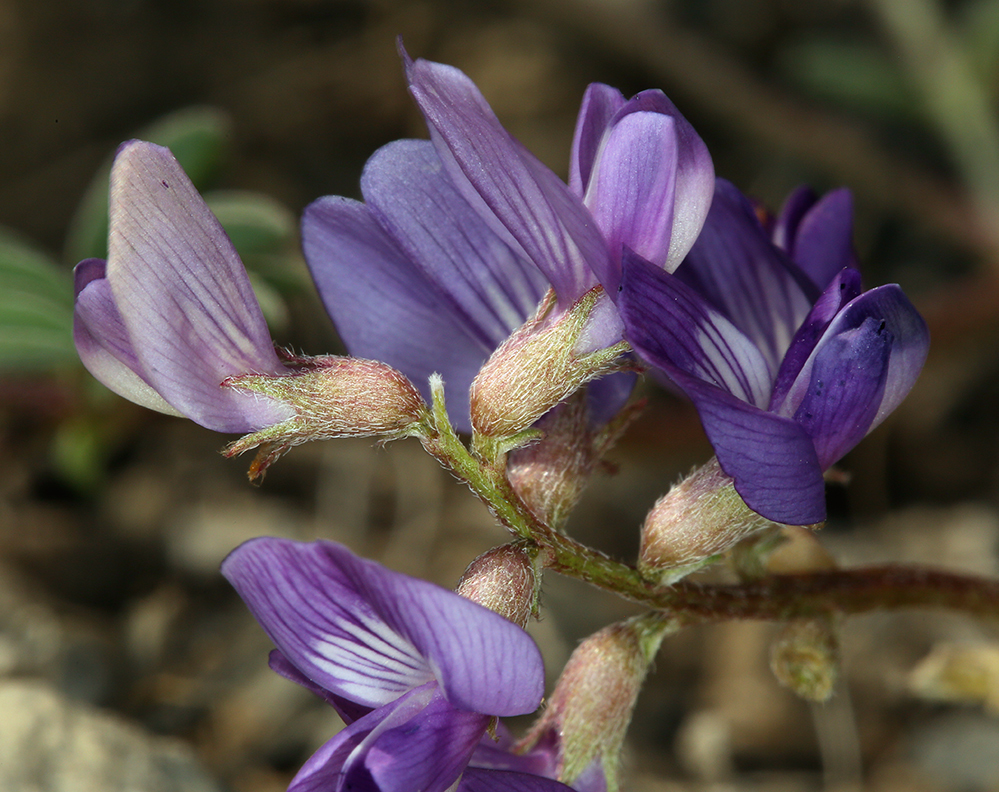

Conservation status
- Near Threatened (IUCN 3.1)

Scientific classification
- Kingdom: Plantae
- Clade: Tracheophytes
- Clade: Angiosperms
- Clade: Eudicots
- Clade: Rosids
- Order: Fabales
- Family: Fabaceae
- Subfamily: Faboideae
- Genus: Astragalus
- Species: A. inyoensis

Binomial name
- Astragalus inyoensis E.Sheld.

= Astragalus inyoensis =

Species of legume

Astragalus inyoensis is a species of milkvetch known by the common name Inyo milkvetch.

It is native to the Great Basin Desert mountains and flats of western Nevada, and the White and Inyo Mountains of eastern California, US.

== Description ==
Astragalus inyoensis is a low, mat-forming perennial herb with slender, crooked gray-green stems growing up to 60 centimeters long. The leaves are a few centimeters long and are made up of several oval scoop-shaped leaflets each a few millimeters in length.

The flowers bloom in May, June, and July. The flowers are White, Pink, or Purple. Its size is around 1/3 of a foot to 2 feet tall.

The inflorescence produces up to 15 pinkish purple flowers each around a centimeter long. The fruit is a hanging legume pod just over a centimeter long which is narrow and curved in shape and leathery in texture.
