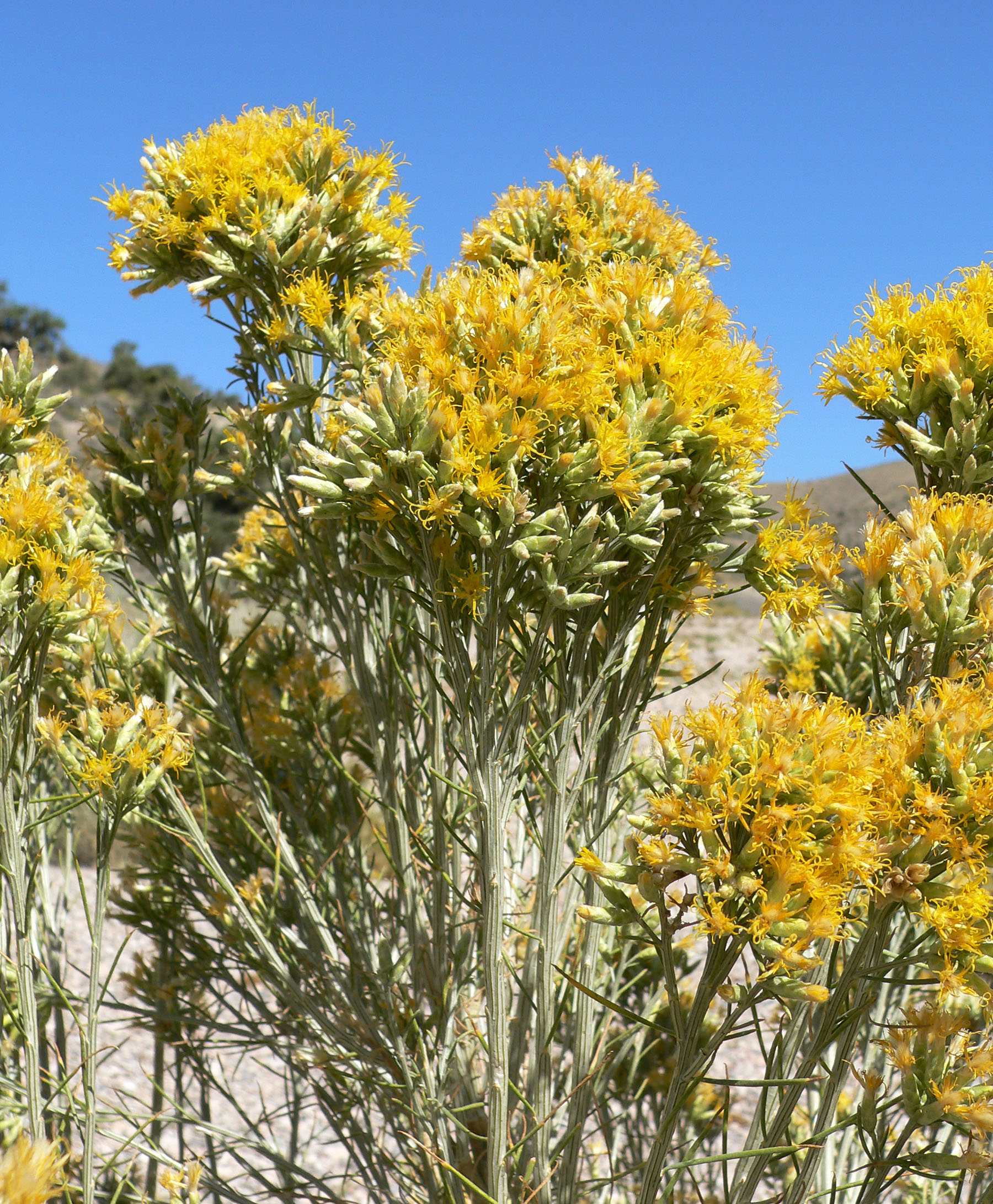

Scientific classification
- Kingdom: Plantae
- Clade: Tracheophytes
- Clade: Angiosperms
- Clade: Eudicots
- Clade: Asterids
- Order: Asterales
- Family: Asteraceae
- Genus: Lepidospartum
- Species: L. latisquamum

Binomial name
- Lepidospartum latisquamum S.Wats.

= Lepidospartum latisquamum =

Species of plant

Lepidospartum latisquamum is a species of flowering shrub in the daisy family known by the common name Nevada broomsage. It is native to the southwestern United States from California to Utah, where it grows in woodland and scrub. This is a broomlike shrub growing ribbed stems upright to form a narrow, erect profile. The ridges of the stem are hairless, while the grooves between them are coated in grayish woolly hairs. The leaves are needlelike to thready, 2 to 3 centimeters long and mostly hairless. The inflorescence is a loose cluster of 3 to 5 flower heads. Each head has a nearly cylindrical base of flat, wide phyllaries. It is discoid, containing about five yellow disc florets and no ray florets. The fruit is a hairy, ridged achene with a pappus of long bristles.
