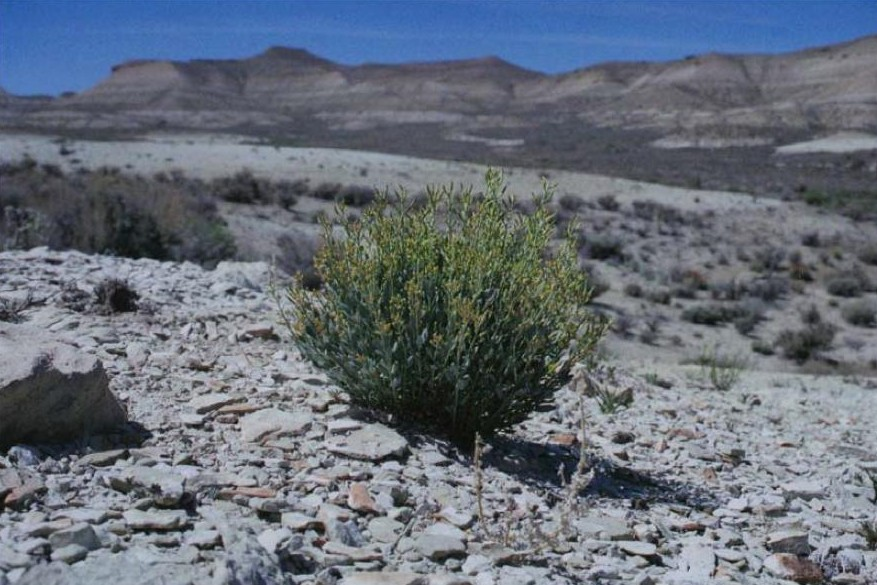
- Hesperidanthus suffrutescens

Scientific classification
- Kingdom: Plantae
- Clade: Tracheophytes
- Clade: Angiosperms
- Clade: Eudicots
- Clade: Rosids
- Order: Brassicales
- Family: Brassicaceae
- Genus: Hesperidanthus; Rydb.

Species
- See text.

Synonyms
- Caulostramina Rollins; Glaucocarpum Rollins; Schoenocrambe Greene

= Hesperidanthus =

Genus of plants

Hesperidanthus is a genus of flowering plant in the family Brassicaceae, native to southwestern and south central United States and Mexico. The genus was established by Per Axel Rydberg in 1907.

== Species ==
As of March 2024, Plants of the World Online accepted five species:

- Hesperidanthus argillaceus (S.L.Welsh & N.D.Atwood) Al-Shehbaz
- Hesperidanthus barnebyi (S.L.Welsh & N.D.Atwood) Al-Shehbaz
- Hesperidanthus jaegeri (Rollins) Al-Shehbaz
- Hesperidanthus linearifolius (A.Gray) Rydb.
- Hesperidanthus suffrutescens (Rollins) Al-Shehbaz
