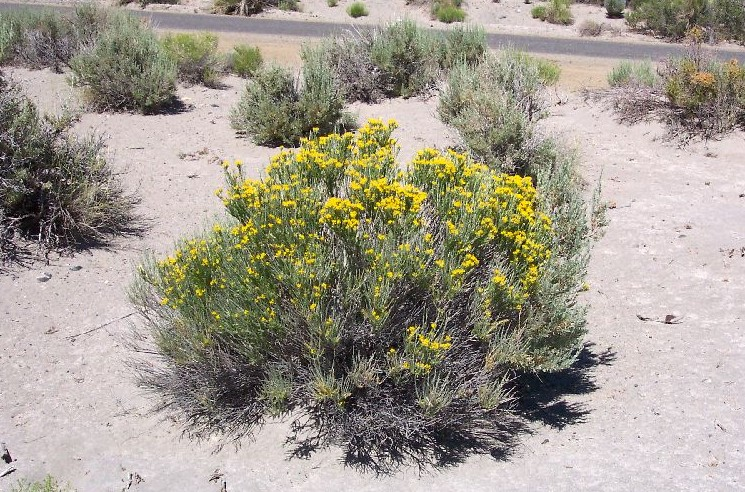

Conservation status
- Secure (NatureServe)

Scientific classification
- Kingdom: Plantae
- Clade: Tracheophytes
- Clade: Angiosperms
- Clade: Eudicots
- Clade: Asterids
- Order: Asterales
- Family: Asteraceae
- Genus: Tetradymia
- Species: T. glabrata

Binomial name
- Tetradymia glabrata Torr. & A.Gray

= Tetradymia glabrata =

Species of flowering plant

Tetradymia glabrata is a species of flowering plant in the aster family known by the common name littleleaf horsebrush.

It is an erect, bushy shrub growing to a maximum height over 1 metre (3 1/2 ft), its stems coated unevenly in white woolly fibers with many bare strips. The narrow, pointed leaves are usually no more than a centimeter long and most occur in clusters along the branches. The inflorescence bears up to seven flower heads which are each enveloped in four woolly phyllaries. Each head contains four yellow cream flowers each around a centimeter long. The fruit is a hairy, ribbed achene with a pappus of bristles.

It is native to the western United States, especially the Great Basin and Mojave Desert. Its habitat includes sagebrush, woodlands, and scrub. It tolerates saline and alkaline soils.

This species is the most toxic of the horsebrushes; it and spineless horsebrush (Tetradymia canescens) commonly cause illness and mortality in sheep due to the presence of furanoeremophilanes and other substances. It is especially toxic when consumed along with the black sagebrush (Artemisia nova).
