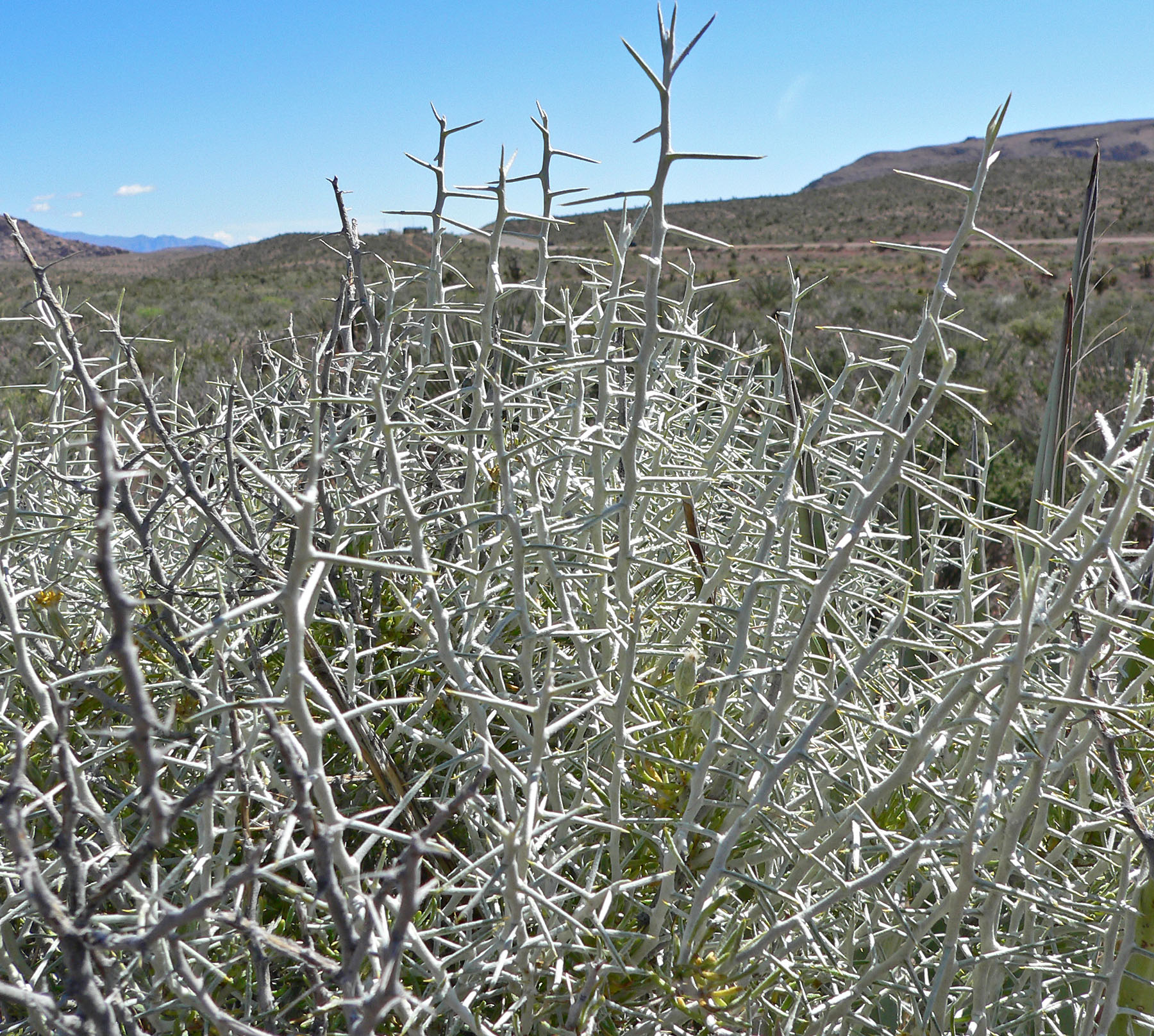

Conservation status
- Apparently Secure (NatureServe)

Scientific classification
- Kingdom: Plantae
- Clade: Tracheophytes
- Clade: Angiosperms
- Clade: Eudicots
- Clade: Asterids
- Order: Asterales
- Family: Asteraceae
- Genus: Tetradymia
- Species: T. axillaris

Binomial name
- Tetradymia axillaris A. Nels.

= Tetradymia axillaris =

Species of flowering plant

Tetradymia axillaris is a flowering plant in the daisy family known by the common names longspine horsebrush and cottonthorn. This is a plant of the sagebrush and desert plant communities of the southwestern United States.

The plant forms a sprawling thicket and is very spiny. The green leaves dry and their tissues fall away, leaving the veins as hard, sharp spines. When in foliage the bush has green, hairy stems and bears yellow daisylike flowerheads in the axils, or angles, of the newest branches. The fruits are released in masses of cottony seed.

There are two varieties of the species, var. axillaris and var. longispina. They grow together in some areas and there their characteristics may intergrade.

The sharp spines were used as tattooing needles by the Kawaiisu Native Americans of California.
