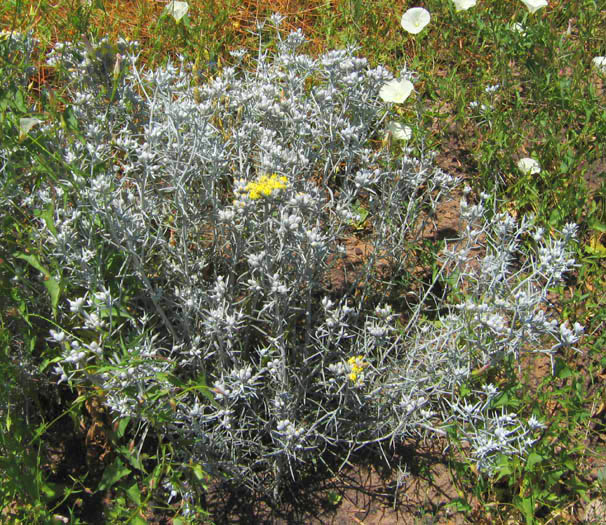

Scientific classification
- Kingdom: Plantae
- Clade: Tracheophytes
- Clade: Angiosperms
- Clade: Eudicots
- Clade: Asterids
- Order: Asterales
- Family: Asteraceae
- Genus: Tetradymia
- Species: T. comosa

Binomial name
- Tetradymia comosa A.Gray

= Tetradymia comosa =

Species of flowering plant

Tetradymia comosa is a species of flowering plant in the aster family, known by the common name hairy horsebrush.

== Distribution ==
The plant is native to the Transverse Ranges and Peninsular Ranges in Southern California and northern Baja California. It grows in local chaparral and woodlands habitats, such as coastal sage scrub and montane chaparral and woodlands.

== Description ==
Tetradymia comosa is a whitish woolly shrub growing 30 centimetres (12 in) to over 1 metre (3.3 ft) tall. The leaves are lance-shaped and up to 6 centimeters long, becoming rigid as they age, sometimes with their tips hardening to spines.

The inflorescence bears three to six flower heads which are each enveloped in five or six thick phyllaries coated in white woolly hairs. Each head contains five to nine yellow or brownish flowers each around a centimeter long.

The fruit is a small, hairy achene.
