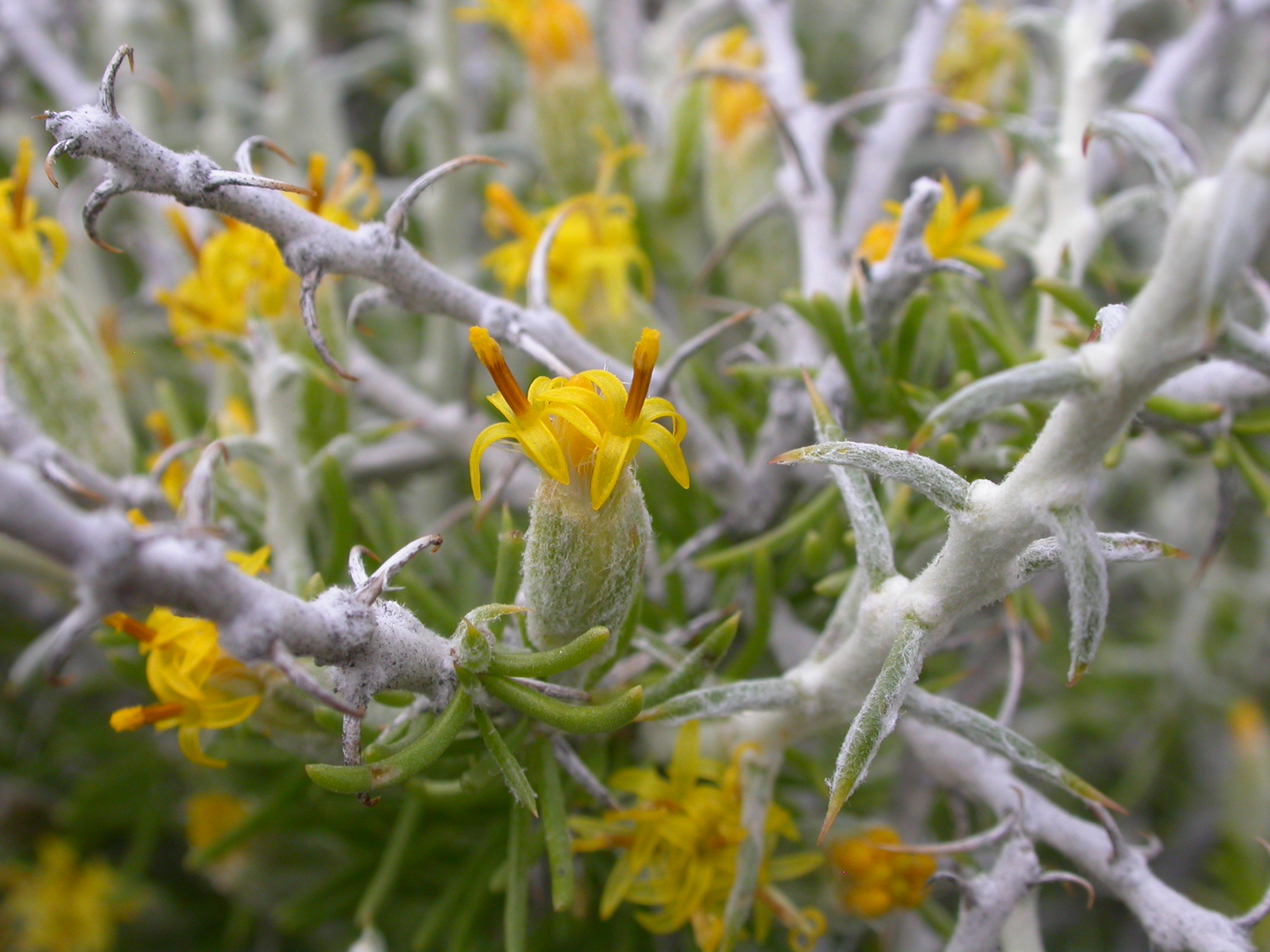

Conservation status
- Secure (NatureServe)

Scientific classification
- Kingdom: Plantae
- Clade: Tracheophytes
- Clade: Angiosperms
- Clade: Eudicots
- Clade: Asterids
- Order: Asterales
- Family: Asteraceae
- Genus: Tetradymia
- Species: T. spinosa

Binomial name
- Tetradymia spinosa Hook. & Arn.

= Tetradymia spinosa =

Species of flowering plant

Tetradymia spinosa is a species of flowering plant in the aster family known by the common name shortspine horsebrush. It is native to the western United States, especially the basins and plateaus west of the Rocky Mountains. It grows in sagebrush, woodlands, and scrub habitat, often among shadscale in alkaline areas such as playas. It is a bushy shrub with many branches coated in woolly white fibers and growing to a maximum height around a meter. The leaves are narrow, curving, and hooklike, hardening into sharp spines up to 2.5 centimeters long. The inflorescence bears one or two flower heads which are each enveloped in four to six woolly phyllaries. Each head contains up to 8 tubular yellow disc flowers up to 1 cm long. The fruit is a densely hairy achene which may be nearly 2 cm long, including its pappus of long bristles.

The plant is extremely toxic, although it is unpalatable and unlikely to be eaten. Consumption causes liver damage and extreme light sensitivity, which in combination may be deadly. The latter effect is caused by a pigment entering the superficial circulatory system, producing a sunburn-like effect as well as swelling around the head in light-colored animals, particularly sheep.
