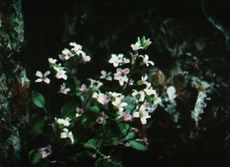

Scientific classification
- Kingdom: Plantae
- Clade: Tracheophytes
- Clade: Angiosperms
- Clade: Eudicots
- Clade: Rosids
- Order: Brassicales
- Family: Brassicaceae
- Genus: Hesperidanthus
- Species: H. jaegeri

Binomial name
- Hesperidanthus jaegeri (Rollins) Al-Shehbaz

Synonyms
- Caulostramina jaegeri (Rollins) Rollins; Thelypodium jaegeri Rollins

= Hesperidanthus jaegeri =

Genus of flowering plants

Hesperidanthus jaegeri is a species of flowering plant in the family Brassicaceae. It was first described as Thelypodium jaegeri. It has also been placed as the only species, Caulostramina jaegeri, in the monotypic genus Caulostramina. It is known by the English name cliffdweller.

Hesperidanthus jaegeri is a hardy woody perennial herb bearing hairless green leaves and white to pale purple flowers with spoon-shaped, purple-streaked petals. The seeds are borne in cylindrical fruits. It is a rare plant endemic to Inyo County, California, where it is found only in the White and Inyo Mountains. This plant grows on rocky mountainsides and sprouts from cliffs.
