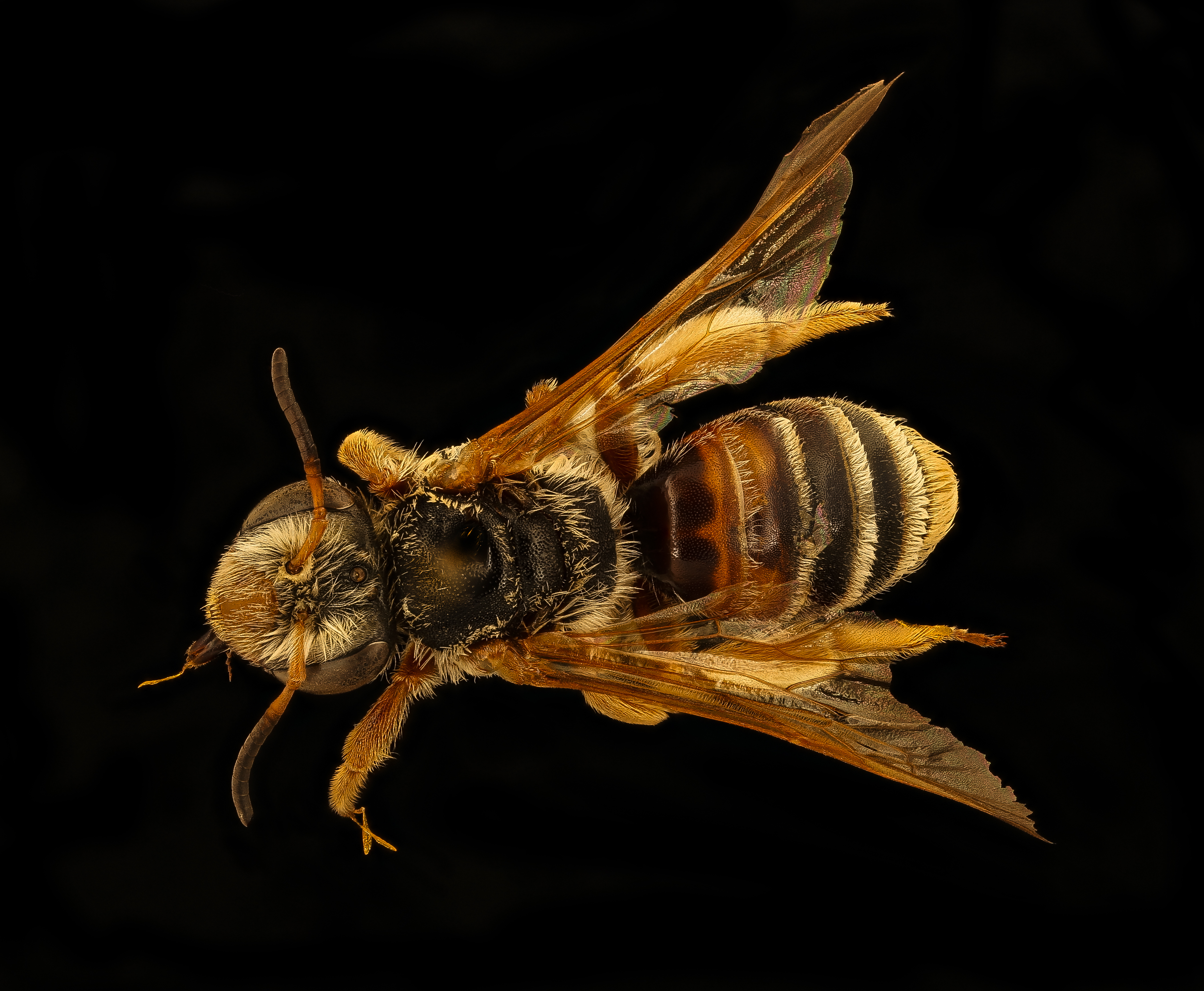

Scientific classification
- Kingdom: Animalia
- Phylum: Arthropoda
- Class: Insecta
- Order: Hymenoptera
- Family: Andrenidae
- Genus: Andrena
- Species: A. prunorum

Binomial name
- Andrena prunorum Cockerell, 1896

= Andrena prunorum =

Species of bee

Andrena prunorum, otherwise known as the purple miner bee, is a species of solitary bees in the family Andrenidae. It is commonly found in the continental United States as well as much of North and Central America. Andrena prunorum is a spring-flying, ground-nesting bee that serves as a ubiquitous generalist in ecological settings. Both males and females live as prepupae in the winter in which they mate, and the females seek new sites for ground burrows. From there, they construct small cells surrounding a ball of pollen combined with nectar to nourish a laid egg before each cell is sealed, and the cycle begins anew. A. prunorum generally prefer the pollen derived from Rosaceae plants but will pollinate fruit trees if given the opportunity.

== Geography ==
=== Habitat ===
A. prunorum is commonly found in much of North and Central America. The Andrenidae family was found to be the second-most represented in British Columbia. This is compounded by the finding that about 70% of the solitary bee species in eastern Canada nest in the ground. However, these findings may be unreliable as Andrena is not readily identifiable, so the isolation of A. prunorum specifically has been a vexing challenge for researchers. They tend to inhabit grasslands containing vernal pools.

== Biology ==
=== Life Cycle and Behavior ===
A. prunorum is a solitary bee species in which every female is fertile and inhabits a nest constructed by herself which differs from social bee species in the sense that there is no division of labor since there are no designated queen and worker bees for the species.

Typically small in size, they often can be mistaken for a fly if not observed closely. Solitary bees like A. prunorum tend to emerge in the spring when their host flowers are blooming. After mating, the females dig nests that begin with tunnels going straight into the ground for a few inches. From there, a side tunnel is dug which ends in a brood chamber about 1 cm wide and 2 cm tall. After coating the chamber with a waxy substance, the female bee begins to collect pollen and nectar which are made into a ball about 6–8 mm across. A single egg gets deposited, and the chamber gets sealed up and another brood chamber gets constructed with a single female capable of digging 8-10 chambers. The egg hatches, and the larva proceeds to consume the pollen ball. In the autumn the larva molts into an adult and spends the winter resting in its chamber. It emerges the following spring, and the cycle repeats.

==== Male Roles ====
Males, otherwise known as drones, are haploid and have shorter lifespans than females. Their primary purpose is to fertilize a receptive female, and they die immediately after mating. They have been observed patrolling cultivated fruit trees just before and after bloom.

==== Female Roles ====
Females live much longer lifespans from three to five years and display more complex behavior in maintenance and mating patterns. To build nests, females display the ability to conceal burrows within vegetation while remaining a consistent distance apart from neighboring bees. In locating their nests, they can perform orientation flights in a rough figure-eight pattern. Females produce neither honey nor beeswax but pollen and nectar are collected to feed their young.

=== Subspecies ===
- Andrena prunorum Cockerell
- Andrena prunorum sinaloa Viereck
- Andrena prunorum vicina Smith
- Andrena milwaukeensis
- Andrena thaspii
- Andrena schuhi
- Andrena vicinoides
- Andrena sp. A
