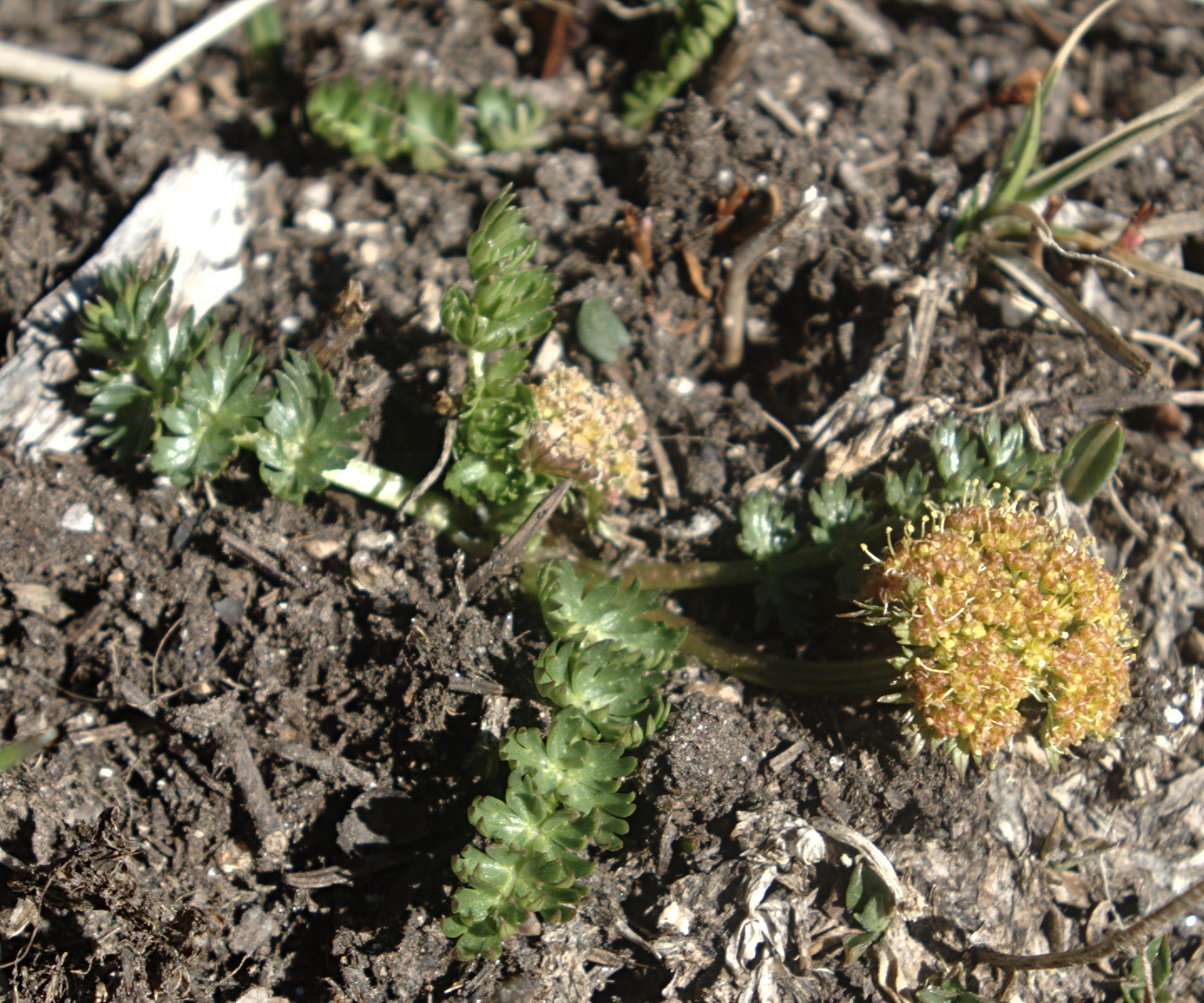
- Podistera eastwoodiae

Scientific classification
- Kingdom: Plantae
- Clade: Tracheophytes
- Clade: Angiosperms
- Clade: Eudicots
- Clade: Asterids
- Order: Apiales
- Family: Apiaceae
- Subfamily: Apioideae
- Tribe: Selineae
- Genus: Podistera; S.Watson

Species
- 4, see text.

= Podistera =

Genus of plants

Podistera is a genus of flowering plants in the carrot family. The four species are native to western North America, where they grow in high mountains and northern latitudes. They are compact, mat-forming perennial herbs with a low, clumpy habit common among plants growing in harsh, exposed, cold, dry habitat.

Species:

- Podistera eastwoodiae - Eastwood's podistera (Colorado, Utah, New Mexico)
- Podistera macounii - Macoun's woodroot (Alaska, Yukon, Northwest Territories)
- Podistera nevadensis - Sierra podistera (California)
- Podistera yukonensis - Yukon podistera (Alaska, Yukon)
