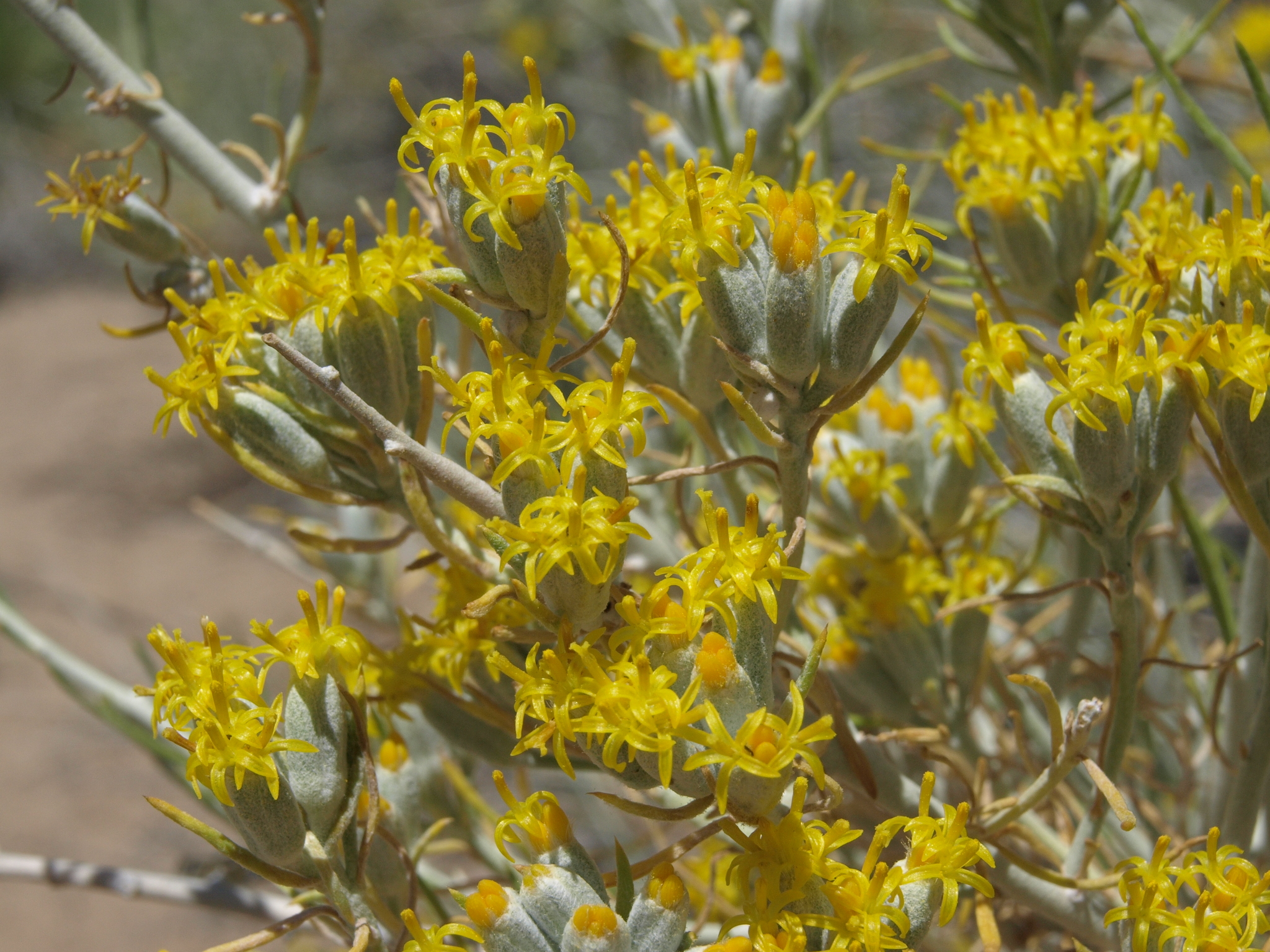

Scientific classification
- Kingdom: Plantae
- Clade: Tracheophytes
- Clade: Angiosperms
- Clade: Eudicots
- Clade: Asterids
- Order: Asterales
- Family: Asteraceae
- Genus: Tetradymia
- Species: T. tetrameres

Binomial name
- Tetradymia tetrameres (S.F.Blake) Strother

= Tetradymia tetrameres =

Species of flowering plant

Tetradymia tetrameres is a species of flowering plant in the aster family known by the common name fourpart horsebrush and dune horsebrush. It is native to the Great Basin, where it occurs in western Nevada and just over the border in Mono County, California. It is a plant of dry scrub and sand dunes. It is a bushy, woolly shrub with many erect, spineless branches. It is the largest of the horsebrushes, growing up to two meters in height. The soft, woolly leaves are narrow and threadlike, growing up to 4 centimeters long. Shorter leaves occur in clusters around the primary leaves. The inflorescence bears 4 to 6 flower heads which are each enveloped in four or five woolly phyllaries. Each head contains up to four or five light yellow flowers each around a centimeter long. The fruit is a hairy achene which may be up to a centimeter long, including its pappus of long bristles.
