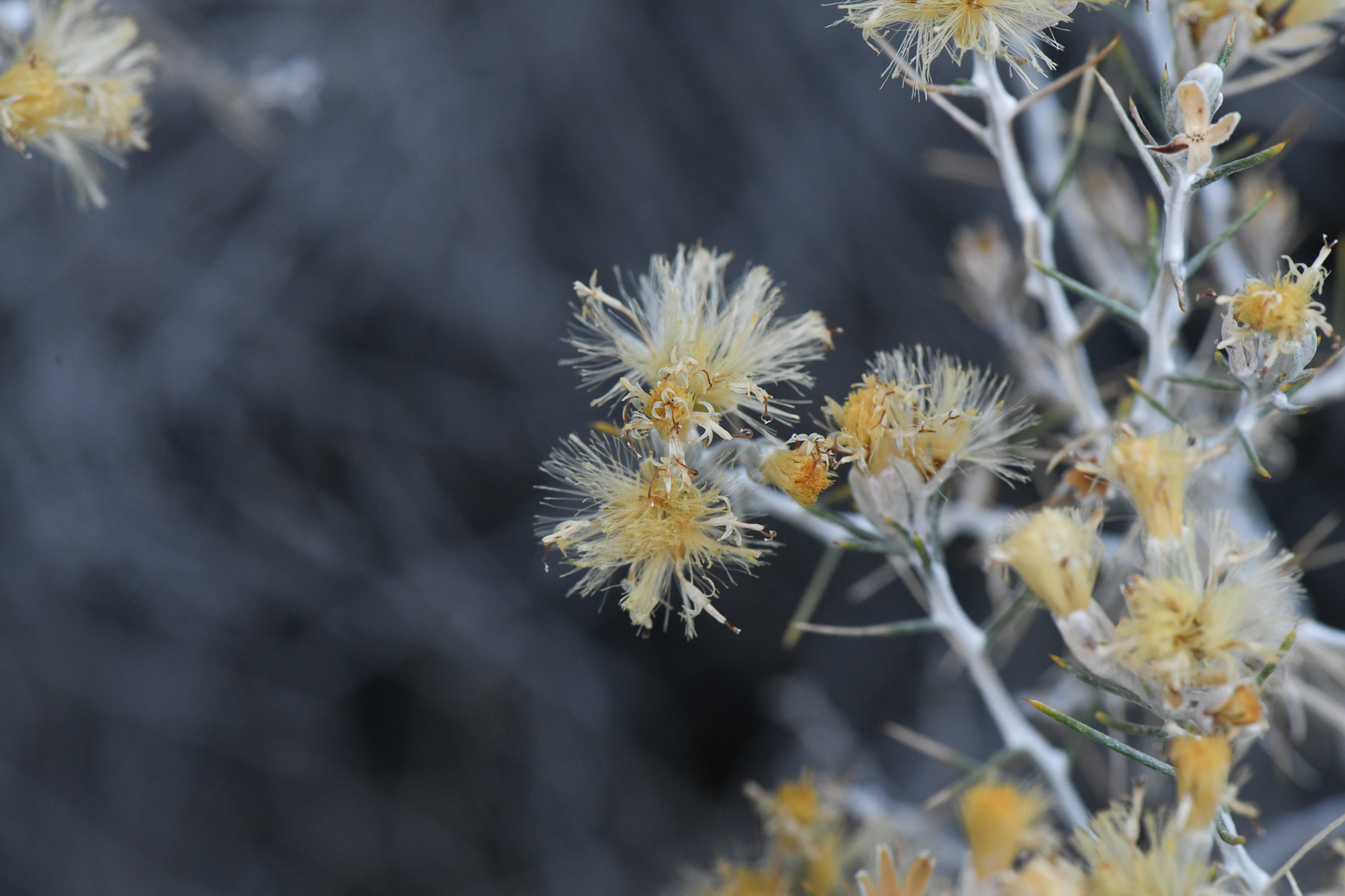

Scientific classification
- Kingdom: Plantae
- Clade: Tracheophytes
- Clade: Angiosperms
- Clade: Eudicots
- Clade: Asterids
- Order: Asterales
- Family: Asteraceae
- Genus: Tetradymia
- Species: T. argyraea

Binomial name
- Tetradymia argyraea Munz & Roos

= Tetradymia argyraea =

Species of flowering plant

Tetradymia argyraea is a species of flowering plant in the aster family known by the common names striped cottonthorn and striped horsebrush. It is native to the desert mountains of the southwestern United States, particularly of California, Nevada, and Arizona, where it grows in desert woodland habitat. It is a woolly, spiny shrub growing one half to nearly two meters in maximum height. The erect stems are white-woolly except for bare stripes at intervals. The leaves are linear in shape and harden as they age, becoming spiny. The larger leaves are woolly and there are clusters of smaller, threadlike leaves which may be hairless. The inflorescence bears two to five flower heads which are each enveloped in five thick phyllaries coated in white woolly hairs. Each head contains five pale yellow flowers each around a centimeter long. Flowers are produced in summer, as late as September. The fruit is an achene a few millimeters long tipped with a pappus of bristles.
