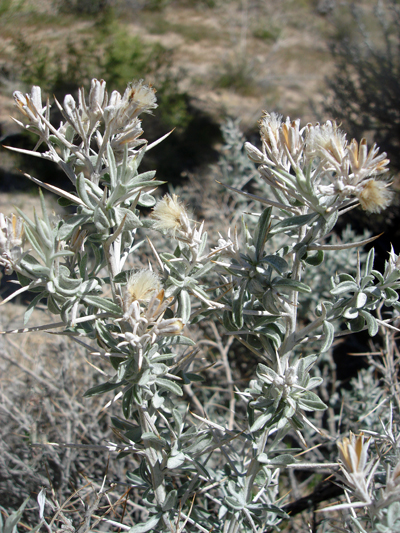

Conservation status
- Apparently Secure (NatureServe)

Scientific classification
- Kingdom: Plantae
- Clade: Tracheophytes
- Clade: Angiosperms
- Clade: Eudicots
- Clade: Asterids
- Order: Asterales
- Family: Asteraceae
- Genus: Tetradymia
- Species: T. stenolepis

Binomial name
- Tetradymia stenolepis Greene

= Tetradymia stenolepis =

Species of flowering plant

Tetradymia stenolepis is a species of flowering plant in the aster family known by the common name Mojave cottonthorn. It is native to the deserts around the intersection of Arizona, Nevada, and eastern California, where it grows in woodland and scrub habitat on sandy and gravelly substrates. It is a bushy shrub with many branches coated in woolly white fibers and growing to a maximum height just over a meter. The narrow leaves are 2 or 3 centimeters long and harden into straight, sharp spines. Clusters of woolly leaves grow near the spines. The inflorescence bears up to 7 flower heads which are each enveloped in four or five woolly phyllaries. Each head contains up to four or five tubular yellow flowers each around a centimeter long. The fruit is a hairy achene which may be nearly 2 centimeters long, including its pappus of long bristles.
