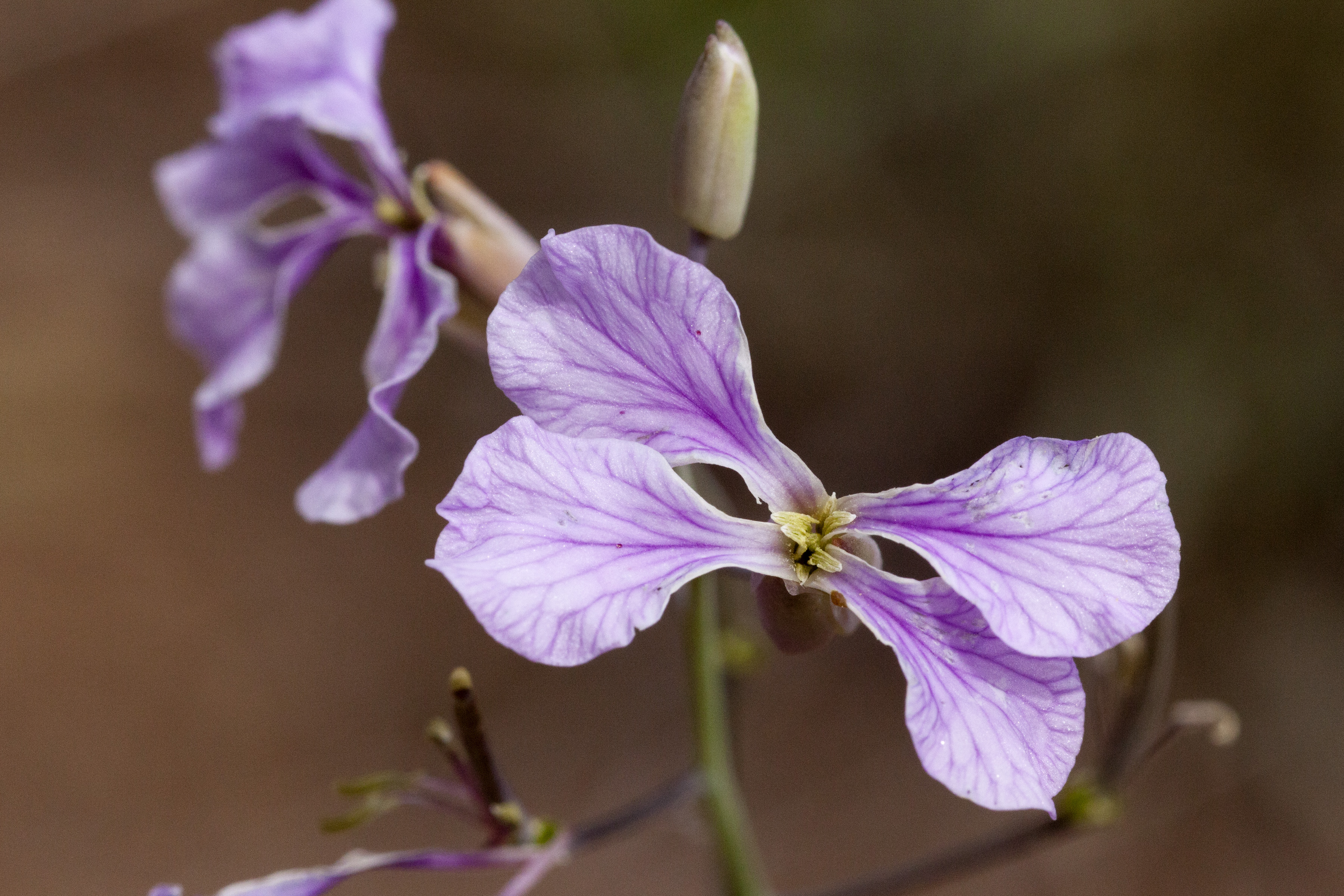

Conservation status
- Apparently Secure (NatureServe)

Scientific classification
- Kingdom: Plantae
- Clade: Tracheophytes
- Clade: Angiosperms
- Clade: Eudicots
- Clade: Rosids
- Order: Brassicales
- Family: Brassicaceae
- Genus: Hesperidanthus
- Species: H. linearifolius

Binomial name
- Hesperidanthus linearifolius (A.Gray) Rydb.

Synonyms
- List: Pachypodium linearifolium (A.Gray) A.Gray; Schoenocrambe linearifolia (A.Gray) Rollins; Sisymbrium linearifolium (A.Gray) Payson; Sisymbrium stenophyllus Rollins; Thelypodiopsis linearifolia (A.Gray) Al-Shehbaz; Thelypodium linearifolium (A.Gray) S. Watson

= Hesperidanthus linearifolius =

Species of flowering plant

Hesperidanthus linearifolius, syn. Schoenocrambe linearifolia, is a species of flowering plant in the mustard family, known by the common names slimleaf plainsmustard, slimleaf purple mustard, and mountain mustard. It can be found in the western United States in New Mexico, Arizona, Colorado, and west Texas, as well as in northern Mexico.

== Description ==
Hesperidanthus linearifolius is a perennial herb that produces a raceme of purple flowers, each with four spoon-shaped petals. This tall, slender plant can grow to approximately 4 feet (1.2 meters) tall. It has one or more erect stems that frequently branch near the top.

Before blooming, plants in their first year have a basal rosette of oblanceolate leaves 5–10 centimeters (2.0–3.9 inches) in length. Leaves on the stem are alternate, hairless, short-petiolate and have smooth margins and pointed tips. Leaves lower on the stem are oblanceolate, while leaves higher on the stem are more linear, at about 3.5–5 centimeters (1.4–2.0 inches) in length and 6 millimeters (1/4 inch) in width.

The fruit is a long, slender capsule (silique) that is usually straight and roughly 4–9 centimeters (1.6–3.5 inches) long.

== Ecology ==
This mustard grows at elevations of 700–3,100 meters (2,300–10,200 ft). It grows in dry climates, often in sandy or rocky soils. It occurs on disturbed sites such as roadsides, and in desert shrub, pinyon-juniper, and montane conifer forest plant communities. It flowers between mid-spring and late fall.

== Uses ==
Infusions of the leaves have been used as a ceremonial eyewash and as a treatment for sore gums by the Ramah Navajo.
