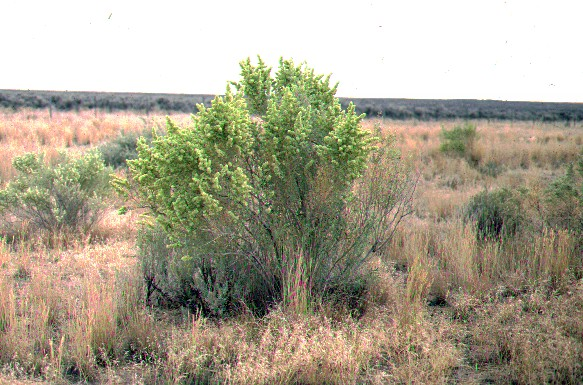

Conservation status
- Secure (NatureServe)

Scientific classification
- Kingdom: Plantae
- Clade: Tracheophytes
- Clade: Angiosperms
- Clade: Eudicots
- Order: Caryophyllales
- Family: Amaranthaceae
- Genus: Atriplex
- Species: A. canescens

Binomial name
- Atriplex canescens (Pursh) Nutt.

= Atriplex canescens =

Species of flowering plant

Atriplex canescens (or chamiso, chamiza, four-wing saltbush) is a species of evergreen shrub in the family Amaranthaceae (subfamily Chenopodioideae) native to the western and midwestern United States.

== Description ==
Atriplex canescens has a highly variable form, and readily hybridizes with several other species in the genus Atriplex. The degree of polyploidy also results in variations in form. Its height can vary from 1 foot to 10 feet, but 2 to 4 feet is most common. The leaves are thin and 0.5 to 2 inches long.

It is most readily identified by the fruits, which have four wings at roughly 90 degree angles and are densely packed on long stems.

This species blooms from April to October.

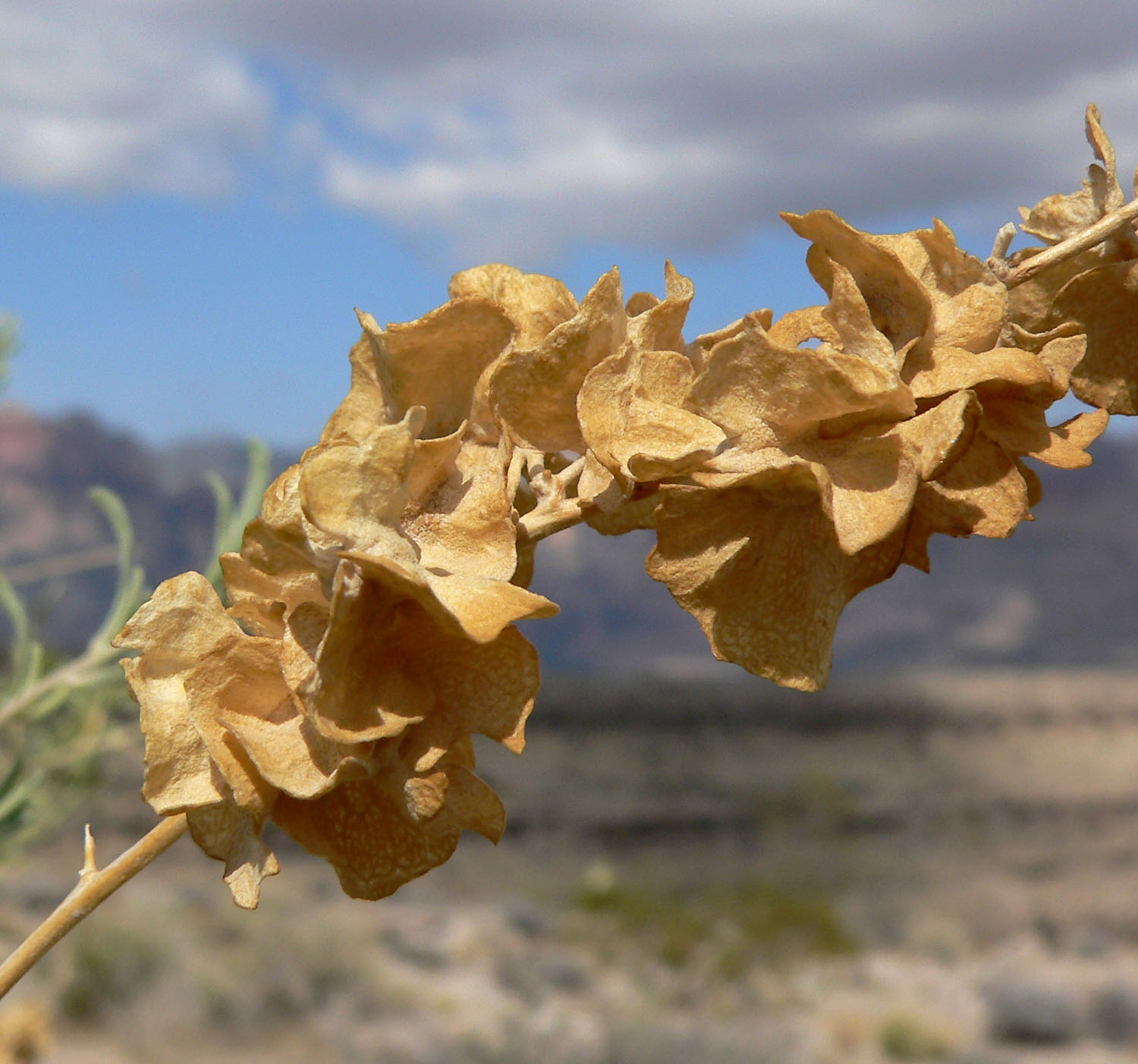
Dried fruits on a stem, in the desert west of Las Vegas, Nevada

== Habitat ==
Fourwing saltbush is most common in early succession areas such as disturbed sites and active sand dunes. It is also found in more mature successions dominated by sagebrush—Artemisia tridentata and shadscale.

== Uses ==
Among the Zuni people, an infusion of dried root and blossoms or a poultice of blossoms is used for ant bites. Twigs are also attached to prayer plumes and sacrificed to the cottontail rabbit to ensure good hunting. The Native American Hopi Indians prefer the ashes of four-wing saltbush for the nixtamalization of maize (the first step in the process of creating tortillas and pinole, by which the pericarp of Indian corn is removed before parching and grinding). Oftentimes the four-wing saltbush was used instead of slaked lime (hydrate lime/slaked powder lime). Four-wing saltbush is also a common marker that archaeologists can use to locate ancient Pueblo ruins, which may indicate that the small branches of this bush were burned for their alkaline ashes to nixtamalize maize by Native peoples throughout the South-Western United States.
