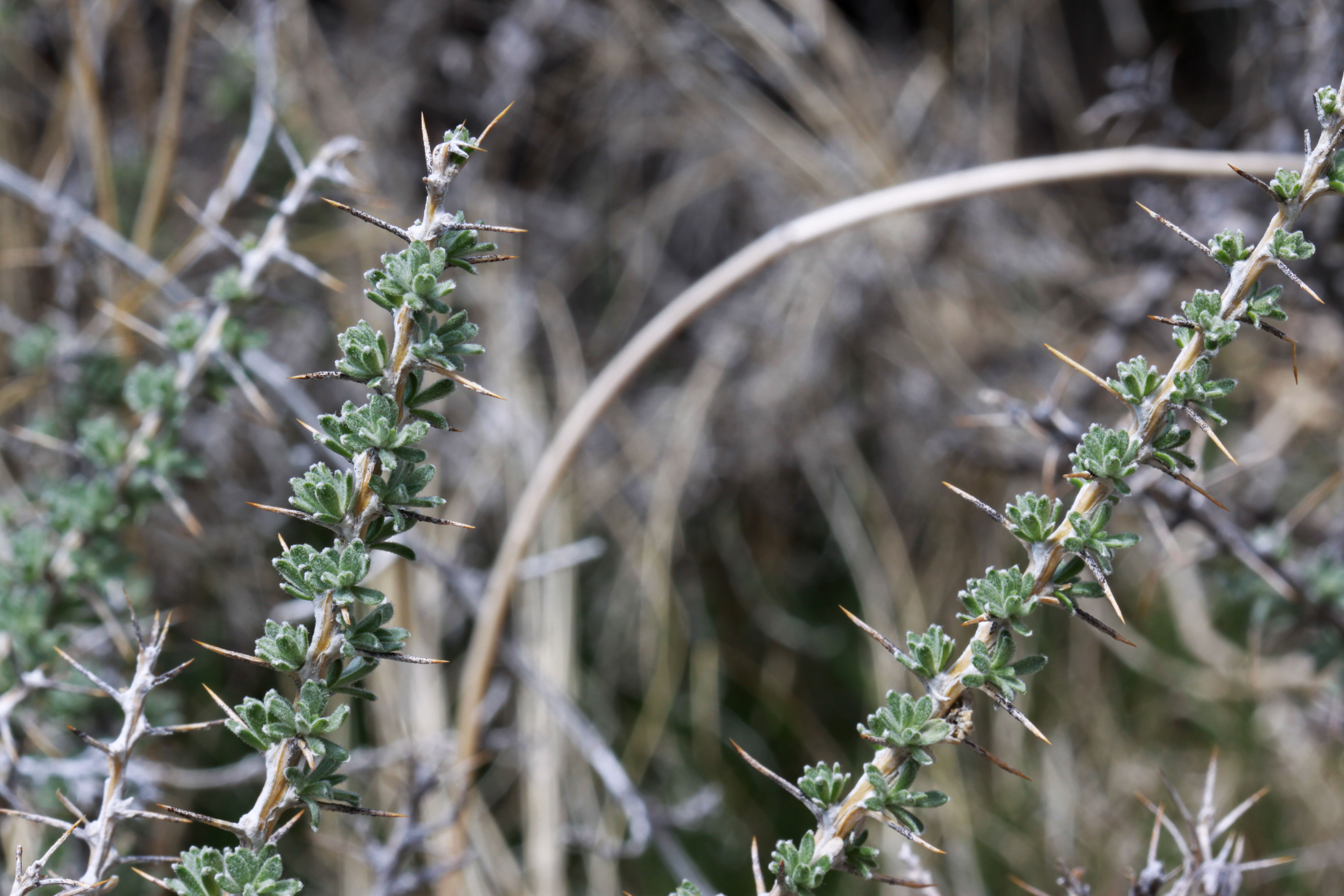

Conservation status
- Vulnerable (NatureServe)

Scientific classification
- Kingdom: Plantae
- Clade: Tracheophytes
- Clade: Angiosperms
- Clade: Eudicots
- Clade: Asterids
- Order: Asterales
- Family: Asteraceae
- Genus: Tetradymia
- Species: T. nuttallii

Binomial name
- Tetradymia nuttallii Torr. & A.Gray

= Tetradymia nuttallii =

Species of flowering plant

Tetradymia nuttallii is a species of flowering plant in the aster family known by the common name Nuttall's horsebrush. It is native to the western United States, where it occurs in Nevada, Utah, Wyoming, and Colorado.

This shrub or subshrub has a stiff, branching network of stems reaching up to 1.2 meters in maximum height. Like other Tetradymia, this species has two types of leaves. The larger, primary leaves become spines which may be over 2 centimeters in length. The inflorescence is made up of a few flower heads, each of which contains four bright yellow flowers. The fruit is well over a centimeter long, including its large pappus. The leaves fall off the plant during dry times. Also when it is dry the plant may not flower, or if it does, it does not produce fruits.

This plant grows in habitat dominated by shadscale and black greasewood, as well as sagebrush and pinyon-juniper woodland. It grows in dry and sometimes rocky soils.
