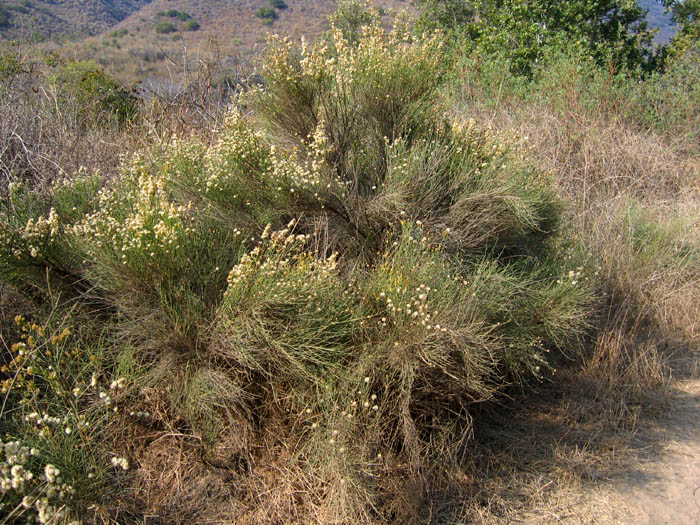

Scientific classification
- Kingdom: Plantae
- Clade: Embryophytes
- Clade: Tracheophytes
- Clade: Spermatophytes
- Clade: Angiosperms
- Clade: Eudicots
- Clade: Asterids
- Order: Asterales
- Family: Asteraceae
- Genus: Lepidospartum
- Species: L. squamatum

Binomial name
- Lepidospartum squamatum A.Gray

= Lepidospartum squamatum =

Species of shrub

Lepidospartum squamatum is a species of flowering shrub in the daisy family known by the common names California broomsage and scale broom.

== Distribution ==
Lepidospartum squamatum is native to the mountains, valleys, and deserts of central and southern California, and Baja California. It grows in sandy, gravelly soils in a number of habitat types, especially dry alluvial habitat such as arroyos. It is considered an indicator species for the alluvial scrub habitat type in this region. In Griffith Park, Los Angeles, the species is found growing along fence lines, where they grow protected from disturbance like mowing; they likely descend from historical populations which would have grown along the historical Los Angeles River wash. In the Piute Mountains of Kern County, California, it is a common shrub found in desert scrub and sandy flats. It is also commonly found in neighboring Arizona.

== Description ==
Lepidospartum squamatum is a large shrub often exceeding two meters in height which takes a spreading, rounded form, its branches are coated in woolly fibers and stubby leaves no more than 3 millimeters long. These drought adaptations support flowering during hot summers when many plants are dormant, making it an important resource for pollinators.

The inflorescence is a single flower head or small cluster of up to 5 heads at the ends of branches. The heads are discoid, bearing many yellow tubular disc florets and no ray florets. The fruit is a narrow achene a few millimeters long with a dull white to light brown pappus on top. While in bloom, scale broom will attract a wide variety of pollinators, including bees, butterflies, moths, and tarantula hawk wasps.

As the fruits mature and the flower parts fall away the inflorescence takes on a cottony look due to all the pappi.

== Ethnobotany ==
According to Tübatulabal informant Steban Miranda in an 1938 ethnography of Tübatulabal people, L. squamatum was among 86 species of plants considered the plants for which no economic, medicinal use, or names were reported and were referred to as weeds, "mašil." The Kawaiiswu do had a name for it, pašivapi, but their use of the plant is not recorded. Some indigenous groups used the branches to make brooms.
