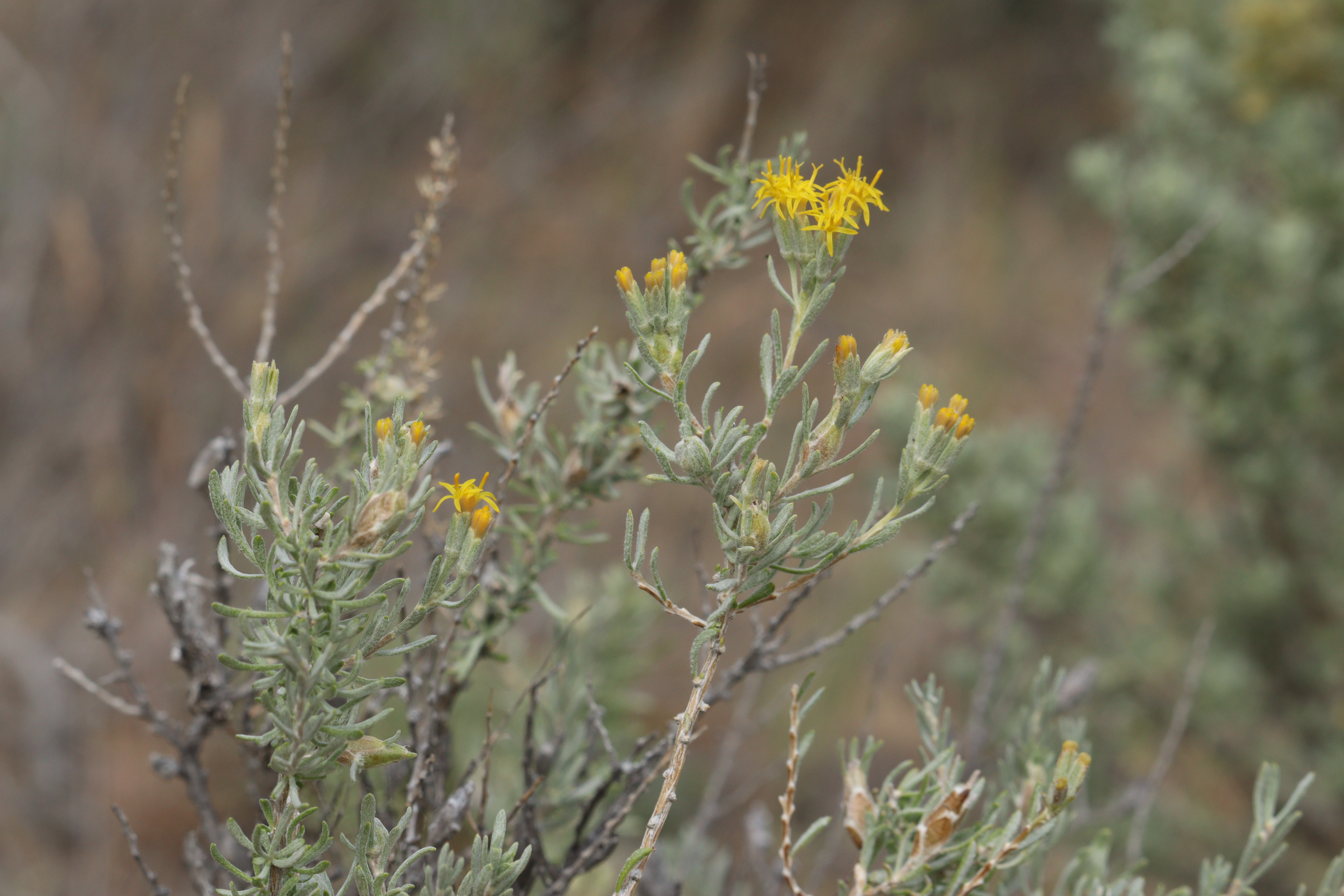

Conservation status
- Secure (NatureServe)

Scientific classification
- Kingdom: Plantae
- Clade: Tracheophytes
- Clade: Angiosperms
- Clade: Eudicots
- Clade: Asterids
- Order: Asterales
- Family: Asteraceae
- Genus: Tetradymia
- Species: T. canescens

Binomial name
- Tetradymia canescens DC.

= Tetradymia canescens =

Species of flowering plant

Tetradymia argyraea is a species of flowering plant in the aster family known by the common names spineless horsebrush and gray horsebrush. It is native to western North America.

== Distribution ==
The range of Tetradymia argyraea is primarily east of the Cascade Range and Sierra Nevada of British Columbia to California. It extends eastward to southwest Montana, Wyoming, western Colorado and northwest New Mexico, where it grows in sagebrush scrub, woodlands, forest, scrubby open plains, and other habitat. It occupies a large range of elevations from near sea level to 3,400 m (11,000 ft) but favors the range of 1,500–2,700 metres (5,000–9,000 ft).

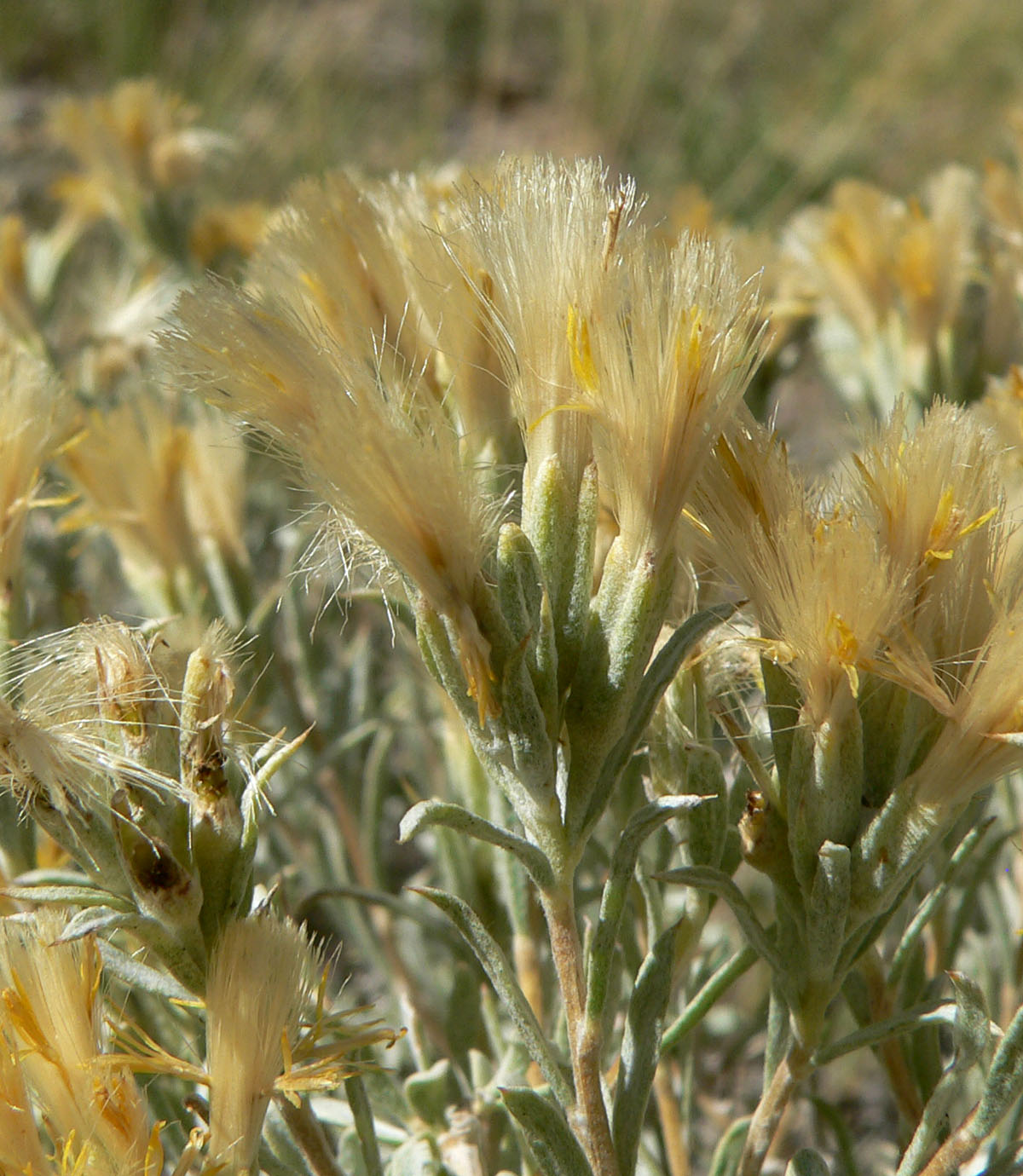
The fruit is a 2.5–5 mm (0.1–0.2 in) achene with a bristly pappus 6–11 mm (0.2–0.4 in) long.

== Description ==
It is a bushy shrub 10–80 cm (4–31 in) tall with multibranched woody or semi-woody stems that grow from taproots. It is coated in woolly fibers with hairless strips at intervals along the branches. It has no spines. The lance-shaped leaves are no more than 4 cm (1.6 in) long and woolly or silver-haired in texture. Longer-lived leaves are alternately arranged along the stem and smaller, shorter-lived leaves occur in clusters near the axils of the primary leaves. The inflorescence bears usually three to six flower heads which are each enveloped in four thick phyllaries coated in white woolly hairs. Each head contains four tubular flowers in shades of pale to bright yellow, each 7–15 mm (0.3–0.6 in) long. Flowers are produced in May through October. The fruit is an achene 7–15 mm (0.3–0.6 in) long including its long pappus of bristles.

The shrub is wildfire-resistant, resprouting vigorously and increasing in herbage and seed production in seasons following a fire. Fire suppression efforts decrease the abundance of the shrub and frequent burns increase it.

The shrub is toxic to sheep, causing photosensitivity, bad wool quality, abortion, and death due to the presence of furanoeremophilanes. It causes a swelling of the head known as bighead disease.

Native American groups used this plant for a number of medicinal purposes, including protection from ghosts and witches.
