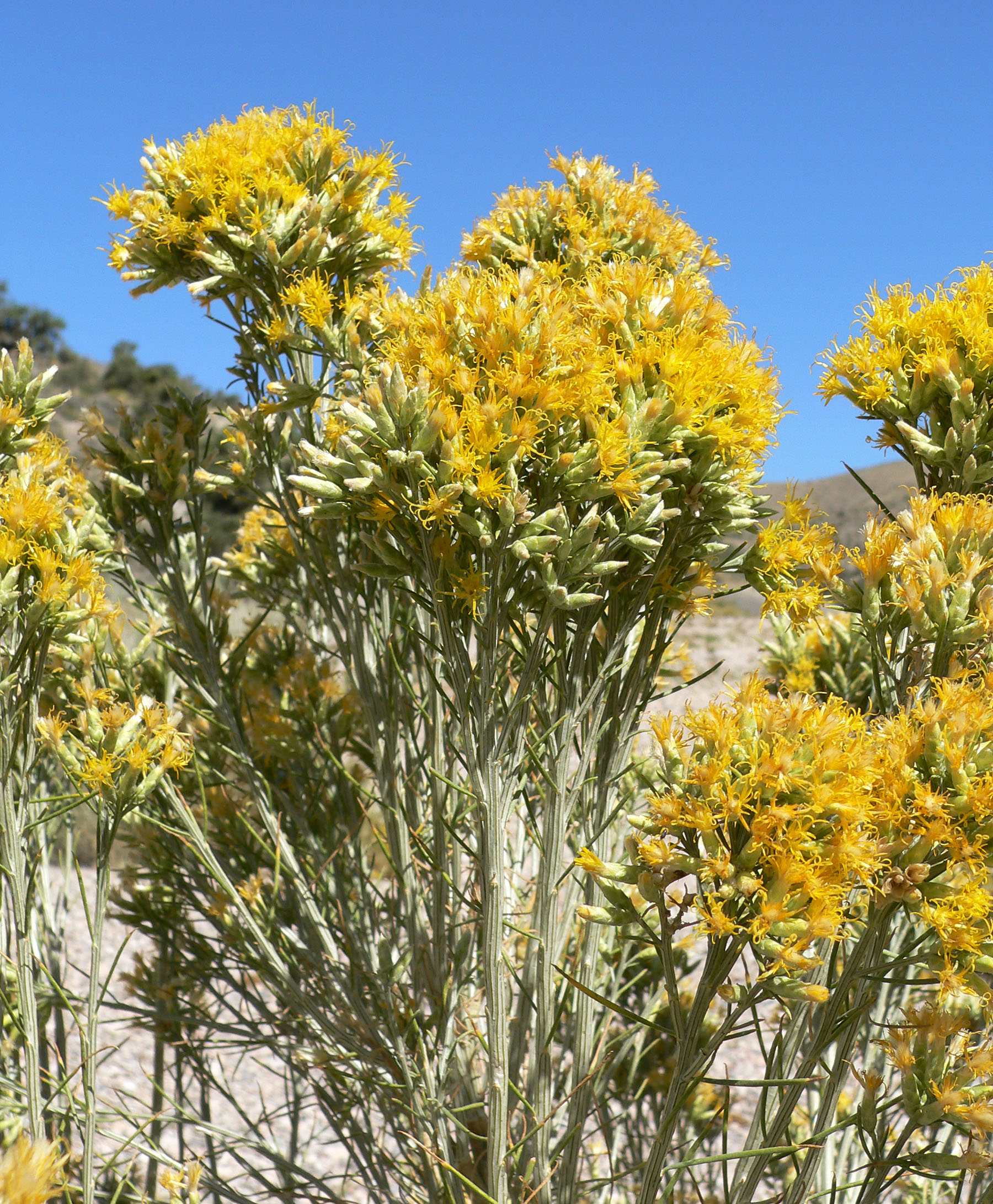
- Lepidospartum latisquamum
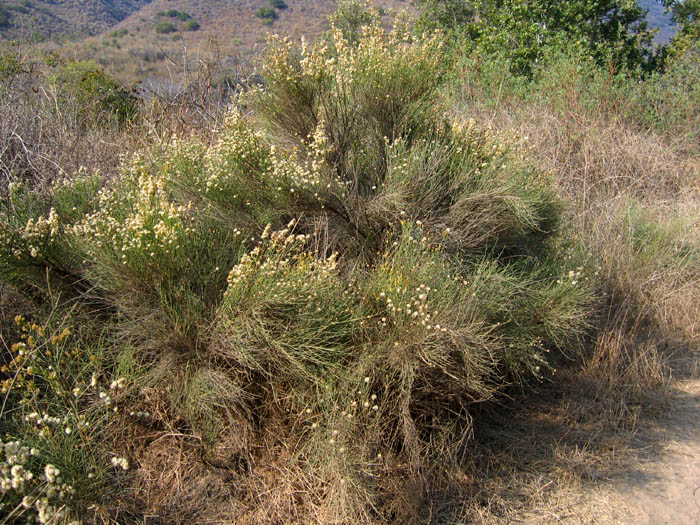
- Lepidospartum squamatum

Scientific classification
- Kingdom: Plantae
- Clade: Tracheophytes
- Clade: Angiosperms
- Clade: Eudicots
- Clade: Asterids
- Order: Asterales
- Family: Asteraceae
- Subfamily: Asteroideae
- Tribe: Senecioneae
- Genus: Lepidospartum; A.Gray

Synonyms
- Tetradymia sect. Lepidosparton A.Gray

= Lepidospartum =

Genus of shrubs

Lepidospartum is a genus of North American desert shrubs in the daisy family. They are known commonly as broomsages or scalebrooms. These are tall, woody shrubs with stiff twiggy branches that resemble brooms. They are native to the southwestern United States and far northern Mexico. These shrub have thin, narrow, needlelike or scalelike leaves and bear yellow daisy flowers.

Lepidospartum burgessii is an endangered species.

Species

- Lepidospartum burgessii - gypsum scalebroom - New Mexico, Texas
- Lepidospartum latisquamum - Nevada broomsage - California, Nevada, Utah
- Lepidospartum squamatum - California broomsage - California, Arizona, Baja California
