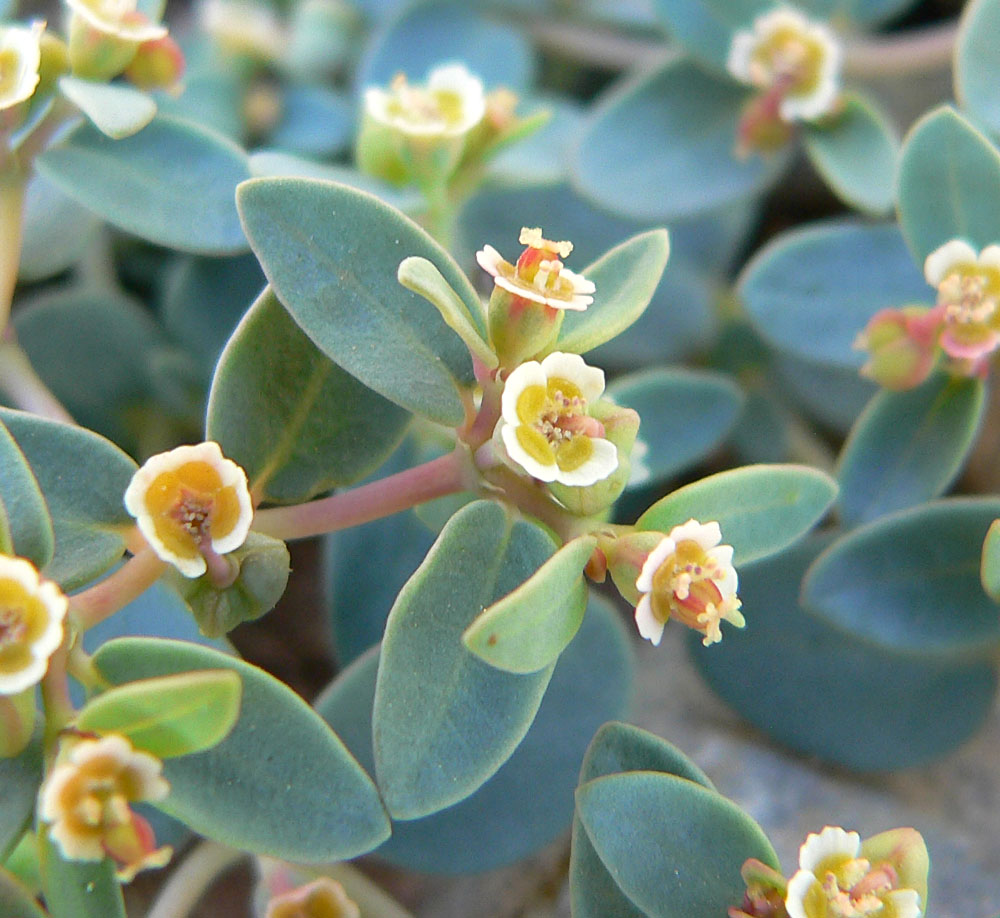

Conservation status
- Secure (NatureServe)

Scientific classification
- Kingdom: Plantae
- Clade: Tracheophytes
- Clade: Angiosperms
- Clade: Eudicots
- Clade: Rosids
- Order: Malpighiales
- Family: Euphorbiaceae
- Genus: Euphorbia
- Species: E. fendleri

Binomial name
- Euphorbia fendleri Torr. & A.Gray

Synonyms
- Chamaesyce fendleri

= Euphorbia fendleri =

Species of flowering plant

Euphorbia fendleri is a species of Euphorbia known by the common name Fendler's sandmat. It is native to much of the southwestern and central United States and northern Mexico, where it grows in scrub and woodland habitat in desert and plateau regions. This is a mat- or clump-forming reddish-green plant with a crooked, creeping, hairless stem. The leaves are rounded, oval, or spade-shaped, smooth along the edges and generally coming to a point, and not much more than one centimeter in maximum length. The tiny inflorescence is a cyathium with white-edged, scalloped appendages surrounding the actual flowers. There is a ring of 25 to 35 staminate flowers around one pistillate flower. The ovary of the pistillate flower enlarges into a lobed fruit about 2 millimeters long.
