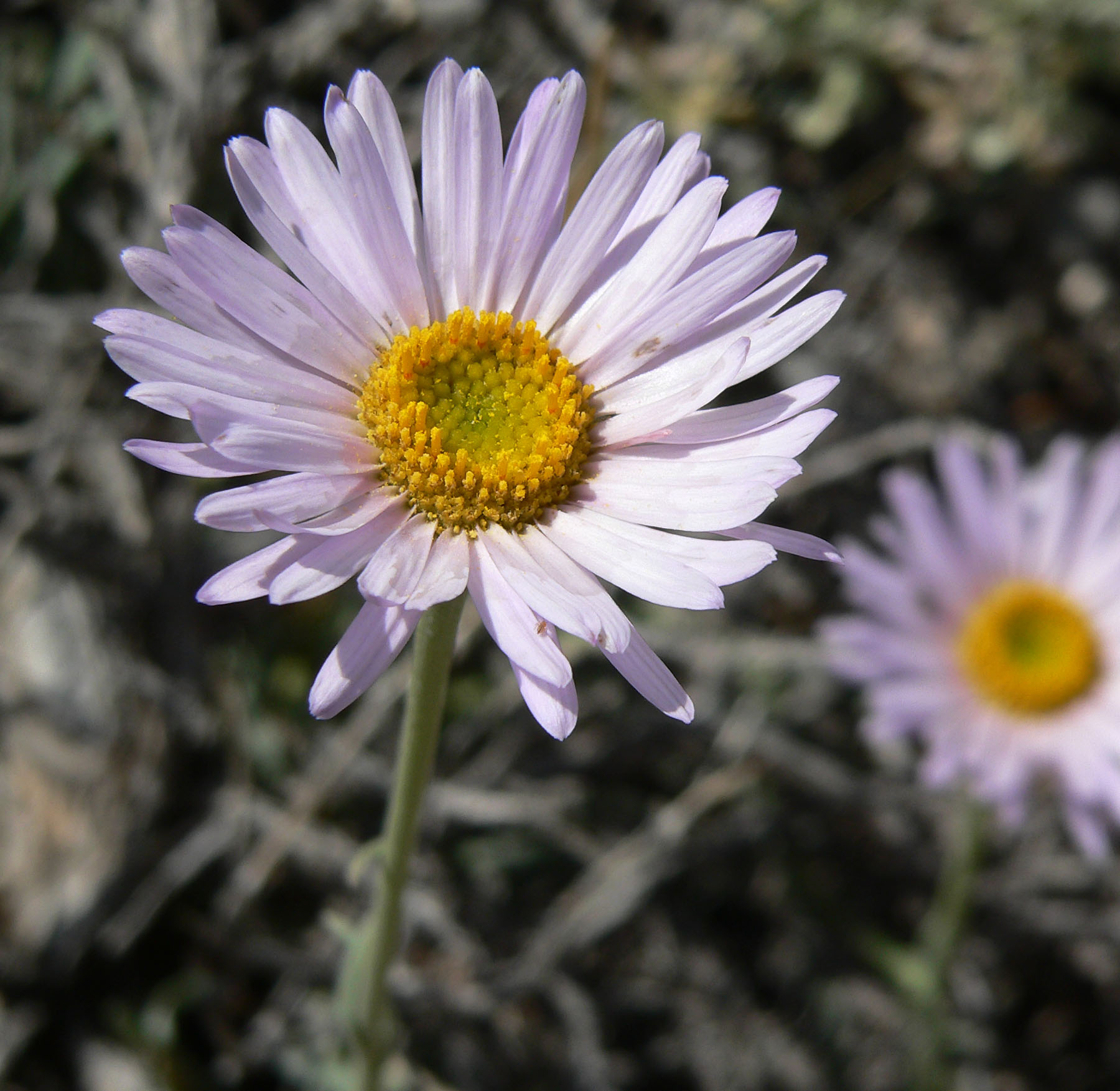

Scientific classification
- Kingdom: Plantae
- Clade: Tracheophytes
- Clade: Angiosperms
- Clade: Eudicots
- Clade: Asterids
- Order: Asterales
- Family: Asteraceae
- Genus: Erigeron
- Species: E. argentatus

Binomial name
- Erigeron argentatus A.Gray

Synonyms
- Erigeron argentatum A.Gray; Wyomingia argentata (A.Gray) A.Nelson

= Erigeron argentatus =

Species of flowering plant

Erigeron argentatus is a species of flowering plant in the family Asteraceae known by the common name silver fleabane. It is native to the western United States (Utah, Nevada, eastern California, northern Arizona, northwestern New Mexico, southern Colorado).

Erigeron argentatus grows in woodlands and rocky mountainous habitat. It is a small perennial attaining a maximum height from 10 to 40 centimetres (4–16 inches). It grows in clumps with leaves and erect stems covered in dense white or silvery hairs. Most of the leaves are near the base of the plant and are somewhat erect and a few centimetres long. The stems bear single flower heads each 1–2 centimetres (0.4–0.8 inches) wide with blue or lavender ray florets and golden yellow disc florets.
