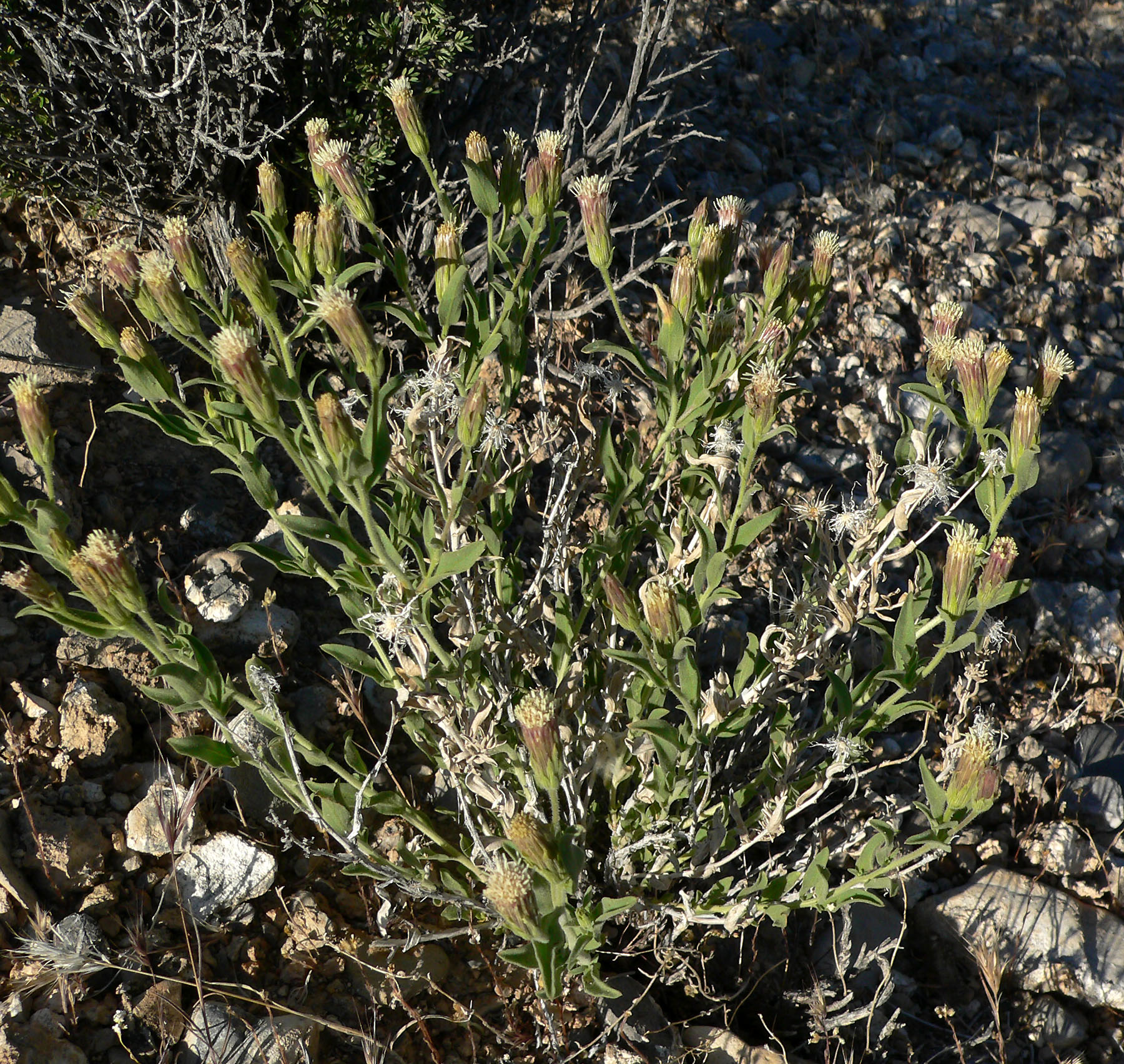

Conservation status
- Secure (NatureServe)

Scientific classification
- Kingdom: Plantae
- Clade: Tracheophytes
- Clade: Angiosperms
- Clade: Eudicots
- Clade: Asterids
- Order: Asterales
- Family: Asteraceae
- Genus: Brickellia
- Species: B. oblongifolia

Binomial name
- Brickellia oblongifolia Nutt.

Synonyms
- Brickellia mohavensis A.Gray; Coleosanthus abbreviatus Greene; Coleosanthus humilis Greene; Coleosanthus mohavensis (A.Gray) Kuntze; Coleosanthus oblongifolius (Nutt.) Kuntze; Brickellia linifolia D.C.Eaton, syn of var. linifolia

= Brickellia oblongifolia =

Species of flowering plant

Brickellia oblongifolia, the Mojave brickellbush, is North American species of plants in the family Asteraceae. It is widespread across arid and semi-arid regions in the western United States and Canada, from British Columbia south to southern California, Arizona, and New Mexico.

Brickellia oblongifolia is a perennial herb of subshrub up to 60 cm (24 inches) tall, growing from a woody caudex. Flower heads sometime appear one at a time, sometimes in groups of several, each head cream-colored or pale yellow-green, containing disc florets but no ray florets.

Varieties

- Brickellia oblongifolia var. linifolia (D.C.Eaton) B.L.Rob. - Arizona, California, Nevada, Utah, New Mexico, Colorado, Wyoming, Montana, Idaho, Washington
- Brickellia oblongifolia var. oblongifolia - British Columbia, Washington, Idaho, Oregon, Nevada, Montana
