= Inyo Mountains =

Mountain range in California, United States

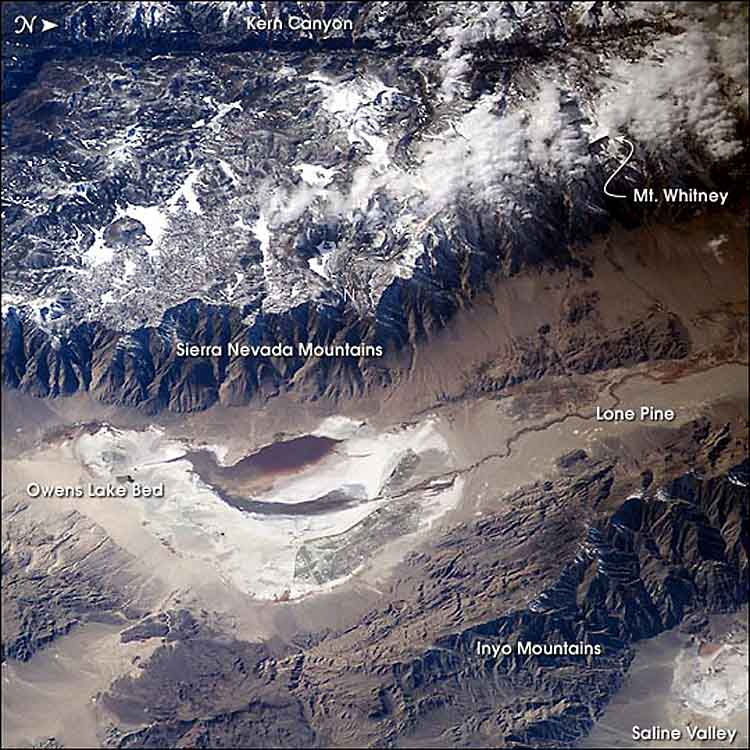
- Inyo Mountains from space

Highest point
- Peak: Waucoba Mountain, ~18 mi (29 km) southeast of Big Pine.
- Elevation: 11,123 ft (3,390 m)
- Coordinates: 36°10′00″N 118°00′03″W

Dimensions
- Length: 70 mi (110 km)
- Width: 10 mi (16 km)

Geography
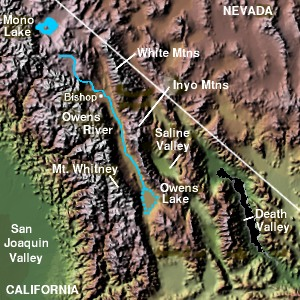
- Country: United States
- States: California; Nevada
- Parent range: Basin and Range Province
- Borders on: White Mountains, Sierra Nevada

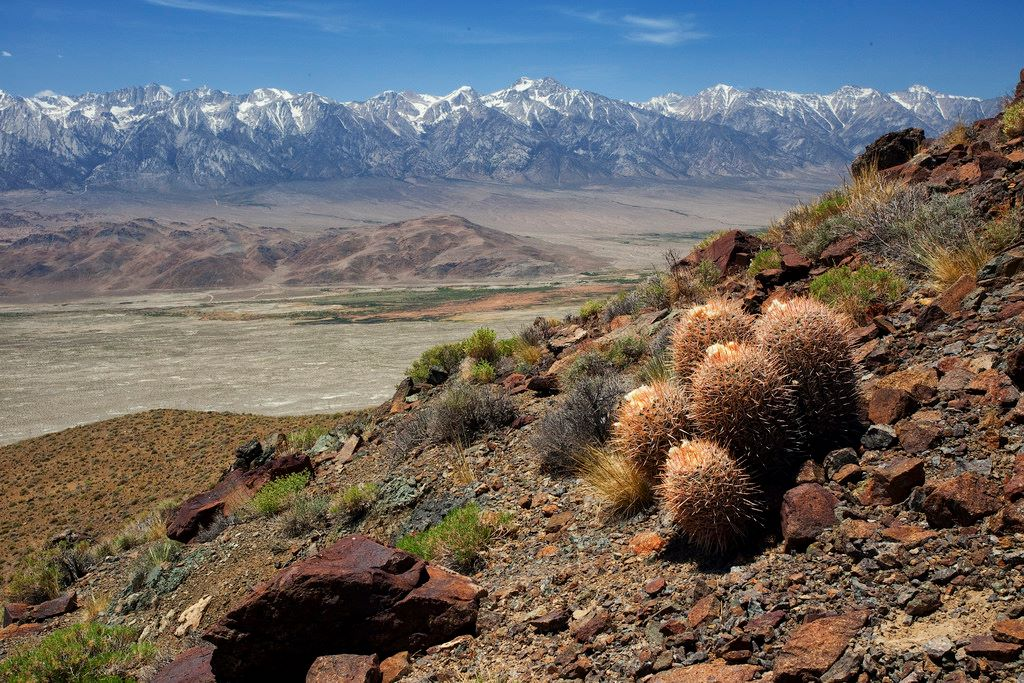
Inyo Mountain Wilderness

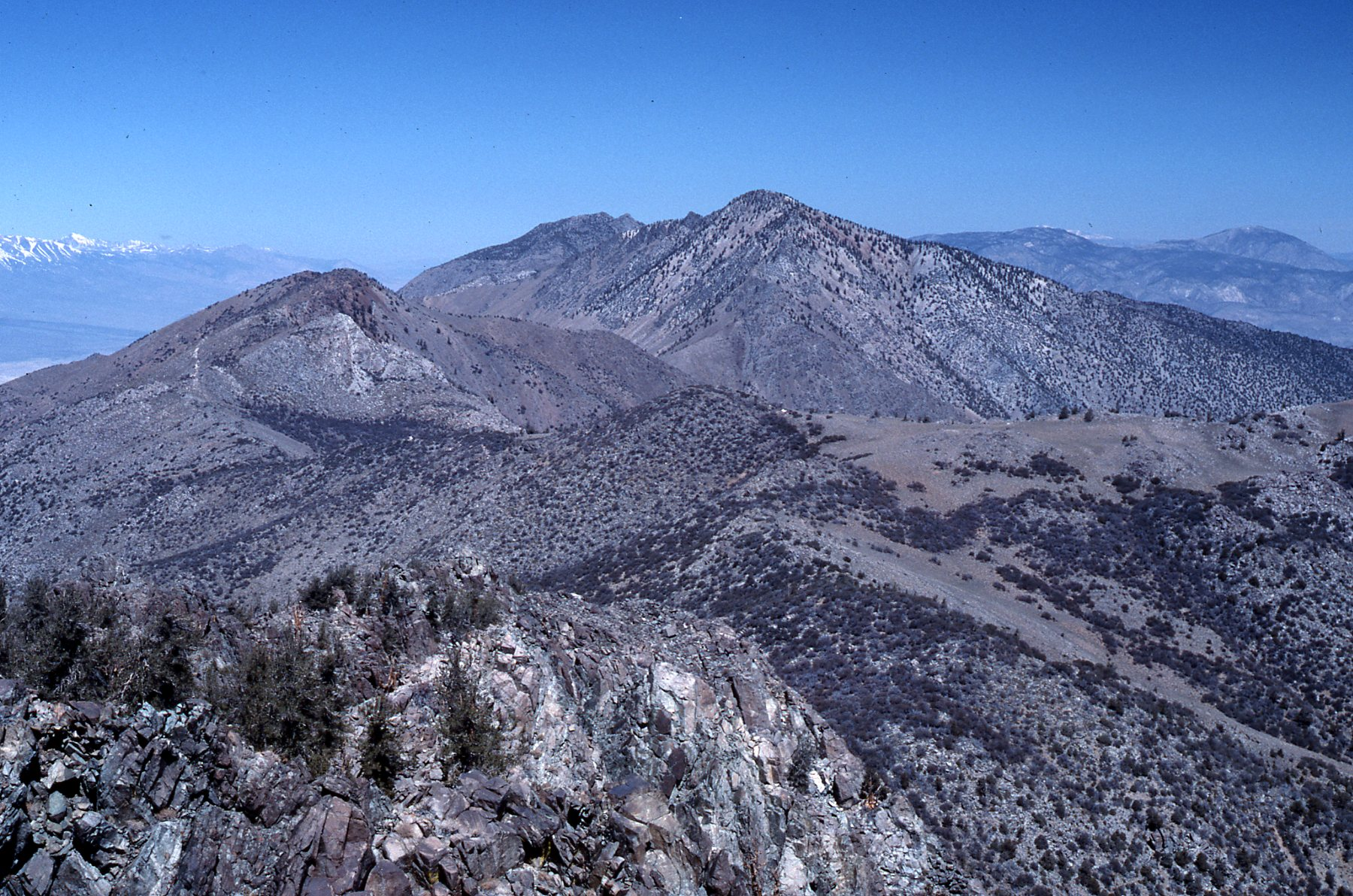
Inyo Mountain crest, north of New York Butte

The Inyo Mountains are a short mountain range east of the Sierra Nevada in eastern California in the United States. The range separates the Owens Valley to the west from Saline Valley to the east, extending for approximately 70 miles (110 km) south-southeast from the southern end of the White Mountains, from which they are separated by Westgard Pass, to the east of Owens Lake.

Geologically, the mountains are a fault block range in the Basin and Range Province, at the western end of the Great Basin. They are considered to be among the most important and best-known Late Proterozoic to Cambrian sections in the United States.

== Wilderness ==
Most of the mountain range (199,208 acres (806.17 km^{2})) is designated as the Inyo Mountain Wilderness, managed by the Bureau of Land Management in the south and the United States Forest Service in the north. The USFS manages 73,300 acres (297 km^{2}) of the wilderness all within Inyo National Forest.

Wildlife in the area includes the endangered Inyo Mountains salamander and the desert bighorn sheep. Plant communities include creosote and sagebrush at lower altitudes, and bristlecone pine forests at higher altitudes. A number of rare and endemic plants are adapted to the unique limestone soils of the mountains, including the cliffdweller, bristlecone cryptantha, and Inyo rock daisy.
