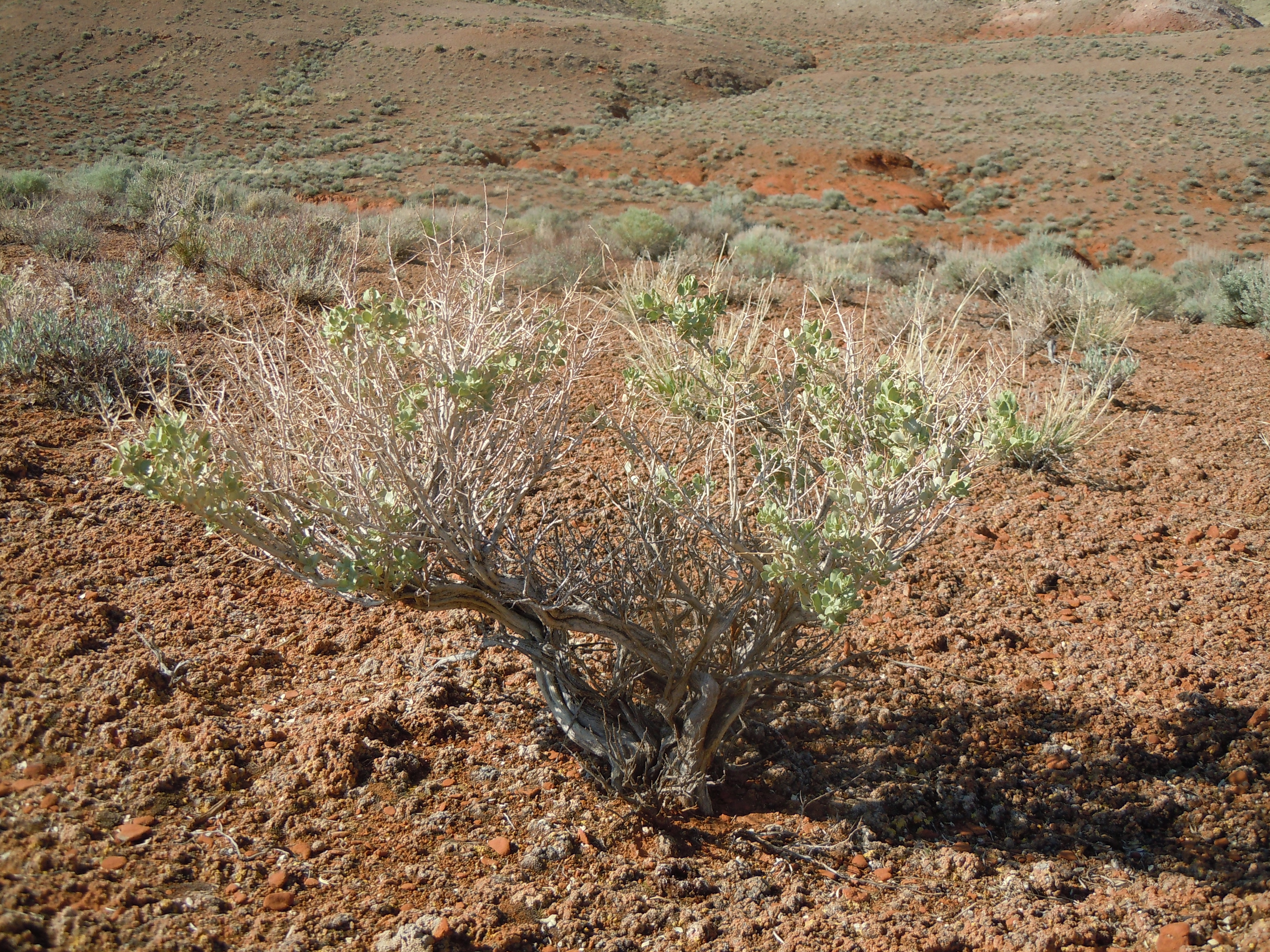

Conservation status
- Secure (NatureServe)

Scientific classification
- Kingdom: Plantae
- Clade: Tracheophytes
- Clade: Angiosperms
- Clade: Eudicots
- Order: Caryophyllales
- Family: Amaranthaceae
- Genus: Atriplex
- Species: A. confertifolia

Binomial name
- Atriplex confertifolia Torr. & Frém.

Synonyms
- Atriplex collina Wooton & Standl.; Atriplex jonesii Standl.; Atriplex sabulosa M.E.Jones 1903 not Rouy 1890; Atriplex subconferta Rydb.; Obione confertifolia Torr. & Frém.; Obione rigida Torr. & Frém.

= Atriplex confertifolia =

Species of flowering plant

Atriplex confertifolia, the shadscale or spiny saltbush, is a species of evergreen shrub in the family Amaranthaceae, which is native to the western United States and northern Mexico.

== Description ==
The height of Atriplex confertifolia varies from 1–3 ft (0.30–0.91 m). Shadscale fruits and leaves provide important winter browse for domestic livestock and native herbivores. Compared to fourwing saltbush (Atriplex canescens), shadscale has shorter and wider leaves and the fruit does not have four wings (although it may have two wings in a "V" shape).

This species blooms from March to June.

Maximum osmotic pressure has been reported in Atriplex conf. where it is about 202.5 atm.

== Distribution and habitat ==
Shadscale is a common, often dominant, shrub in the lowest and driest areas of the Great Basin. It prefers sandy, well-drained soils and it is tolerant of moderately saline conditions. Its habitats include alkaline desert valleys, hillsides, and bluffs.
