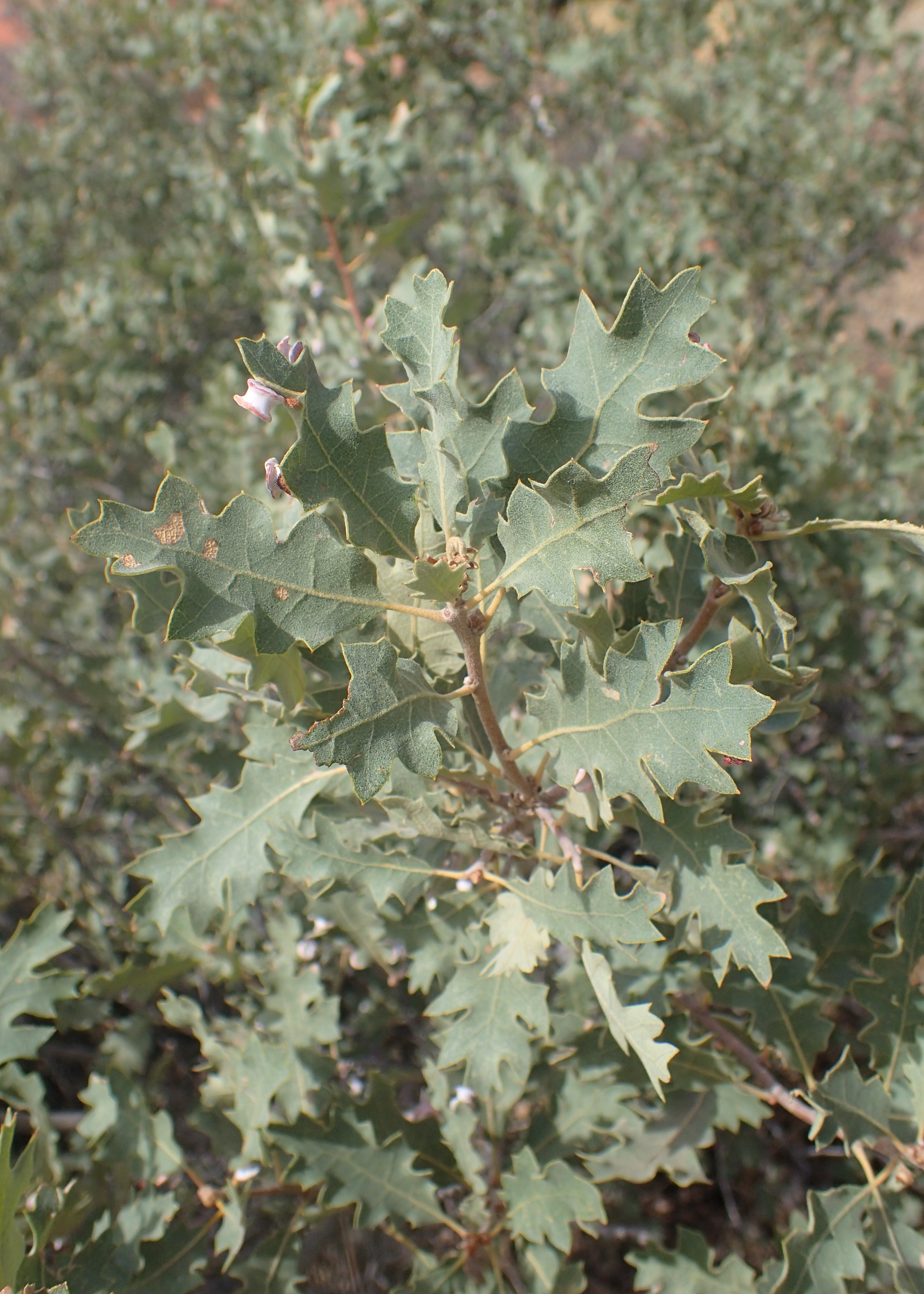

Scientific classification
- Kingdom: Plantae
- Clade: Tracheophytes
- Clade: Angiosperms
- Clade: Eudicots
- Clade: Rosids
- Order: Fagales
- Family: Fagaceae
- Genus: Quercus
- Subgenus: Quercus subg. Quercus
- Section: Quercus sect. Quercus
- Species: Q. welshii

Binomial name
- Quercus welshii R.A.Denham

Synonyms
- Quercus havardii var. tuckeri S.L.Welsh

= Quercus welshii =

Species of shrub

Quercus welshii, the wavy leaf oak, shinnery oak, or Tucker oak, is a North American species of shrub in the (beech family) found in the Colorado Plateau and Canyonlands region of the southwestern United States.

== Description ==
=== Growth pattern ===
Quercus welshii is a deciduous shrub 2 to 6 feet (0.61 to 1.83 meters) tall.

=== Roots, stems, and leaves ===
The plant has an elaborate root system, anchoring it in sandy soils and helping stabilize soils in sandy desert scrub communities.

The leaves are elliptical or lance-shaped with 6–10 lobes along the margins and pointed tips, sometimes with lobes and teeth.

The leaves are up to 1/2 to 2 in (1.3 to 5.1 cm) long with dense hairs on both sides, becoming smooth with age.

=== Inflorescence and fruit ===
Quercus welshii blooms from March to June.

Male and female flowers are in separate hanging clusters.

Acorns are 1/2 to 3/4 in (13 to 19 millimeters) long.

== Taxonomy ==
The species was first described by Stanley Larson Welsh in 1986 as Quercus havardii var. tuckeri. It was raised to a full species by R.A. Denham in 2003 using the replacement name Quercus welshii, named after Welsh, as the name Quercus tuckeri had already been used for a fossil species. Quercus welshii has been included within Quercus havardii, but both morphological and molecular evidence suggests that it is distinct. Quercus welshii is not included in a 2017 list of Quercus species by subgenus and section, but Quercus havardii is placed in Quercus sect. Quercus.

== Distribution and habitat ==
Quercus welshii can be found in sand desert shrub communities, and sandy soils of blackbrush scrub and pinyon–juniper woodland communities in Arizona, Utah, western Colorado, and northwestern New Mexico.
