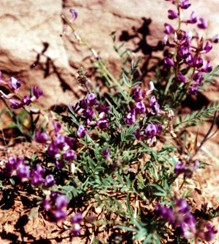

Conservation status
- Secure (NatureServe)

Scientific classification
- Kingdom: Plantae
- Clade: Tracheophytes
- Clade: Angiosperms
- Clade: Eudicots
- Clade: Rosids
- Order: Fabales
- Family: Fabaceae
- Subfamily: Faboideae
- Genus: Astragalus
- Species: A. desperatus

Binomial name
- Astragalus desperatus M.E.Jones

Varieties
- Astragalus desperatus var. conspectus Barneby; Astragalus desperatus var. desperatus; Astragalus desperatus var. neeseae Barneby; Astragalus desperatus var. petrophilus M.E.Jones

Synonyms
- List: Astragalus barnebyi S.L.Welsh & N.D.Atwood (1975); Astragalus desperatus var. typicus Barneby (1948); Astragalus equisolensis Neese & S.L.Welsh (1981); Batidophaca despelata (M.E.Jones) Rydb. (1929); Batidophaca petrophila (M.E.Jones) Rydb. (1929); Tium desperatum (M.E.Jones) Rydb. (1905)

= Astragalus desperatus =

Species of flowering plant in the pea family

Astragalus desperatus (common name - rimrock milkvetch) is a perennial plant in the legume family (Fabaceae) found in the Colorado Plateau and Canyonlands region of the southwestern United States.

== Description ==
=== Growth pattern ===
It is a low growing perennial plant growing from 1/2 to 4 1/2 inches (1.3 to 11.4 cm) tall.

=== Leaves and stems ===
Compound pinnate leaves are from 1/2 to 4 1/2 inches (1.3 to 11.4 cm) long, with 7–17 elliptical to inversely lanceolate leaflets.

=== Inflorescence and fruit ===
It blooms from March to August. The inflorescence are from stalk to 5 inches (13 cm) tall, with multiple flowers on short stems from the stalk. Each ink to purple flower has a calyx tube that is bell-shaped and up to 1/2 inch (1.3 cm) long, and petals to 1/4 inch (0.64 cm) long. Seed pods are up to 3/4 inch (1.9 cm) long, elliptical or curved, and covered with stiff hairs.

== Habitat and range ==
It grows only on the Colorado Plateau (endemic) in mixed desert shrub and pinyon-juniper forest communities.
