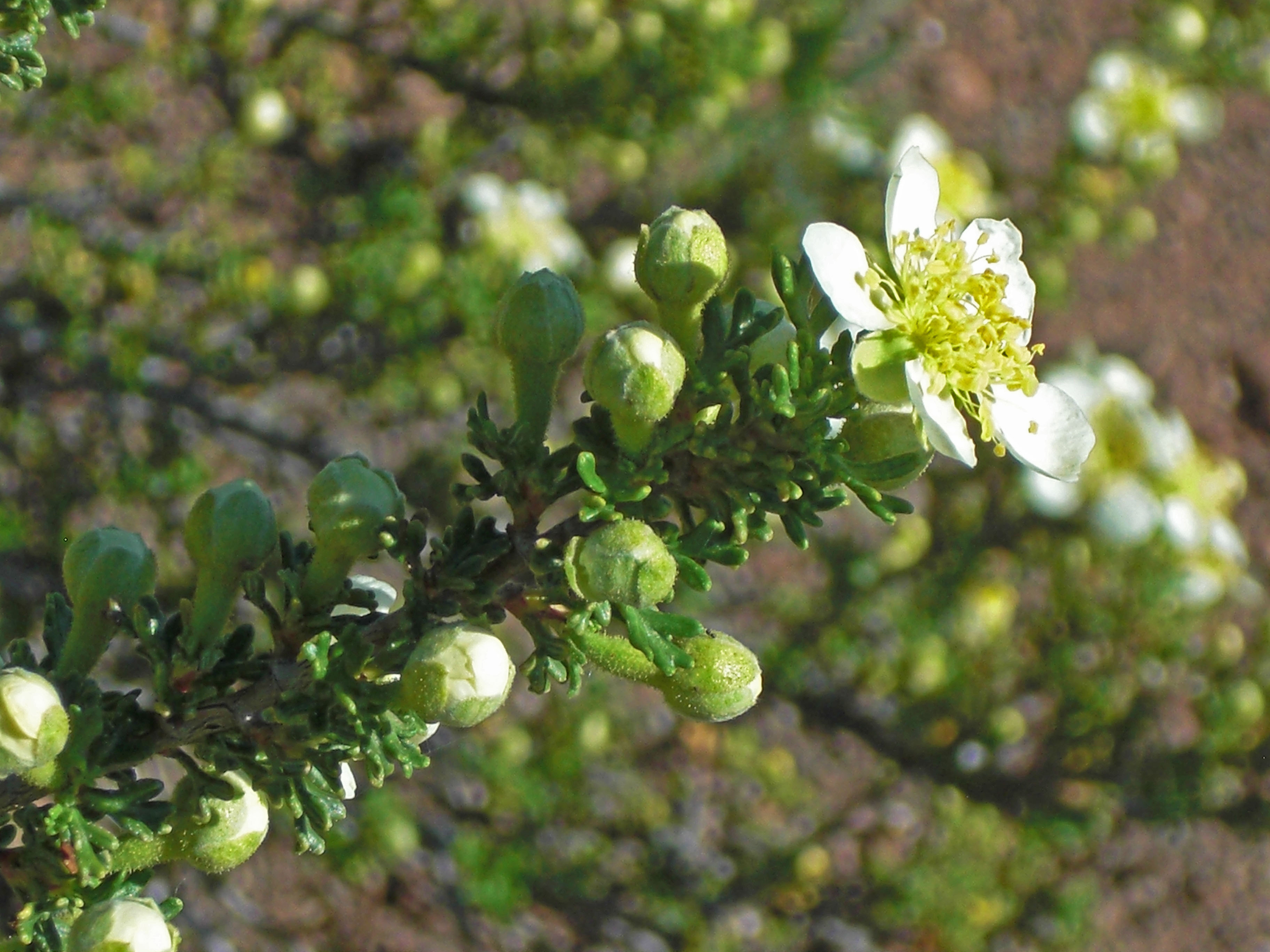

Conservation status
- Least Concern (IUCN 3.1)

Scientific classification
- Kingdom: Plantae
- Clade: Tracheophytes
- Clade: Angiosperms
- Clade: Eudicots
- Clade: Rosids
- Order: Rosales
- Family: Rosaceae
- Genus: Purshia
- Species: P. mexicana

Binomial name
- Purshia mexicana (D.Don) S.L.Welsh

Synonyms
- Cowania mexicana D.Don; Cowania mexicana A.Gray; Cowania mexicana var. dubia Brandegee; Cowania purpurea Zucc.; Greggia purpurea Engelm. ex Hemsl.

= Purshia mexicana =

Species of plant in Mexico

Purshia mexicana is a species of perennial flowering small tree in the rose family known by the common name Mexican cliffrose. It is native to western-northern Mexico, the region of the Sierra Madre Occidental cordillera.

Purshia stansburyana, native to the southwestern United States, has sometimes been included within P. mexicana.

In its mostly mountainous, or higher elevation habitat, it grows in woodlands, desert, and plateau habitat.

Stenophyllanin A, a tannin, can be found in P. mexicana.

== Distribution ==
The range of Mexican cliffrose is from the western Mexican Plateau in the south, and the southern Sierra Madre Occidental cordillera north to a small region of northwest Sonora; it has a continuous range in the cordillera from Chihuahua south through Durango and Zacatecas, all mostly north of the Trans-Mexican Volcanic Belt, though a few scattered locales do occur in the belt.

== Uses ==
The plant is browsed by deer, cattle, and sheep, and is particularly important to these species during the winter.

Native Americans made ropes and clothing from the bark, and fashioned arrow shafts from the stems.
