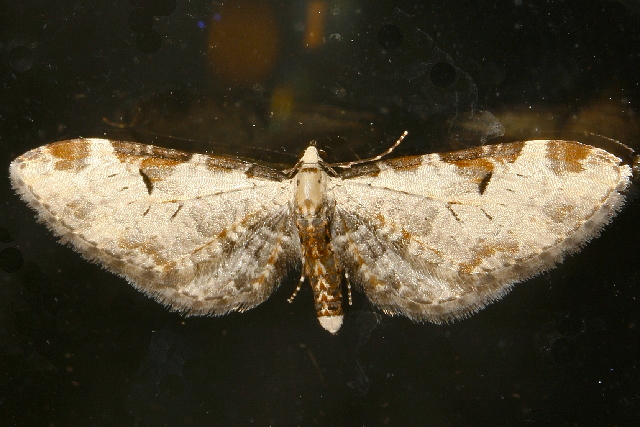

Scientific classification
- Kingdom: Animalia
- Phylum: Arthropoda
- Clade: Pancrustacea
- Class: Insecta
- Order: Lepidoptera
- Family: Geometridae
- Genus: Eupithecia
- Species: E. nevadata

Binomial name
- Eupithecia nevadata Packard, 1871

Synonyms
- Eupithecia moirata Swett & Cassino, 1919; Eupithecia probata Swett & Cassino, 1919

= Eupithecia nevadata =

Species of moth

Eupithecia nevadata is a moth in the family Geometridae first described by Alpheus Spring Packard in 1871. It is found in western North America.

The wingspan is about 20 mm. The forewings are pale grey with various reddish brown patches along the costa.

The larvae feed on Purshia and Ceanothus species.

== Subspecies ==
- Eupithecia nevadata nevadata (Nevada, California)
- Eupithecia nevadata geneura Swett & Cassino, 1919 (Utah, Colorado)
- Eupithecia nevadata morensata Cassino & Swett, 1922 (southern California)

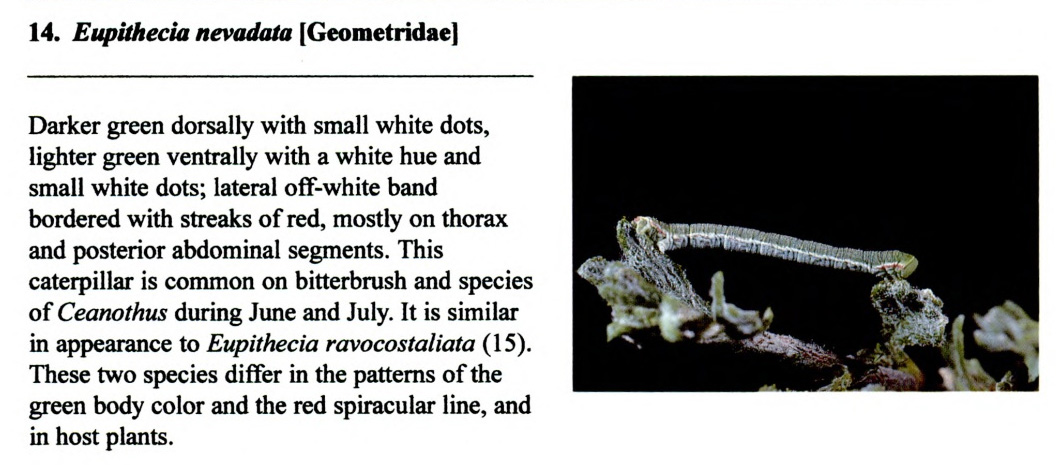
Eupithecia nevadata caterpillar
