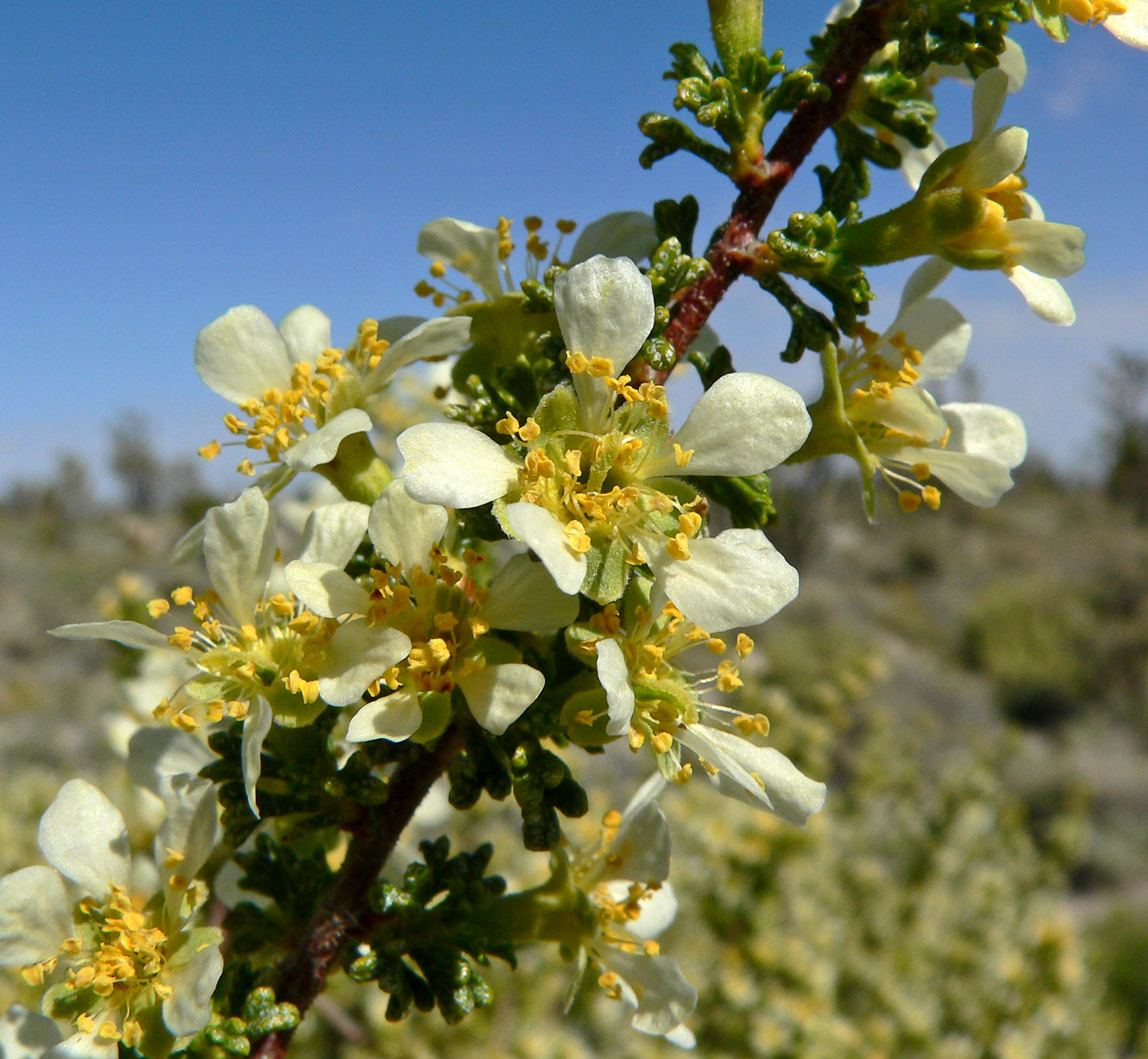

Conservation status
- Secure (NatureServe)

Scientific classification
- Kingdom: Plantae
- Clade: Tracheophytes
- Clade: Angiosperms
- Clade: Eudicots
- Clade: Rosids
- Order: Rosales
- Family: Rosaceae
- Genus: Purshia
- Species: P. glandulosa

Binomial name
- Purshia glandulosa Curran

= Purshia glandulosa =

Species of tree

Purshia glandulosa is a species of flowering plant in the rose family known by the common names antelope bitterbrush, desert bitterbrush, Mojave antelope brush, and cliff-rose.

== Distribution ==
The plant is endemic to the southwestern United States, where it occurs in California, Arizona, southern Nevada, and Utah. It is found in the Great Basin region, Mojave Desert, and chaparral-sagebrush scrub ecotone in the Eastern Sierra Nevada, Tehachapi Mountains, Eastern Transverse Ranges, and Peninsular Ranges. Other habitats include pinyon-juniper woodland, conifer forest, and Joshua tree woodland.

This species arose via hybridization between Purshia stansburiana (Stansbury cliffrose) and Purshia tridentata (antelope bitterbrush) . It is sometimes considered a variety of the latter species. It can hybridize with both of its parent species.

This plant can grow on many types of soils, mainly those that are well-drained. It can grow on sites that have little soil, such as rock outcrops, and it is a pioneer species of eroded rock habitat. It does not tolerate large amounts of water, especially in the summer, and it favors areas that have an annual precipitation around 10 inches. It is tolerant of fire, layering and resprouting easily after its aboveground parts burn. The varieties grow from 500–3,500 metres (1,600–11,500 ft) elevation.

== Description ==
Purshia glandulosa is an evergreen shrub growing up to 4.5 metres (15 ft) tall, but often remaining smaller depending on environmental conditions. It has a deep taproot which may extend nearly 5 metres (16 ft) deep in the soil, an adaptation to drought. At times, the plant produces root nodules where it can fix nitrogen.

The flowers are white and fragranced. The bloom period can range from February through June, depending on the variety.

It reproduces by seed, by layering, and by resprouting from its root crown. It can also regenerate from root bits that are severed several feet below ground. Regeneration from seed is relatively uncommon, because its seeds have low rates of germination and they do not easily yield seedlings that will survive. The seeds have a very hard coat and germinate better if they are stratified. Also, the plant does not produce seed until it is approximately 10 years old.

=== Varieties ===
Named varieties of the species include:

- Purshia tridentata var. glandulosa — from California to Nevada, Utah, Arizona, and northwestern Mexico.
- Purshia tridentata var. tridentata — from California to British Columbia, Montana, and New Mexico.

== Uses ==
The Navajo, Klamath, Paiute, Shoshoni, and other Native American tribes used it as a traditional medicinal plant. The bark of the tree was used as a trade item by the Navajo, primarily for its use in blending with animal fur for the production of clothing and in making bedding material, as well as for making infant cradle boards.

The plant is a good forage for wild ungulates such as pronghorn, as well as livestock. It is not deciduous, so its foliage is available to animals in the winter.
