= Blackbush scrub =

Vegetation type of the Western United States deserts

Blackbush scrub, or blackbrush scrub, is a vegetation type of the Western United States deserts characterized by low growing, dark gray blackbush (Coleogyne ramosissima) as the dominant species. Blackbush often occurs in pure stands, giving a uniform dark gray appearance to the landscape.

== Mojave Desert ==
Blackbrush scrub occurs over a wide elevation range in the Mojave Desert. It may occur as an understory in Joshua tree woodland or pinyon-juniper woodland. Associates in the Mojave Desert include ephedra (Ephedra nevadensis, Ephedra viridis), hop-sage Grayia spinosa, turpentine broom (Thamnosma montana), horsebrush (Tedradymia spp.), cheesebush (Ambrosia salsola), and winter fat (Krascheninnikovia lanata).

== Colorado Plateau ==
In the Colorado Plateau, it occurs across uniformly thin soils.
