= Flora of the Colorado Plateau and Canyonlands region =

The flora of the Colorado Plateau and Canyonlands region is generally characterized by plant adaptations to the arid conditions of the region, and a wide variation of plant communities from wide variations in elevation and soil types. The elevation variation results in temperature variation. Differing soil types are largely due to erosion of different sedimentary layers in the canyons, from the layers at lowest point of canyons of the Colorado River network, to the top layers of the plateau. Exceptions to flora adapted to aridity occur in lowland riparian areas, at springs, and in hanging gardens.

== Plant communities ==
=== Salt desert shrub community ===
The salt desert shrub is a plant community or vegetation type found in the Colorado Plateau and Canyonlands region. It is characterized by very alkaline and saline soils and plants that can tolerate these conditions (halophytes). Dominant plant species include shadscale (Atriplex confertifolia), greasewood (Sarcobatus vermiculatus), and Mormon tea (Ephedra viridis).

=== Blackbrush scrub community ===
Blackbush scrub, or blackbrush scrub, is a vegetation type of the Western United States deserts characterized by low growing, dark gray blackbush (Coleogyne ramosissima) as the dominant species. Blackbush often occurs in pure stands, giving a uniform dark gray appearance to the landscape.In the Colorado Plateau, it occurs across uniformly thin soils.

=== Sand desert shrub community ===
The sand desert shrub (SDS) is a plant community, or vegetation type, found in the Colorado Plateau and Canyonlands region in areas of shifting sands or very sandy soils. Dominant plant species include old man sage (Artemisia filifolia), yucca, Indian ricegrass (Stipa hymenoides), and wavy leaf oak (Quercus welshii). A common characteristic of plants in this community is a very deep and extensive root system, which helps stabilize the sand dunes, or an ability to adjust to the shifting sands. In the Glen Canyon area, it can be found in lower elevation mesas, canyons, and terraces to 4,500 feet (1,400 m) in elevation.

=== Mixed desert shrub community ===
Mixed desert shrub is a plant community, or vegetation type, found in the Colorado Plateau and Canyonlands region of the southwestern United States. It is supported by a range of overlapping and intergrading soil types. Characteristic dominant plant species include rubber rabbitbrush (Chrysothamnus nauseosus), fourwinged saltbrush (Atriplex canescens), blackbrush (Coleogyne ramosissima), and dwarf mountain mahogany (Cercocarpus intricatus). It is generally located at the elevation belt (zone) above sand desert shrub and below cool desert shrub.

=== Pinyon juniper woodland community ===
The pinyon–juniper plant community covers a large portion of Utah and the Canyonlands region. Singleleaf ash (Fraxinus anomala), and Utah serviceberry (Amelanchier utahensis) are codominants of pinyon pine and Utah juniper. In this region, the community occurs on rocky soils or jointed bedrock.

=== Mountain brush community ===
Mountain brush is a plant community or vegetation type of the Colorado Plateau and Canyonlands region. It covers large parts of the mountain foothills and shaded canyons in areas below the Ponderosa pine community. It is characterized by dominance by shrubby Gambel's Oak (Quercus gambelii), Utah serviceberry (Amelanchier utahensis), sagebrush (Artemisia tridentata), and mountain mahogany (Cercocarpus montanus).

=== Ponderosa pine forest ===
The Jeffrey pine and the ponderosa pine are common in drier montane areas of the Sierra Nevada. They are often confused by casual observers. Across much of the remainder of the American West, Jeffrey pine is absent, with ponderosa pine being the sole yellow pine.

Jeffrey pine is more stress tolerant than ponderosa pine in the Sierra Nevada. At higher elevations, on poorer (including ultramafic) soils, in colder climates, and in drier climates, Jeffrey pine replaces ponderosa as the dominant tree (Jeffrey pine forest). Ponderosa pine-dominated forests ("Ponderosa pine forest") occur at elevations from about 300 to 2,100 m (980 to 6,890 ft). Jeffrey pine-dominated forests occur mostly in California, from 1,500 to 2,400 m (4,900 to 7,900 ft) in the north, and 1,700 to 2,800 m (5,600 to 9,200 ft) in the south. The highest elevations are typically on the east side of the Sierra Nevada. "Eastside pine forest" refers to areas of Lassen National Forest, Plumas National Forest, and Tahoe National Forest, all on the east of the Sierra Nevada crest, where ponderosa and Jeffrey pine codominate.

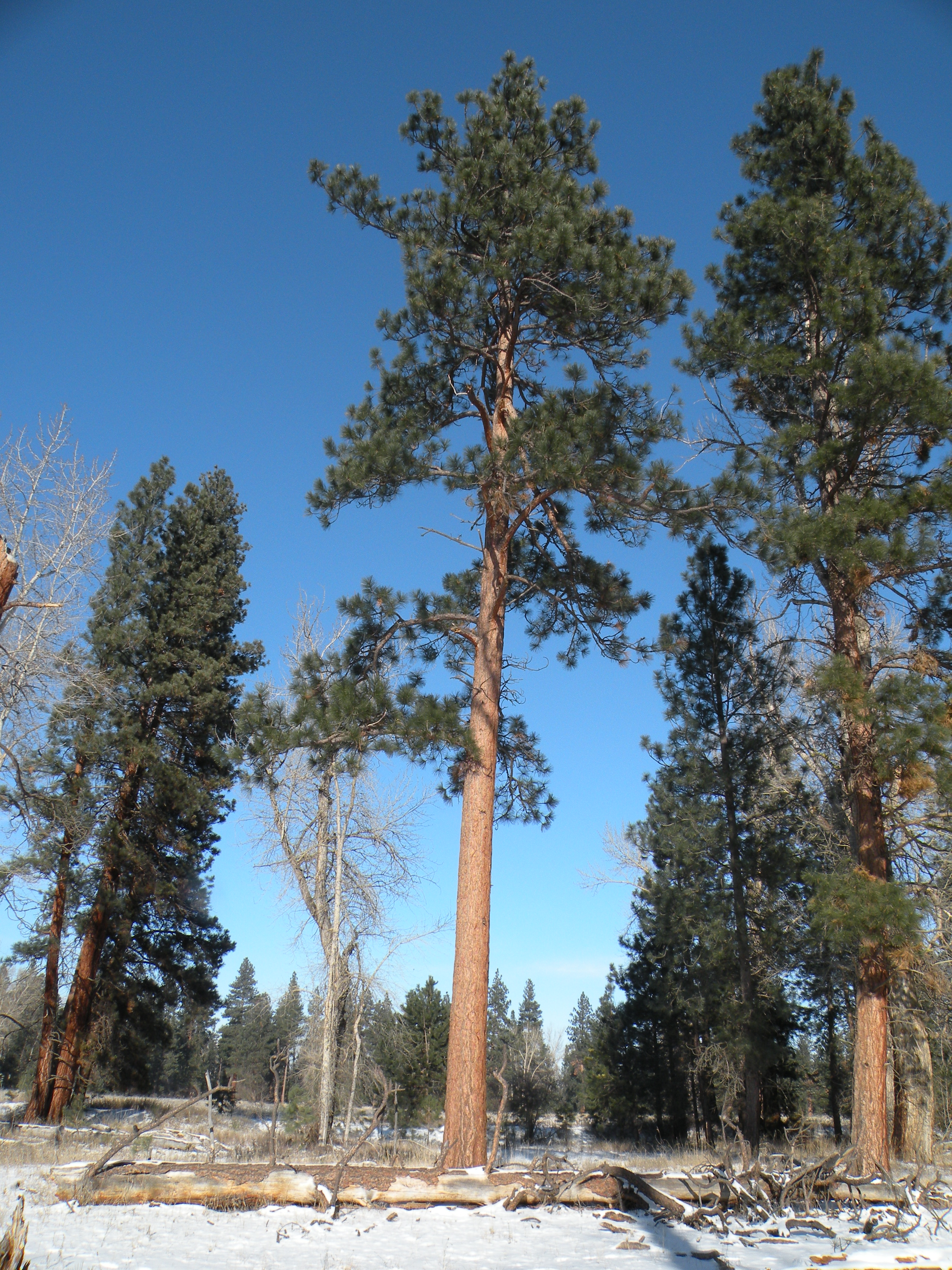
A group of ponderosa pine trees

Ponderosa pine forests occurs on the Colorado Plateau and in the Sierra Nevada of the Western United States, as well as other parts of North America.

One way to distinguish between them is by their cones. Each has barbs at the end of the scales. The sharp Jeffrey pine cone scale barbs point inward, so the cone feels smooth to the palm of one's hand when rubbed down the cone. Ponderosa pine cone scale barbs point outward, so feel sharp and prickly to the palm of one's hands. Another distinguishing characteristic is that the needles of Jeffrey pine are glaucous, less bright green than those of ponderosa pine, and by the stouter, heavier cones with larger seeds and inward-pointing barbs.

Jeffrey pine wood and ponderosa pine wood are sold together as yellow pine. Both kinds of wood are hard (with a Janka hardness of 550 lbf (2,400 N)), but the western yellow pine wood is less dense than southern yellow pine wood (28 lb/cu ft (0.45 g/cm^{3}) versus 35 lb/cu ft (0.56 g/cm^{3}) for shortleaf pine).
