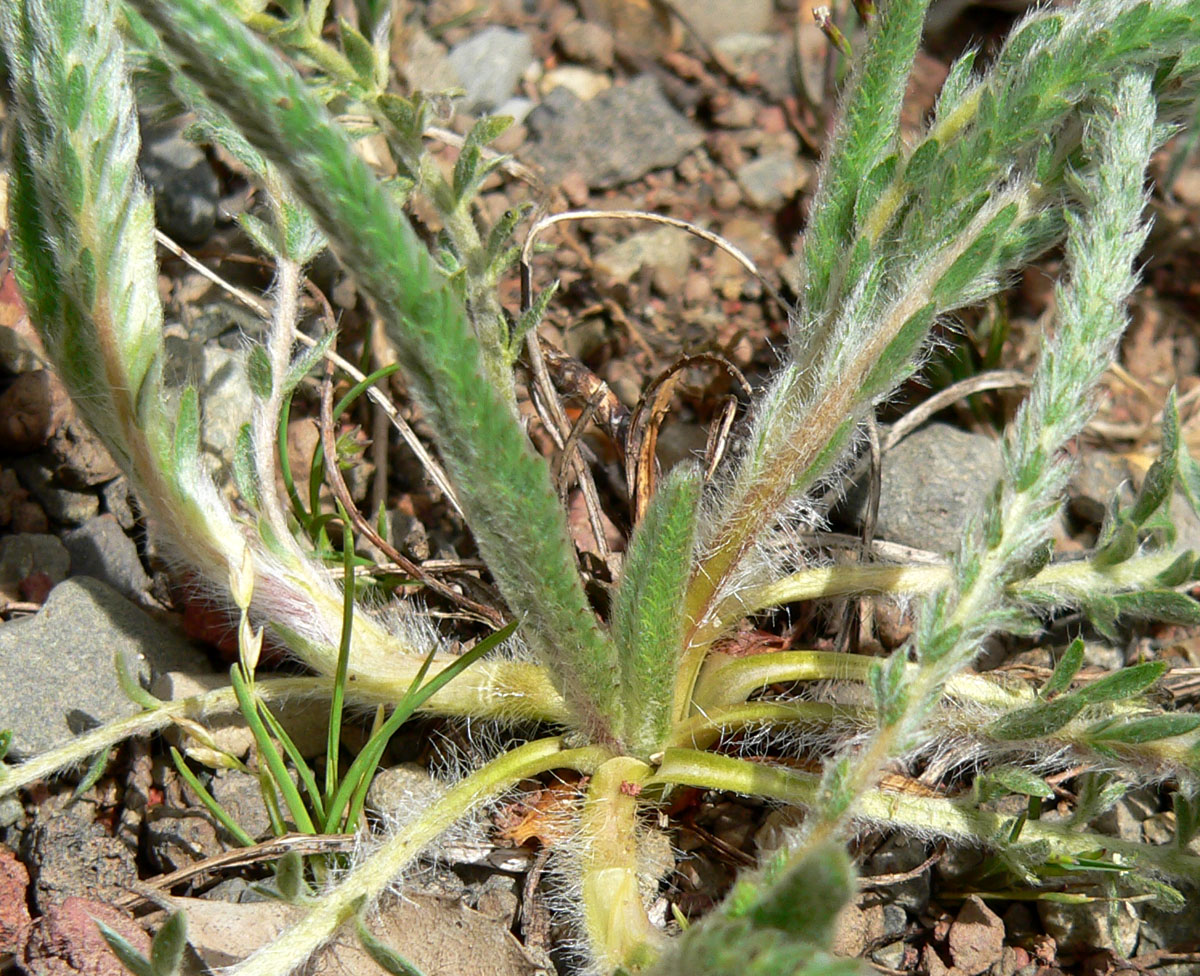

Conservation status
- Imperiled (NatureServe)

Scientific classification
- Kingdom: Plantae
- Clade: Tracheophytes
- Clade: Angiosperms
- Clade: Eudicots
- Clade: Rosids
- Order: Rosales
- Family: Rosaceae
- Genus: Potentilla
- Species: P. sericoleuca

Binomial name
- Potentilla sericoleuca (Rydb.) J.T.Howell

Synonyms
- Horkelia sericoleuca Rydb.; Ivesia sericoleuca (Rydb.) Rydb.

= Potentilla sericoleuca =

Species of flowering plant

Potentilla sericoleuca, commonly known as Plumas mousetail and Plumas ivesia, is a species of flowering plant in the rose family.

== Distribution ==
The plant is endemic to eastern California, in the Northern Sierra Nevada and onto the southern Modoc Plateau.

It grows at elevations of 1,300–2,320 metres (4,270–7,610 ft), in sagebrush scrub, yellow pine forest meadows, and freshwater wetland−riparian habitats.

== Description ==
Potentilla sericoleuca is a small perennial herb forming a tuft on the ground. Each leaf is a flat to cylindrical strip of many hairy green leaflets, each individual leaflet 3 to 15 millimeters long and each whole leaf 10 to 20 centimeters long. The mostly naked stem is erect or drooping and reaches a maximum height or length of about 45 centimetres (18 in).

It bears an inflorescence of several clusters of hairy flowers. Each flower is just over a centimeter wide, with triangular reddish-green or yellowish sepals and round to spoon-shaped white petals. In the center of the flower are usually 20 stamens and several pistils.
