= Acronicta perdita =

Scientific classification
- Kingdom: Animalia
- Phylum: Arthropoda
- Clade: Pancrustacea
- Class: Insecta
- Order: Lepidoptera
- Superfamily: Noctuoidea
- Family: Noctuidae
- Genus: Acronicta
- Species: A. perdita

Binomial name
- Acronicta perdita Grote, 1874

Species of moth

Acronicta perdita is a moth of the family Noctuidae. It is found from British Columbia south to California.

The wingspan is 42–46 mm. Adults are on wing from April to July depending on the location.

The larvae feed on Ceanothus and Purshia species.
