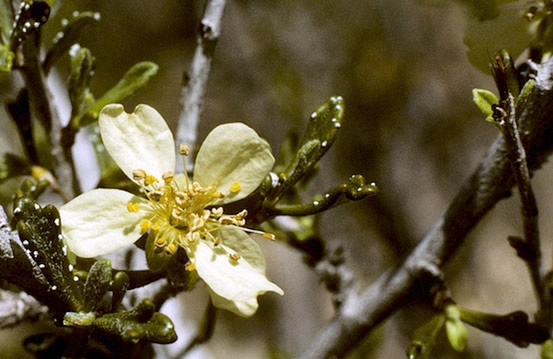

Conservation status
- Imperiled (NatureServe)

Scientific classification
- Kingdom: Plantae
- Clade: Tracheophytes
- Clade: Angiosperms
- Clade: Eudicots
- Clade: Rosids
- Order: Rosales
- Family: Rosaceae
- Genus: Purshia
- Species: P. subintegra

Binomial name
- Purshia subintegra (Kearney) Henrickson

Synonyms
- Cowania subintegra Kearney; Purshia pinkavae Schaack

= Purshia subintegra =

Species of flowering plant

Purshia subintegra, commonly known as Arizona cliffrose, is a species of flowering plant in the family Rosaceae. It is a shrub endemic to central Arizona, where it is known from four populations in Maricopa, Mohave, and Yavapai counties. It grows on gravelly clay loams over white, calcareous deposits in dry chaparral and shrubland dominated by creosote bush (Larrea tridentata).

Purshia subintegra is threatened by habitat degradation from recreational and utility expansion, overgrazing by deer and cattle, clearance and herbicide spraying along roads and electric power line corridors, competition and predation by invasive species, and hybridization with Purshia stansburyana. Known populations occur mostly on federal and State of Arizona-owned land. NatureServe assesses the species as Imperiled.

The species was first described as Cowania subintegra by Thomas Henry Kearney in 1943. In 1986 James Solberg Henrickson placed the species in genus Purshia as P. subintegra. Some authorities treat it as a hybrid, Purshia × subintegra.
