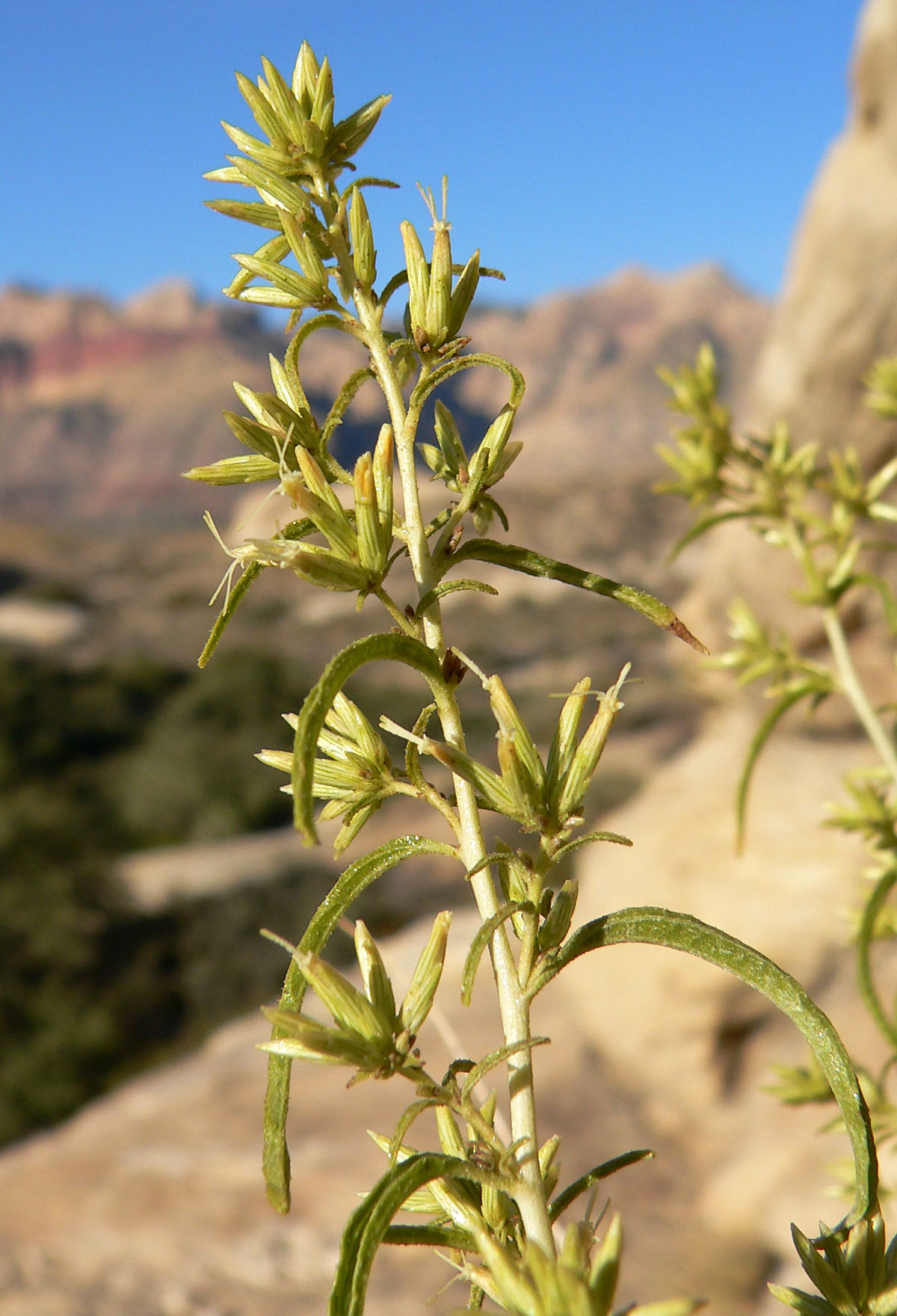
- Spring Mountains, Nevada

Conservation status
- Apparently Secure (NatureServe)

Scientific classification
- Kingdom: Plantae
- Clade: Tracheophytes
- Clade: Angiosperms
- Clade: Eudicots
- Clade: Asterids
- Order: Asterales
- Family: Asteraceae
- Genus: Brickellia
- Species: B. longifolia

Binomial name
- Brickellia longifolia S.Watson

Synonyms
- Coleosanthus longifolius (S.Watson) Kuntze

= Brickellia longifolia =

Species of flowering plant

Brickellia longifolia, the longleaf brickellbush, is a shrub in the family Asteraceae. It is found in the Colorado Plateau and Canyonlands region of the southwestern United States, in Arizona, Utah, Nevada, and western Colorado.

Some authors consider the closely related Mojave Desert plants as a variety of B. longifolia but others recognize it as a distinct species, B. multiflora.

== Description ==
=== Growth pattern ===
Brickellia longifolia is a densely branched shrub from 3 to 6 feet (0.91 to 1.83 m) tall.

=== Leaves and stems ===
Narrow, stalkless leaves are 3/8 to 4 3/4 inches (0.95 to 12.07 cm) long and taper to a point.

=== Inflorescence and fruit ===
Brickellia longifolia blooms from June to September. Small green flowers are in clusters of 3-5 per head, with only disk flowers, and many clusters on a stalk that is elongated from the top of each branch.

== Habitat and range ==
It can be found in moist areas near seeps and riparian areas in Southern Utah, with occurrences from California to Arizona.
