= Pinyon–juniper woodland =

Biome of Western United States higher elevation deserts

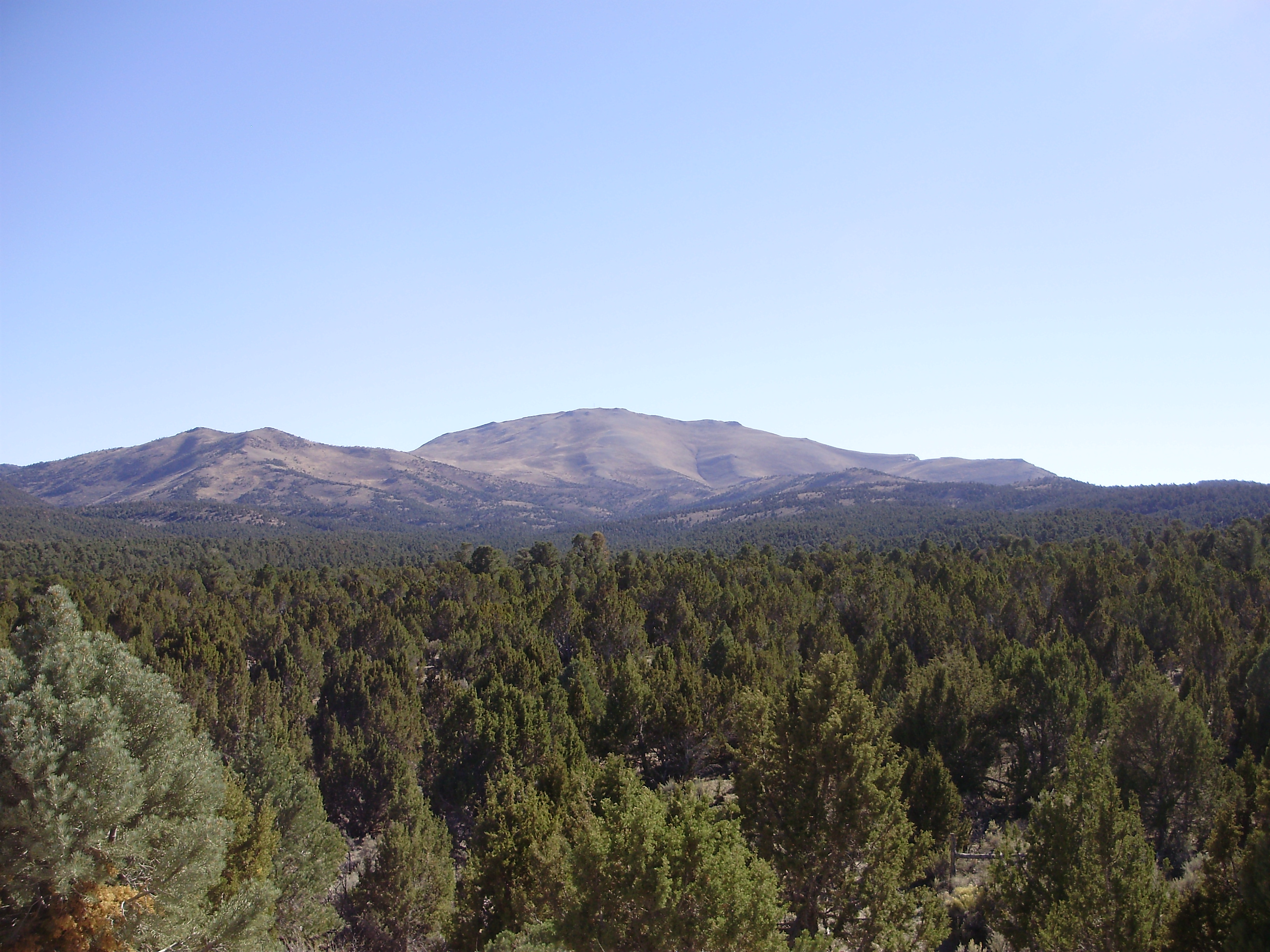
Single-leaf pinyon–Utah juniper woodland in northeastern Nevada near Overland Pass at the south end of the Ruby Mountains

Pinyon–juniper woodland, also spelled piñon–juniper woodland, is a biome found mid-elevations in arid regions of the Western United States, characterized by being an open forest dominated by low, bushy, evergreen junipers, pinyon pines, and their associates. At lower elevations, junipers often predominate and trees are spaced widely, bordering on and mingling with grassland or shrubland, but as elevation increases, pinyon pines become common and trees grow closer, forming denser canopies. Historically, pinyon-juniper woodland provided a vital source of fuel and food (particularly piñon nuts) for indigenous peoples of the American Southwest. The nuts continue to be a traditional indigenous food, and because nut-collecting was also adopted by the Spanish in the 1500s, the nuts are also traditionally harvested by some Hispanic communities.

As of the early 2020s, pinyon-juniper ecosystems have been under pressure from heavy natural gas extraction in southern Colorado and New Mexico. They have also been historically destroyed by land managers in the United States in favor of livestock pasture, due to a lack of perceived economic value. Pinyon-juniper woodlands also face threats from severe droughts caused or exacerbated by climate change, both through direct damage from heat and lack of moisture and through exacerbated insect attacks and wildfires. In some areas of New Mexico, more than 90% of piñon pines in a woodland have died due to long-term drought and insect attacks. However, in other areas the ecosystem is expanding, and while animals face threats from the woodlands becoming less diverse and productive, it is debated whether pinyon-juniper woodlands are gaining or losing territory overall.

== Ecology ==
Both pinyon pine and juniper species reproduce exclusively through seed production, and produce most of their seeds during mast years, which occur about every three to five years. The seeds produced by the pinyon pines in mast cycles are the primary influence on population growth in the habitat; in lean years some animals move away in a nomadic fashion. Birds and small mammals in the ecosystem are the main distribution method for these seeds. An important example is the pinyon jays, a keystone species that is the primary distribution mechanism for pinyon pine seeds, having formed a mutualistic relationship with the trees. These birds are the only species capable of re-establishing pinyon pines after major disruptions like fires and beetle infestations, and according to Audubon are critical to the ecosystem's survival.

Pinyon-juniper woodlands support a number of native species including the pinyon mouse and the pinyon jay. The woodlands also serve as refuges for desert and mountain animals attempting to escape heat or cold; few animals other than the pinyon jay stay in the ecosystem year-round. However, it serves as important habitat for a number of endangered species, including Woodhouse's scrub jay and the gray vireo.

== Subtypes ==
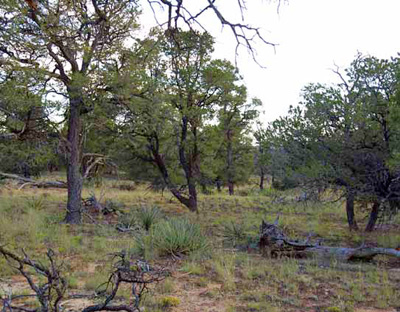
Pinyon-juniper savannah

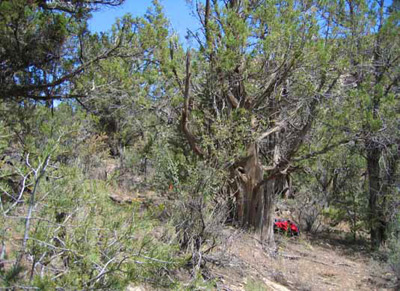
Pinyon-juniper persistent woodland

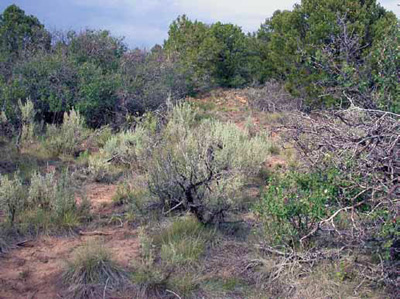
Pinyon-juniper shrubland

Pinyon–juniper woodland has three major subtypes based on vegetation: pinyon-juniper savannah, pinyon-juniper wooded shrubland, and pinyon-juniper persistent woodland.

=== Pinyon-juniper savannah ===
Pinyon-juniper savannahs are dominated by grasses and forbs, with dense undergrowth and savannah-like sparser trees. Monsoon summer rains are common in pinyon-juniper savannahs, since they favor the growth of warm-season grasses. Common grass species are blue grama, other species of grama grass, new mexico muhly, curlyleaf muhly, and needle and thread grass.

=== Pinyon-juniper persistent woodlands ===
Pinyon-juniper persistent woodlands are dominated by trees, with a variety of tree ages, often in areas with winter or bi-modal precipitation. Persistent woodland sites are usually unproductive, with thin soils and sparse ground or shrub cover, often occurring on rocky or rugged terrain.

=== Pinyon-juniper wooded shrublands ===
Pinyon-juniper wooded shrublands are transition zones where pinyon-juniper woodland is expanding or contracting, often bordering other vegetation types. In absence of fire, they shift from grass and forb-dominated, to shrub-dominated, to tree-dominated communities over time. Common shrub species are big sagebrush, other species in that genus, antelope bitterbrush, rabbitbrush, mountain mahogany, and snakeweed.

== Range and species composition ==
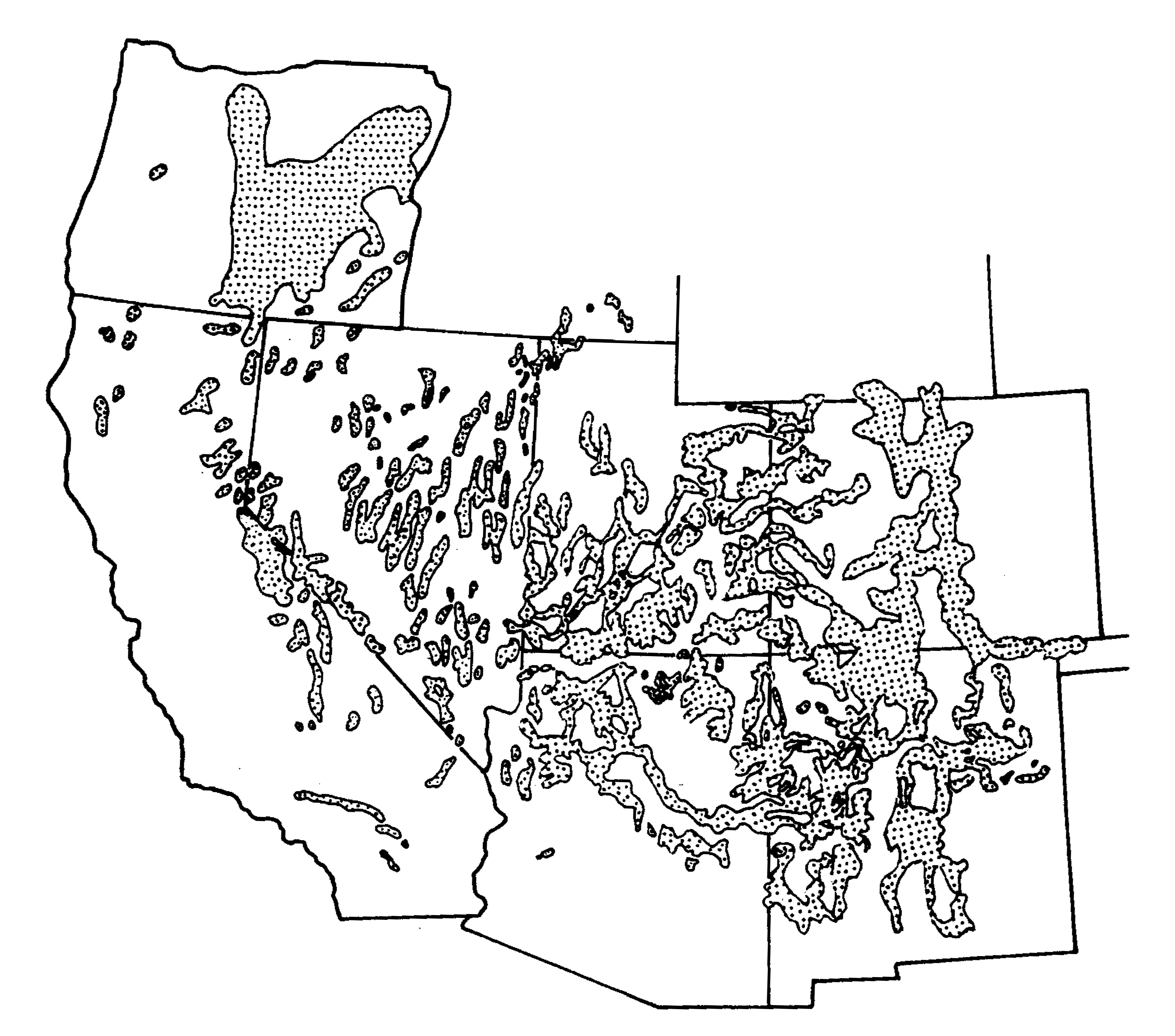
Range of pinyon–juniper Woodlands in the Western United States (1988)

Today, pinyon–juniper woodland range spans from New Mexico, to the eastern Sierra Nevada, the Colorado Plateau, the Great Basin, and higher elevations of Mountain ranges of the Mojave Desert. The woodland's range includes the Mogollon Rim in the south, to its northern extent in the Snake River Plain.

It typically occurs at between 4,500 to 7,500 ft (1,400 to 2,300 m). Historically, however, the range and elevations of pinyon-juniper woodland have shifted based on differences in climate. On the order of 10,000 years ago during the Wisconsin glaciation, pinyon-juniper woodlands occurred in areas that today are the Chihuahuan, Mojave, and Sonoran desert lowlands, and since then pinyon-juniper altitude ranges have continued to change based on changing moisture and temperature ranges over time.

In the last 200 years specifically, the area occupied by pinyon-juniper woodlands has increased by two to six times. This is attributed to a number of factors, but especially the direct and indirect effects of climate, overgrazing and altered fire regimes. Specifically, the wet period between the 1800s and 1900s boosted tree establishment, and livestock grazing both eliminated perennial grass cover that would hinder tree establishment, and removed fine fuels that could start large fires.

Due to its temperature tolerance, pinyon generally does not naturally grow north of northern Utah, as well as some portions of southern Wyoming and Idaho. Pinyon-juniper woodlands prefer areas with cold winters and hot, dry summers. Usually, the habitat experiences freezing temperatures 150 or more days a year, with 6 to 20 in (150 to 510 mm) of annual precipitation, mostly falling as snow.

=== Arizona and New Mexico ===
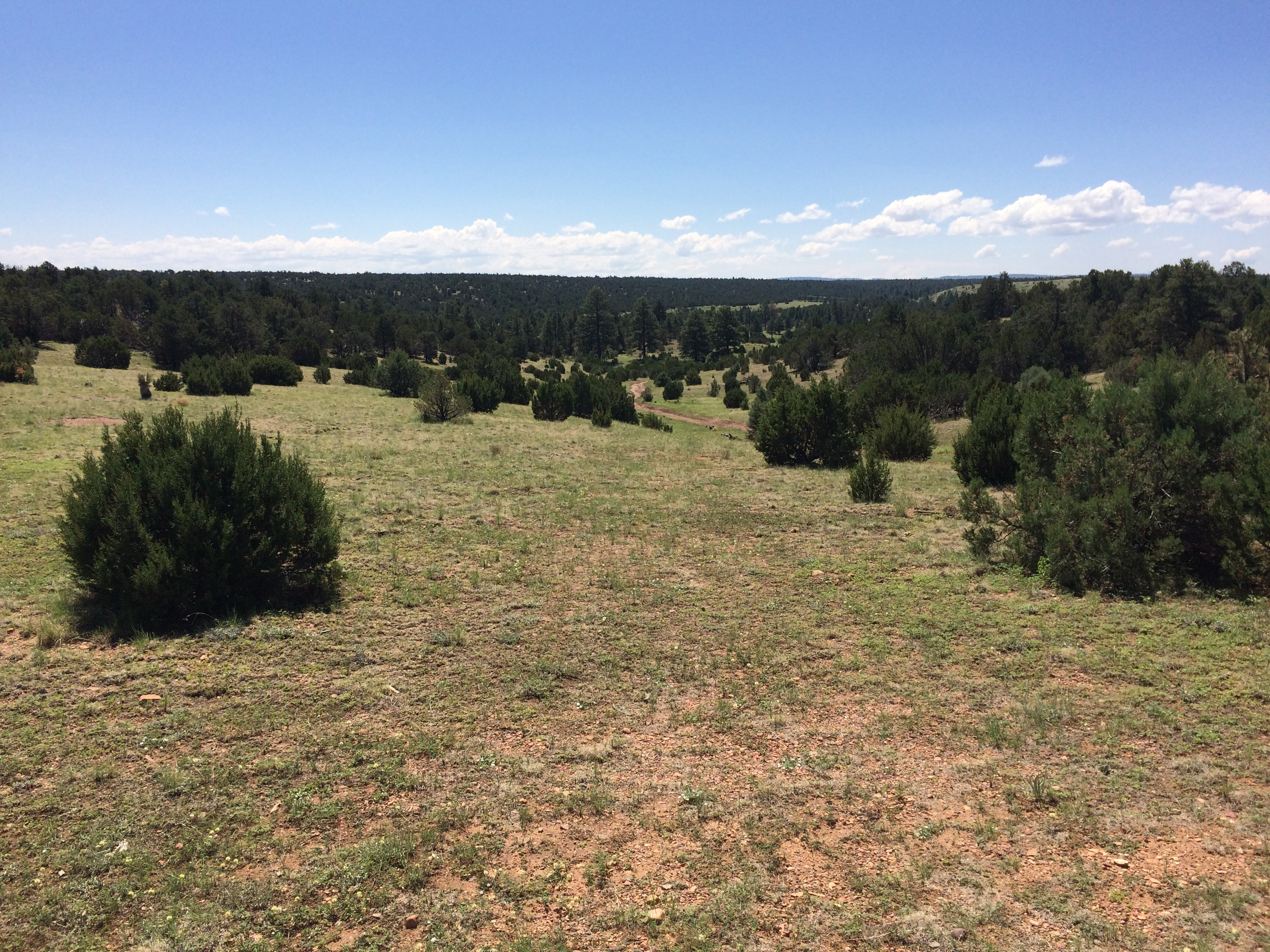
Some pinyon-juniper woodland in Arizona

The pinyon–juniper woodland is one of the most prevalent types of coniferous woodland in northern Arizona and New Mexico. In Arizona the great basin woodland species are Juniperus arizonica, Juniperus californica in western Arizona, Juniperus deppeana, Juniperus monosperma, Juniperus osteosperma, Juniperus scopulorum at higher elevations, Pinus monophylla var. fallax below the Colorado plateau, and Pinus edulis on the Colorado plateau. In Arizona the great basin woodland includes many species of oaks: Quercus turbinella, Quercus gambelii at higher elevations, Quercus grisea, Quercus arizonica, and Quercus emoryi. In Southern Arizona, Pinus discolor, Juniperus deppeana, and Pinus leiophylla make up the conifer woodland with many oak species.

=== California ===
In California, pinyon-juniper woodland is mainly found in pockets on the eastern side of the Sierra Nevada, in the White Mountains bordering Nevada, and also somewhat in the Transverse Ranges and Peninsular Ranges, as well as several isolated patches on desert mountaintops. In the eastern Sierra Nevada, the habitat forms in the transition zone between the wetter conifer forests to the west and the drier deserts to the east, in the gradient that forms due to the mountains' rain shadow.

In the eastern Sierra Nevada, the elevation range is 4,000 to 5,500 ft (1,200 to 1,700 m) in the north, and 5,000 to 8,000 ft (2,000 to 2,000 m) feet in the southern reaches of the range. Pinyon–juniper woodland requires 12 to 20 in (300 to 510 mm) of annual precipitation, so is generally located above the sagebrush scrub vegetation type, which can survive on an average of 7 in (180 mm) per year. It is located below the alpine zone. There is often an understory dominated by sagebrush (Artemisia tridentata) and its associates. Co-dominants include Jeffrey Pine (Pinus jeffreyi) and an understory of sagebrush scrub (Artemisia spp.) or rabbitbrush scrub (Ericameria spp.).

=== Utah and Canyonlands region ===
The pinyon–juniper plant community covers a large portion of Utah and the Canyonlands region. Singleleaf ash (Fraxinus anomala), and Utah serviceberry (Amelanchier utahensis) are codominants of pinyon pine and Utah juniper. In this region, the community occurs on rocky soils or jointed bedrock.

=== Mojave Desert ===
In the steppes adjoining the Mojave Desert, this vegetation type can be found in areas receiving 12 to 20 in (300 to 510 mm) inches of annual precipitation, and between 4,500 to 8,000 ft (1,400 to 2,400 m). Associates include bitterbrush (Purshia glandulosa), Apache plume (Fallugia paradoxa), desert sagebrush (Artemisia tridentata), green ephedra (Ephedra viridis), mountain mahoganies (Cercocarpus spp.), and buckwheats (Eriogonum spp.). In the Mojave, pinyon–juniper woodlands are generally above the Joshua Tree woodlands vegetation type, and requires more annual precipitation.

=== By Major Land Resource Area ===
Part, though not all, of the range of pinyon-juniper woodlands occurs interspersed with sagebrush throughout the D-region Major Land Resource Areas, including in D-35, D-36, D-38, and D-39, as well as in the two E-region areas E-49 and E-51.

==== D-35 (Colorado Plateau) ====
In the D-35 (Colorado Plateau) region, pinyon-juniper appears in a mosaic with sagebrush ecosystems extending across the region. Understories generally include galleta (Hilaria rigida), blue grama (Bouteloua gracilis), black grama (Bouteloua eriopoda), and western wheatgrass (Pascopyrum). However, differences exist based on soil composition and elevation. Alkaline regions at lower elevations include alkali sacaton (Sporobolus airoides), Indian ricegrass (Oryzopsis hymenoides), needled grasses (Stipa spp.), four-wing saltbush (Atriplex canescens), and winterfat (Krascheninnikovia lanata). Regions with more saline soil include greasewood (Adenostoma fasciculatum) and shadescale (Atriplex confertifolia).

==== D-36 (Southwestern Plateaus, Mesas, and Foothills) ====
In the D-36 (Southwestern Plateaus, Mesas, and Foothills) region, pinyon-juniper woodland appears in a mosaic gradient with other ecosystems based on elevation. Gambel Oak (Quercus gambelii), mountain muhly (Muhlenbergia montana), and snowberry (Symphoricarpos spp.) are interspersed throughout the lower-elevation pinyon-juniper woodlands.

==== D-38 (Mogollon Transition) ====
In the D-38 (Mogollon Transition) region, pinyon-juniper woodland is also distributed in an elevation gradient. The pinyon is predominantly Mexican pinyon pine (Pinus cembroides). Trees and shrubs associated with the ecosystem include Mexican blue oak (Quercus oblongifolia), New Mexico locust (Robinia neomexicana), buckbrush (Ceanothus cuneatus), and manzanita (Arctostaphylos spp.). Present in the understory are a diverse range of grass and forb species, including grama, needle-grasses and jojoba.

==== D-39 (Arizona and New Mexico Mountains) ====
In the D-39 (Arizona and New Mexico Mountains) region, pinyon-juniper woodland is distributed in an elevation gradient where pinyon-juniper woodlands are present at mid-elevations, over (in areas with deep soils) areas of grassland. The woodlands dominate north-facing slopes, but on north-facing slopes are intermixed with oak species and an understory of fescues, blue-grasses, and brome species. Higher elevations are dominated by firs and spruces.

==== E regions ====
In the E-49 (Southern Rocky Mountain Foothills) region, pinyon-juniper woodlands are found exclusively in lower elevations in the south. They are mixed with sagebrush, mountain mahogany (Cercocarpus spp.), grama and needled grasses, and western wheatgrass.

In the E-51 (High Intermountain Valleys) region, pinyon-juniper woodlands occur in a mosaic with shrub-grasslands extending across the region. Patches of pinyon-juniper systems are present in E-47 (Wasatch and Uinta Mountains) and E-48A (Southern Rocky Mountains).

== See also ==
- Category:Flora of the Southwestern United States
- Category:Flora of the Great Basin
- Category:Flora of the California desert regions
