= Sagebrush scrub =

American biome

Sagebrush scrub is a vegetation type (biome) of mid-to-high elevation Western United States deserts characterized by low-growing drought-resistant shrubs including the sagebrush (Artemisia tridentata) and its associates. It is the dominant vegetation type of the Great Basin Desert (Great Basin shrub steppe), occurs along the margins of the Mojave Desert, including in the southern slopes of the Sierra Nevada and the Transverse Ranges, in California, and occurs in the Colorado Plateau and in the Canyonlands, where it may be referred to as cool desert shrub.

It often occurs adjacent to piñon-juniper woodland communities, between 4,000 and 7,000 feet elevation, where annual precipitation is 8"-15", much of it snow.

It sometimes occurs in pure stands of sagebrush or with associates that vary from region to region. Sagebrush scrub may occur as an understory of pinyon-juniper woodland.

== Mojave Desert ==
In the Mojave Desert, sagebrush associates include saltbrush (Atriplex spp.), rubber rabbitbrush (Ericameria nauseosa), green ephedra (Ephedra vidris), hop-sage (Grayia spinosa), and bitterbrush (Purshia glandulosa).

== Sierra Nevada ==
Sagebrush scrub occurs in relatively deep soils along the Sierra-Cascade axis, running from Modoc County to San Bernardino County.

In the Sierra Nevada range, in California, sagebrush associates include bitterbrush (Purshia tridentata), curl-leaf mountain-mahogany (Cercocarpus ledifolius), and rabbitbrushes (Chrysothamnus spp., Ericameria spp.). Average summer temperatures are in the 80's Fahrenheit, and 10-20 degrees F in the winter. It can survive on 7 inches of annual precipitation and so is generally below the piñon-juniper woodland vegetation type, which requires 12 to 20 inches. Its range is 4,200 to 7,000 feet in the eastern Sierra Nevada range, in California.
