= Purshia plicata =

Scientific classification
- Kingdom: Plantae
- Clade: Tracheophytes
- Clade: Angiosperms
- Clade: Eudicots
- Clade: Rosids
- Order: Rosales
- Family: Rosaceae
- Genus: Purshia
- Species: P. plicata

Binomial name
- Purshia plicata (D.Don) Henrickson

Synonyms
- Cowania plicata D.Don

Species of flowering plant

Purshia plicata is a species of flowering plant in the family Rosaceae. It is endemic to Mexico, ranging from northeastern Mexico to Jalisco.

The species was first described as Cowania plicata by David Don in 1837. In 1986 James Solberg Henrickson placed the species in genus Purshia as P. plicata.
