= Stenophyllanin A =

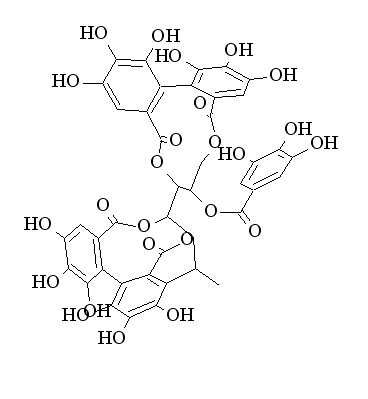
- Chemical structure of stenophyllanin A

Names
- IUPAC name [(10R,11R)-10-[(15S,19S)-19-[2-(3,4-dihydroxyphenyl)-3,5,7-trihydroxy-3,4-dihydro-2H-chromen-8-yl]-2,3,4,7,8,9-hexahydroxy-12,17-dioxo-13,16-dioxatetracyclo[13.3.1.0^{5,18}.0^{6,11}]nonadeca-1,3,5(18),6,8,10-hexaen-14-yl]-3,4,5,17,18,19-hexahydroxy-8,14-dioxo-9,13-dioxatricyclo[13.4.0.0^{2,7}]nonadeca-1(19),2,4,6,15,17-hexaen-11-yl] 3,4,5-trihydroxybenzoate

Identifiers
CAS Number	97775-88-7
3D model (JSmol)	Interactive image
ChemSpider	17300247
PubChem CID	101651021
- InChI: InChI=1S/C56H40O31/c57-18-2-1-12(3-20(18)59)47-27(66)6-14-19(58)10-21(60)32(48(14)84-47)35-34-36-33(44(74)46(76)45(34)75)31-17(9-26(65)40(70)43(31)73)55(80)87-51(50(35)86-56(36)81)49-28(83-52(77)13-4-22(61)37(67)23(62)5-13)11-82-53(78)15-7-24(63)38(68)41(71)29(15)30-16(54(79)85-49)8-25(64)39(69)42(30)72/h1-5,7-10,27-28,35,47,49-51,57-76H,6,11H2/t27?,28-,35-,47?,49-,50+,51?/m1/s1 Key: MRRHAYNXHYEUOD-KJJOKTLFSA-N
- SMILES: C1C(C(OC2=C1C(=CC(=C2C3C4C(OC(=O)C5=CC(=C(C(=C5C6=C(C3=C(C(=C6O)O)O)C(=O)O4)O)O)O)C7C(COC(=O)C8=CC(=C(C(=C8C9=C(C(=C(C=C9C(=O)O7)O)O)O)O)O)O)OC(=O)C1=CC(=C(C(=C1)O)O)O)O)O)C1=CC(=C(C=C1)O)O)O

Properties
Chemical formula	C_{42}H_{30}O_{25}
Molar mass	934,64 g/mol
- Except where otherwise noted, data are given for materials in their standard state (at 25 °C [77 °F], 100 kPa). verify (what is ?) Infobox references

Stenophyllanin A is an ellagitannin. It can be found in Cowania mexicana, Coleogyne ramosissima and Quercus stenophylla.
