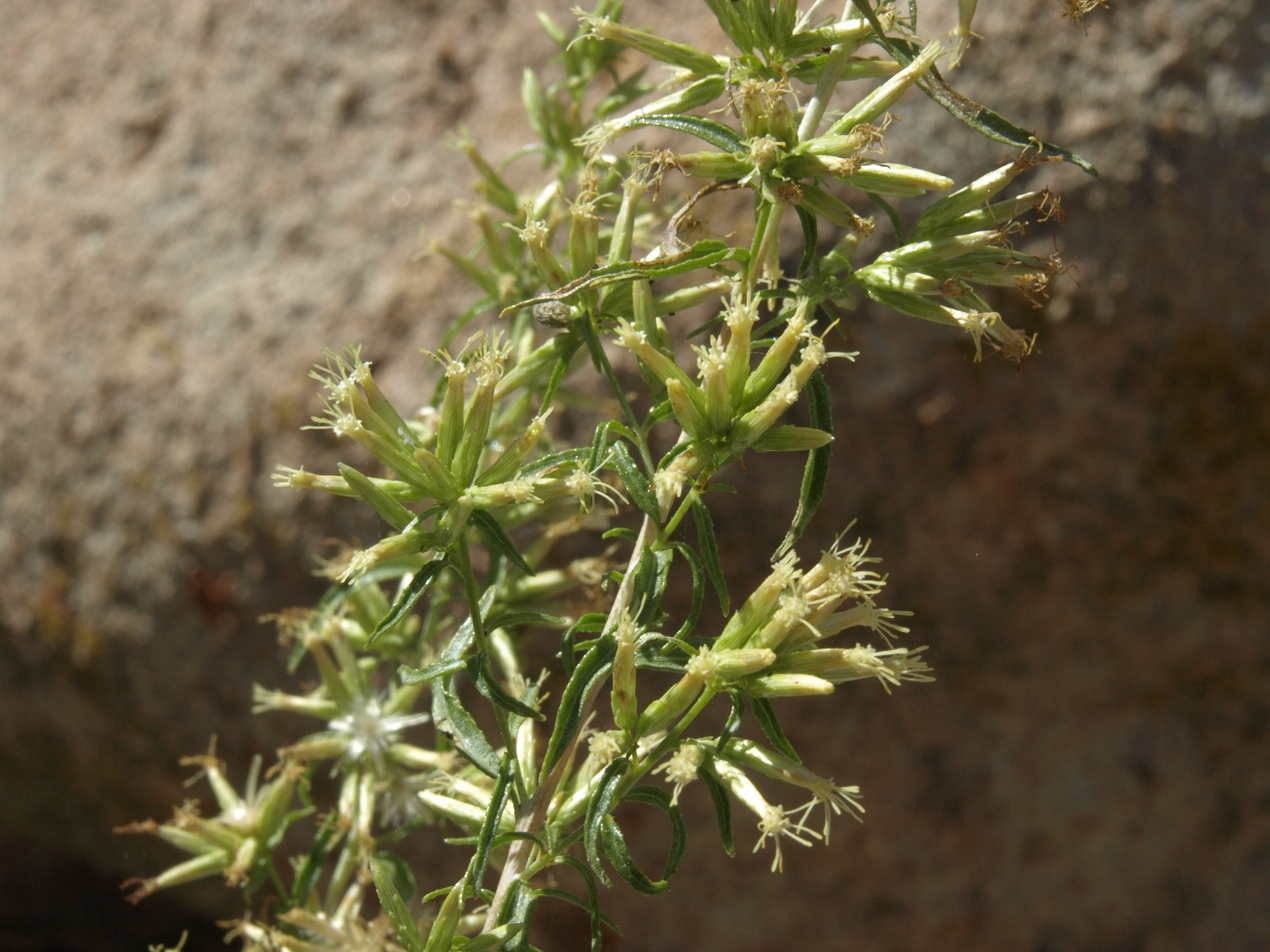

Conservation status
- Apparently Secure (NatureServe)

Scientific classification
- Kingdom: Plantae
- Clade: Tracheophytes
- Clade: Angiosperms
- Clade: Eudicots
- Clade: Asterids
- Order: Asterales
- Family: Asteraceae
- Genus: Brickellia
- Species: B. multiflora

Binomial name
- Brickellia multiflora S.Watson

Synonyms
- Brickellia longifolia var. multiflora (Kellogg) Cronquist; Coleosanthus multiflorus (Kellogg) Kuntze

= Brickellia multiflora =

Species of flowering plant

Brickellia multiflora, the longleaf brickellbush, is a shrub in the family Asteraceae. It is found in the Mojave Desert region of the southwestern United States, in Arizona, Nevada, and southern California.

Some authors classify this taxon as a variety of B. longifolia but others recognize it as a distinct species, B. multiflora.
