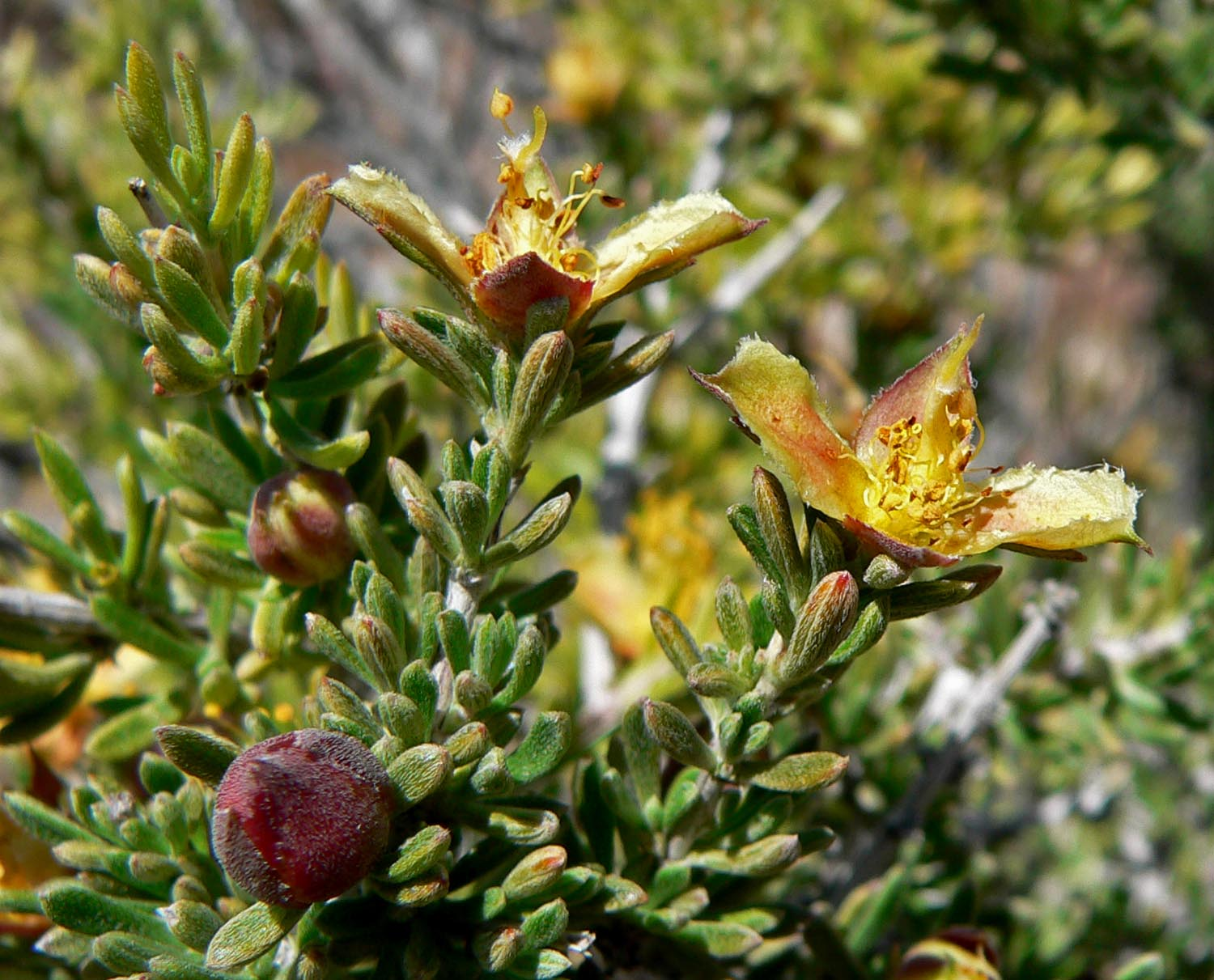

Scientific classification
- Kingdom: Plantae
- Clade: Embryophytes
- Clade: Tracheophytes
- Clade: Angiosperms
- Clade: Eudicots
- Clade: Rosids
- Order: Rosales
- Family: Rosaceae
- Subfamily: Amygdaloideae
- Tribe: Kerrieae
- Genus: Coleogyne; Torr.
- Species: C. ramosissima

Binomial name
- Coleogyne ramosissima Torr.

= Coleogyne =

Genus of flowering plants

Coleogyne ramosissima or blackbrush, is a low lying, dark grayish-green, aromatic, spiny, perennial, soft wooded shrub, native to the deserts of the southwestern United States. It is called blackbrush because the gray branches darken when wet by rains. It is in the rose family (Rosaceae) and is monotypic (the only species in its genus).

== Growth pattern ==
It has dense, intricate branches ("ramosissima" means "many branched"). Its dense branches form spiny tips. This plant forms vast pure stands across the desert floor and on scrubby slopes, giving the landscape a uniform dark-gray color. Vegetative types in which it dominates or is a codominate are called blackbrush scrub.

It drops most of its leaves and becomes dormant in conditions of severe dryness (drought-deciduous), but some leaves are usually retained at the end of the branches. The thickly branched plant forms thickets which may spread across the ground in clumps or grow erect to approach six feet in height in the Mojave Desert, and 4 feet in the Canyonlands desert region.

== Flowers ==
Flowers have 4 yellowish sepals, many yellow stamens, and may have 4 or no petals. It is atypical of members of the rose family in that the flowers have no petals, have four rather than five sepals, and the leaves are opposite (occur in pairs on the twig), rather than alternate (occurring one at a time going up the twig. The sepals may persist on the plant. It flowers between April and July.

== Leaves ==
The leaves are inversely lanceolate, up to 3/8" long, have a small point at the tip, and are arranged in opposite pairs along the stem, which is uncommon in members of the rose family.

It forms vast communities in the Canyonlands region, and in the Mojave Desert.

Flowering is triggered by heavy spring rain in this desert-adapted species. The leathery flowers grow at the ends of small stems. They are encased in thick, fuzzy sepals which are yellow inside and reddish or orange on the outer surface. There are no petals, but the sepals remain after the flower opens, surrounding the patch of whiskery stamens and the central pistil. The fruit is an achene a few millimeters long. The plant reproduces from seed, but very rarely. The seeds do not disperse well and seedlings do not survive in large numbers. A narrow range of temperature and moisture is required for the reproduction of this species, so it is sporadic, but the plants are hardy and long-lived.

Coleogyne ramosissima produces stenophyllanin A, an ellagitannin.
