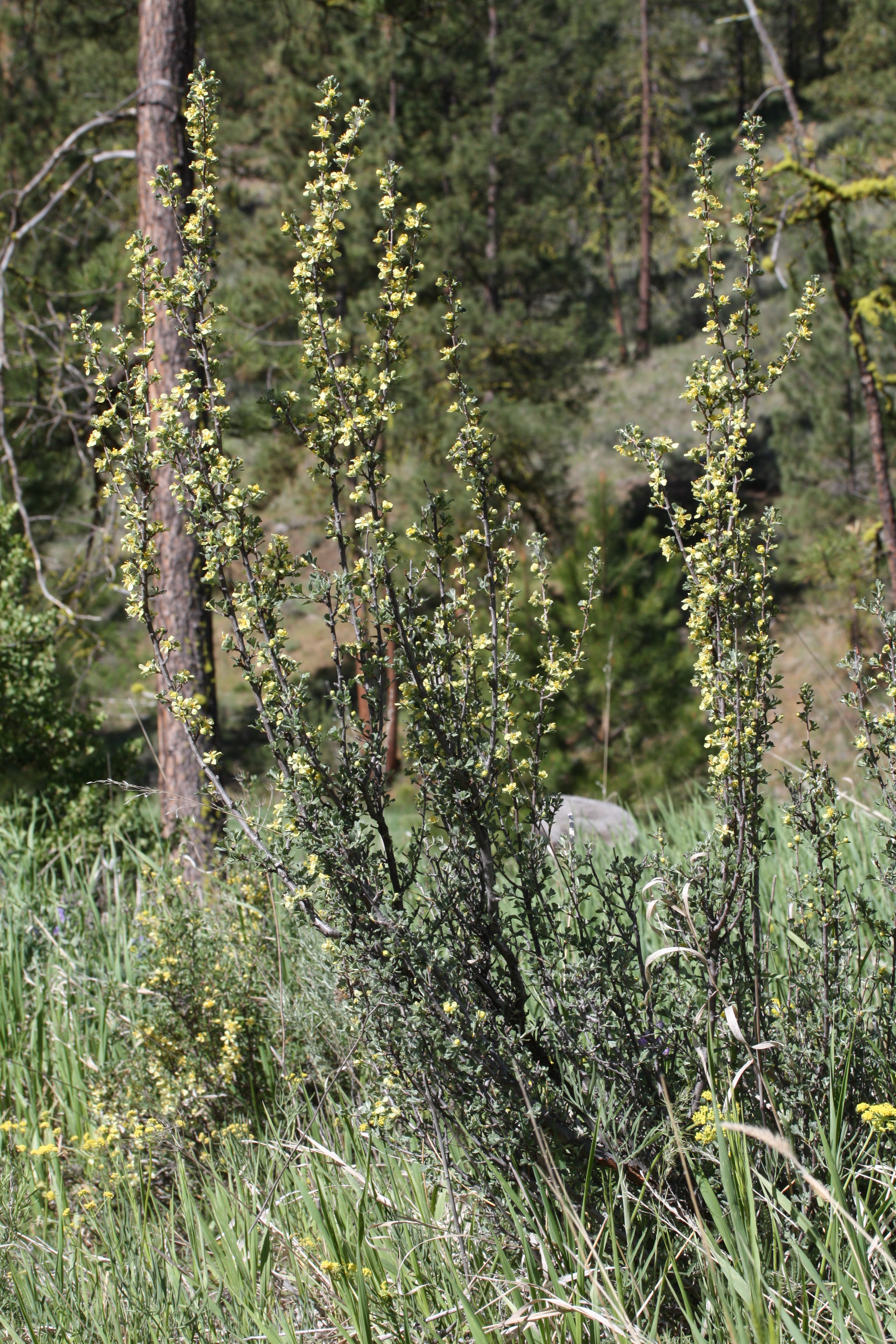
- Purshia tridentata, Wenas Wildlife Area

Conservation status
- Secure (NatureServe)

Scientific classification
- Kingdom: Plantae
- Clade: Tracheophytes
- Clade: Angiosperms
- Clade: Eudicots
- Clade: Rosids
- Order: Rosales
- Family: Rosaceae
- Genus: Purshia
- Species: P. tridentata

Binomial name
- Purshia tridentata (Pursh) DC.

Synonyms
- Kunzia tridentata (Pursh) Spreng.; Purshia tigarea F.Dietr., nom. illeg. superfl.; Tigarea tridentata Pursh

= Purshia tridentata =

Bitterbrush

Species of shrub

Purshia tridentata, with the common name bitterbrush, is a shrub in the genus Purshia of the family Rosaceae. It is native to mountainous areas of western North America.

Common names include antelope bitterbrush, antelope bush, buckbrush, quinine brush, and less commonly deerbrush, blackbrush, and greasewood. Some of these names are shared with other species.

== Description ==
Purshia tridentata is a deciduous shrub growing to a height of 1–5 metres (3 1/2–16 1/2 feet). It has many branches and slender green, three- to five-lobed leaves 5–20 millimetres (1/4–3/4 in) long. It is a nitrogen-fixing plant.

The flowers are pale yellow, with five petals 6–8 mm long, and darker yellow anthers. The fruit is a cluster of dry, slender, leathery achenes each up to 1 centimetre (1/2 in) long.

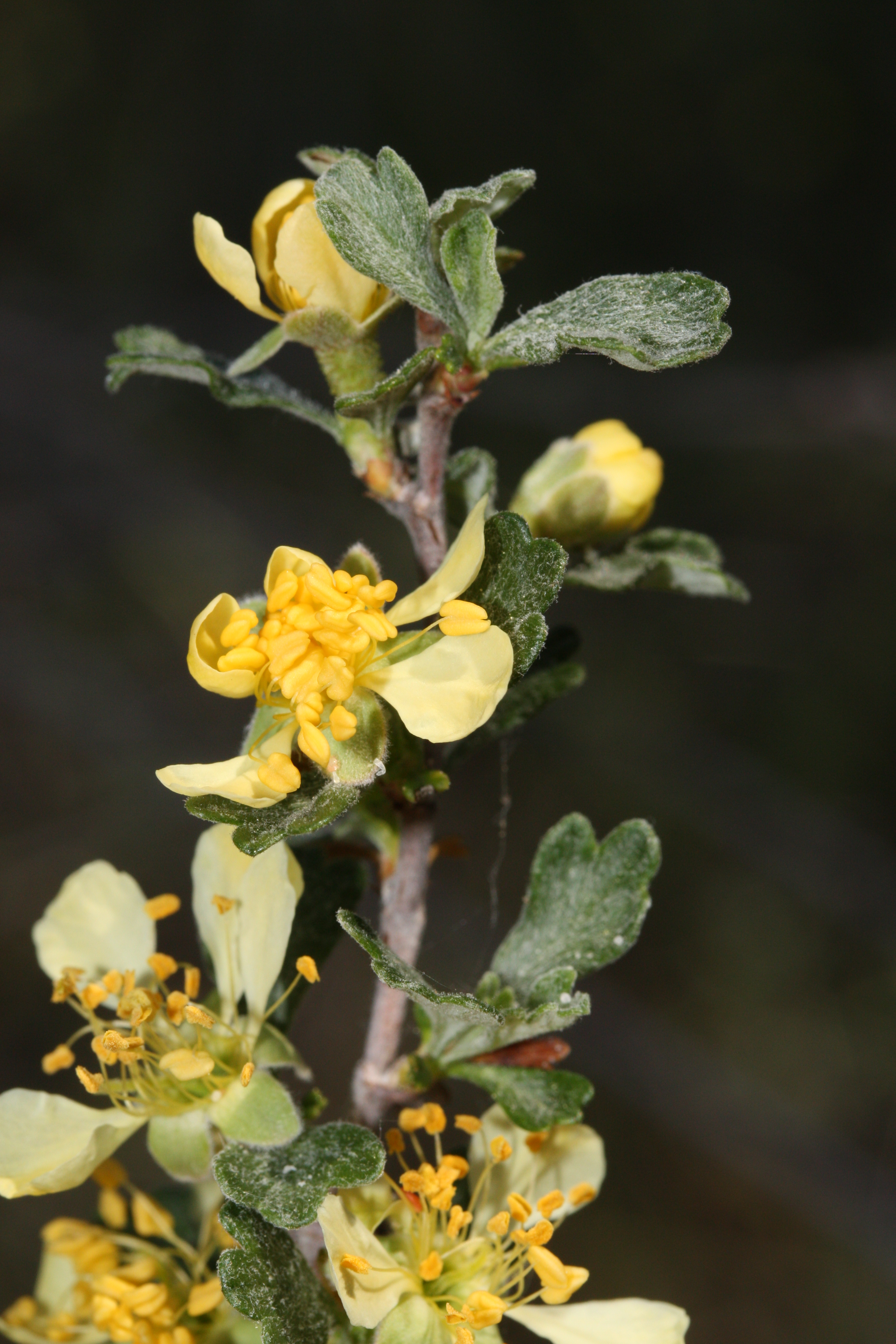
Flowers

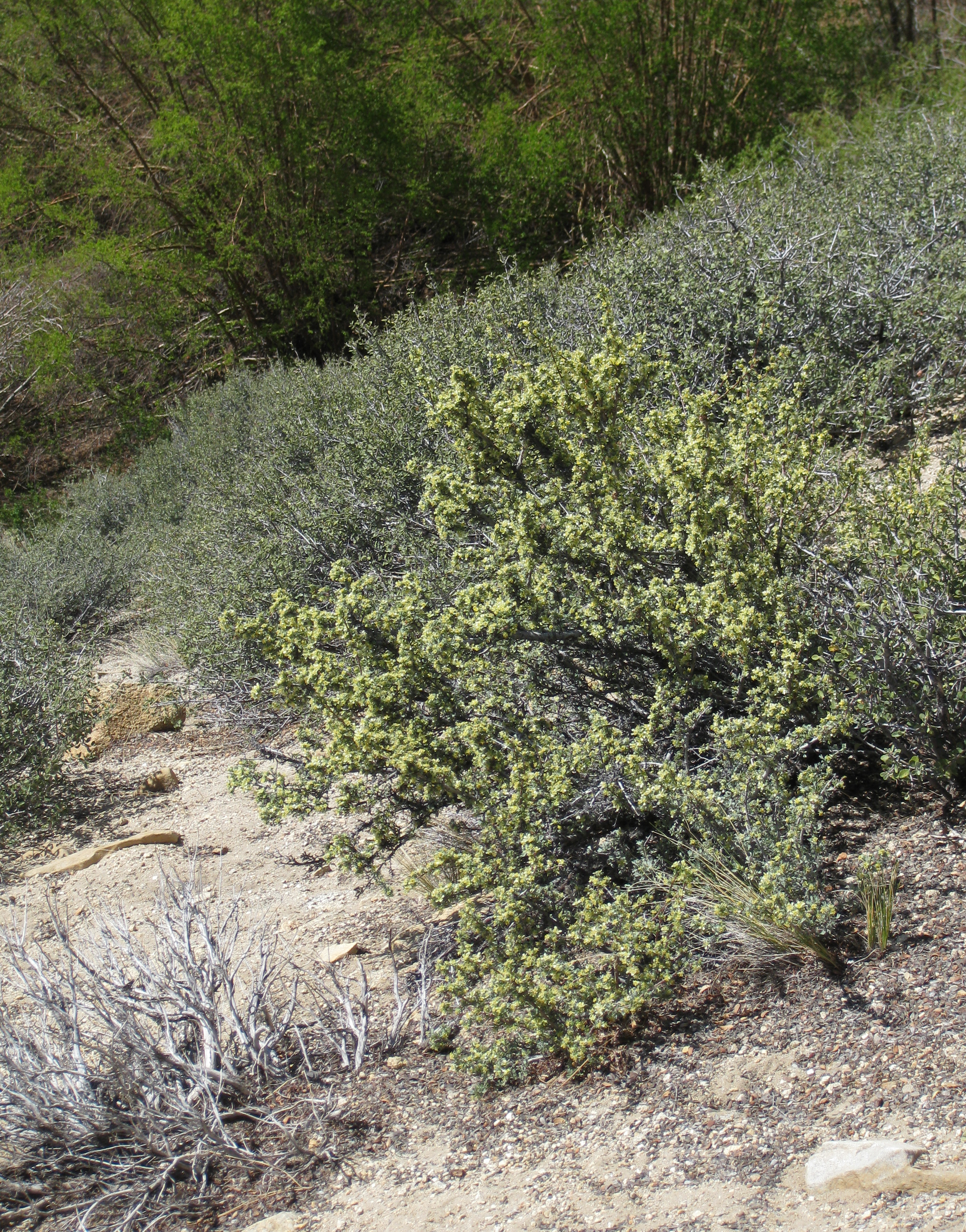
P. tridentata var. glandulosa on dry slope

=== Varieties ===
Some authorities name two varieties:

- Purshia tridentata var. glandulosa — Eastern Sierra Nevada, Southern California Plants of the World Online treats this variety as a distinct species, Purshia glandulosa.
- Purshia tridentata var. tridentata

== Distribution ==
The plant is found from southeastern British Columbia in the north, east to Montana and Wyoming, south to New Mexico, and west in California. It grows on arid mountainsides and slopes, as well as rocky or drained soils with somewhat more moisture than the sagebrush steppe. It is often associated with Balsamorhiza as well as Wyethia species, and in southern areas hybridizes with Purshia stansburyana.

In California it occurs between 700–3,400 m (2,300–11,200 ft) above sea level, including in the Peninsular Ranges, Transverse Ranges, and Sierra Nevada, and southern Cascade Range. Further north it occurs at lower elevations, such as at 320–1,065 m (1,050–3,494 ft) in British Columbia.

== Ecology ==
The shrub is an important forage plant for many game animals, including deer, especially during the winter.
