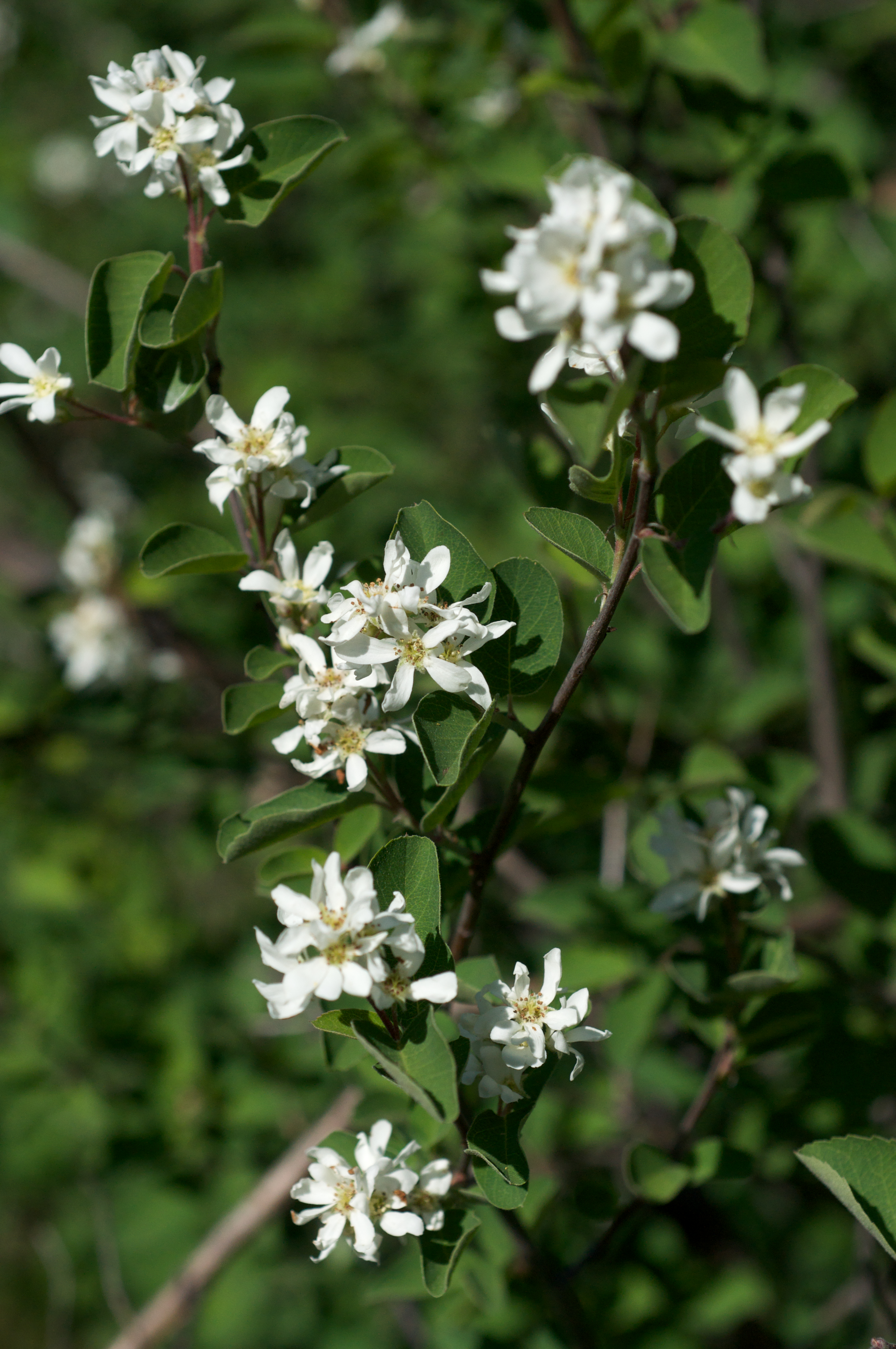

Conservation status
- Least Concern (IUCN 3.1)

- Secure (NatureServe)

Scientific classification
- Kingdom: Plantae
- Clade: Embryophytes
- Clade: Tracheophytes
- Clade: Spermatophytes
- Clade: Angiosperms
- Clade: Eudicots
- Clade: Rosids
- Order: Rosales
- Family: Rosaceae
- Genus: Amelanchier
- Species: A. utahensis

Binomial name
- Amelanchier utahensis Koehne
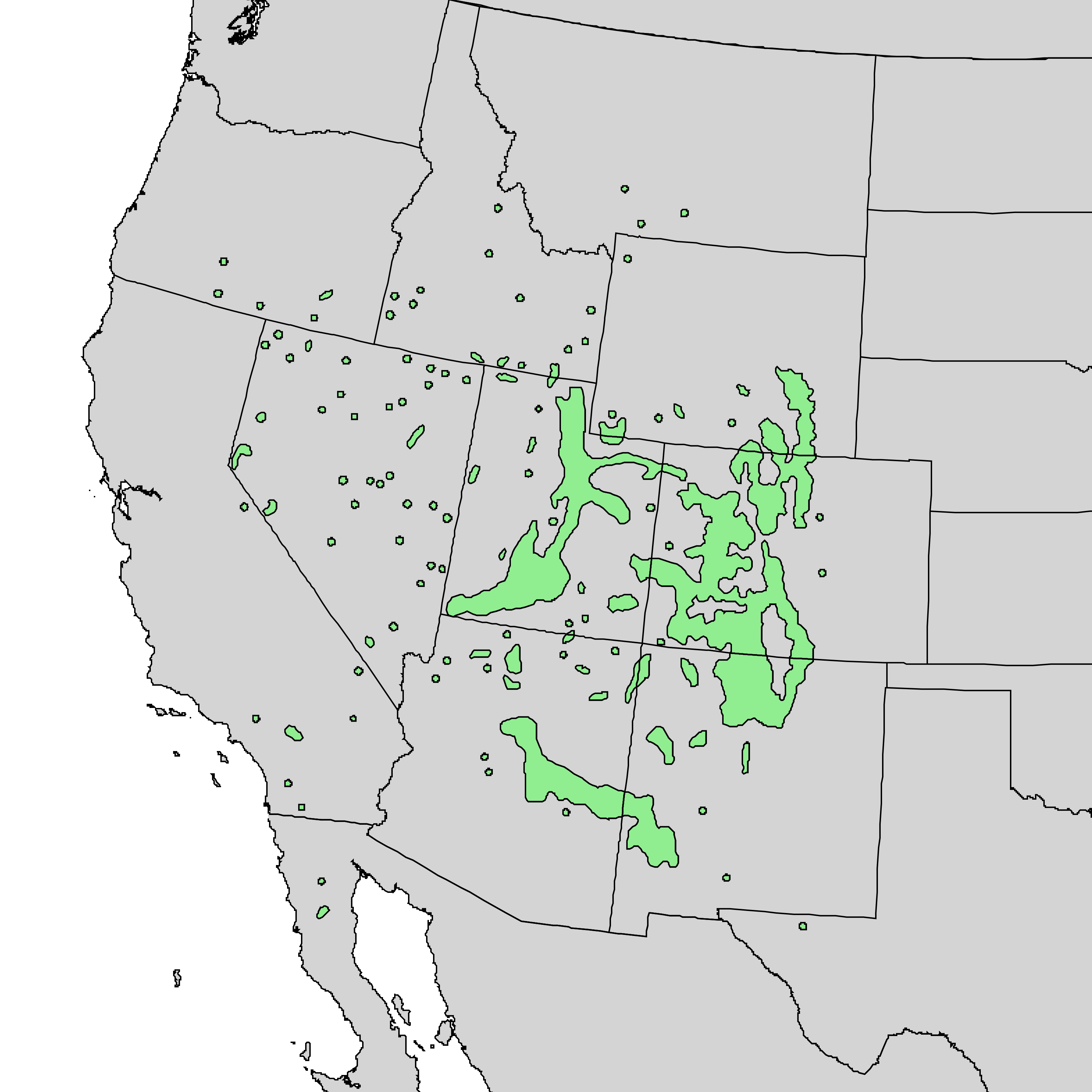
- Natural range of Amelanchier utahensis

= Amelanchier utahensis =

Utah serviceberry

Species of flowering plant

Amelanchier utahensis, the Utah serviceberry, is a species of serviceberry forming a shrub or small tree. It is native to western North America.

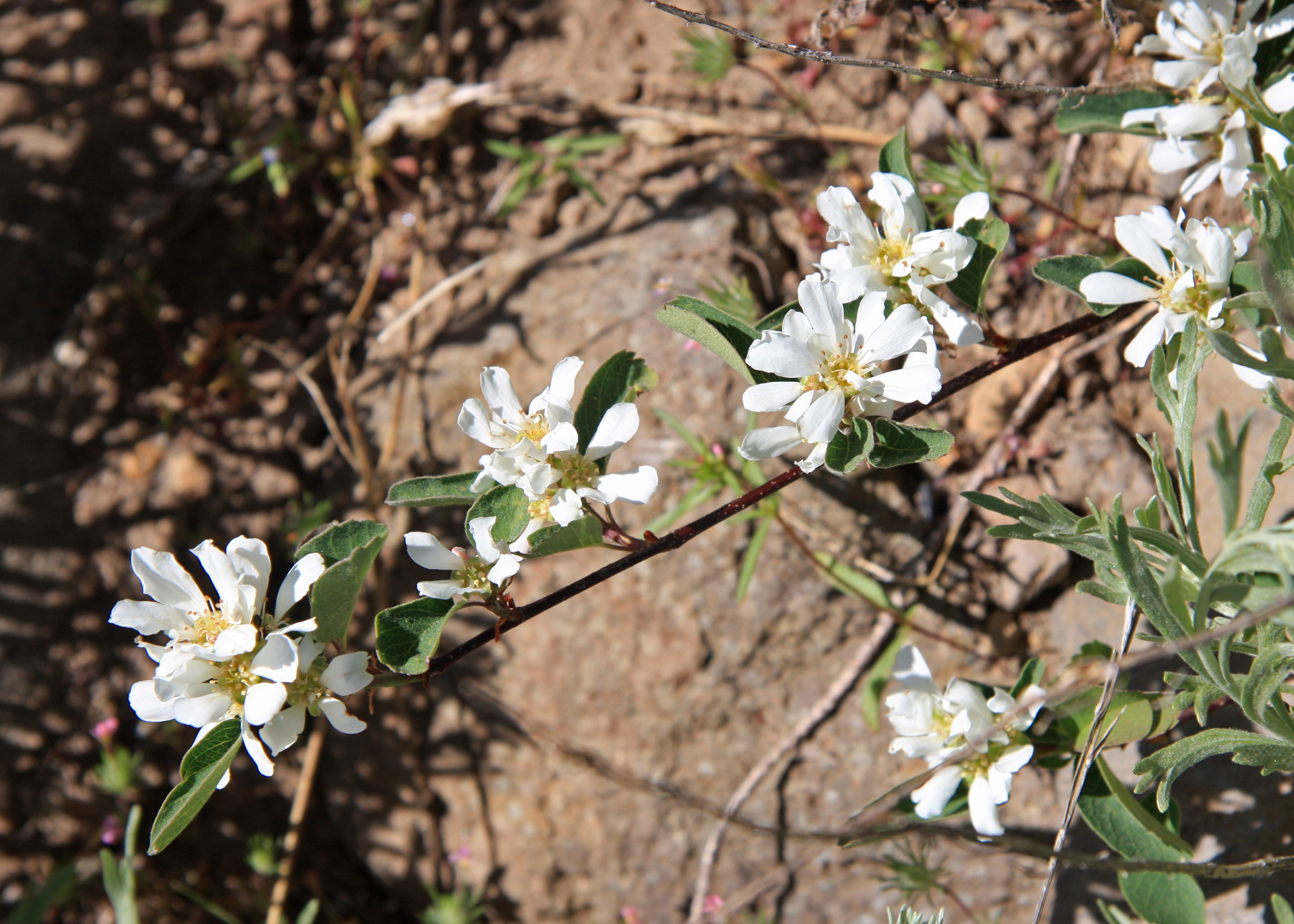
A. utahensis in high Sierra Nevada, California - flower clusters on short racemes; leaves elliptical, toothed above middle

== Description ==
Amelanchier utahensis is a spreading plant, reaching a maximum of 3.2 meters (10 feet) in height. It is deciduous, bearing rounded or spade-shaped often toothed green leaves 1–2.5 centimetres (1/2–1 in) long; these fall in autumn.

In mid-spring the shrub blooms short inflorescences of white flowers, each with five widely spaced, 1-cm-long, narrow petals. The fruits are 1-cm-long purplish pomes.

== Distribution and habitat ==
The core mountainous range of the species is delimited by the Colorado–New Mexico–Wyoming Rocky Mountains in the east, the Front ranges of Utah at the west, and the Mogollon Rim and White Mountains region of central-east Arizona and western New Mexico to the south.

The rest of the range is centered on mountain ranges of the Great Basin, and extending west to the Sierra Nevada and chaparral and woodlands in California and as far south as extreme northern Baja California, and in the north to Oregon, Washington, Idaho, and southwestern Montana.

It grows in varied habitats, from scrubby open slopes to woodlands and forests.

== Ecology ==
The Utah serviceberry is generally fire tolerant and sprouts from the root crown when damaged by fire. The tree also has a high resistance to drought and high fruit abundance. Additionally, it is not susceptible to frost.

The plant is browsed by desert bighorns, elk, and mule deer, as well as many birds and domesticated livestock.

== Uses ==
The berries are edible but insipid in flavor.
