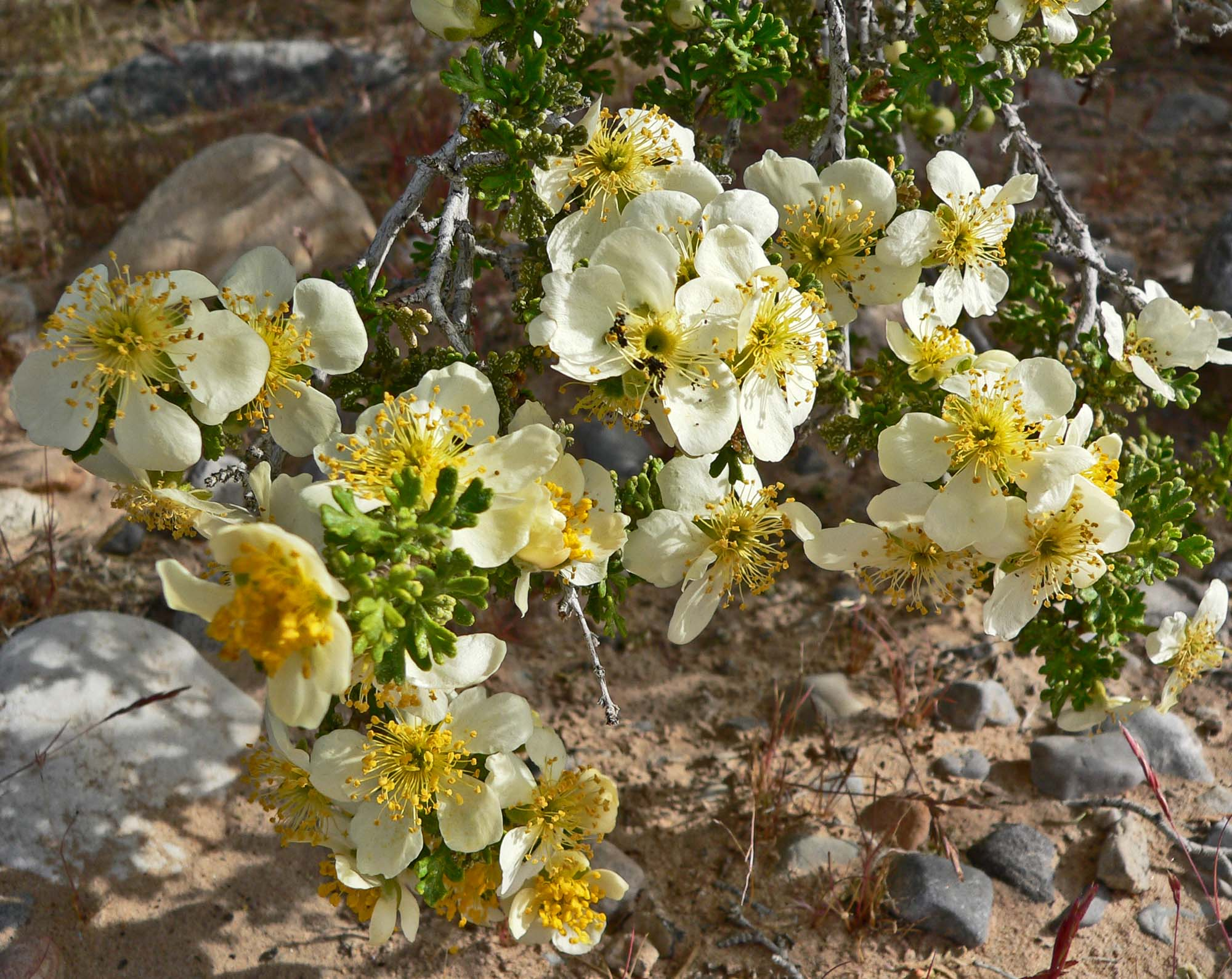
- Purshia stansburyana

Scientific classification
- Kingdom: Plantae
- Clade: Tracheophytes
- Clade: Angiosperms
- Clade: Eudicots
- Clade: Rosids
- Order: Rosales
- Family: Rosaceae
- Subfamily: Dryadoideae
- Genus: Purshia; DC. ex Poir.

Type species
- Purshia tridentata
- Range

Synonyms
- Cowania D.Don ex Tilloch & Taylor; Greggia Engelm.; Kunzia Spreng.; Purschia T.Post & Kuntze, orth. var.

= Purshia =

Genus of flowering plants

Purshia (bitterbrush or cliff-rose) is a small genus of 5–8 species of flowering plants in the family Rosaceae which are native to western North America.

== Description ==
Purshia species form deciduous or evergreen shrubs, typically reaching 0.3–5 metres (1–16 1/2 feet) tall. The leaves are 1–3 centimetres (1/2–1 1/4 inches) long, deeply three- to five-lobed, with revolute margins. The flowers are 1–2 cm in diameter, with five white to pale yellow or pink petals and yellow stamens. The fruit is a cluster of dry, slender, leathery achenes which are 2–6 cm long. The roots have nodules that host nitrogen-fixing Frankia bacterium.

== Taxonomy ==
=== Taxonomic history ===
The genus was originally placed in the subfamily Rosoideae. In the past, the evergreen species were treated separately in the genus Cowania; this genus is still accepted by some botanists.

=== Modern classification ===
The classification of Purshia within the family Rosaceae has been unclear. It is now placed in the subfamily Dryadoideae.

=== Species ===
Purshia comprises the following species:

- Purshia ericifolia (Torr. ex A.Gray) Henrickson – Heath cliffrose (Texas)
- Purshia glandulosa Curran – Desert bitterbrush (Nevada, Utah, Arizona)
- Purshia mexicana (D.Don) S.L.Welsh – Mexican cliffrose (Mexico, Arizona)
- Purshia plicata (D.Don) Henrickson (syn. Cowania plicata) – Antelope bush (Nuevo León, Mexico).
- Purshia stansburyana (Torr.) Henrickson – Stansbury cliffrose (Idaho south to California, Arizona and New Mexico)
- Purshia subintegra (Kearney) Henrickson – Arizona
- Purshia tridentata (Pursh) DC. – Antelope bitterbrush (British Columbia south to California and New Mexico)

== Distribution and habitat ==
The genus is native to western North America, where the species grow in dry climates from southeast British Columbia, Canada, south throughout the western United States to northern Mexico.

== Gallery ==
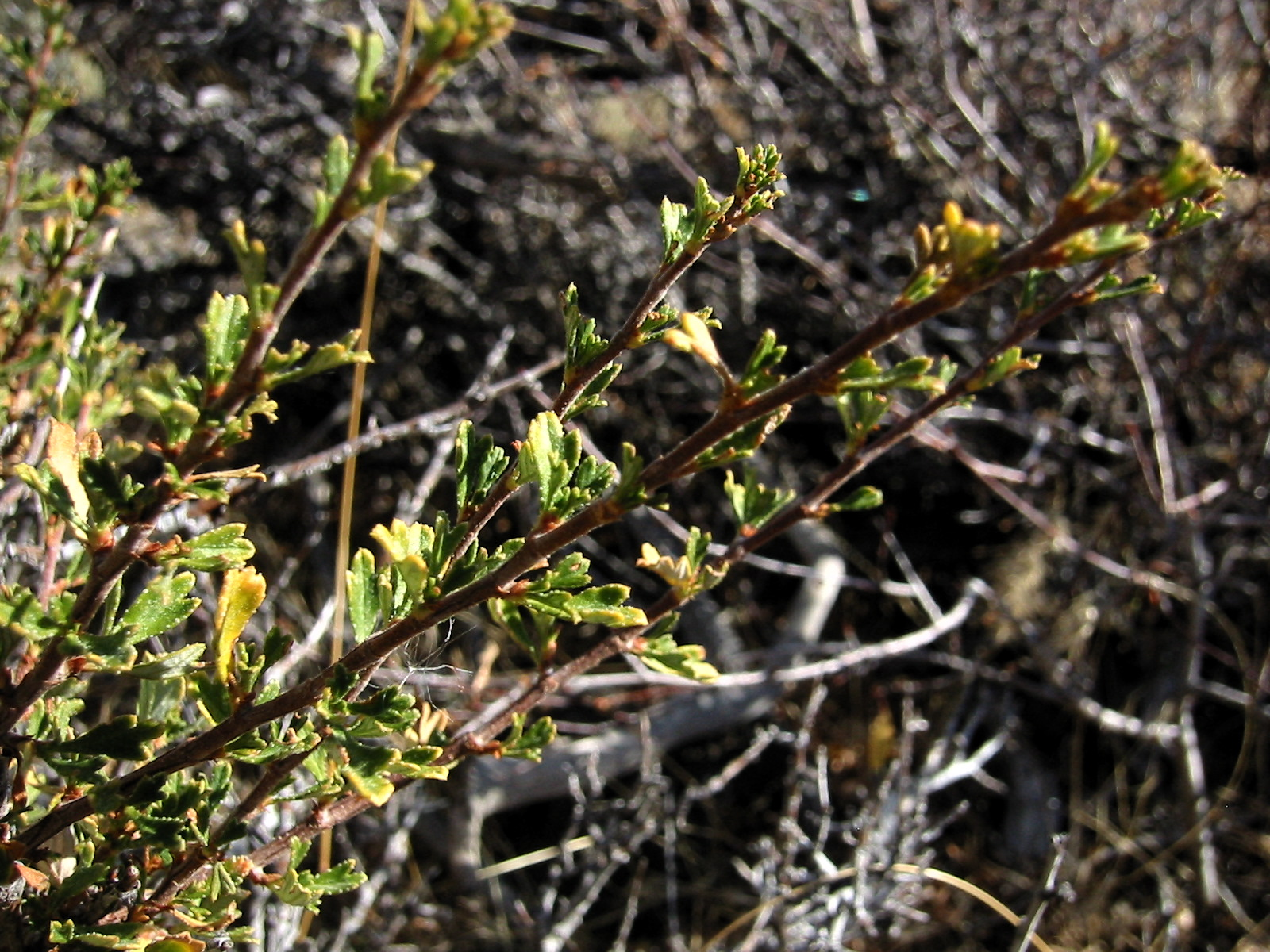
P. tridentata, Lava Beds National Monument

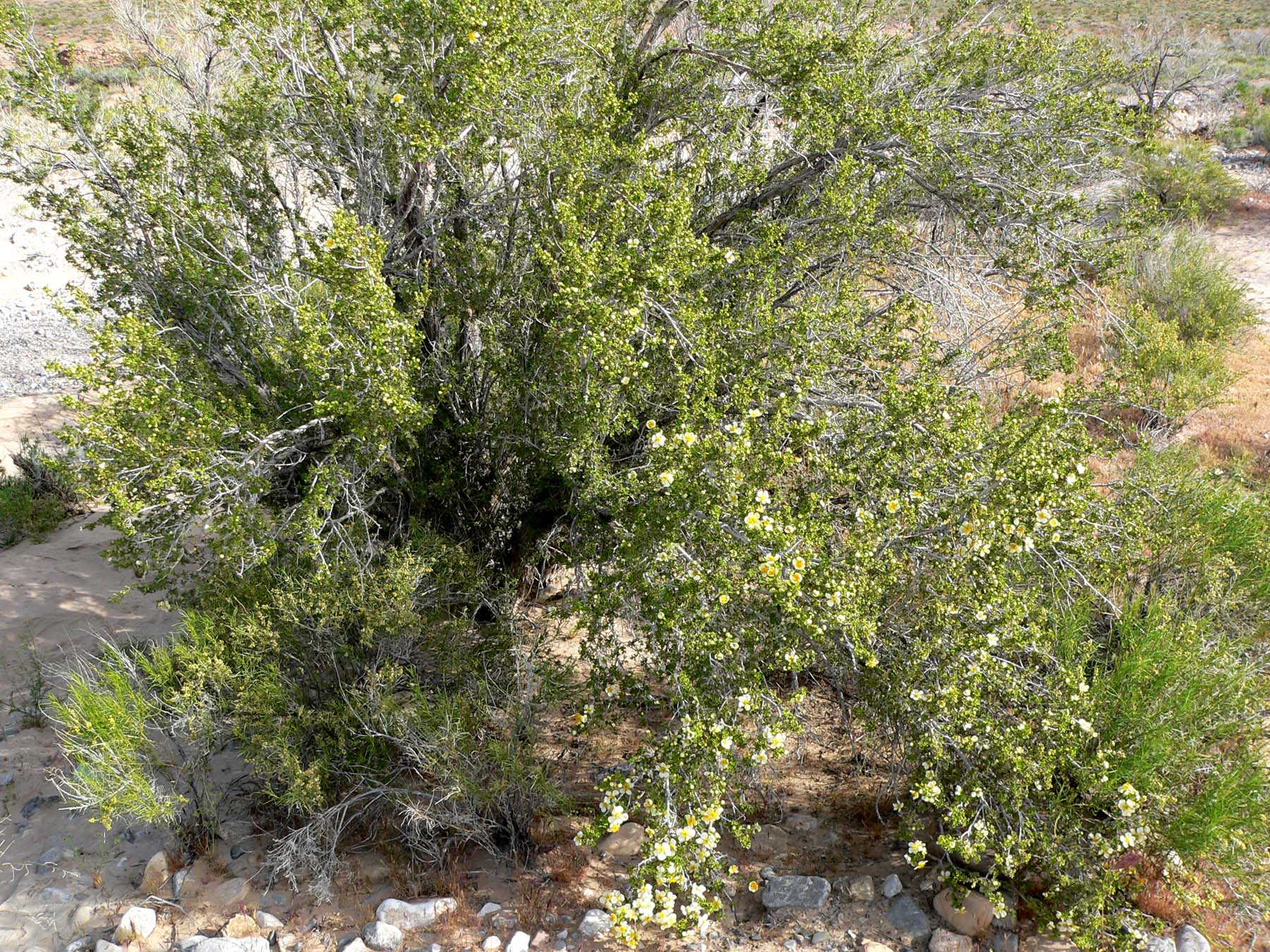
P. stansburyana, Red Rock Canyon, Nevada

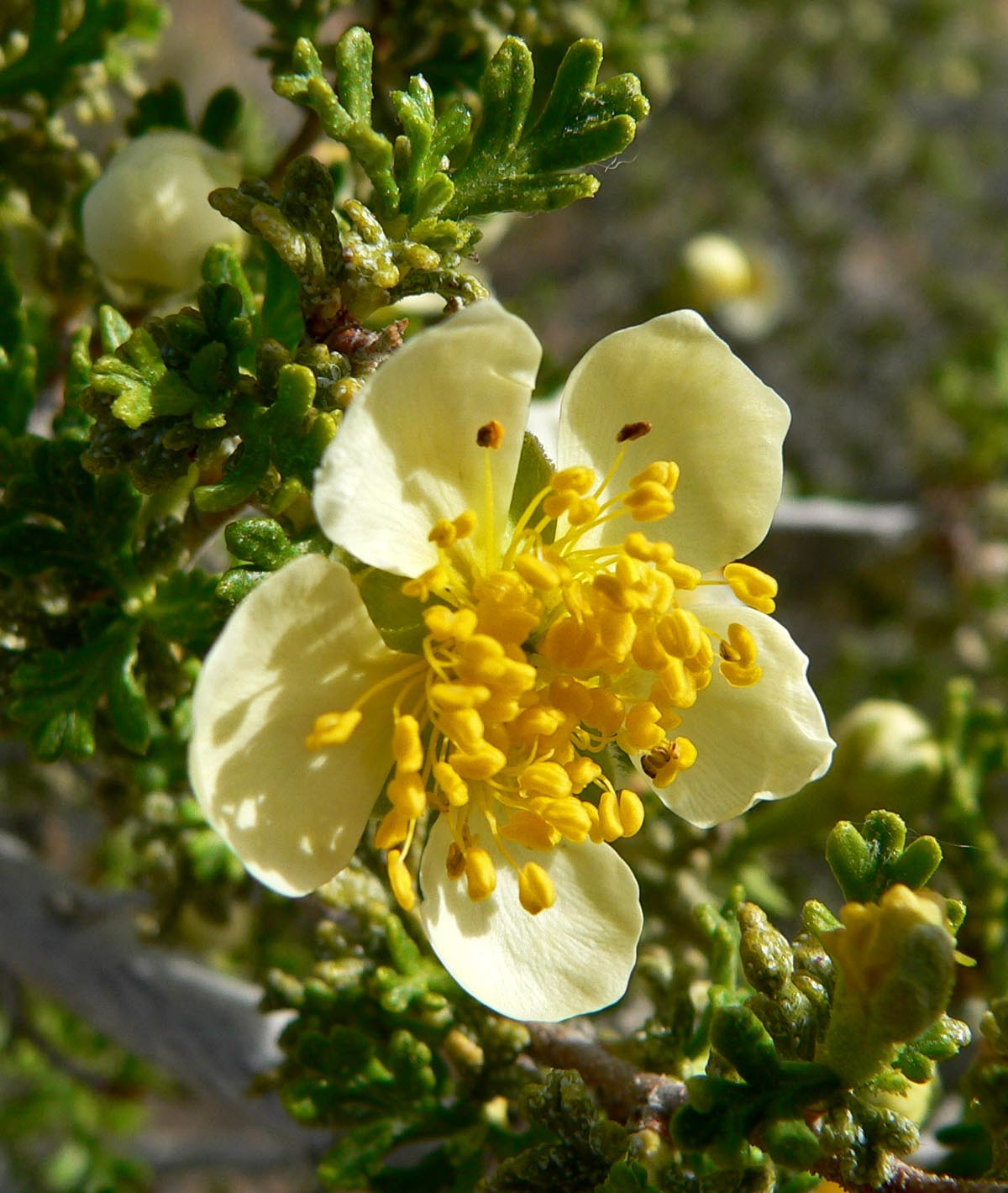
P. stansburyana, Red Rock Canyon, Nevada
