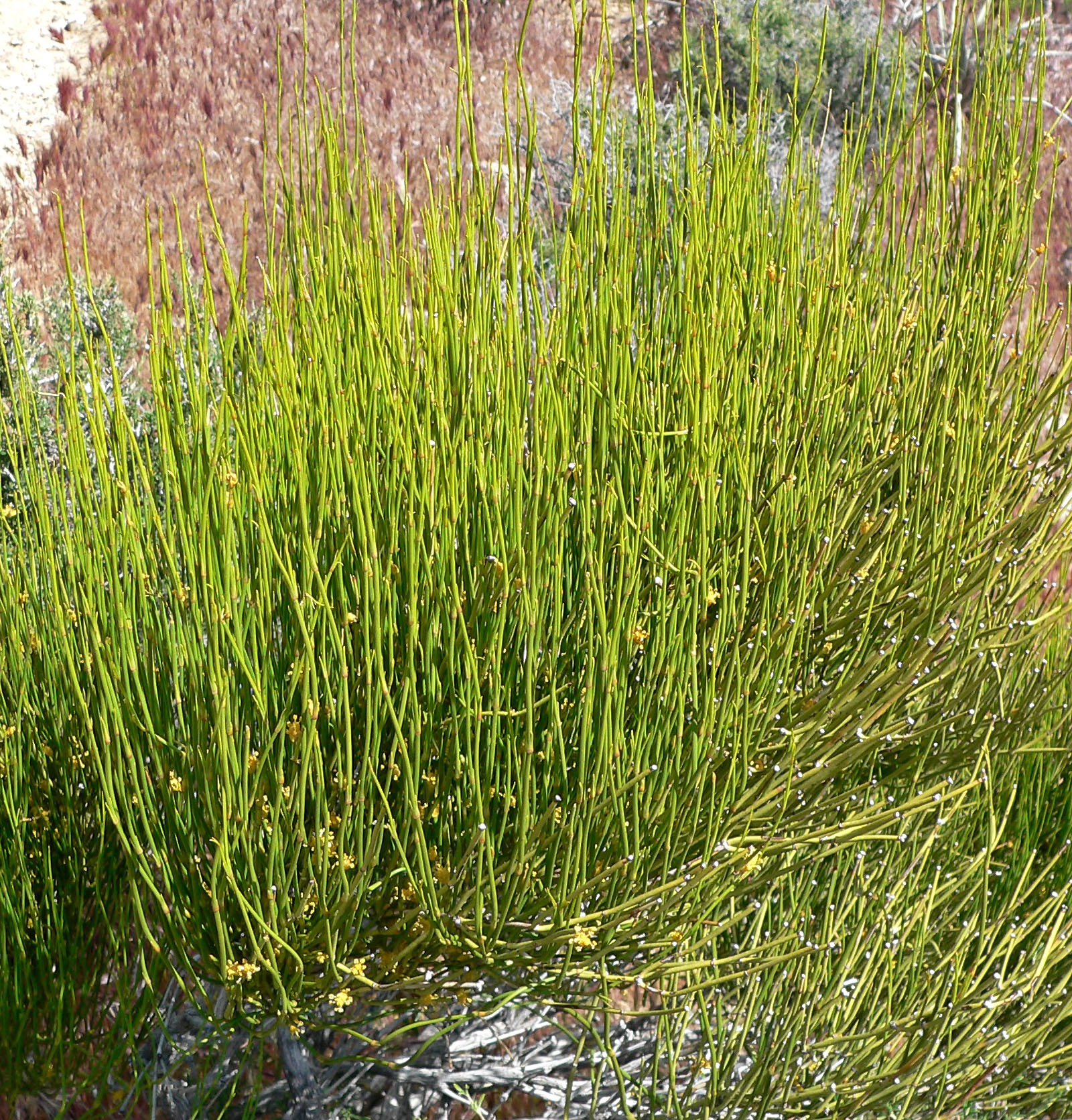
- Ephedra viridis
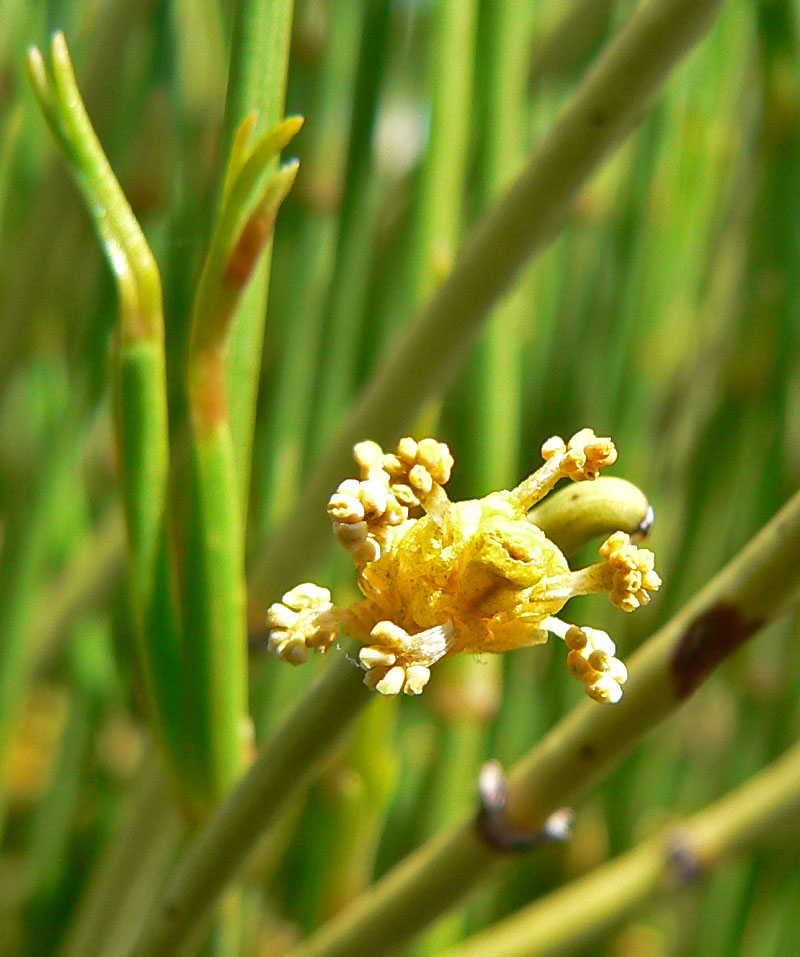
- Ephedra viridis: pollen cone

Conservation status
- Secure (NatureServe)

Scientific classification
- Kingdom: Plantae
- Clade: Tracheophytes
- Clade: Gymnosperms
- Division: Pinophyta
- Class: Pinopsida
- Subclass: Gnetidae
- Order: Ephedrales
- Family: Ephedraceae
- Genus: Ephedra
- Species: E. viridis

Binomial name
- Ephedra viridis Coville

= Ephedra viridis =

Species of seed-bearing shrub

Ephedra viridis, known by the common names green Mormon tea, Brigham tea, green ephedra, and Indian tea, is a species of Ephedra. It is indigenous to the Western United States, where it is a member of varied scrub, woodland, desert, and open habitats. It grows at 900–2,300 metres (3,000–7,500 ft) elevations.

== Description ==
The Ephedra viridis shrub is woody below, topped with many dense clusters of erect bright green twigs. They may yellow somewhat with age.

Nodes along the twigs are marked by the tiny pairs of vestigial leaves, which start out reddish but soon dry to brown or black. The stems are green and photosynthetic.

Male plants produce pollen cones at the nodes, each under a centimeter long with protruding yellowish sporangiophores. Female plants produce seed cones which are slightly larger and contain two seeds each.

== Chemistry ==
Information about the chemistry of this species is contradictory. James D. Adams, Jr. and Cecilia Garcia claim it contains no ephedrine, but that it does contain pseudoephedrine. However, a gas chromatograph analysis of samples conducted by Richard F. Keeler found no measurable amount of ephedrine, pseudoephedrine, norephedrine, or norpseudoephedrine. The toxic symptoms found in his study were consistent with a high tannin content rather than with alkaloid poisoning.

== Uses ==
A tea can be made by boiling the stems, hence the common name, "green Mormon tea".

The plant is used medicinally by both Native Americans and the ancient Chinese (using their own local species of the genus) to treat various afflictions including sexually transmitted diseases such as gonorrhea and syphilis, kidney diseases, and complications with menstruation. Native American tribes such as the Shoshone and Paiute boil tea using the stem of the plant and combined it with the bark of Purshia tridentata, another shrub.

The Navajo have used the plant as a dye solution to produce a yellowish-green color on woolen rugs, whereas other species can produce a light tan or reddish dye.

In modern medicine, the plant is used to treat sinus illnesses such as hay fever, common colds, and sinusitis. This use is supported by clinical trials, as it is a treatment for bronchial asthma.

Because the plant can be used as an appetite suppressant, it is used illegally by some athletes to lose weight and build muscle.

Because it is toxic, the plant should not be ingested without a doctor’s recommendation.
