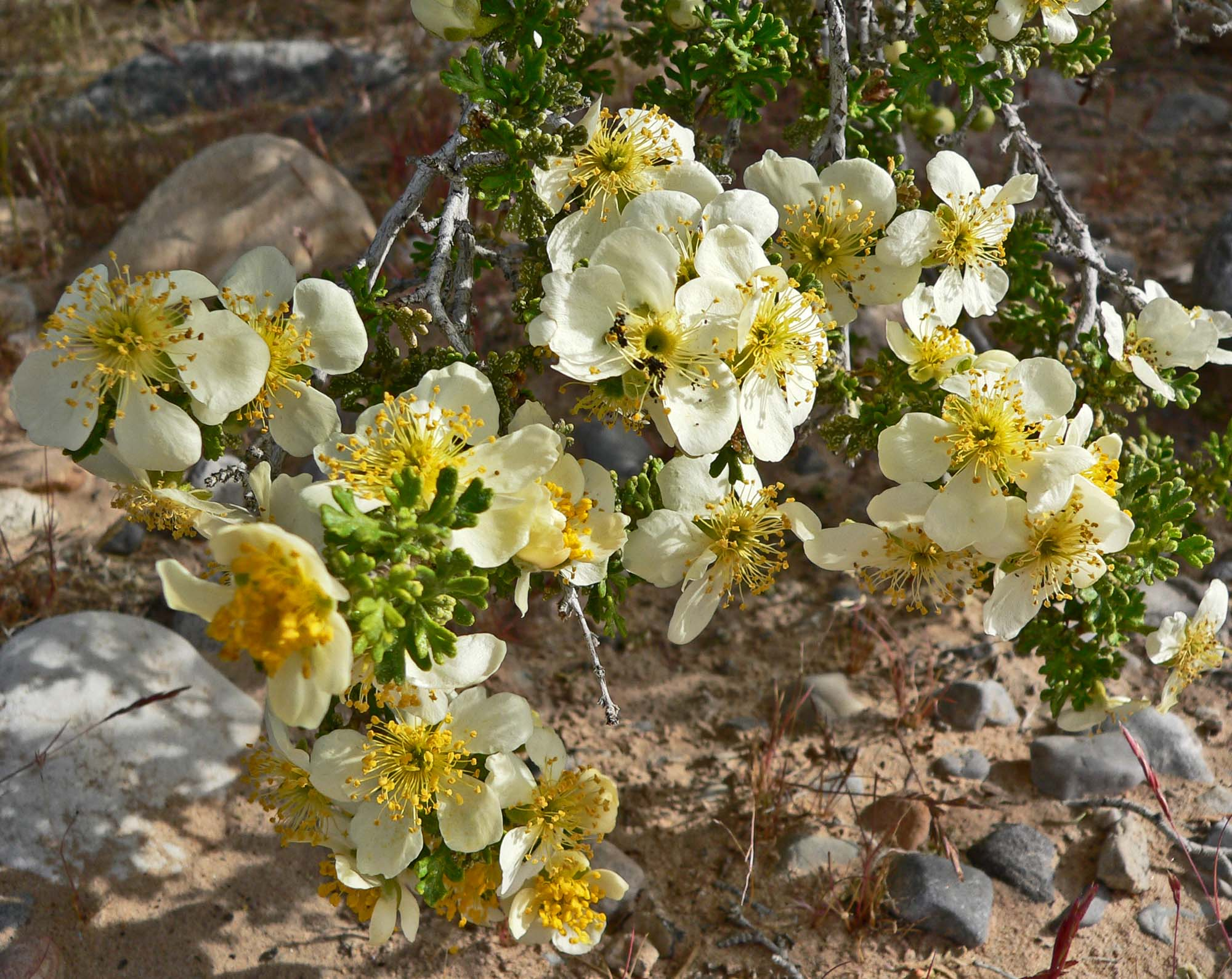

Conservation status
- Least Concern (IUCN 3.1)

- Secure (NatureServe)

Scientific classification
- Kingdom: Plantae
- Clade: Tracheophytes
- Clade: Angiosperms
- Clade: Eudicots
- Clade: Rosids
- Order: Rosales
- Family: Rosaceae
- Genus: Purshia
- Species: P. stansburyana

Binomial name
- Purshia stansburyana (Torr.) Henrickson

Synonyms
- Cowania alba Goodd.; Cowania mexicana var. stansburyana (Torr.) Jeps.; Cowania mexicana subsp. stansburyana (Torr.) A.E.Murray; Cowania stansburyana Torr.; Purshia alba (Goodd.) E.I.Golubk.; Purshia mexicana var. stansburyana (Torr) S.L.Welsh

= Purshia stansburyana =

Species of flowering plant

Purshia stansburyana is a species of flowering plant in the rose family known by the common name Stansbury's cliffrose. It is native to the southwestern United States and northern Mexico, where it grows in woodlands, desert, and plateau habitat. It often grows anchored on cliffs and prefers rocky, granular soils, especially limestone.

== Orthography ==
The species name was originally spelled P. stansburiana, but due to a 2006 rule change under the ICBN, the last letter has been restored since the plant was named in honor of Howard Stansbury.

== Description ==
Purshia stansburyana is a shrub generally growing up to about one to three meters tall, known to approach 4 meters to up to 8 meters in exceptional circumstances, becoming somewhat treelike. It easily hybridizes with other Purshia species. It is covered in shreddy bark. The small, very thick, glandular leaves are divided into several lobes which may be divided into sub-lobes. The leaves on the upper side are dotted, i.e. are punctate. The shrub blooms abundantly in white or cream-colored flowers with clawed petals; flowers are strongly and sweetly fragrant. Blooming continues from spring until the first frost. The fruit is an achene, a long plumelike structure up to 6 centimeters long. The plume is dispersed on the wind and by animals such as rodents. The shrub is drought-tolerant and the seedlings may actually survive better in years of below average precipitation.

== Uses ==
The Stansbury's cliffrose shrub provides valuable browse for many wild ungulates, including elk, mule deer, and desert bighorn sheep, as well as livestock. Many birds and rodents consume the seeds, with rodents caching them underground, where they may sprout later.

It is used for revegetation projects in degraded habitat in its native region, and as an ornamental. It was used by Native American groups for a variety of purposes, the bark being worked into fiber for clothing, bedding, and rope, and the branches being made into arrows.
