= Great Basin Desert =

Desert in the western United States

Central Basin and Range Great Basin shrub steppe
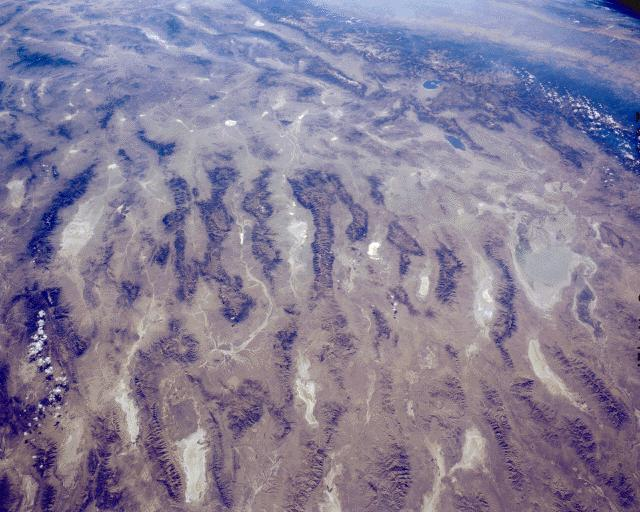
- Central Basin and Range from space (central-west Nevada region, view due-south)

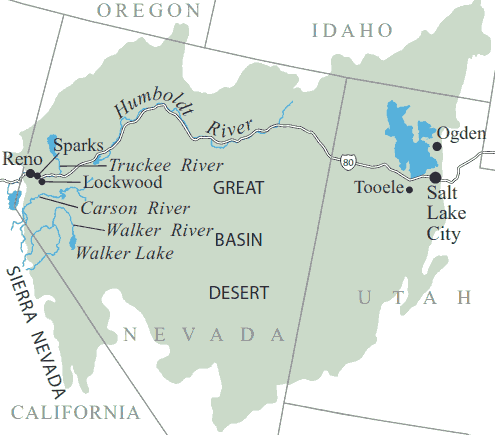
- The Great Basin Desert, as marked on a map by the USGS

Ecology
- Realm: Nearctic
- Biome: Deserts and xeric shrublands
- Borders: Northern Basin and Range (ecoregion) (80); Sierra Nevada (ecoregion) (5); Wasatch and Uinta Mountains (ecoregion) (19)
- Bird species: 204
- Mammal species: 105

Geography
- Country: United States
- States: Nevada; Utah; California; Idaho; Oregon
- Climate type: Cold desert (BWk) and cold semi-arid (BSk)

Conservation
- Habitat loss: 90%
- Protected: 76.62%

The Great Basin Desert is part of the Great Basin between the Sierra Nevada and the Wasatch Range in the western United States. The desert is a geographical region that largely overlaps the Great Basin shrub steppe defined by the World Wildlife Fund, and the Central Basin and Range ecoregion defined by the U.S. Environmental Protection Agency and United States Geological Survey. It is a temperate desert with hot, dry summers and snowy winters. The desert spans large portions of Nevada and Utah, and extends into eastern California. The desert is one of the four biologically defined deserts in North America, in addition to the Mojave, Sonoran, and Chihuahuan Deserts.

Basin and range topography characterizes the desert: wide valleys bordered by parallel mountain ranges generally oriented north–south. There are more than 33 peaks within the desert with summits higher than 9,800 feet (3,000 m), but valleys in the region are also high, most with elevations above 3,900 feet (1,200 m). The biological communities of the Great Basin Desert vary according to altitude: from low salty dry lakes, up through rolling sagebrush valleys, to pinyon-juniper forests. The significant variation between valleys and peaks has created a variety of habitat niches which has in turn led to many small, isolated populations of genetically unique plant and animal species throughout the region. According to Grayson, more than 600 species of vertebrates live in the floristic Great Basin, which has a similar areal footprint to the ecoregion. Sixty-three of these species have been identified as species of conservation concern due to contracting natural habitats (for example, Centrocercus urophasianus, Vulpes macrotis, Dipodomys ordii, and Phrynosoma platyrhinos).

The ecology of the desert varies across geography also. The desert's high elevation and location between mountain ranges influences regional climate: the desert formed by the rain shadow of the Sierra Nevada that blocks moisture from the Pacific Ocean, while the Rocky Mountains create a barrier effect that restricts moisture from the Gulf of Mexico. Different locations in the desert have different amounts of precipitation depending on the strength of these rain shadows. The environment is influenced by Pleistocene lakes that dried after the last ice age: Lake Lahontan and Lake Bonneville. Each of these lakes left different amounts of salinity and alkalinity.

== Definition and boundaries ==
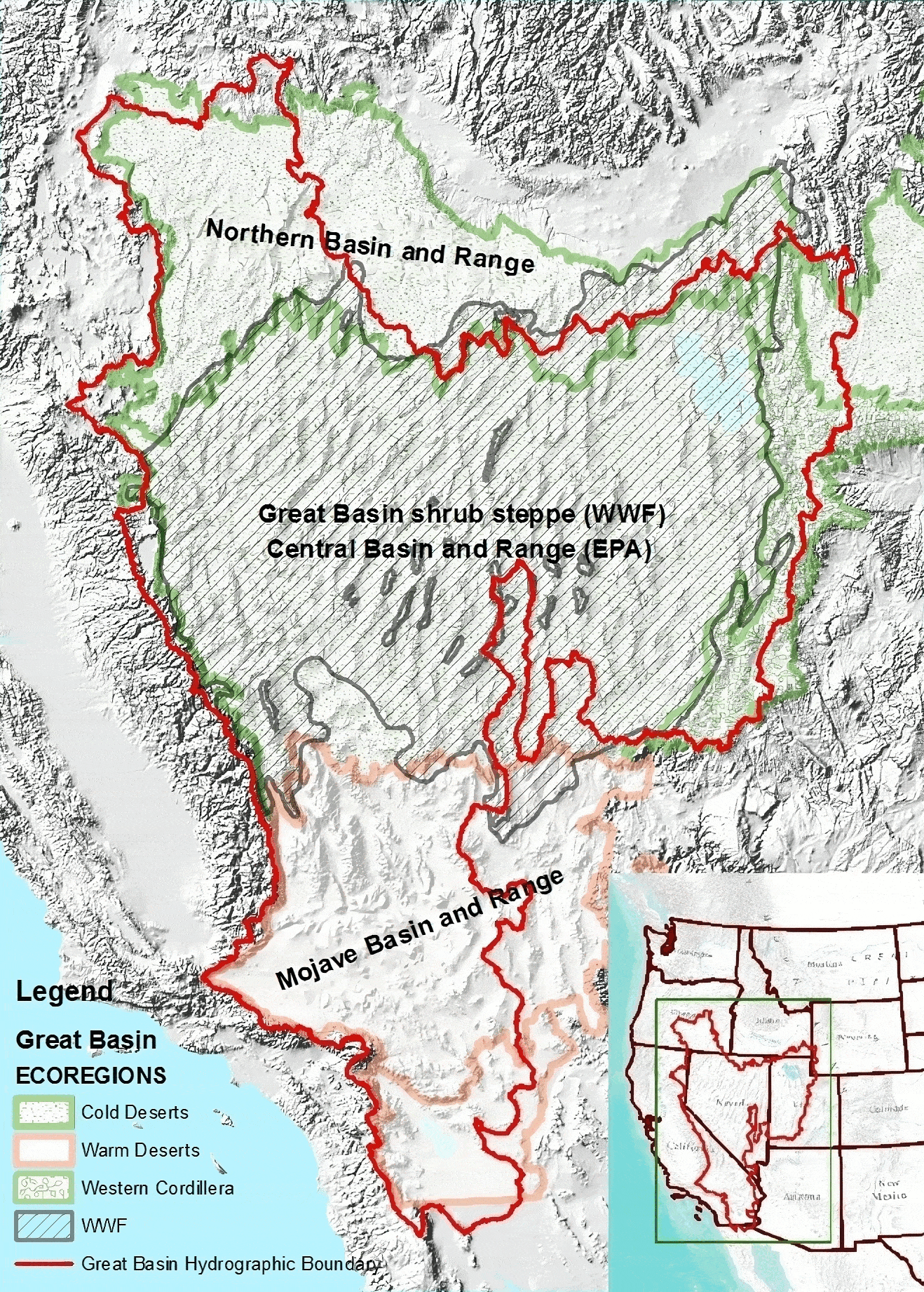
Ecoregions as currently delineated by the Environmental Protection Agency and World Wildlife Fund

The Great Basin Desert is defined by its animals and plants, yet the boundaries are unclear.

Scientists have different definitions of the Great Basin Desert, which are often defined by negatives. J. Robert Macey defines the "Great Basin scrub desert as lacking creosote bush." The Great Basin Desert includes several arid basins lacking Larrea tridentata (chaparral) such as the "Chalfant, Hammil, Benton, and Queen valleys," as well as all but the southeast portion of the Owens Valley. Conversely, the "Panamint, Saline, and Eureka valleys" have creosote bush, unlike the Deep Springs Valley which includes part of the Great Basin scrub desert.

The study and definition of ecoregions can also indicate the boundaries of the Great Basin Desert. In 1987 J.M. Omernik defined a desert ecoregion between the Sierra Nevada and Wasatch Range, naming it the "Northern Basin and Range" ecoregion. In 1999, the U.S. EPA renamed the "Northern Basin and Range" the "Central Basin and Range" and the "(Snake River) High Desert" the "Northern Basin and Range". (Note: The map on this website illustrates the boundaries of the "(Snake River) High Desert", which had been split off earlier from Ormernik's "Snake River Basin/High Desert".) The World Wildlife Fund adopted the Basin and Range ecoregions from Omernik, but excised a small region of high-altitude areas which contain Holocene refugia, from the former "Northern Basin and Range" ecoregion and renamed it the "Great Basin Shrub Steppe". Although the EPA had refined the boundaries of the Central Basin and Range ecoregion by 2003, (Note: The Northern Basin and Range ecoregion was extended further east, contracting the eastern portion of the Central Basin and Range to the south, separating it from the Snake River Plain ecoregion.) when USGS geographer Christopher Soulard wrote his reports on the region, his maps used the 1999 boundary for the "Central Basin and Range", which is essentially the same as the "Great Basin Shrub Steppe". (Note: Both areas correspond to Omernik's Northern Basin and Range ecoregion.) He states that the Great Basin Desert is "encompassed within" that area.

This article describes the general ecology of the region, including the high-elevation areas, and does not rely on minor differences in the definitions of the ecoregion or desert. See Great Basin montane forests for more specific details on the high-elevation ecoregion.

== Climate ==
The climate of the Great Basin desert is characterized by extremes: hot, dry summers and cold, snowy winters; frigid alpine ridges and warm, windy valleys; days over 90 °F (32 °C) followed by nights near 40 °F (4 °C). This is the climate of the high desert.

The Great Basin desert climate begins with the Sierra Nevada in eastern California. Rising 14,000 feet (4,300 m) above sea level, this mountain range casts a large rain shadow over the desert. Weather coming in from the Pacific Ocean quickly loses its moisture as rain and snow as it is forced up and over the steep mountains. By the time it reaches the east side of the mountains, little moisture is left to bring to the desert. The rain shadow effect is more pronounced closer to the Sierra Nevada, with yearly precipitation in the Great Basin desert averaging 9 inches (230 mm) in the west and 12 inches (300 mm) inches in the east. Moisture that manages to reach the ecoregion tends to precipitate as rain and snow in higher elevations, primarily over the region's long, parallel mountains. Ultimately, any precipitation that falls within the desert fails to drain either to the Atlantic Ocean or to the Pacific Ocean (thus the term "basin"). Instead, precipitation drains to ephemeral or saline lakes via streams, or disappears via evaporation or absorption into the soil. The desert is the coldest of the deserts in North America.

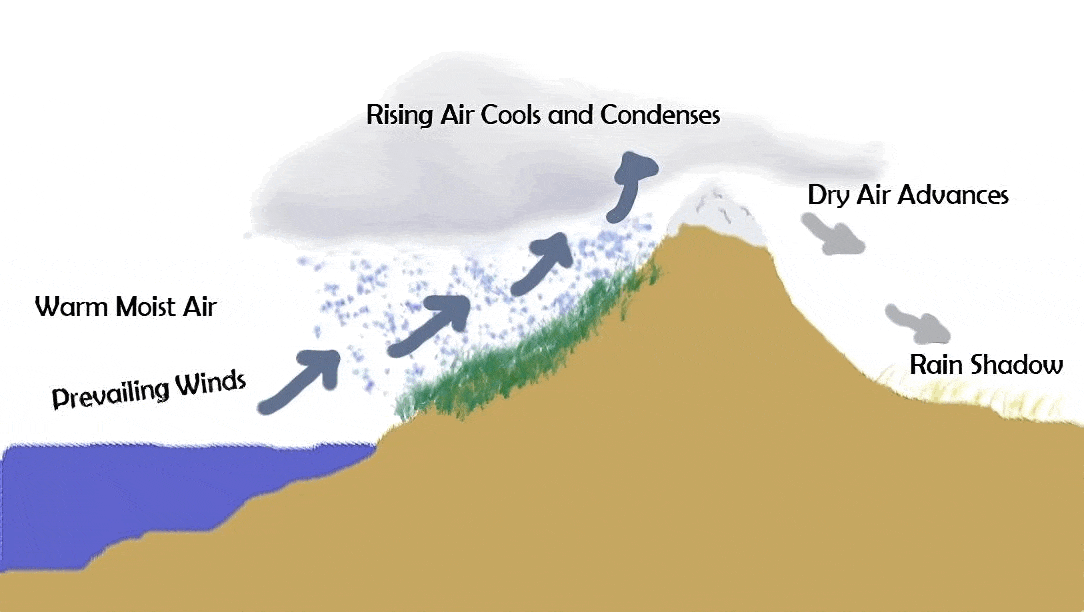
Orographic uplift resulting in a rain shadow as air descends and compresses, resulting in arid warming on the leeward side of a mountain

On any given day, the weather across the Great Basin desert is variable. The region is extremely mountainous, and the temperatures vary depending on the elevation. In general, temperature decreases 3.6 degrees F for every 1000 feet gained in elevation. This translates to as much as a 30 °F (17 °C) difference between mountaintops and valley floors on the same day at the same time. In the heat of summer this difference can be even more pronounced. With some exceptions wind generally increases with elevation or altitude and thus strong winds are often encountered on mountain tops and ridges.

This dry climate and rugged topography proves too harsh for many plant and animal species; however, genetic adaptations to these conditions have led to reasonably high species richness within the ecoregion.

The Great Basin National Park, located in a central part of the Great Basin desert, provides perhaps the best example of a typical climate for the region.

Climate data for Great Basin National Park - Lehman Caves Visitor Center (elevation 6,840 feet (2,080 m))
Month	Jan	Feb	Mar	Apr	May	Jun	Jul	Aug	Sep	Oct	Nov	Dec	Year
Record high °F (°C)	67 (19)	66 (19)	74 (23)	81 (27)	91 (33)	97 (36)	100 (38)	96 (36)	93 (34)	83 (28)	77 (25)	67 (19)	100 (38)
Mean daily maximum °F (°C)	40.5 (4.7)	42.8 (6.0)	48.7 (9.3)	56.7 (13.7)	66.5 (19.2)	77.4 (25.2)	85.7 (29.8)	83.3 (28.5)	74.5 (23.6)	61.7 (16.5)	48.4 (9.1)	41.1 (5.1)	60.6 (15.9)
Mean daily minimum °F (°C)	18.9 (−7.3)	21.2 (−6.0)	25.5 (−3.6)	31.5 (−0.3)	40.0 (4.4)	49.0 (9.4)	57.4 (14.1)	55.8 (13.2)	47.0 (8.3)	37.1 (2.8)	25.9 (−3.4)	19.6 (−6.9)	35.7 (2.1)
Record low °F (°C)	−20 (−29)	−15 (−26)	−2 (−19)	0 (−18)	6 (−14)	14 (−10)	32 (0)	32 (0)	10 (−12)	6 (−14)	−12 (−24)	−19 (−28)	−20 (−29)
Average precipitation inches (mm)	1.05 (27)	1.18 (30)	1.37 (35)	1.21 (31)	1.24 (31)	0.87 (22)	0.97 (25)	1.18 (30)	1.08 (27)	1.24 (31)	0.97 (25)	0.96 (24)	13.33 (339)
Average snowfall inches (cm)	12.8 (33)	13.8 (35)	13.2 (34)	7.1 (18)	2.1 (5.3)	0.2 (0.51)	0 (0)	0 (0)	0.2 (0.51)	3.7 (9.4)	8.7 (22)	10.7 (27)	72.6 (184)

Fallon's climate is typical of lower elevations in the western part of the Great Basin desert. Located in the Forty Mile Desert, precipitation is rare, and summers are hot, though temperatures are more moderate than those in deserts like the Mojave and Sonoran, due to the region's higher elevation and latitude. Winters in this section of the basin are still cold, however.

Climate data for Fallon, Nevada. (Elevation 3,960 feet (1,210 m))
Month	Jan	Feb	Mar	Apr	May	Jun	Jul	Aug	Sep	Oct	Nov	Dec	Year
Record high °F (°C)	71 (22)	78 (26)	84 (29)	90 (32)	102 (39)	106 (41)	108 (42)	105 (41)	100 (38)	92 (33)	81 (27)	72 (22)	108 (42)
Mean daily maximum °F (°C)	44.3 (6.8)	51.3 (10.7)	58.9 (14.9)	65.9 (18.8)	73.9 (23.3)	83.1 (28.4)	92.2 (33.4)	90.1 (32.3)	81.1 (27.3)	69.2 (20.7)	55.4 (13.0)	45.4 (7.4)	67.6 (19.8)
Mean daily minimum °F (°C)	18.1 (−7.7)	23.2 (−4.9)	27.8 (−2.3)	33.9 (1.1)	41.4 (5.2)	47.9 (8.8)	54.0 (12.2)	51.4 (10.8)	43.2 (6.2)	33.8 (1.0)	24.8 (−4.0)	18.9 (−7.3)	34.9 (1.6)
Record low °F (°C)	−25 (−32)	−27 (−33)	1 (−17)	13 (−11)	20 (−7)	27 (−3)	35 (2)	33 (1)	21 (−6)	12 (−11)	0 (−18)	−21 (−29)	−27 (−33)
Average precipitation inches (mm)	0.54 (14)	0.54 (14)	0.46 (12)	0.51 (13)	0.60 (15)	0.43 (11)	0.16 (4.1)	0.22 (5.6)	0.28 (7.1)	0.41 (10)	0.38 (9.7)	0.48 (12)	4.98 (126)
Average snowfall inches (cm)	1.8 (4.6)	0.9 (2.3)	0.8 (2.0)	0.2 (0.51)	0.1 (0.25)	0 (0)	0 (0)	0 (0)	0 (0)	0.1 (0.25)	0.5 (1.3)	1.3 (3.3)	5.7 (14)
Source: The Western Regional Climate Center

The Great Salt Lake Desert, located near the northeast corner of the Great Basin desert, is an excellent example of a cold desert climate. Although still arid, it is worthy to note that this portion of the desert receives more precipitation than the similar playas and salt pans on the western edge of the Great Basin desert.

Climate data for Knolls, Great Salt Lake Desert, Utah. (Elevation 4,250 feet (1,300 m))
Month	Jan	Feb	Mar	Apr	May	Jun	Jul	Aug	Sep	Oct	Nov	Dec	Year
Record high °F (°C)	63 (17)	63 (17)	79 (26)	87 (31)	98 (37)	104 (40)	106 (41)	103 (39)	99 (37)	89 (32)	71 (22)	66 (19)	106 (41)
Mean daily maximum °F (°C)	36.5 (2.5)	41.4 (5.2)	54.4 (12.4)	62.3 (16.8)	72.3 (22.4)	83.5 (28.6)	92.8 (33.8)	90.9 (32.7)	80.0 (26.7)	64.3 (17.9)	46.5 (8.1)	36.5 (2.5)	63.4 (17.4)
Mean daily minimum °F (°C)	16.9 (−8.4)	19.3 (−7.1)	29.1 (−1.6)	36.6 (2.6)	44.9 (7.2)	54.7 (12.6)	62.1 (16.7)	59.5 (15.3)	48.0 (8.9)	34.4 (1.3)	23.3 (−4.8)	14.5 (−9.7)	37.0 (2.8)
Record low °F (°C)	−16 (−27)	−17 (−27)	−1 (−18)	14 (−10)	24 (−4)	35 (2)	43 (6)	39 (4)	25 (−4)	8 (−13)	−3 (−19)	−25 (−32)	−25 (−32)
Average precipitation inches (mm)	0.61 (15)	0.46 (12)	0.91 (23)	1.01 (26)	1.23 (31)	0.68 (17)	0.36 (9.1)	0.31 (7.9)	0.56 (14)	0.77 (20)	0.61 (15)	0.38 (9.7)	7.88 (200)
Average snowfall inches (cm)	0.3 (0.76)	0.1 (0.25)	0 (0)	0 (0)	0 (0)	0 (0)	0 (0)	0 (0)	0 (0)	0 (0)	0 (0)	0.1 (0.25)	0.5 (1.3)
Source: The Western Regional Climate Center

== Biological communities ==
The pattern of 'basin and range' with adjacent basins and ranges in this region results in incredible biological diversity. Climate, elevation, soil type, and many anthropogenic variables greatly influence the diversity and distribution of shrubland, grassland, and woodland communities in the desert. Across the high desert there are numerous sub-climates correlating to the varied elevations. Heading from the valley bottoms to the mountain peaks one will encounter constantly changing combinations of plant and animal species making up some 200 distinct biological communities. These communities can be generally grouped into six general communities or "life zones".

=== Shadscale zone ===
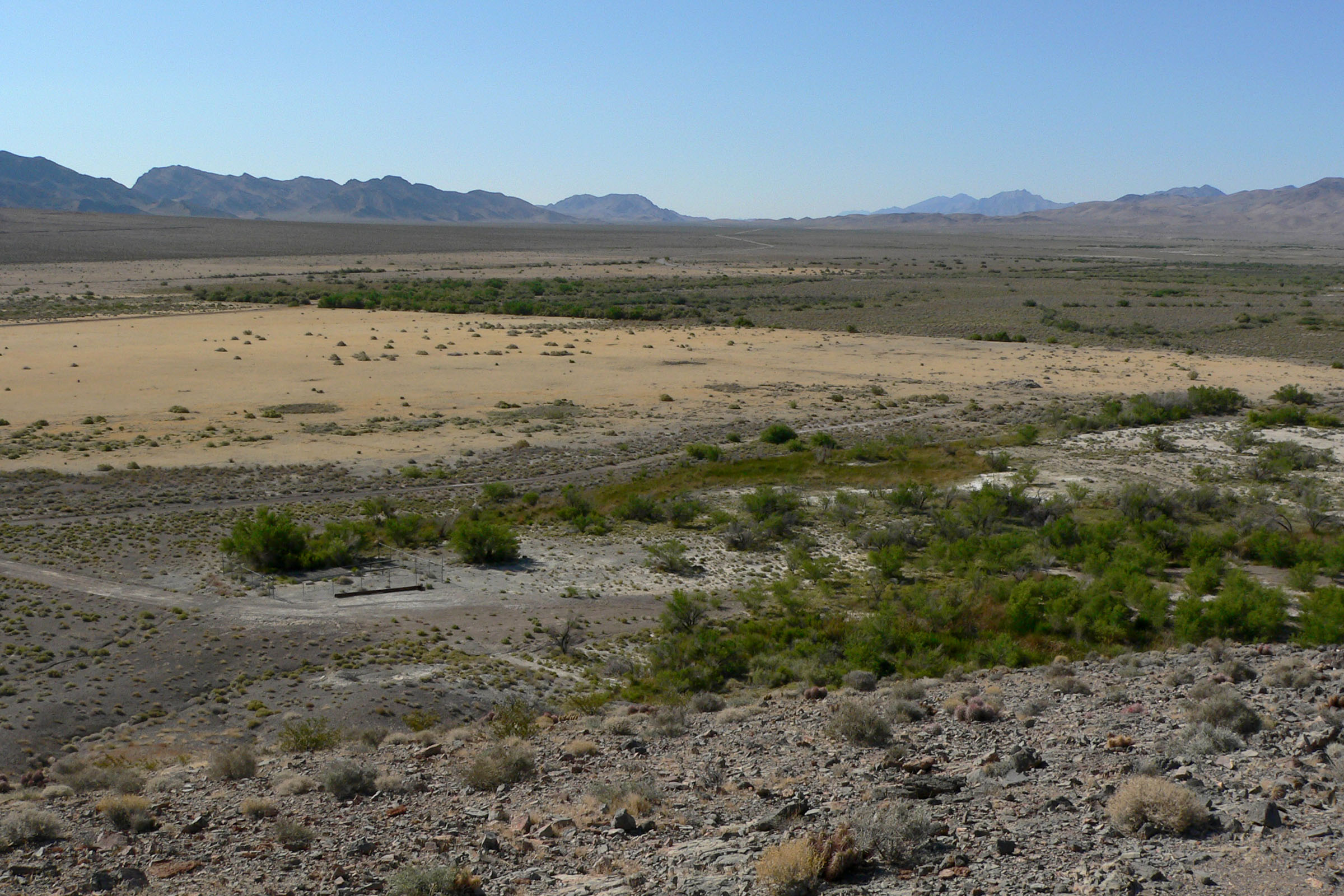
Valley bottom at Ash Meadows National Wildlife Refuge

In the lower valley bottoms where mountain run off evaporates to create saline soils is the shadscale zone. Plants in this community are adapted to living with very little precipitation, high heat, and saline conditions. The amount of water and the soil type in any one area will determine exactly which plants will live there. Certain areas of the valley floors may harbor no life. These parched areas that flood periodically are called playas. On the shores of the playas, shadscale is the dominant plant, but is kept company by iodine bush, saltgrass, spiny hopsage, winterfat, four-winged saltbrush, and green rabbitbrush. Trees are not found in this community. Big greasewood is the dominant shrub in more saline areas or where the water table is high. These shrubs and associated grasses typically produce abundant small seeds that are harvested by rodents and insects. The soil salinity and lack of moisture in this zone is not very conducive to most agriculture; however, livestock grazing and grain farming have historically contributed to a decline in the already scattered vegetation.

=== Sagebrush zone ===
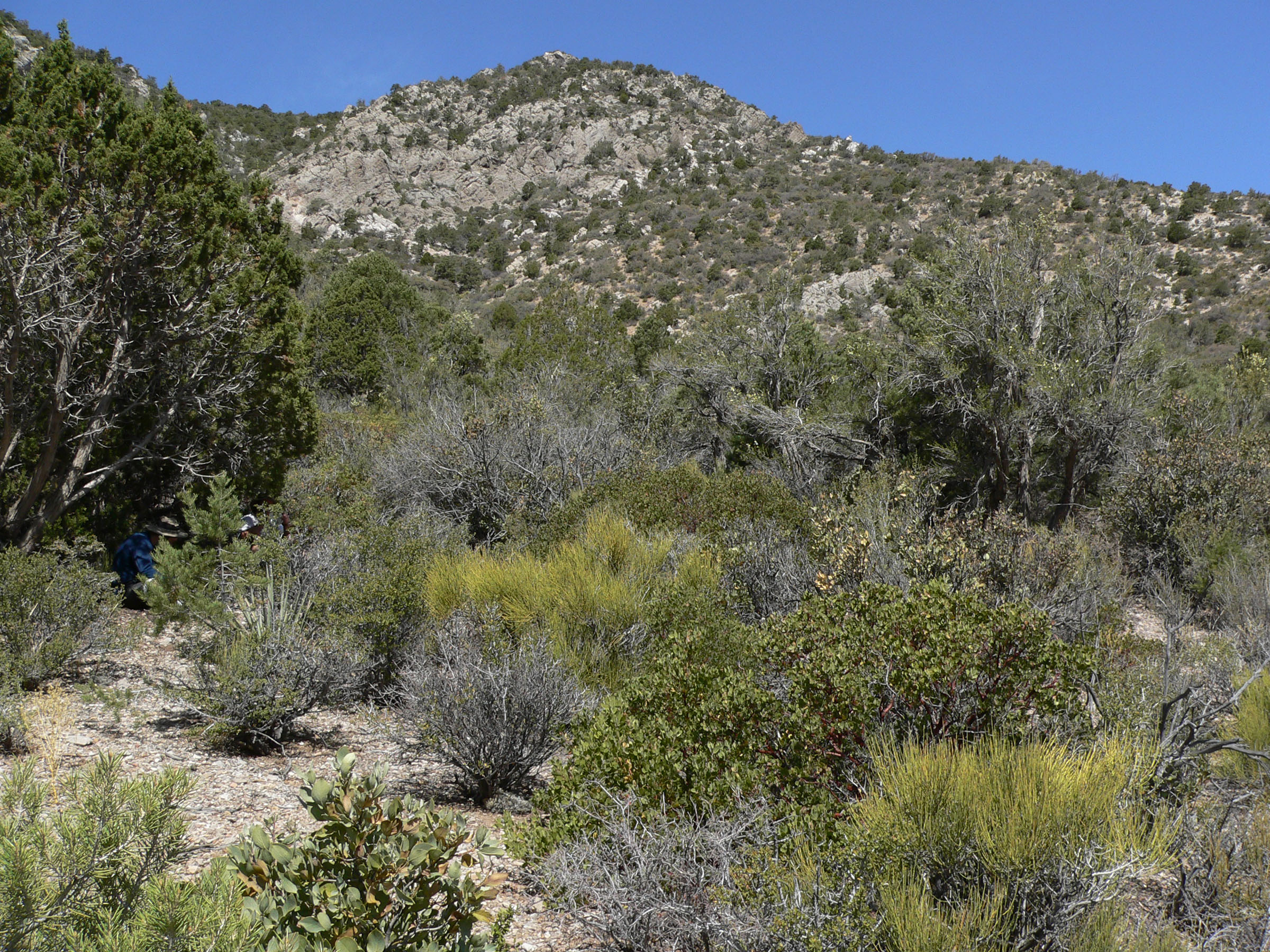
Sagebrush in the Virgin Mountains, Nevada

The drop in soil salinity and increase in moisture as elevation increases leads to a transition to sagebrush (Artemisia) and grasses just above the shadscale zone. This expanse, called the sagebrush zone, constitutes the largest amount of land in the desert (38.7 percent) and is dominated by big sagebrush (Artemisia tridentata) shrubland. The sagebrush zone occurs on the lower mountain slopes, alluvial fans, and bajadas. Areas in this zone that have wetter and less saline soils are dominated by big sagebrush. Low sagebrush or black sagebrush dominate areas with steep rocky slopes and shallow soils. Introduced annual grasses such as cheatgrass (Bromus tectorum) and halogeton (Halogeton glomeratus) also characterize this zone, although native bunchgrasses once thrived amongst sagebrush. Historical fire suppression, adjusted fire frequency following the introduction of annual grasses and widespread livestock grazing have contributed to contraction of the sagebrush zone. According to Noss, 99 percent of the sagebrush-grass zone has been damaged by livestock, with major damage in 30 percent of the zone. Other shrubs commonly found in the sagebrush zone are rabbitbrush, bitterbrush, snowberry, and Mormon tea (ephedra).

=== Pinyon-Juniper community ===
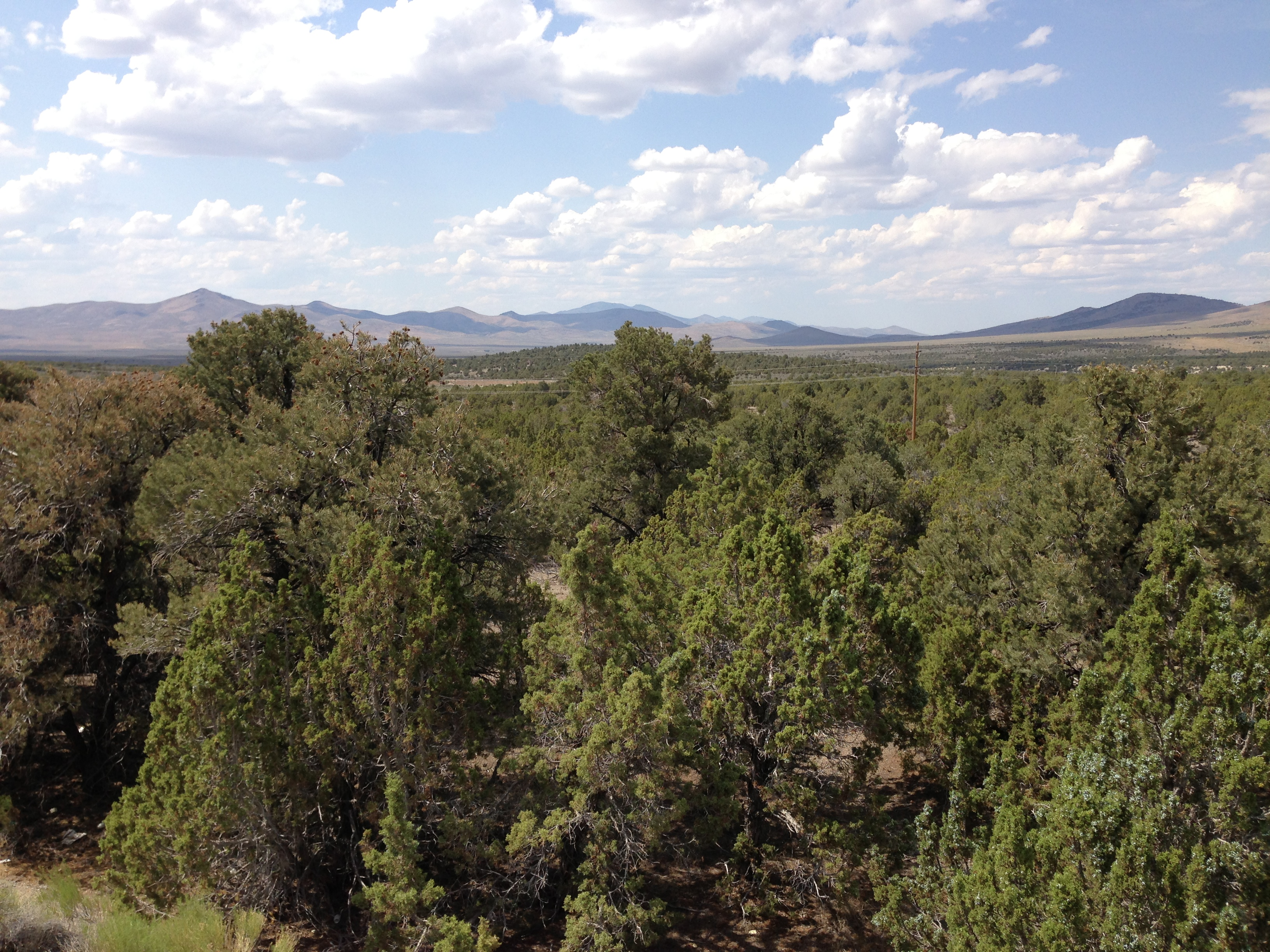
Pinyon-Juniper woodland in Elko County, Nevada

The pinyon–juniper community is adjacent and above the sagebrush zone. The main plants in this community are singleleaf pinyon pine and Utah juniper, often with a sagebrush and bitterbrush understory. Other species of junipers also occur in this zone, including Juniperus communis and Juniperus occidentalis.

The elevational range of this zone varies, but it is usually found between 6,000 and 8,000 feet (1,800 and 2,400 m), with lower limits determined by lack of moisture and the upper limits determined by temperature. The pinyon-juniper community consists of short evergreen trees that rarely grow over 20 feet in height. This zone of dense vegetation, made possible by thermal inversions and increased precipitation, is important to a wide variety of isolated animals that rely on this vegetation interface for survival (for example, Eutamias palmeri).

The trees are widely spaced and have an understory of a mixture of shrubs and herbaceous plants, often with nearly bare ground. These characteristics have led this zone to be named the "pygmy forest" by many scientists. The lower end of this zone is dominated by juniper; the middle is a combination of both species, and the upper end is dominated by pinyon.

=== Montane community ===
The taller ranges of the Great Basin desert have a montane community. Due to the great distances created by basins between these small forest habitats, various rock substrates, and local climates, montane forests are tremendously varied across the desert.

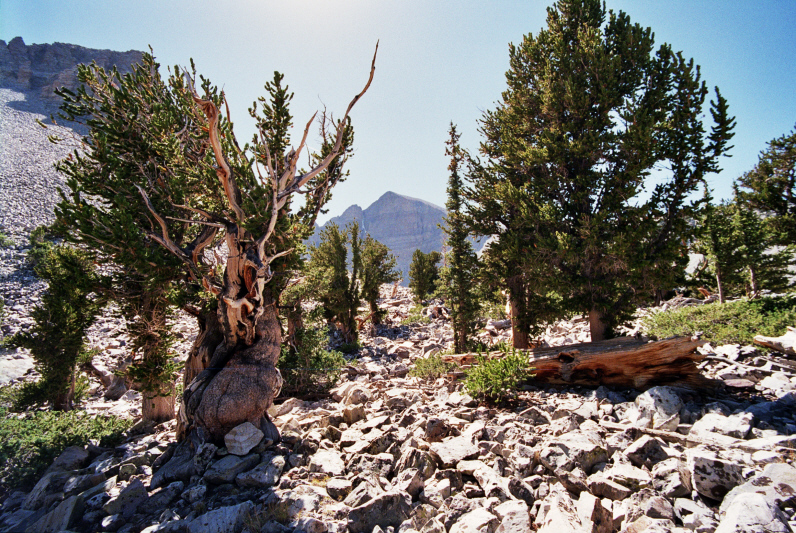
A grove of Great Basin bristlecone pines

Isolated from one mountain range to the next, montane communities in the region have long individual histories, each one affected differently by chance factors of migration over vast expanses of desert. Smaller communities are also vulnerable to adverse effects of climate change and to genetic drift.

White fir, Douglas fir, and ponderosa pines are found in the middle elevations of some mountain ranges, while limber pine, subalpine fir, Engelmann spruce, and bristlecone pines occupy the higher elevations, continuing to the upper tree line. Mountain mahogany often dominates drier, warmer south-facing slopes. Pure stands of aspen are also common in this community.

The bristlecone pine is an important species that is indicative of the Great Basin desert. Bristlecones live a long time, some for thousands of years. The harsh areas they occupy are often devoid of other plant life, so there is little competition and reduced risk of fire. The trees grow very slowly, producing very dense, disease-resistant wood. These factors contribute to the bristlecone's long life.

=== Alpine community ===
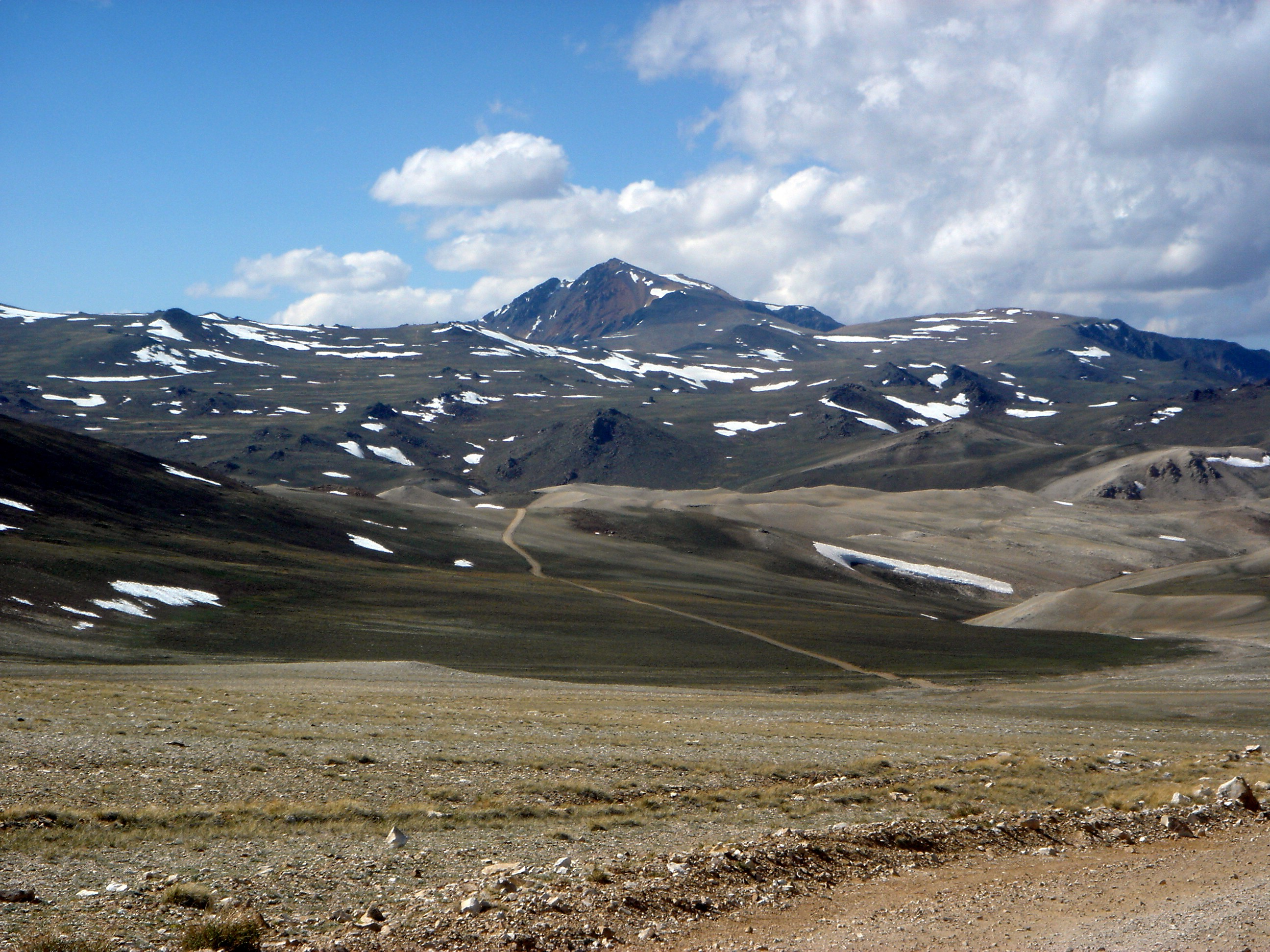
Alpine tundra at White Mountain in California

Some mountain ranges in the Great Basin desert are high enough to have an alpine community; a community of low growing plants above the treeline. Treeline is generally found above 10,000 feet (3,000 m) in the Great Basin desert, moving downslope with higher latitudes. The plants that grow above treeline are separated from other such areas by miles of foothills and valleys. This "island" phenomenon produces many endemic species - species that have evolved while isolated on a particular mountain peak or range and are found only in that one place. Grasses, sedges, low perennial herbs, and wildflowers grow above treeline.

=== Riparian community ===
The riparian communities of the Great Basin desert cut across all elevations and life zones. In the Great Basin desert surface water is rapidly lost by evaporation or infiltration. However, areas around streams where plant life is abundant constitute a riparian area. Water-loving plants like willow, narrowleaf cottonwood, choke cherry, wild rose, and aspen are found along these wet areas. The willow has a spreading root network that allows it to reach all around for water and it also helps streams by slowing erosion. These plants provide wood for beavers. In this community, silver buffaloberry often provides shelter for North American porcupines.

== Subregions ==
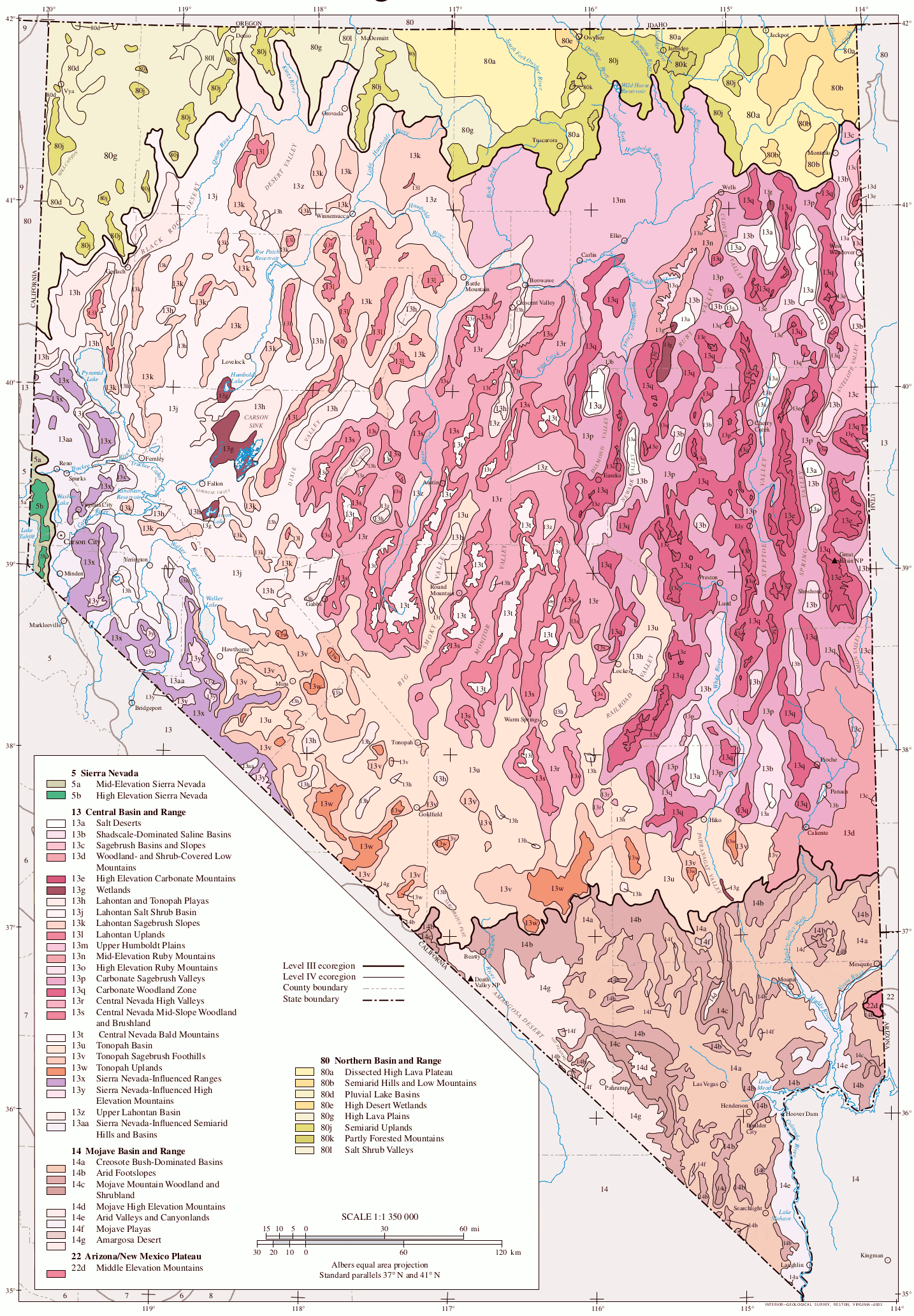
Map of ecoregions in Nevada. Some of the Level IV ecoregions are described in this article.

The U.S. Environmental Protection Agency defines its Central Basin and Range ecoregion as Level III: it is at the third level of a tree of ecoregions that cover North America. It further defines sub-ecoregions at Level IV, which describe differences in the ecoregion at different locations. The map shows the Level IV EPA ecoregions in Nevada. The low-elevation ecoregions lie in the Great Basin shrub steppe, while the high-elevation ones lie in the Great Basin montane forests (as defined by the WWF).

=== Salt deserts ===
The Salt desert ecoregion is composed of nearly level playas, salt flats, mud flats, and saline lakes. These features are characteristic of the Bonneville Basin: they have a higher salt content than those of the Lahontan and Tonopah playas ecoregion, below. Water levels and salinity varies from year to year. During dry periods salt encrustation and wind erosion occur. Vegetation is mostly absent, although scattered salt-tolerant plants, such as pickleweed, iodinebush, black greasewood, and inland saltgrass occur. Soils are not arable and there is very limited grazing potential. The salt deserts provide wildlife habitat and serve some recreational, military, and industrial uses. A prime example of this ecoregion is the Bonneville Salt Flats.

=== Shadscale-dominated saline basins ===
The Shadscale-dominated saline basins ecoregion is arid, internally drained and gently sloping to nearly flat. These basins are in, or are characteristic of, the Bonneville Basin: they are higher in elevation and colder in winter than the Lahontan salt shrub basin ecoregion to the west. Light-colored soils with high salt and alkali content occur and are dry for extended periods. The saltbush vegetation common to this ecoregion has a higher tolerance for extremes in temperature, aridity, and salinity than big sagebrush, which dominates ecoregion 13c at somewhat higher elevation. The basins in Nevada, in contrast to those in Utah, are more constricted in area and are more influenced by nearby mountain ranges with extensive carbonate rock exposures, which provide water by percolation through the limestone substrate to surface as valley springs. Isolated valley drainages support endemic fish, such as the Newark Valley tui chub.

=== Lahontan and Tonopah playas ===
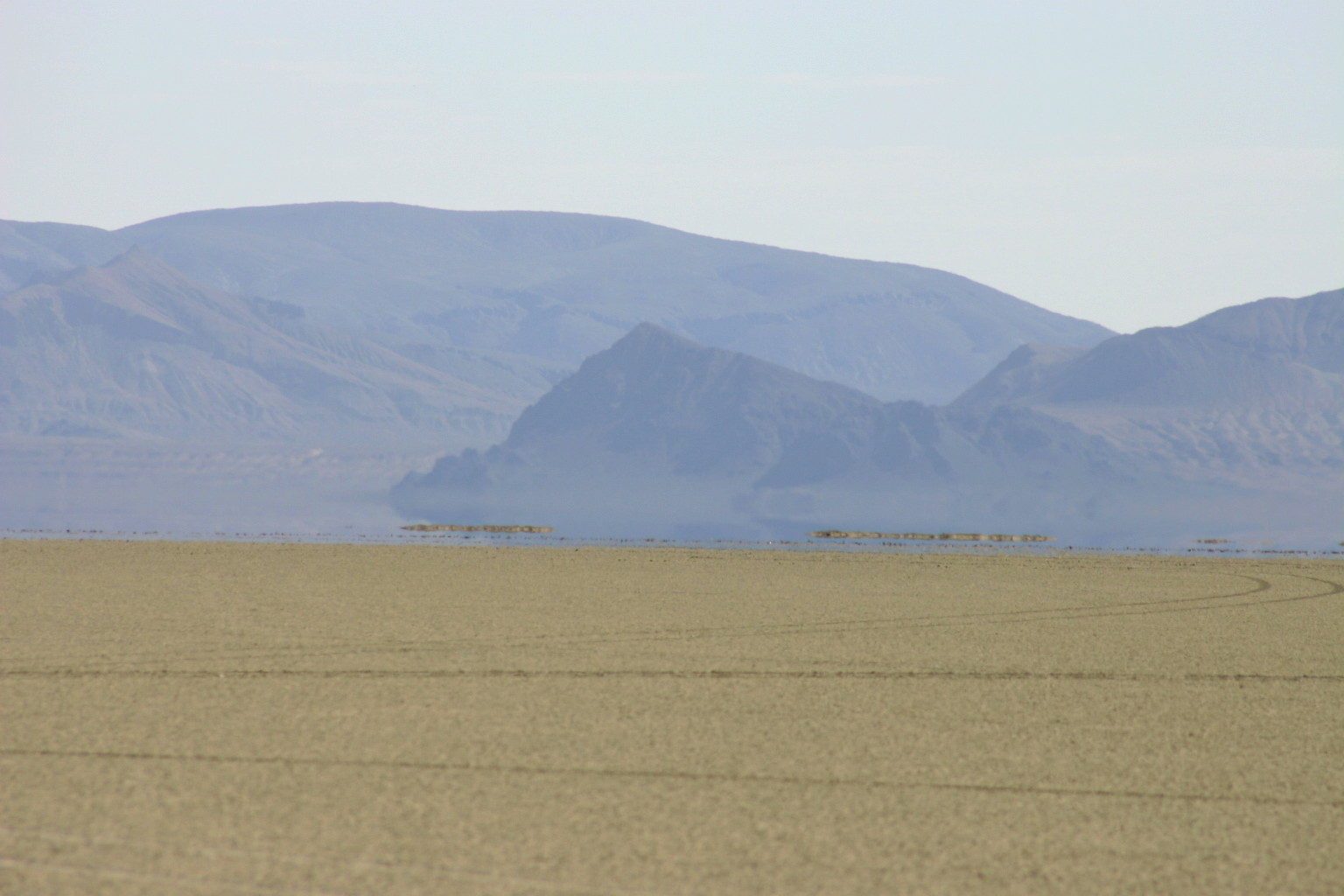
A playa in the Black Rock Desert

The nearly level and often barren Lahontan and Tonopah playas contain mudflats, alkali flats, and intermittent saline lakes, such as the Black Rock Desert, Carson Sink, and Sarcobatus Flat. Marshes, remnant lakes and playas are all that remain of Pleistocene Lake Lahontan, which was once the size of Lake Erie. Playas occur in the lowest elevation of the Lahontan Basin, and represent the terminus or sink of rivers running east of the Sierra Nevada. The playas fill with seasonal runoff from the surrounding mountains, providing habitat for migratory birds. Black greasewood or four-winged saltbush may grow around the perimeter in the transition to the salt shrub community, where they often stabilize areas of low sand dunes. This ecoregion has limited grazing potential. Windblown salt dust from exposed playas may affect upland soils and vegetation. The Lahontan and Tonopah playas are important as wildlife habitat, as well as for recreational and military uses.

=== Lahontan salt shrub basin ===
The Lahontan salt shrub basin is an expansive dry plain that was once below Pleistocene Lake Lahontan. The Lahontan Basin, compared to the Bonneville Basin to the east, is lower in elevation and warmer in winter. Although there is a direct connection to the south to the Mojave Desert, winters are cold enough in this ecoregion to discourage the northward dispersal of Mojavean species into the Lahontan Basin. In addition to shadscale, other salt-tolerant shrubs, such as Shockley's desert-thorn and Bailey greasewood, cover the lower basin slopes. These shrubs distinguish the Lahontan salt shrub basin and the Tonopah Basin from other Nevada salt shrub ecoregions. Sand dunes may occur where windblown sand accumulates against a barrier; dune complexes support a specialized plant community and diverse small mammal populations. The Carson and Truckee Rivers, originating in the Sierra Nevada, provide water for irrigated farming. Riparian corridors along these rivers support the only trees found in this ecoregion.

=== Lahontan sagebrush slopes ===
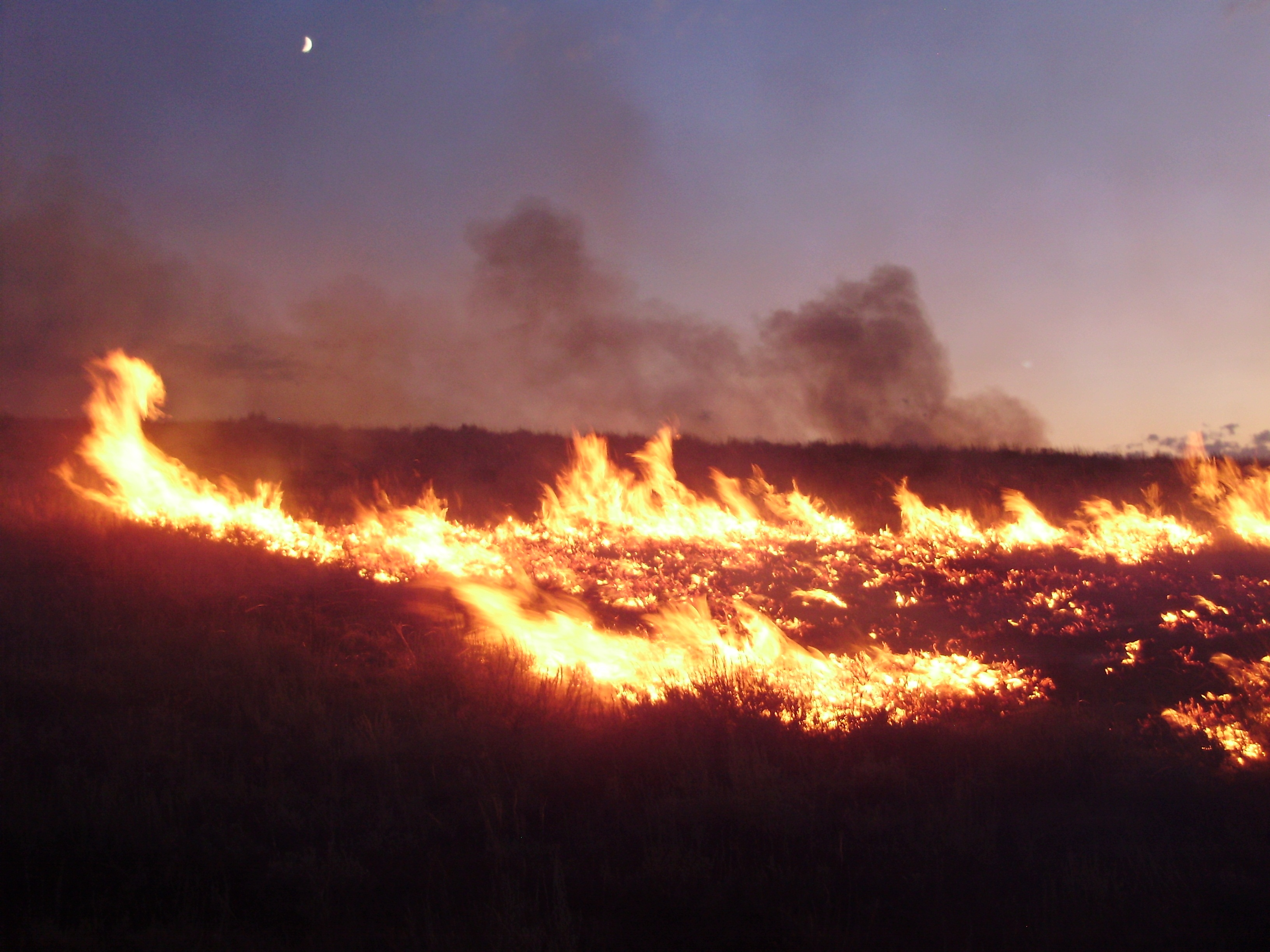
Lightning-sparked wildfires are common occurrences in the Great Basin desert.

Hills, alluvial fans, and low mountains comprise the Lahontan sagebrush slopes ecoregion. These areas are rock controlled and their soils lack the fine lacustrine sediments that are found in lower parts of the Lahontan Basin. Because moisture increases and alkalinity decreases with elevation, the shrub community grades from the greasewood-shadscale community on the basin floor, to a shrub community dominated by Wyoming big sagebrush and the endemic Lahontan sagebrush at higher elevations. Understory grasses increase the productivity towards the northeast, outside the rain shadow influence of the Sierra Nevada. The low hills and mountains of the Lahontan Basin experience frequent summer lightning and fire. The introduced cheatgrass tends to replace the shrub community and provides fuel for recurrent fires.

=== Lahontan uplands ===
The Lahontan uplands are restricted to the highest elevations of the mountains ranges within the Lahontan salt shrub basin. Slopes vary in elevation from 6,400 to 8,800 feet (2,000 to 2,700 m) and are covered in sagebrush, grasses, and scattered Utah juniper. Pinyon grows with juniper on the Stillwater Range and on Fairview Peak in the southeast portion of the Lahontan Basin, but it is otherwise absent from this ecoregion. Low sagebrush and black sagebrush grow to the mountaintops above the woodland zone. Cool-season grasses, including bluebunch wheatgrass, dominate the understory in the north, but are replaced by warm-season grasses, such as Indian ricegrass, in the south.

=== Upper Humboldt Plain ===
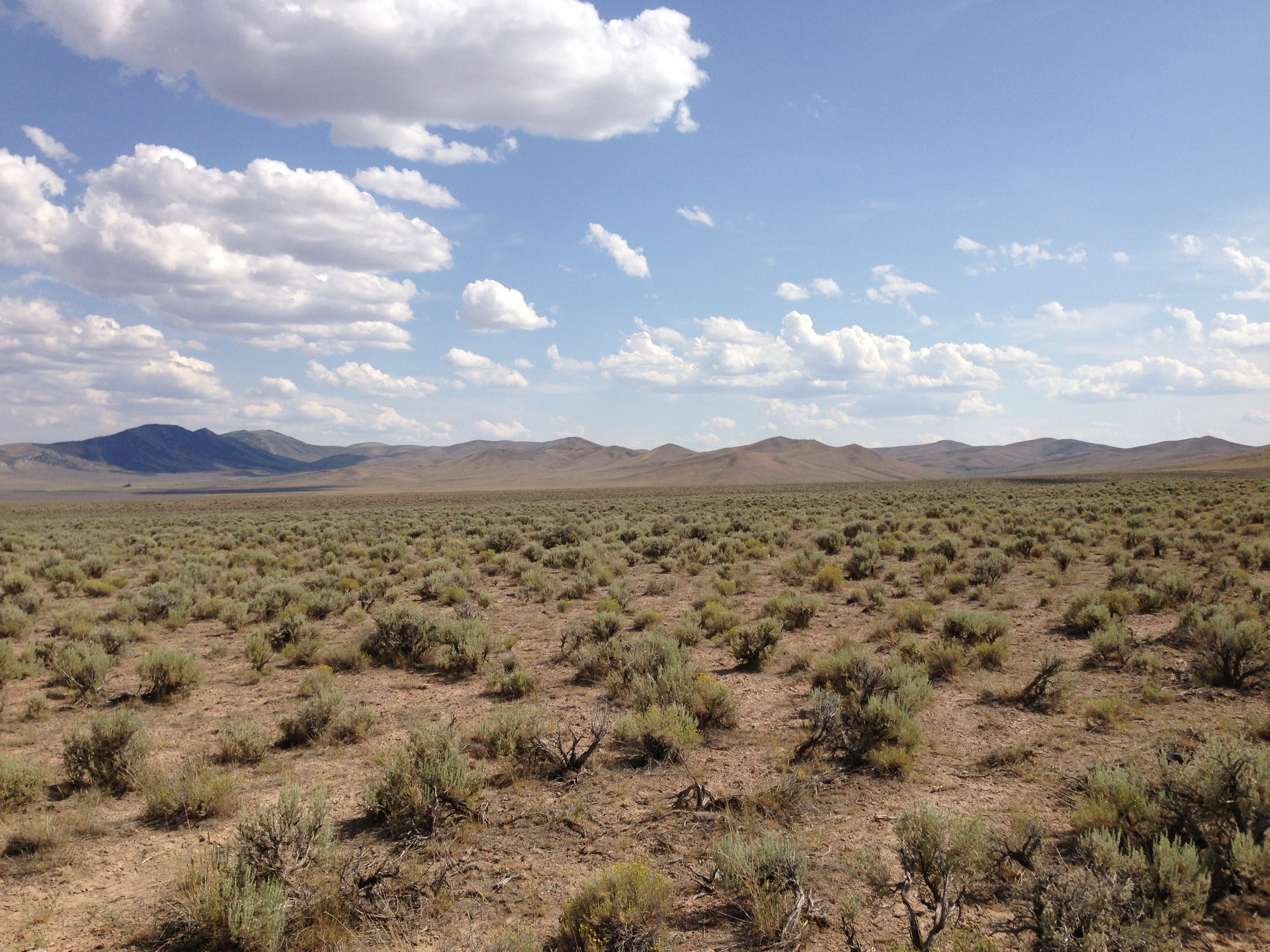
Sagebrush in the Upper Humboldt Plains (13m) ecoregion

The Upper Humboldt Plains ecoregion is an area of rolling plains punctuated by occasional buttes and low mountains. It is mostly underlain by volcanic ash, rhyolite, and tuffaceous rocks. Low sagebrush is common in extensive areas of shallow, stony soil, as are cool season grasses, such as bluebunch wheatgrass, Idaho fescue, and Sandberg bluegrass. The ecoregion is wetter and cooler than other Nevada ecoregions in its elevation range. The ecoregion is transitional to the Northern Basin and Range ecoregion that spans the Nevada-Oregon border. However, as in the warmer Lahontan Basin to the west, lightning fires are common and a post-fire monoculture of cheatgrass tends to replace the native grasses and shrubs. Grazing is the major land use, though there is some agriculture near the Humboldt River.

=== Carbonate Sagebrush Valleys ===
The basins and semi-arid uplands of the Carbonate Sagebrush Valleys surround the carbonate ranges of eastern Nevada. These valleys are underlain by limestone or dolomite. The combination of summer moisture and a limestone or dolomite substrate affects regional vegetation, particularly in terms of species dominance and elevational distribution. The substrate favors shrubs, such as black sagebrush and winterfat, that can tolerate shallow soil. Even in alluvial soils, root growth may be limited by a hardpan or caliche layer formed by carbonates leaching through the soil and accumulating. As a result, shrub cover is sparse in contrast to other sagebrush-covered ecoregions in Nevada. The grass understory grades from a dominance of cool season grasses, such as bluebunch wheatgrass, in the north, to warm season grasses, such as blue grama (an indicator of summer rainfall) in the south.

=== Central Nevada high valleys ===
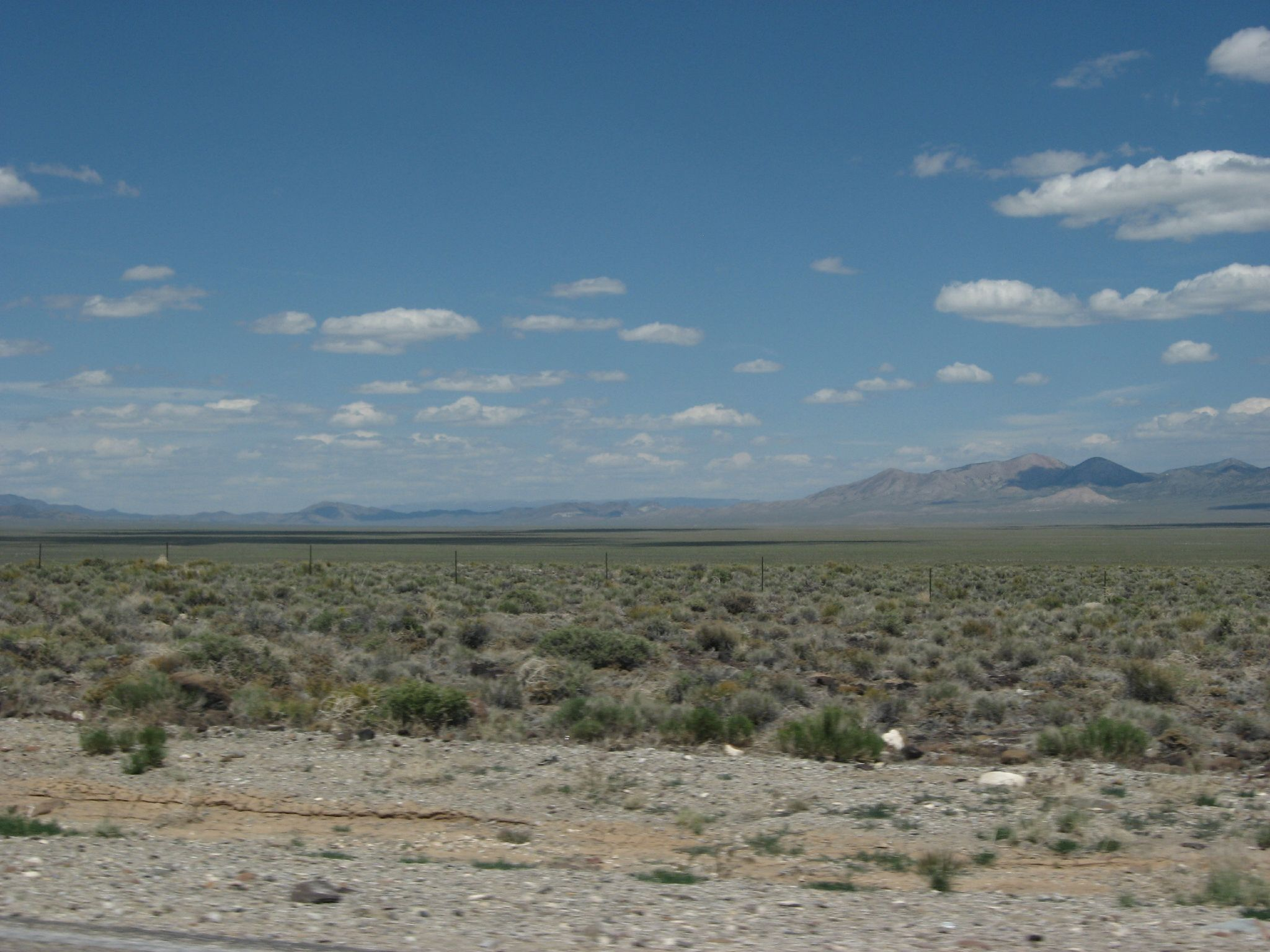
Ralston Valley, Nevada

The Central Nevada high valleys ecoregion contains sagebrush-covered rolling valleys that are generally over 5,000 feet (1,500 m) in elevation. Alluvial fans spilling from the surrounding mountain ranges fill the valleys, often leaving little intervening flat ground. Wyoming big sagebrush and associated grasses are common on the flatter areas, and black sagebrush dominates on the volcanic hills and alluvial fans. This ecoregion tends to have lower species diversity than other sagebrush ecoregions, because of its aridity and isolation from more species-rich areas. Saline playas may occur on available flats. Less shadscale and fewer associated shrubs surround these playas than in other, lower more arid ecoregions in the west, including the Lahontan salt shrub ecoregion and the Tonopah Basin ecoregion. Valleys with permanent water support endemic fish populations, such as the Monitor Valley speckled dace.

=== Central Nevada mid-slope woodland and brushland ===
The Central Nevada mid-slope woodland and brushland ecoregion at 6,500 to 8,000 feet (2,000 to 2,400 m) of elevation is analogous in altitudinal range to other woodland areas in Nevada. However, continuous woodland is not as prevalent on the mountains of central Nevada as in other woodland ecoregions, such as ecoregions 13d and 13q. Pinyon-juniper grows only sparsely through the shrub layer due to combined effects of past fire, logging, and local climate factors, including lack of summer rain and the pattern of winter cold air inversions. Where extensive woodlands do exist, understory diversity tends to be very low, especially in closed canopy areas. Areas of black and Wyoming big sagebrush grade upward into mountain big sagebrush and curlleaf mountain-mahogany, which straddles the transition between this mid-elevation brushland and the mountain brush zone of the higher Central Nevada Bald Mountains.

=== Central Nevada Bald Mountains ===
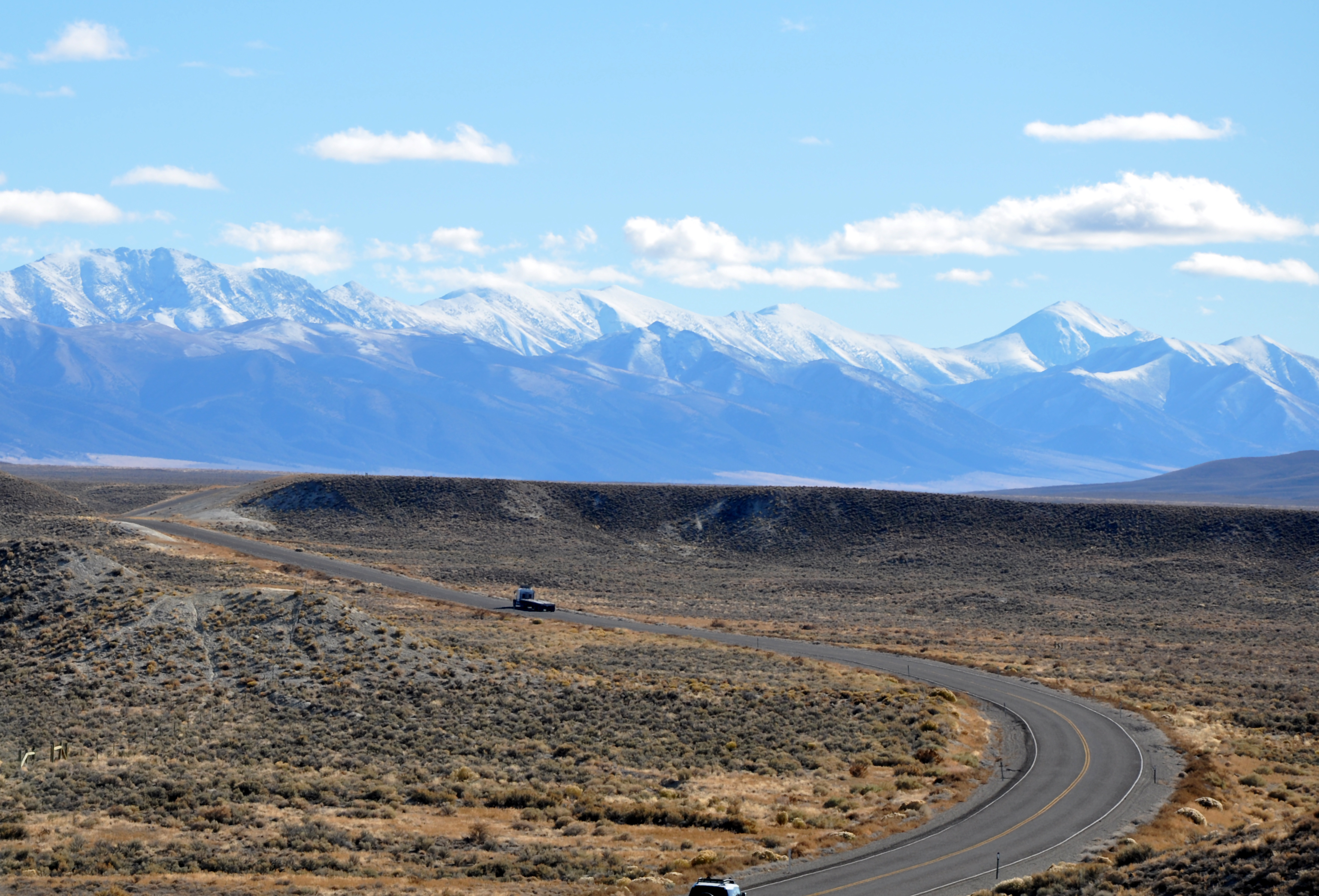
The Toiyabe Range

The Central Nevada Bald Mountains are dry and mostly treeless. Although they rise only 100 miles (160 km) east of the Sierra Nevada, they lack Sierra species due to the dry conditions. These barren-looking mountains are covered instead by dense mountain brush that is dominated by mountain big sagebrush, serviceberry, snowberry, and low sagebrush. They contrast with the High-elevation Carbonate Mountains to the east, where the mountain brush zone is too narrow to be mapped as a separate ecoregion. Scattered groves of curlleaf mountain-mahogany and aspen in moister microsites grow above the shrub layer. A few scattered limber or bristlecone pines grow on ranges that exceed 10,000 feet (3,000 m). The Toiyabe Range (west of Big Smoky Valley) is high enough to have an alpine zone, but lacks a suitable substrate to retain snowmelt moisture. The isolation of these "sky islands" has led to the development of many rare and endemic plant species.

=== Tonopah Basin ===
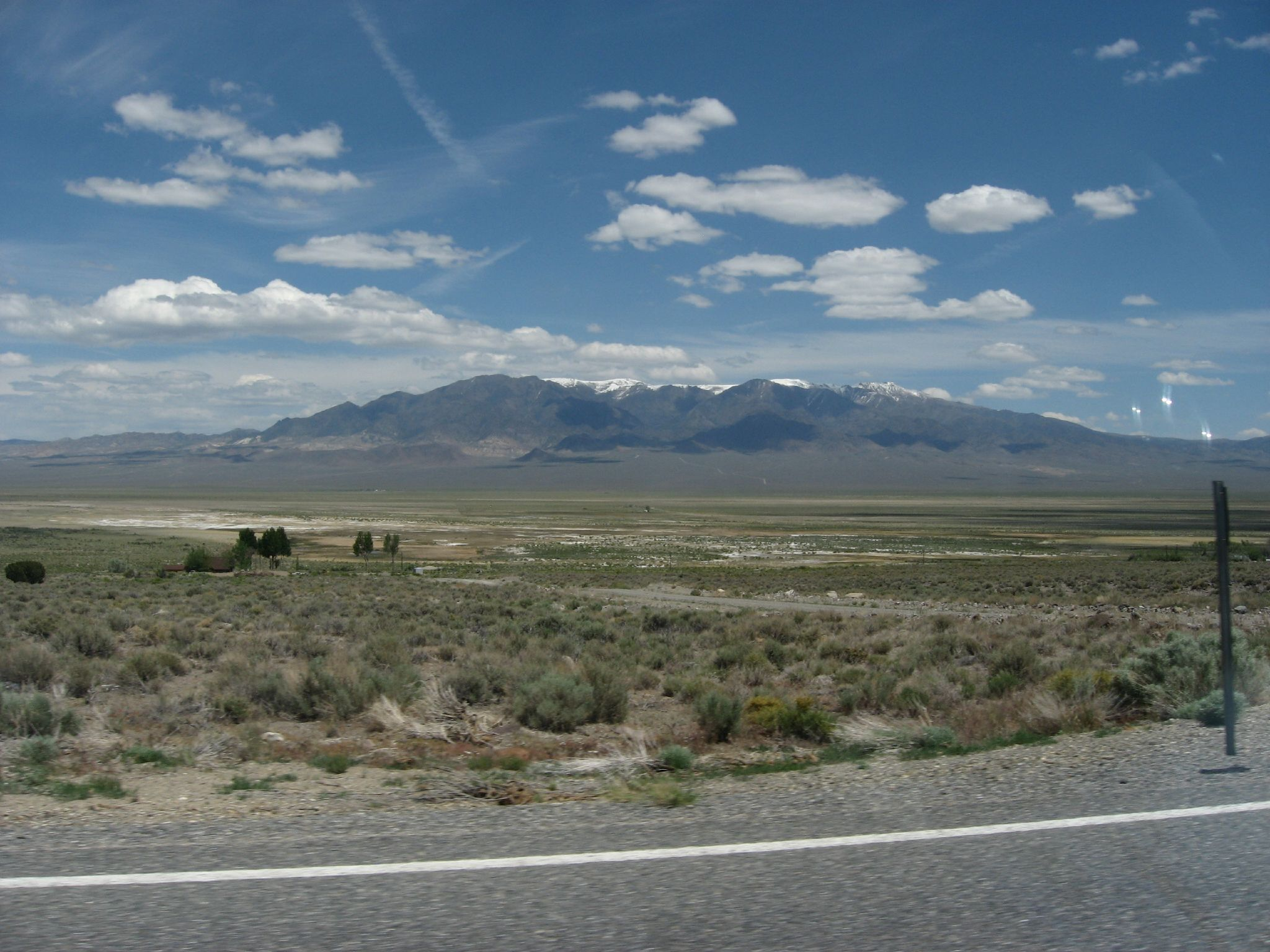
Big Smoky Valley is part of the Tonopah Basin.

The Tonopah Basin lies in the transition between the Great Basin Desert and the more southerly Mojave Desert. The basin shows varying characteristics of both deserts. The west side of the Tonopah Basin is a continuation of the Lahontan Basin, while the lower and hotter Pahranagat Valley on the east side is more like the Mojave Desert. Similar to basins further north, shadscale and associated arid land shrubs cover broad rolling valleys, hills, and alluvial fans. However, unlike the Lahontan salt shrub basin and Upper Lahontan basin, the shrubs often co-dominate in highly diverse mosaics. The shrub understory includes warm-season grasses, such as Indian ricegrass and galleta grass. Endemic fish species, including the Railroad Valley tui chub, Pahranagat roundtail chub, Railroad Valley springfish, and the White River springfish are found in valleys with perennial water.

== Endangered species ==
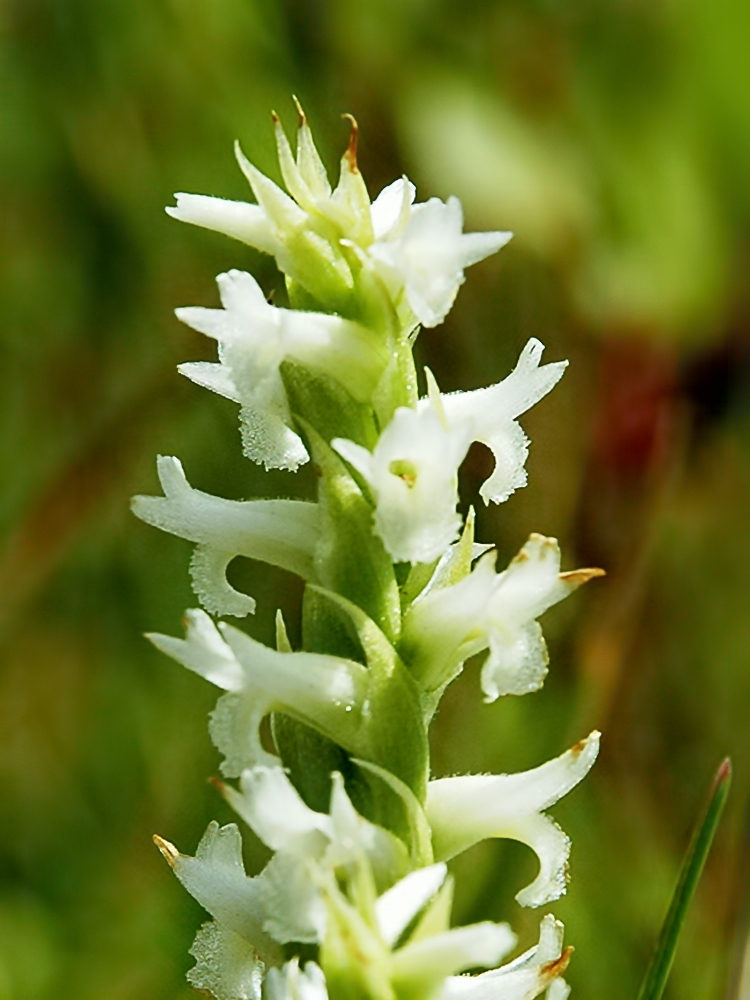
Spiranthes diluvialis

The topography of the Great Basin desert ("island" mountain tops separated from one another by vast expanses of desert valleys) renders it vulnerable to extinctions. Populations that occupy the high peaks are isolated from one another; therefore, they cannot interbreed. Small populations are more vulnerable to the forces of extinction - generally small populations have less genetic diversity and therefore a lesser ability to adapt to changing conditions. Groundwater pumping, road and home construction, grazing, and mining are all activities that alter habitat; as more habitat is affected, the threat of extinction increases. The Great Basin desert is home to many threatened and endangered species:

- Birds
  - Least tern (Sterna antillarum athalassos)
- Plants
  - Sodaville milkvetch (Astragalas lentiginosus var. sesquimetralis)
  - Ute lady's tresses (Spiranthes diluvialis)
- Fish
  - Lahontan cutthroat trout (Oncorhynchus clarki henshawi)
  - Desert dace (Eremichthys acros)
  - White River spinedace (Lepidomeda albivallis)
- Mammals
  - Utah prairie dog (Cynomys parvidens)

== See also ==
- Becky Peak Wilderness (BLM)
- Bristlecone Wilderness (BLM)
- Goshute Canyon Wilderness (BLM)
- Government Peak Wilderness (BLM)
- Great Basin
- Great Basin National Park
- Highland Ridge Wilderness (BLM)
- Humboldt-Toiyabe National Forest
  - Bald Mountain Wilderness (Humboldt NF)
  - Currant Mountain Wilderness (Humboldt NF)
  - East Humboldt Wilderness (Humboldt NF)
  - High Schells Wilderness (Humboldt NF)
  - Jarbidge Wilderness (Humboldt NF)
  - Quinn Canyon Wilderness (Humboldt NF)
  - Red Mountain Wilderness (Humboldt NF)
  - Shellback Wilderness (Humboldt NF)
  - White Pine Range Wilderness (Humboldt NF)
- Mount Grafton Wilderness (BLM)
- Mount Moriah Wilderness (Humboldt NF / BLM)
- South Egan Range Wilderness (BLM)
- Fish Springs National Wildlife Refuge
- Ruby Lake National Wildlife Refuge
- Fallon National Wildlife Refuge
- Stillwater National Wildlife Refuge
