= Great Basin montane forests =

Temperate coniferous forests ecoregion of the United States

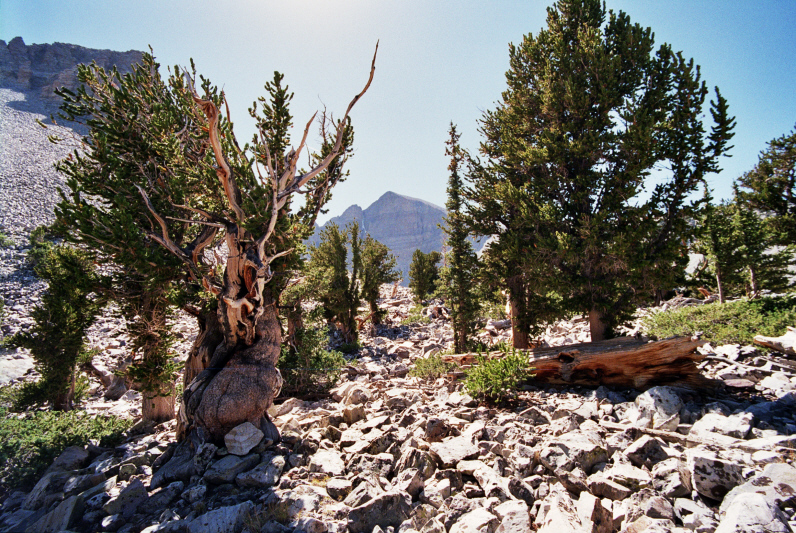
- Great Basin bristlecone pine (Pinus longaeva) trees on Wheeler Peak, Great Basin National Park

- Location in North America

Ecology
- Realm: Nearctic
- Biome: Temperate coniferous forests
- Borders: Great Basin shrub steppe; Mojave Desert
- Bird species: 160
- Mammal species: 91

Geography
- Country: United States
- States: California; Nevada

Conservation
- Habitat loss: 25-50%
- Protected: 97.53%

The Great Basin montane forests is an ecoregion of the Temperate coniferous forests biome, as designated by the World Wildlife Fund (WWF).

== Geography ==
The Great Basin montane forests ecoregion is located in the Great Basin region of Nevada, eastern California, and western Utah, in the Western United States.

The montane forests are often found on sky islands at elevations above the Great Basin Desert or xeric shrublands. The forests are within the Central or Northern Basin and Range ecoregions defined by the U.S. Environmental Protection Agency.

== Species ==
White fir, Douglas fir, and ponderosa pines are found in the middle elevations of some mountain ranges, while limber pine, subalpine fir, Engelmann spruce, and bristlecone pines occupy the higher elevations, continuing to the upper tree line. Mountain mahogany often dominates drier, warmer south-facing slopes. Pure stands of aspen are also common in this community.

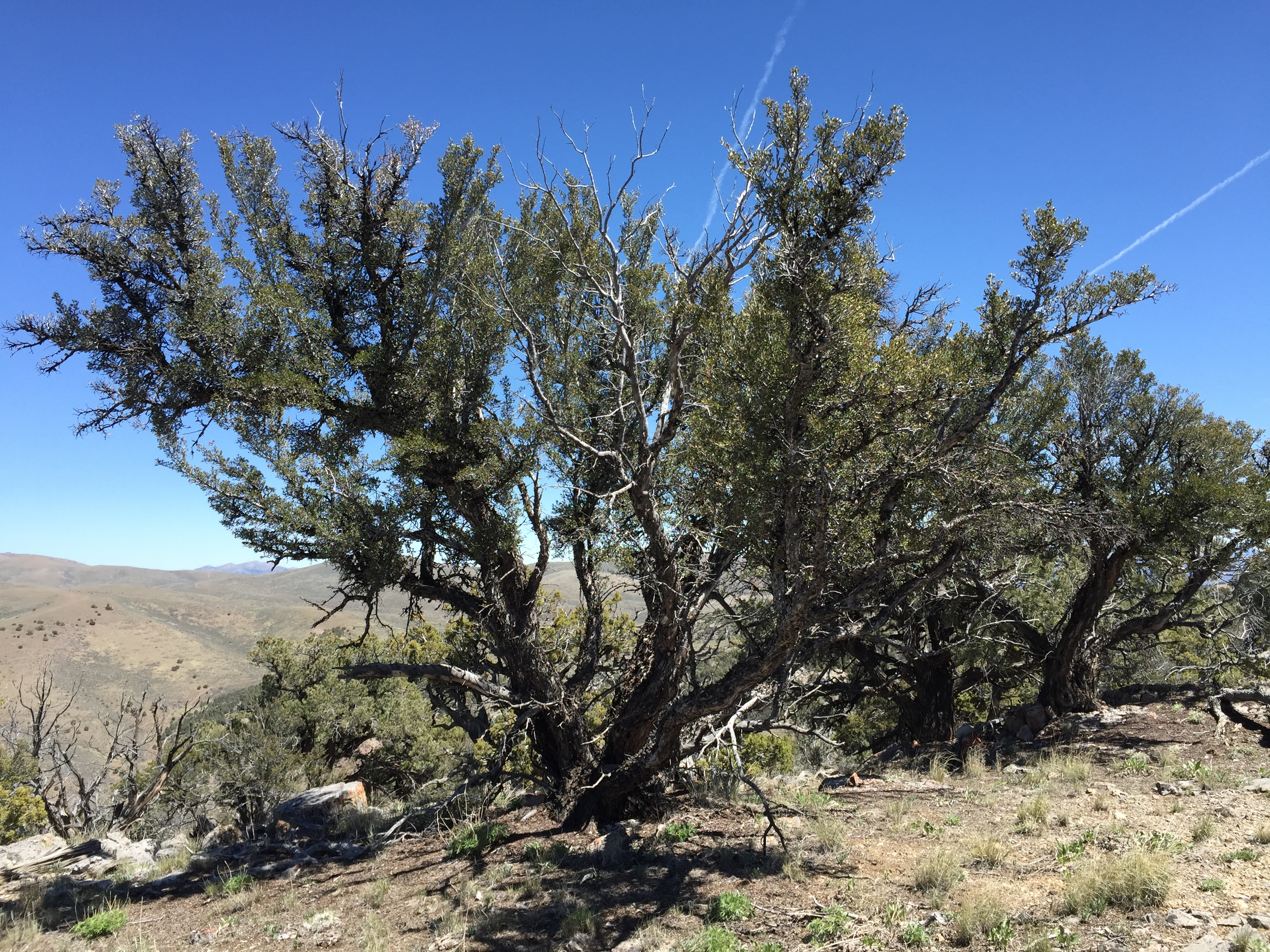
Mountain mahogany, Maverick Canyon

The bristlecone pine is an important species that is indicative of the Great Basin montane forest. Bristlecones live a long time, some for thousands of years. The harsh areas they occupy are often devoid of other plant life, so there is little competition and reduced risk of fire. The trees grow very slowly, producing very dense, disease-resistant wood. These factors contribute to the bristlecone's long life.

Jamesia tetrapetala is an endemic shrub species, native to the Grant, Highland, and Snake ranges of eastern Nevada and the House Range of western Utah, where it grows on limestone cliffs, crevices, and talus slopes from 2000 to 3300 meters elevation.

== Subregions ==
In 1987, Omernik defined the area between the Sierra Nevada and the Wasatch Range as a distinct ecoregion, numbered 13. In 1999, the U.S. Environmental Protection Agency adopted Omernik's ecoregion, labeling it as Level III in its ecoregion hierarchy. Ecoregion 13 was further split into Level IV ecoregions according to elevation and location within Nevada and Utah.

The WWF took ecoregion 13 and split it according to elevation, naming the higher sub-ecoregions the "Great Basin montane forests". Below is a list of higher-level Level IV ecoregions. The high-elevation ecoregions are distributed as sky islands, without contact with each other. In general, the further from the Rocky Mountains, the less species-rich the area.

High-Elevation Central Basin and Range Level IV ecoregions
code	
13d	Woodland and Shrub-Covered Low Mountains
13e	Carbonate High Elevation Mountains
13l	Lahontan Uplands
13o	High Elevation Ruby Mountains
13q	Carbonate Woodland
13w	Tonopah Uplands
13x	Sierra Nevada-Influenced Ranges
13y	Sierra Nevada-Influenced High Elevation Mountains

=== Woodland- and Shrub-Covered Low Mountains ===
The Woodland- and Shrub-Covered Low Mountains ecoregion includes low, rocky mountain ranges, mountain slopes, and foothills with enough available moisture to support open groves of juniper and pinyon pines. The region includes a zone of mountain brush that replaces woodland above the elevational limit of pinyon. In southeastern Nevada, this ecoregion is transitional between the Colorado Plateau, Great Basin Desert, and the Mojave Desert, with some characteristics of each region. Here, Gambel oak, scrub oak, Joshua tree, and blue grama grass may be associated with pinyon–juniper woodland. Summer rainfall is a factor that contributes to woodland diversity and productivity.

=== High-Elevation Carbonate Mountains ===
The High-Elevation Carbonate Mountains ecoregion includes a series of mountain ranges composed of limestone, dolomite, quartzite, and conglomerate in east-central Nevada. These mountains are in the zone of summer rain, although much of the precipitation percolates through the porous rock to reemerge at lower elevations as springs. Still, these carbonate-dominated mountains support a wider variety of conifers, such as white fir, Douglas-fir, and Engelmann spruce, and a greater diversity of understory species than other ranges in Nevada at similar elevations. Bristlecone pines have their widest distribution on carbonate substrates above 9,500 feet (2,900 m) elevation. Conditions do not favor alpine tundra, however; alpine plants are more limited than on the nearby granitic High Elevation Ruby Mountains.

=== Lahontan Uplands ===
The Lahontan Uplands ecoregion is restricted to the highest elevations of the mountain ranges within the Lahontan Salt Shrub Basin ecoregion. Slopes vary in elevation from 6,400 to 8,800 feet (2,000 to 2,700 m) and are covered by sagebrush, grasses, and scattered Utah juniper. Pinyon pine grows with juniper on the Stillwater Range and on Fairview Peak in the southeast portion of the Lahontan Basin, but it is otherwise absent from this ecoregion. Low sagebrush and black sagebrush grow to the mountaintops above the woodland zone. Cool season grasses, including bluebunch wheatgrass, dominate the understory in the north, but are replaced by warm season grasses, such as Indian ricegrass, in the south.

=== High-Elevation Ruby Mountains ===
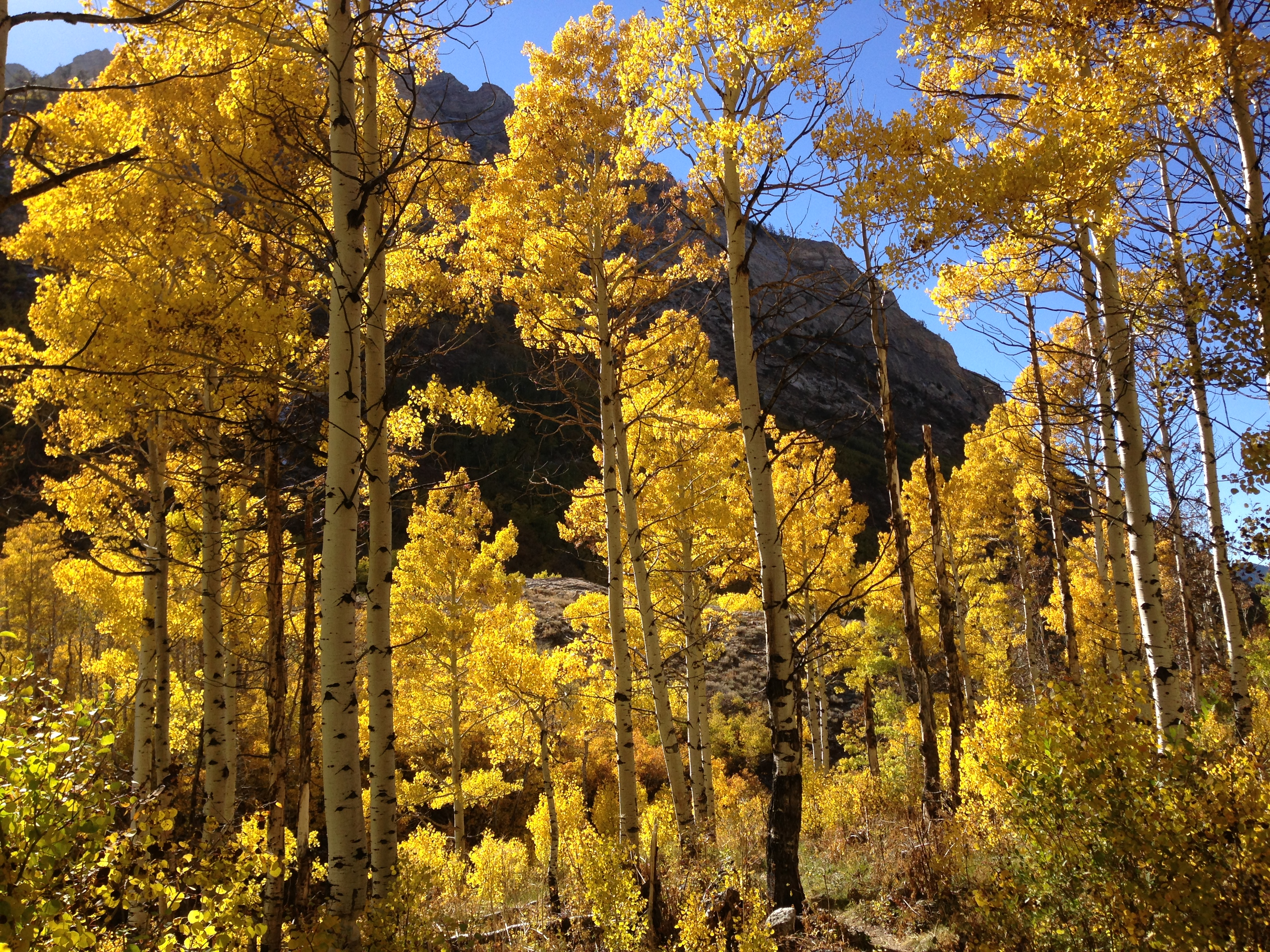
Aspens in Lamoille Canyon, Ruby Mountains

The High Elevation Ruby Mountains ecoregion represents those portions of the Ruby Mountains of Nevada that are dominated by granitic and metamorphic rock types, and that were heavily glaciated during the Pleistocene. Extensive periglacial phenomena, such as solifluction fields, are still active at higher elevations. Since the end of Pleistocene glaciation, closed-canopy conifer forests have not recolonized the Ruby Mountains, even though the Ruby Mountains receive more precipitation than the High Elevation Carbonate Mountains to the east. The High Elevation Ruby Mountains ecoregion is the wettest ecoregion in Nevada outside of the High Elevation Sierra Nevada. Some of the most extensive aspen groves in Nevada occur here. Subalpine meadows and scattered white fir, limber pine, and whitebark pine mingle upwards to the jagged, exposed peaks at elevations over 11,000 feet (3,400 m). Snowmelt moisture trapped by the impervious substrate supports extensive alpine meadows and alpine lakes are common. Wildlife includes mule deer, bighorn sheep, and mountain goats.

=== Carbonate Woodland ===
In the Carbonate Woodland Zone, the pinyon-juniper woodland canopy overtops and spans the existing sagebrush and mountain brush communities. The pinyon–juniper woodland has a broader elevational range in the carbonate areas of eastern Nevada than elsewhere in Great Basin montane forests, even extending onto the floors of the higher basins, partially because of greater summer precipitation. Both pinyon pine and juniper decline north of this ecoregion. In the Northern Basin and Range ecoregion, juniper grows alone and without distinct elevational banding. Historically, miners cut pinyon and juniper for mine timbers. Since the beginning of fire suppression early in the last century, juniper–pinyon woodland has increased in density and expanded into lower sagebrush zones. More recently, large areas of pinyon–juniper woodland have been cleared to increase forage for cattle. The woodland understory is diverse due to the influence of carbonate substrates and summer rainfall. There are more springs and live streams in this ecoregion than in western non-carbonate woodlands, because the carbonate substrate is soluble and porous, allowing rapid infiltration.

=== Tonopah Uplands ===
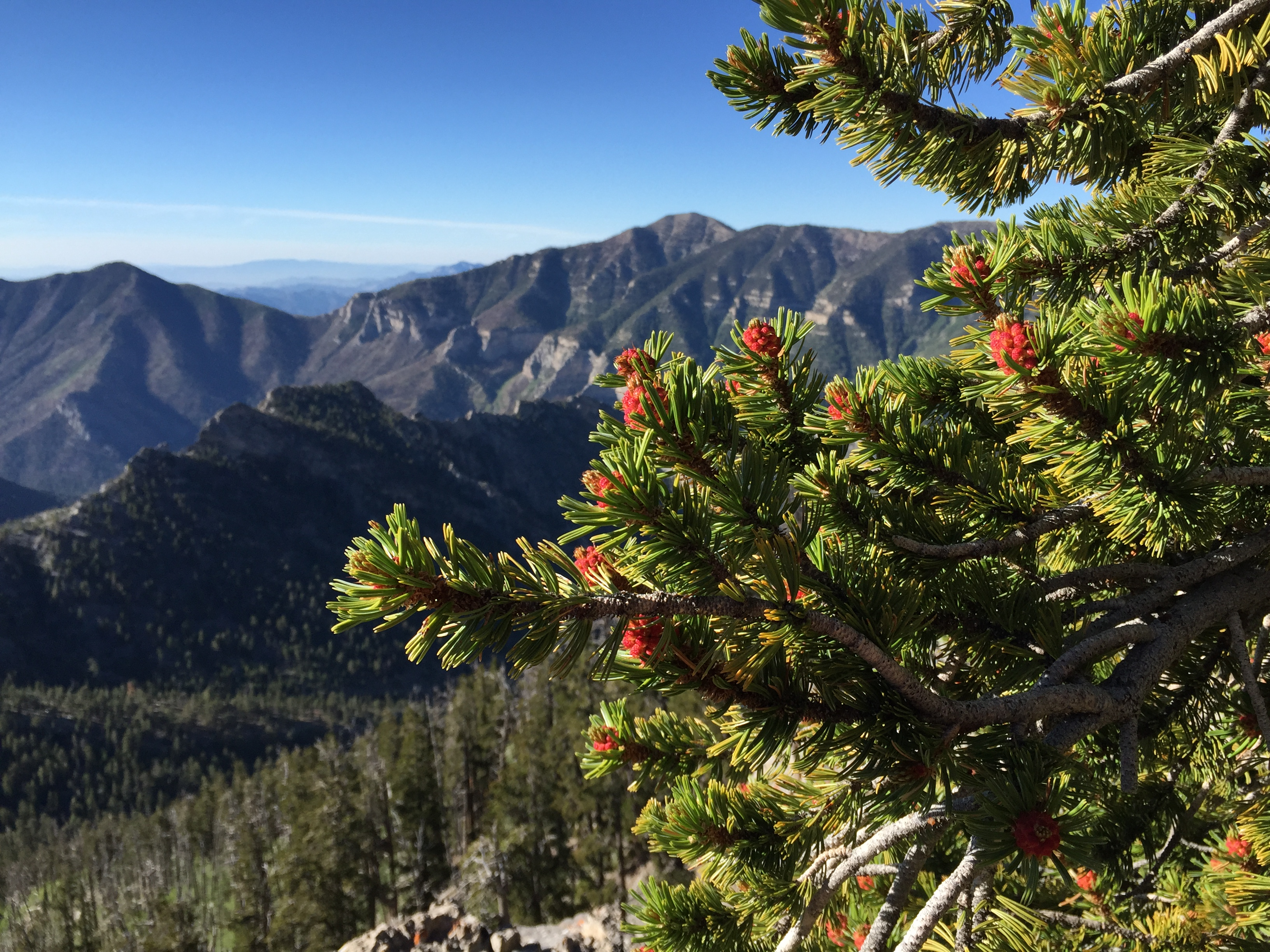
Bristlecone pine foliage and pollen cones, Spring Mountains, Nevada

The Tonopah Uplands ecoregion includes woodland- or shrub-covered hills and mountains ranging from 6,000 to 9,500 feet (1,800 to 2,900 m) in elevation. As elsewhere in the Tonopah region, Great Basin and Mojave Desert elements blend together especially toward the south and east, where some mountain brush and interior chaparral components, including Gambel oak, become more common. Pinyon-juniper woodland is extensive between 6,000 and 8,000 ft (1,800 and 2,400 m) elevation. The highest peaks support a few white fir, limber pine, or bristlecone pine.

== Preservation ==
Approximately 97% of this ecoregion's habitat is preserved, most of which is contained within the Humboldt–Toiyabe and Inyo National Forests. Smaller instances of this ecoregion are preserved within Death Valley and Great Basin National Parks.

== See also ==
- List of ecoregions in the United States (WWF)
- Great Basin shrub steppe — Deserts and xeric shrubland biome ecoregion (WWF)
- Northern Basin and Range ecoregion — Level III ecoregion (EPA)
