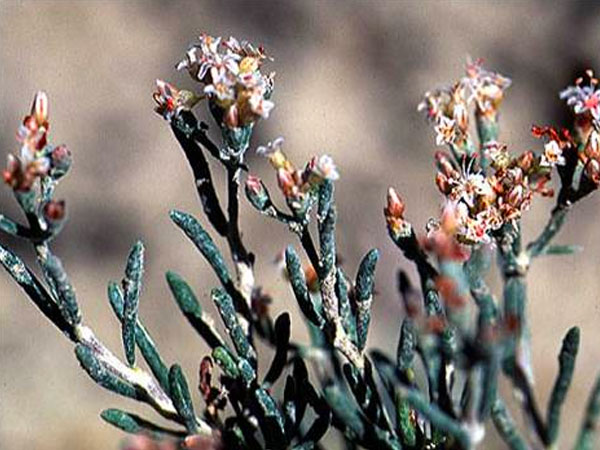

Conservation status
- Imperiled (NatureServe)

Scientific classification
- Kingdom: Plantae
- Clade: Embryophytes
- Clade: Tracheophytes
- Clade: Spermatophytes
- Clade: Angiosperms
- Clade: Eudicots
- Order: Caryophyllales
- Family: Polygonaceae
- Genus: Eriogonum
- Species: E. pelinophilum

Binomial name
- Eriogonum pelinophilum Reveal

= Eriogonum pelinophilum =

Species of wild buckwheat

Eriogonum pelinophilum is a rare species of wild buckwheat known by the common name clay-loving wild buckwheat. It is endemic to the state of Colorado in the United States, where it is known from only two counties. The most recent estimates available suggest there are 12 occurrences in existence for a total of about 278,000 individual plants in Delta and Montrose Counties. At least 7 occurrences observed in the past have not been relocated but are not yet believed extirpated. This plant is federally listed as an endangered species of the United States.

== Description ==
This is a subshrub with branches spreading wider than they grow tall, the plant reaching perhaps 12 centimeters tall by 40 wide. The woody stem bases emerge from a big taproot, and as they age the bark comes off in strips or plates. The upper branches are hairless or tufted with bits of hair. There are solitary leaves widely spaced on the branches. They are lance-shaped, no more than 1.5 centimeters long, and hairy on the undersides. The inflorescence is a small, dense cyme of flowers 2 or 3 centimeters long and packed with tiny whitish or cream-colored flowers. The flowers are pollinated by ants, of which 18 species have been observed on the plants.

== Taxonomy ==
=== Taxonomic history ===
This plant was first collected in 1958 but proved difficult to relocate in the wild. When it was finally found, Eriogonum expert James L. Reveal examined it in the field, compared it to the similar buckwheat Eriogonum contortum, and named it as a new species in 1973. Recent genetic analysis confirms that these two species and Eriogonum clavellatum are indeed similar but are 3 distinct species.

== Distribution and habitat ==
The clay-loving wild buckwheat is known only from the adobe clay hills and flats near Delta and Montrose, Colorado. All the occurrences can be found within an area of land 28.5 miles long by 11.5 miles wide. The substrate is pale whitish clay with an alkaline pH that originated from Cretaceous marine sediment. This is not generally a soil type that is hospitable to most plant life; it is very fine-grained, dense, compacted, rich in calcium carbonate, and prone to shrinking and swelling. The soil does not retain water, the pH is high, it is not easy for roots to penetrate, and there is little oxygen. The clay-loving wild buckwheat grows in areas where some moisture is retained, such as swales, where snow persists a bit longer. The habitat supports a few other plants that tolerate the landscape, including mat saltbrush (Atriplex corrugata) and black sagebrush (Artemisia nova), and another adobe-adapted local endemic, the adobe penstemon (Penstemon retrorsus). In most areas, the clay-loving buckwheat is the dominant species.

== Conservation ==
This plant has a limited distribution and is found only on a specific substrate. 75% of its habitat is on privately owned land with little protection. Its limited range is threatened by a number of forces. Nearby towns have experienced rapid growth, which has led to an expansion of residential areas with construction of houses, power lines and other utilities, and roads. The area lies within the Uncompahgre River Valley, which hosts agricultural operations fed by a number of canals and ditches. These have access roads. The construction and maintenance of the canals and roads create disturbance in the habitat and help introduce invasive plants to the area. Sediment scooped from the canals is dumped in the plant's habitat. About 40% of the plant's total habitat is affected by these activities. Off-road vehicle use damages the landscape by compacting and eroding soil, creating dust, fragmenting the habitat, and crushing individual plants. The adobe clay substrate is easily broken and eroded because it is bare and contains few plant roots to hold it together. ORV use is currently prohibited in much of the plant's habitat, but if federal protection was removed the threat would be greater.
