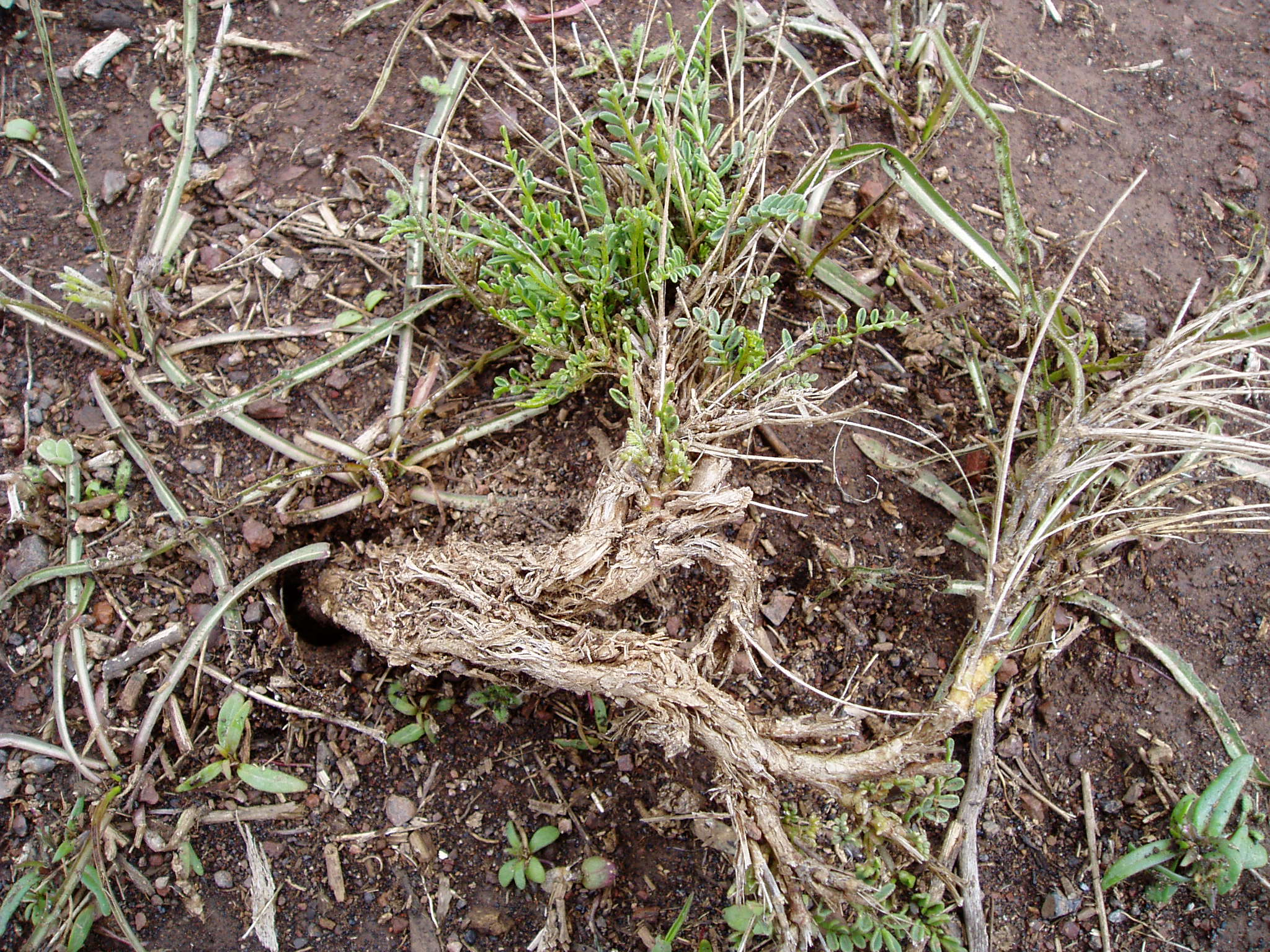

Conservation status
- Vulnerable (NatureServe)

Scientific classification
- Kingdom: Plantae
- Clade: Embryophytes
- Clade: Tracheophytes
- Clade: Spermatophytes
- Clade: Angiosperms
- Clade: Eudicots
- Clade: Rosids
- Order: Fabales
- Family: Fabaceae
- Subfamily: Faboideae
- Genus: Astragalus
- Species: A. yoder-williamsii

Binomial name
- Astragalus yoder-williamsii Barneby

= Astragalus yoder-williamsii =

Species of flowering plant

Astragalus yoder-williamsii, commonly known as the Osgood Mountains milkvetch, or mud-flat milkvetch, is a species of flowering plant in the family Fabaceae. It is a subshrub with leaflets, white flowers, and pod fruits. The species is native to the western United States.

Astragalus yoder-williamsii was described in 1980, and is considered Vulnerable by NatureServe.

== Taxonomy ==
The species was described by Rupert Charles Barneby in 1980.

== Distribution ==
Astragalus yoder-williamsii is native to the temperate biome of Idaho and Nevada, United States. It has been reported from Oregon, but this may be a false report. The species' overall range is 100–250 square kilometres (39–97 sq mi).

Astragalus yoder-williamsii grows in shrublands and chaparral, at elevations of 1,575–2,170 metres (5,167–7,119 ft). It is found on dry ridge crests, stony flats, and disturbed roads. The species is associated with Artemisia arbuscula and Artemisia tridentata.

== Description ==
Astragalus yoder-williamsii is a small perennial subshrub. It is densely tufted, and has a taproot. The stems are 1–3 centimetres (0.39–1.18 in) long.

The leaflets are 2.5–4.5 centimetres (0.98–1.77 in) long. The leaflets are arranged oppositely, or are scattered.

The inflorescence is a raceme with two to eight flowers. The stem of the inflorescence is 2–9 millimetres (0.079–0.354 in) long. The calyx is 2.3–3 millimetres (0.091–0.118 in) long. The calyx tube is bell-shaped, 1.4–2.2 millimetres (0.055–0.087 in) long, and 1.3–1.6 millimetres (0.051–0.063 in) wide. The tube has 0.5–1.1 millimetres (0.020–0.043 in) long teeth. The petals are whitish.

The fruit is a pod, which is pendulous, or confined among the leaf stems. The pod is elliptical, 4–7 millimetres (0.16–0.28 in) long, and 2–2.8 millimetres (0.079–0.110 in) wide. The fruit stalk is 1.2–3 millimetres (0.047–0.118 in) long. The seeds are 1.7–1.9 millimetres (0.067–0.075 in) long, and ochre to pale green in colour.

== Conservation ==
NatureServe lists Astragalus yoder-williamsii as Critically Imperiled in both Idaho and Nevada, but as Vulnerable overall. The population consists of 1000 to 2500 individuals. The species is threatened by mining, and the use of off-road vehicles.

In 1981, the species received an emergency listing of Endangered. This listing has expired.
