= Black sagebrush =

Black sagebrush is a common name for several flowering plants native to the western United States and may refer to:

- Artemisia arbuscula
- Artemisia nova
