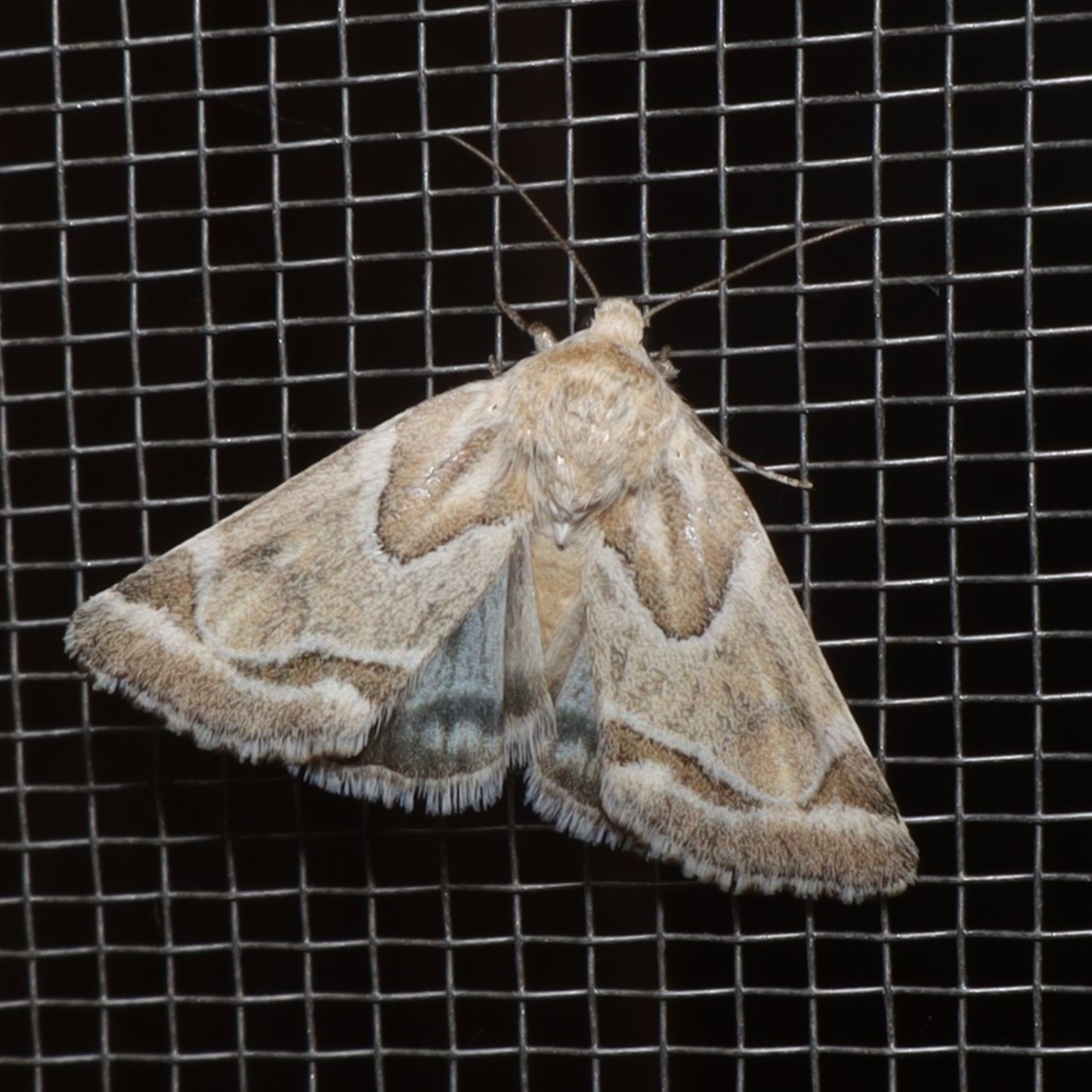
- Schinia acutilinea

Scientific classification
- Domain: Eukaryota
- Kingdom: Animalia
- Phylum: Arthropoda
- Class: Insecta
- Order: Lepidoptera
- Superfamily: Noctuoidea
- Family: Noctuidae
- Genus: Schinia
- Species: S. acutilinea

Binomial name
- Schinia acutilinea (Grote, 1878)

Synonyms
- Schinia separata (Grote, 1879); Schinia velutina Barnes & McDunnough, 1912

= Schinia acutilinea =

Species of moth

Schinia acutilinea, the angled gem or acute-lined flower moth, is a moth of the family Noctuidae. The species was first described by Augustus Radcliffe Grote in 1878. It is found in the dry southern portions of Saskatchewan, Alberta and British Columbia, south across the plains and Great Basin to southern Arizona and California.

Male specimen

The wingspan is 25–27 mm. Adults are on wing in August.

The larvae feed on Artemisia species, including Artemisia tridentata and Artemisia nova.

Schinia acutilinea was placed as a synonym of Schinia accessa by David F. Hardwick in 1996, but recent research by Michael G. Pogue indicates several species are included under this name.
