= Penstemon retrorsus =

Conservation status
- Vulnerable (NatureServe)

Scientific classification
- Kingdom: Plantae
- Clade: Embryophytes
- Clade: Tracheophytes
- Clade: Spermatophytes
- Clade: Angiosperms
- Clade: Eudicots
- Clade: Asterids
- Order: Lamiales
- Family: Plantaginaceae
- Genus: Penstemon
- Species: P. retrorsus

Binomial name
- Penstemon retrorsus Payson

Plant species in the veronica family

Penstemon retrorsus, the adobe penstemon, is a rare species of penstemon only found along parts of Uncompahgre and Gunnison rivers in western Colorado. It grows on largely barren slopes of a shale deposit where not many plants are able to survive.

== Description ==
Adobe penstemons grow a mat of stems and leaves that produce flowering stems. The flowering stems grow 10 to 20 centimeters (4 to 8 in) tall and can grow straight upwards or have a curve at the base. It has a short and woody caudex that gives rise to the basal rosettes and stems. The stems and leaves are all covered in fine hairs giving them a quite gray, ashy coloration.

The basal leaves and the lowest leaves on the stems are small, 5–21 millimeters long and just 1–4 mm wide. They are spatulate to oblanceolate in shape, resembling a spoon or the reversed head of a spear, with the base tapering and the end round to very broadly pointed. Each flowering stem has two to four pairs of leaves with the leaves higher up on the flowering stems averaging larger in size at 8–30 mm long and 2–5 mm wide with the same range of shapes, but they may end in a wide or narrow point and can have a mucronate tip. The leaves are light green and do not have visible veins or toothed edges.

The upper portion of the flowering stems is the inflorescence measuring 3 to 12 cm (1.2 to 4.7 in) with flowers pointing in all directions away from the stem. Though the flowers appear continuous they are in four to twelve groups of one or two cymes, each with one to four flowers. Immediately under each group of flower there are two bracts that are oblanceolate and 11–22 mm long. The flowers are small and somewhat blue-purple. They are funnel shaped tubes with reddish violet floral guide lines inside and two white ridges on the lower side of the tube. The length of the flower is 16–20 mm and they are covered in glandular hairs on the outside and have some white hairs on the lower side of the tube internally. The three lower lobes measure 3–5 mm while the upper two lobes are 2.5–3 mm and project forward. The four stamens do not extend out of the mouth flowers while the staminode covered in bright yellow-orange hairs can reach the mouth or be short, measuring 7–9 mm.

The size of its seed capsules has not been recorded.

== Taxonomy ==
Penstemon retrorsus was scientifically described and named by Edwin Blake Payson in 1920. Payson collected the type specimen near Montrose, Colorado on 15 June 1915. It is classified as part of the genus Penstemon within the family Plantaginaceae. It has no botanical synonyms.

=== Names ===
The species name retrorsus means "turned backwards" in Botanical Latin; it was given this name for the many hairs covering the stems and leaves that point backwards. However, the hairs are very small and this feature can only be seen using magnification. Penstemon retrorsus is known by the common name adobe penstemon. It is also known as adobe beardtongue and adobe hills beardtongue.

== Range and habitat ==
Only 38 populations of the species are known, all located in Delta and Montrose counties. All known populations are from one 24 km (15 mi) long area along the northern fork of the Gunnison River and the Uncompahgre River. It is found at elevations of 1,500 to 2,500 meters (4,900 to 8,200 ft).

It grows on hills of Mancos Shale which tend to be sparsely covered in plant life. The growing conditions in these areas is alkaline with a high clay content. It is associated with sagebrush, saltbush, and pinyon-juniper woodlands. On the mancos shale it occurs with other clay adapted species such as mat saltbush (Atriplex corrugata), black sagebrush (Artemisia nova), shadscale (Atriplex confertifolia), Gardner's saltbush (Atriplex gardneri), clay-loving wild-buckwheat (Eriogonum pelinophilum), budsage (Picrothamnus desertorum), and charming woodyaster (Xylorhiza venusta). In its specialized habitat it tend to grow in areas of the shale where there is more moisture such as on the north sides of hills or in areas that concentrate rain runoff.

=== Conservation ===
The adobe penstemon was evaluated by NatureServe in 1997 and rated as vulnerable at both the global and state level. Development was not impacting the species much other than off-road vehicle recreation, but they will have to endure rising temperatures due to global warming.

== Uses ==
Although it is difficult to cultivate, adobe penstemons are grown in dry rock gardens. It is propagated by seed and requires twelve weeks of cold, moist stratification for good germination.
