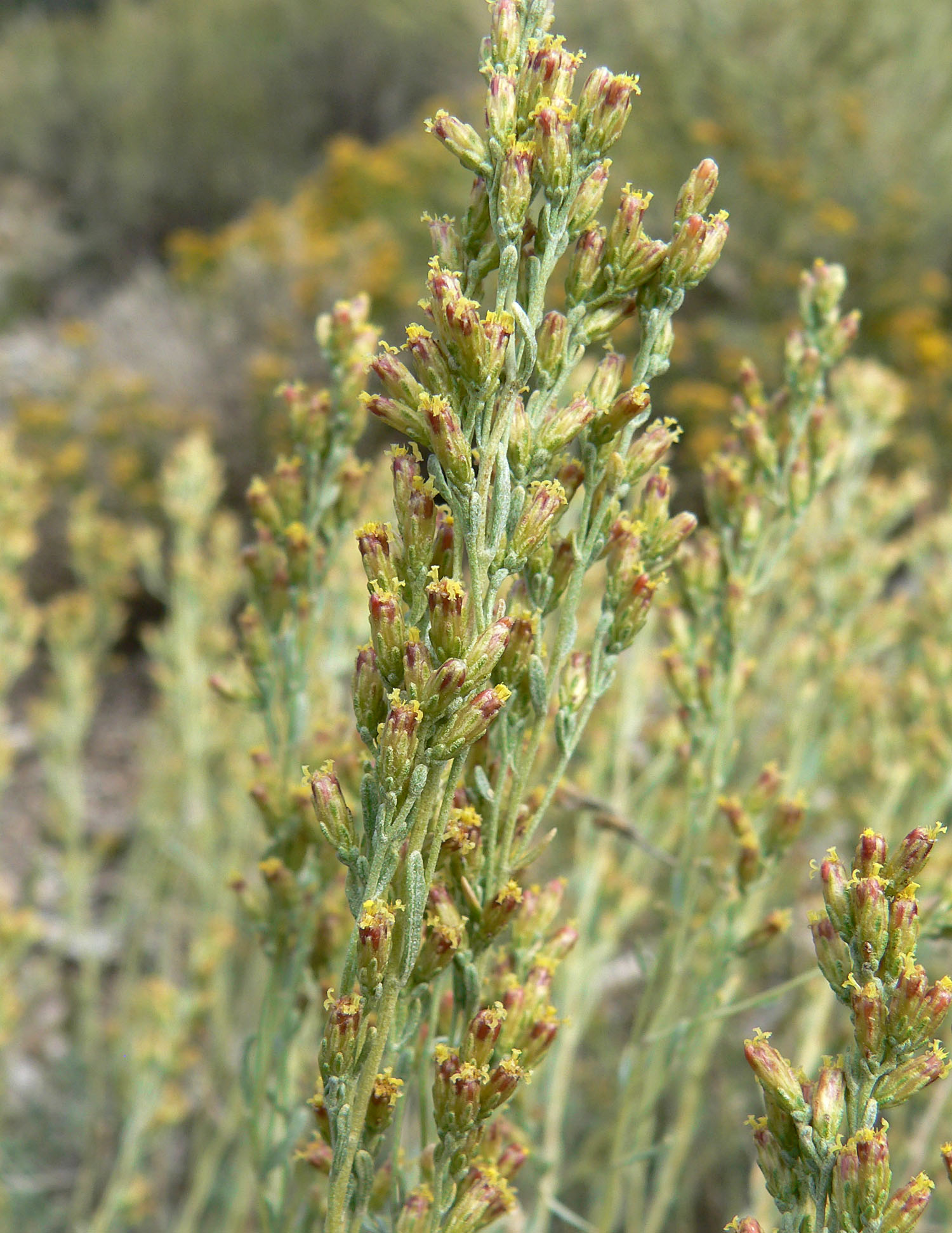

Conservation status
- Secure (NatureServe)

Scientific classification
- Kingdom: Plantae
- Clade: Tracheophytes
- Clade: Angiosperms
- Clade: Eudicots
- Clade: Asterids
- Order: Asterales
- Family: Asteraceae
- Genus: Artemisia
- Species: A. nova

Binomial name
- Artemisia nova A.Nels.

Synonyms
- Seriphidium novum (A.Nelson) W.A.Weber

= Artemisia nova =

Species of flowering plant

Artemisia nova is a North American species of sagebrush, known by the common name black sagebrush. It is "one of the most common shrubs in the western United States".

== Distribution and habitat ==
The native range of Artemisia nova is from the Mojave Desert mountains in southern California and in the Great Basin of Nevada and Utah, north to Oregon, Idaho and Montana, east to Wyoming and Colorado, and south to Arizona and northwestern New Mexico.

It grows in forest, woodland, and grassland habitats, often on calcareous soils.

== Taxonomy ==
Identification is sometimes difficult, because this species is similar in appearance to Little sagebrush, Artemisia arbuscula, and it easily hybridizes with Big sagebrush, Artemisia tridentata, when it grows in the same area, leading to intermediate forms.

Also, Artemisia nova has two main morphological forms, a darker, easily recognized form, and a less common light gray-green colored variant which closely resembles other sagebrush species.

== Description ==
In general, Artemisia nova is a small, erect shrub producing upright stems branched off a central trunklike base. It is usually no taller than 20 to 30 centimeters but it has been known to exceed 70 centimeters in height.

The aromatic leaves are green, short, narrow, and sometimes toothed at the tip. This species can sometimes be distinguished from its similar-looking relatives by glandular hairs on its leaves.

The inflorescence bears clusters of flower heads lined with shiny, oily, yellow-green phyllaries with transparent tips. The fruit is a tiny achene up to a millimeter long.

The plant reproduces from seed except in very rare occasions when it reproduces vegetatively by layering.
