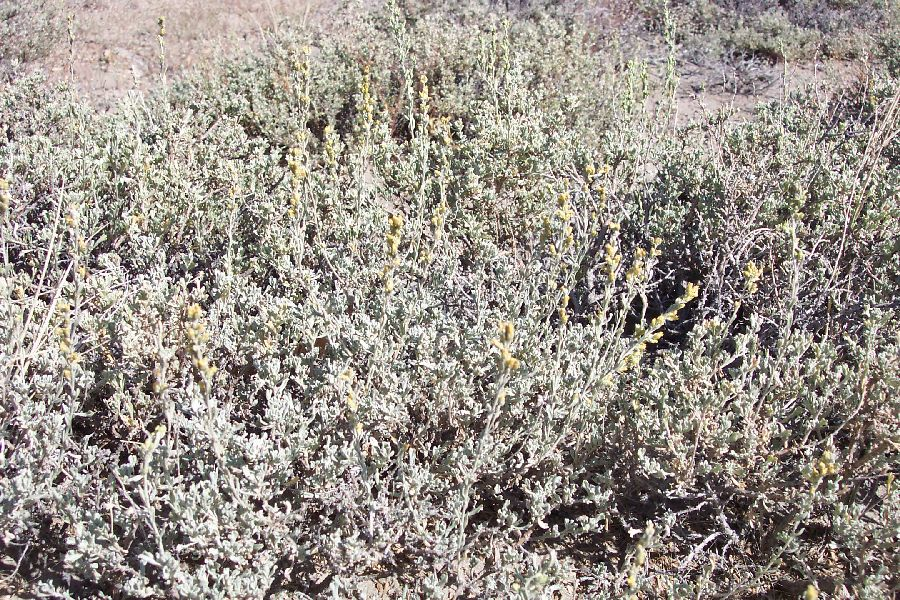

Conservation status
- Secure (NatureServe)

Scientific classification
- Kingdom: Plantae
- Clade: Tracheophytes
- Clade: Angiosperms
- Clade: Eudicots
- Clade: Asterids
- Order: Asterales
- Family: Asteraceae
- Genus: Artemisia
- Species: A. arbuscula

Binomial name
- Artemisia arbuscula Nutt.

Synonyms
- Serphidium arbusculum (Nutt.) W.A.Weber; Artemisia longiloba (Osterh.) Beetle, syn of subsp. longiloba

= Artemisia arbuscula =

Species of flowering plant

Artemisia arbuscula is a North American species of sagebrush known by the common names little sagebrush, low sagebrush, or black sagebrush. It is native to the western United States from Washington, Oregon, and California east as far as Colorado and Wyoming. It grows in open, exposed habitat on dry, sterile soils high in rock and clay content.

== Description ==
Artemisia arbuscula is a gray-green to gray shrub forming mounds generally no higher than 30 centimetres (12 in). Its many branches are covered in hairy leaves each less than a centimeter long. The inflorescence is a spike-shaped array of clusters of hairy flower heads. Each head contains a few pale yellow disc florets but no ray florets. The fruit is a tiny achene less than a millimeter wide.

Subspecies

- Artemisia arbuscula subsp. arbuscula
- Artemisia arbuscula subsp. longiloba (Osterh.) L.M.Shultz
- Artemisia arbuscula subsp. thermopola Beetle - Idaho, Utah, Wyoming

=== Galls ===
This species is host to the following insect induced galls:

- Eutreta diana (Osten Sacken, 1877) fly stem gall
- Rhopalomyia conica
- Rhopalomyia medusa Gagné, 1983 Sagebrush Medusa Gall Midge
- Rhopalomyia obovata Gagné, 1983
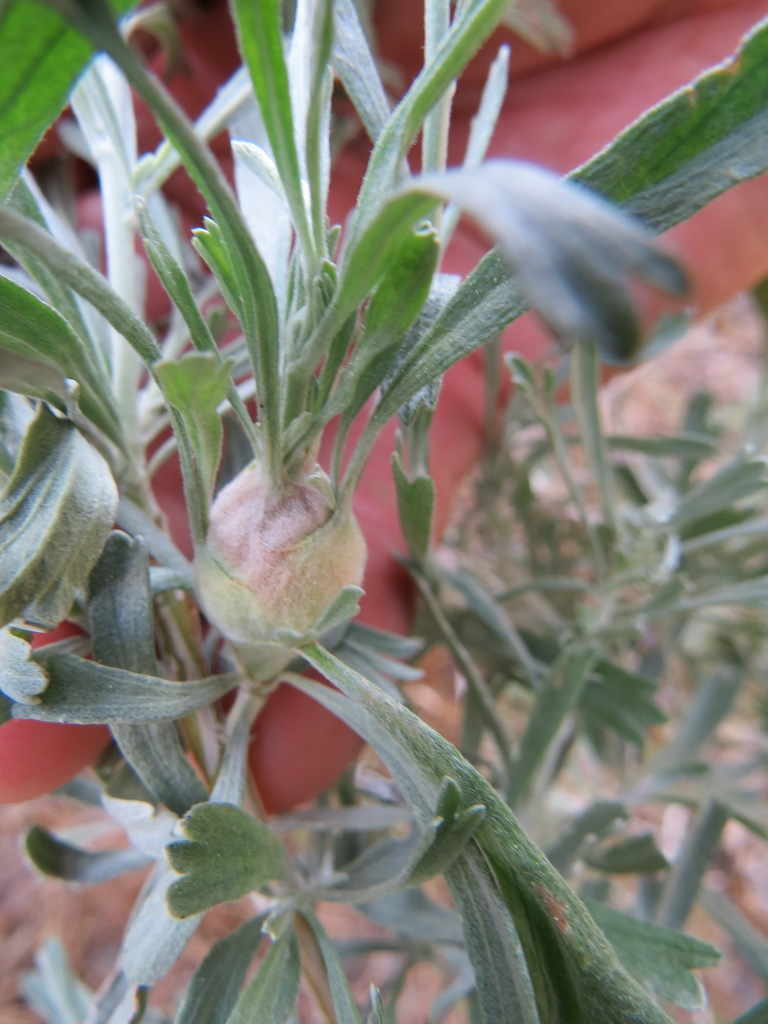
Eutreta diana gall

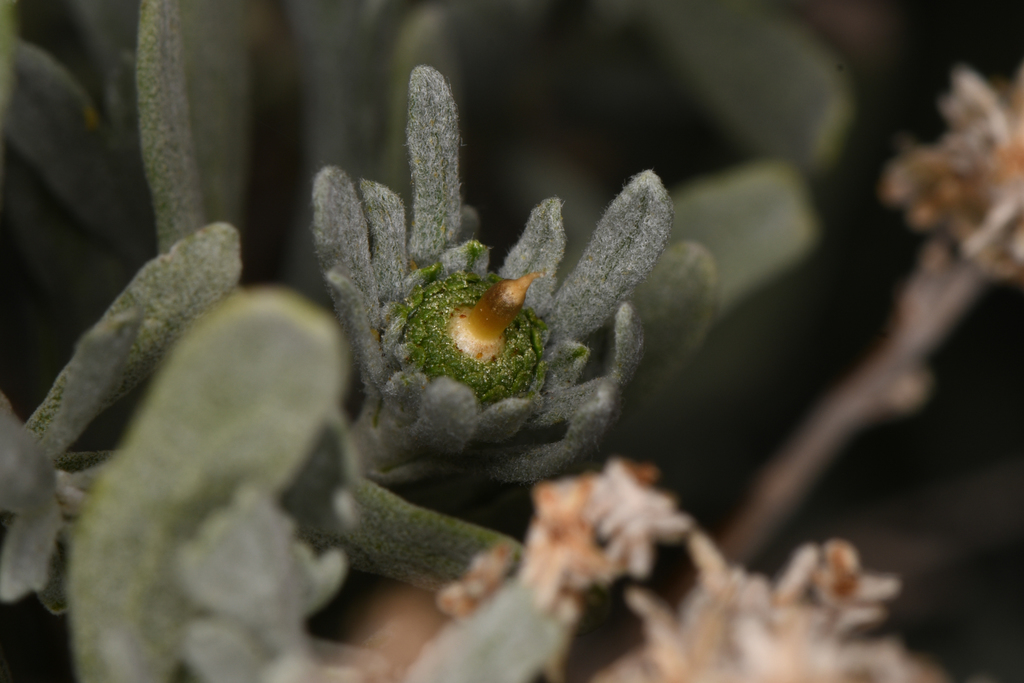
Rhopalomyia conica gall

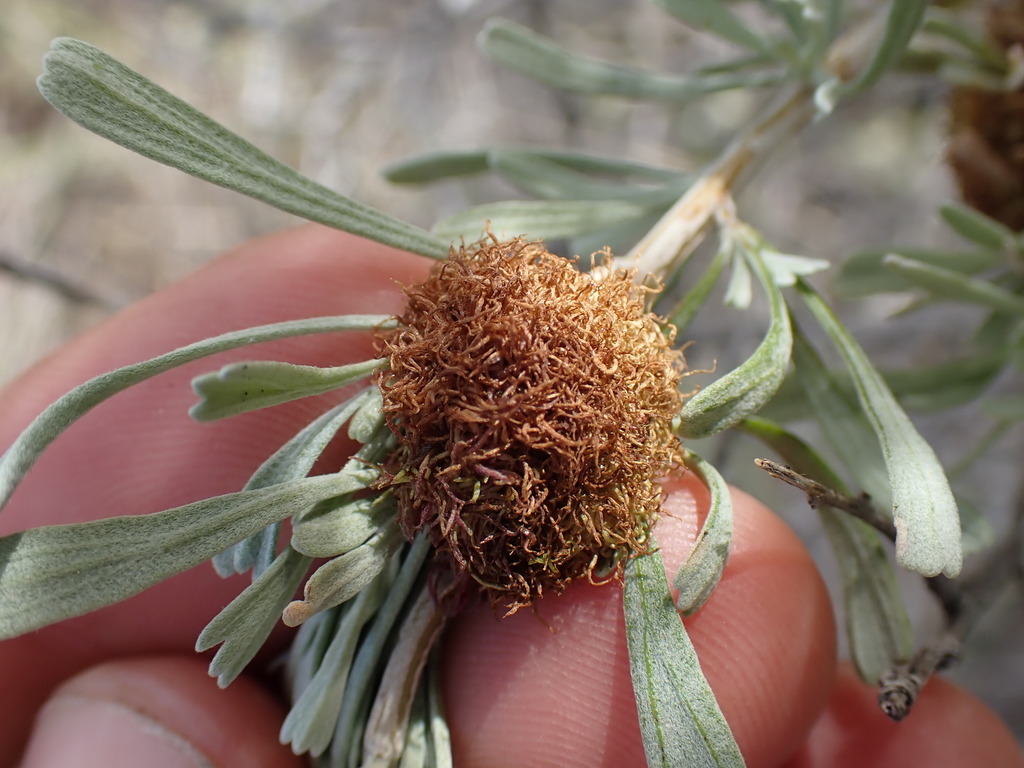
Rhopalomyia medusa gall
