= List of Astragalus species =

As of April 2023, Plants of the World Online accepted over 3,000 species in the genus Astragalus.

== A ==
- Astragalus aaronii (Eig) Zohary
- Astragalus aaronsohnianus Eig
- Astragalus abadehensis Maassoumi & Podlech
- Astragalus abbreviatus Kar. & Kir.
- Astragalus aberrans Förther & Podlech
- Astragalus abharensis Maassoumi & Podlech
- Astragalus abnormalis Rech.f.
- Astragalus abolinii Popov
- Astragalus aboriginorum Richardson
- Astragalus absconditus Zarre & Podlech
- Astragalus absentivus Maassoumi
- Astragalus acanthocarpus Boriss.
- Astragalus acanthochristianopsis Rech.f. & Köie
- Astragalus acaulis Baker
- Astragalus acceptus Podlech & L.R.Xu
- Astragalus accidens S.Watson
- Astragalus acetabulosus C.C.Towns.
- Astragalus achundovii Grossh.
- Astragalus acicularis Bunge
- Astragalus acikirensis (Ekim) Aytaç & Hamzaoğlu
- Astragalus ackerbergensis Freyn
- Astragalus ackermanii Barneby
- Astragalus acmonotrichus Fenzl
- Astragalus acmophylloides Grossh.
- Astragalus acmophyllus Bunge
- Astragalus acormosus Basil.
- Astragalus acutifolius Bunge
- Astragalus acutirostris S.Watson
- Astragalus adanus A.Nelson
- Astragalus adiyamanensis Podlech & Ekici
- Astragalus admirabilus Pjak & E.Pjak
- Astragalus adpreseipilosus Gontsch.
- Astragalus adulterinus Podlech
- Astragalus adunciformis Boiss.
- Astragalus aduncus Willd.
- Astragalus adylovii F.O.Khass., Ergashev & Kadyrov
- Astragalus adzharicus Popov
- Astragalus aegobromus Boiss. & Hohen.
- Astragalus aemulans (Nevski) Gontsch.
- Astragalus aequalis Clokey
- Astragalus aestimabilis Podlech
- Astragalus aestivorum Podlech
- Astragalus affinis Podlech & Zarre
- Astragalus afghanomontanus Širj. & Rech.f.
- Astragalus aflatunensis B.Fedtsch.
- Astragalus agassii Manden.
- Astragalus agnicidus Barneby
- Astragalus agraniotii Orph. ex Boiss.
- Astragalus agrestis Douglas ex G.Don
- Astragalus ahangarensis Zarre & Podlech
- Astragalus aharicus Maassoumi & Podlech
- Astragalus ahmad-parsae Maassoumi
- Astragalus ahmed-adlii Bornm. & Gauba
- Astragalus ahouicus Parsa
- Astragalus aintabicus Boiss.
- Astragalus aiwadzhi B.Fedtsch.
- Astragalus ajfreidii Aitch. & Baker
- Astragalus akhanii Podlech
- Astragalus akhundzadahensis Podlech & Zarre
- Astragalus akkensis Coss.
- Astragalus akmanii Aytaç & H.Duman
- Astragalus aksaicus Schischk.
- Astragalus aksaricus Pavlov
- Astragalus aksuensis Bunge
- Astragalus aktauensis Gontsch.
- Astragalus aktiubensis Sytin
- Astragalus alaarczensis Vassilcz.
- Astragalus alabugensis B.Fedtsch.
- Astragalus aladagensis Ekící & Podlech
- Astragalus alaicus Freyn
- Astragalus alamkuhensis Maassoumi
- Astragalus alamliensis Rech.f.
- Astragalus alamouticus Maassoumi
- Astragalus alaschanus Bunge ex Maxim.
- Astragalus alatavicus Kar. & Kir.
- Astragalus alavaanus Podlech
- Astragalus albens Greene
- Astragalus alberti Bunge
- Astragalus albertoregelia C.Winkl. & B.Fedtsch.
- Astragalus albertshoferi Podlech
- Astragalus albicalycinus Hub.-Mor. & V.A.Matthews
- Astragalus albicans Bong.
- Astragalus albicaulis DC.
- Astragalus albispinus Širj. & Bornm.
- Astragalus albovillosus Kitam.
- Astragalus albulus Wooton & Standl.
- Astragalus albus Širj.
- Astragalus aleppicus Boiss.
- Astragalus alexeenkoanus B.Fedtsch. & N.A.Ivanova
- Astragalus alexeenkoi Gontsch.
- Astragalus alexejii Gontsch.
- Astragalus algarbiensis Coss. ex Bunge
- Astragalus algerianus E.Sheld.
- Astragalus alhamedensis Rech.f.
- Astragalus aliomranii Maassoumi
- Astragalus alitschuri O.Fedtsch.
- Astragalus allectus Maassoumi
- Astragalus allochrous A.Gray
- Astragalus allotricholobus Nabiev
- Astragalus aloisii I.Deml
- Astragalus alopecias Pall.
- Astragalus alopecuroides L.
- Astragalus alopecurus Pall.
- Astragalus alpamarcae A.Gray
- Astragalus alpinus L.
- Astragalus altaicola Podlech
- Astragalus altanii Hub.-Mor.
- Astragalus altimontanus Podlech & Maassoumi
- Astragalus altimurensis I.Deml
- Astragalus altiusculus Maassoumi & Ghahrem.
- Astragalus altus Wooton & Standl.
- Astragalus alvordensis M.E.Jones
- Astragalus alyssoides Lam.
- Astragalus amabilis Popov
- Astragalus amalecitanus Boiss.
- Astragalus amarus Pall.
- Astragalus amatus Clos
- Astragalus ambigens Popov
- Astragalus amblolepis Fisch.
- Astragalus amblytropis Barneby
- Astragalus ameghinoi Speg.
- Astragalus americanus (Hook.) M.E.Jones
- Astragalus amherstianus Benth.
- Astragalus ammodendroides Bornm. ex Podlech & Zarre
- Astragalus ammodendron Bunge
- Astragalus ammodytes Pall.
- Astragalus ammophilus Kar. & Kir.
- Astragalus ammotrophus Bunge
- Astragalus amnis-amissi Barneby
- Astragalus amoenus Fenzl
- Astragalus amphioxys A.Gray
- Astragalus ampullarioides (S.L.Welsh) S.L.Welsh
- Astragalus ampullarius S.Watson
- Astragalus amygdalinus Bunge
- Astragalus anacamptoides Širj. & Rech.f.
- Astragalus anacamptus Bunge
- Astragalus anachoreticus Podlech
- Astragalus ancistrocarpus Boiss. & Hausskn.
- Astragalus andabaddensis Maassoumi, Bagheri & F.Ghahrem.
- Astragalus andabilensis Ranjbar & Mahmoudian
- Astragalus andalanicus Boiss. & Hausskn.
- Astragalus andaulgensis B.Fedtsch.
- Astragalus andersianus Podlech
- Astragalus andersonii A.Gray
- Astragalus andrasovszkyi Bornm.
- Astragalus andreji Rzazade
- Astragalus andreji-sytinii Podlech
- Astragalus androssovianus Gontsch.
- Astragalus anemophilus Greene
- Astragalus anfractuosus Bunge
- Astragalus angarensis Turcz. ex Bunge
- Astragalus angreni Lipsky
- Astragalus angulosus DC.
- Astragalus anguranensis Podlech & Maassoumi
- Astragalus angustiflorus K.Koch
- Astragalus angustifolius Lam.
- Astragalus angustissimus Bunge
- Astragalus angustistipulatus Podlech
- Astragalus animaqingshanicus Y.H.Wu
- Astragalus anisacanthus Boiss.
- Astragalus anisomerus Bunge
- Astragalus anisus M.E.Jones
- Astragalus ankylotus Fisch. & C.A.Mey.
- Astragalus anni-novi Burkart
- Astragalus annularis Forssk.
- Astragalus anodiophilus Zarre & Podlech
- Astragalus anserinifolius Boiss.
- Astragalus anserinus N.D.Atwood, Goodrich & S.L.Welsh
- Astragalus ansinii Uzun, Terzioğlu & Pal.-Uzun
- Astragalus antabicus Boiss.
- Astragalus antalyensis A.Duran & Podlech
- Astragalus antheliophorus I.Deml
- Astragalus anthosphaerus Rech.f. & Gilli
- Astragalus anthylloides Lam.
- Astragalus antilibani Bunge
- Astragalus antiochianus Post
- Astragalus antoninae Grig.
- Astragalus aparanensis Podlech
- Astragalus aphanassjievii Gontsch.
- Astragalus apiculatus Gontsch.
- Astragalus apollineus Boiss.
- Astragalus applegatei M.Peck (orth. var. Astragalus applegatii)
- Astragalus apricus Bunge
- Astragalus aqrabatensis Podlech
- Astragalus aquilanus Anzal.
- Astragalus aquilonius (Barneby) Barneby
- Astragalus arasbaranensis Maassoumi & Ranjbar
- Astragalus arbuscula Pall.
- Astragalus arcanus Knjaz., Krivenko & E.G.Philippov
- Astragalus archibaldii Podlech
- Astragalus arcuatus Kar. & Kir.
- Astragalus ardahalicus Parsa
- Astragalus arenarius L.
- Astragalus arequipensis Vogel
- Astragalus aretioides (M.E.Jones) Barneby
- Astragalus argaeus Boiss. & Balansa
- Astragalus arganaticus Bunge
- Astragalus argentinus Hauman
- Astragalus argentocalyx Ali ex Podlech
- Astragalus argentophyllus Taeb & Uzunh.
- Astragalus argophyllus Nutt.
- Astragalus arguricus Bunge
- Astragalus argutensis Bunge
- Astragalus argyroides Beck
- Astragalus argyrostachyus Boiss.
- Astragalus argyrothamnos Boiss.
- Astragalus arianus Gontsch.
- Astragalus aridovallicola P.C.Li
- Astragalus aridus A.Gray
- Astragalus arizonicus A.Gray
- Astragalus arkalycensis Bunge
- Astragalus armatus Willd.
- Astragalus armeniacus Boiss.
- Astragalus arnacantha M.Bieb.
- Astragalus arnacanthoides (Boriss.) Boriss.
- Astragalus arnoldi Hemsl. & H.Pearson
- Astragalus arnoldianus N.D.Simpson
- Astragalus arnottianus (Gillies ex Hook. & Arn.) Macloskie
- Astragalus arpilobus Kar. & Kir.
- Astragalus arrectus A.Gray
- Astragalus artemisiiformis Rassulova
- Astragalus arthuri M.E.Jones
- Astragalus arvatensis Gontsch.
- Astragalus arvetii Coulot, Rabaute, J.-M.Tison, van Es & Villaret
- Astragalus asaphes Bunge
- Astragalus aschuturi B.Fedtsch.
- Astragalus asciocalyx Bunge
- Astragalus asclepiadoides M.E.Jones
- Astragalus ashtianensis Podlech & Maassoumi
- Astragalus askaleensis Hamzaoğlu
- Astragalus askius Bunge
- Astragalus aslujensis Eig
- Astragalus asotinensis Björk & Fishbein
- Astragalus aspadanus Bunge
- Astragalus asper Jacq.
- Astragalus aspindzicus Manden. & Chinth.
- Astragalus asplundii I.M.Johnst.
- Astragalus aspreticola Podlech
- Astragalus assadabadensis F.Ghahrem. & Podlech
- Astragalus assadii Maassoumi & Podlech
- Astragalus asterias Steven
- Astragalus astrachanicus Sytin & Laktionov
- Astragalus asymmetricus E.Sheld.
- Astragalus athranthus Podlech & L.R.Xu
- Astragalus atraphaxifolius Rassulova
- Astragalus atratus S.Watson
- Astragalus atricapillus Bornm.
- Astragalus atrifructus Greuter & Burdet
- Astragalus atrokurdicus Maassoumi, F.Ghahrem., Bagheri & Podlech
- Astragalus atropilosulus (Hochst.) Bunge
- Astragalus atropubescens J.M.Coult. & Fisher
- Astragalus atrovinosus Popov
- Astragalus atwoodii S.L.Welsh & Thorne
- Astragalus aucheri Boiss.
- Astragalus auganus Bunge
- Astragalus aulieatensis Popov
- Astragalus aurantiacus Hand.-Mazz.
- Astragalus auratus Gontsch.
- Astragalus aureus Willd.
- Astragalus austiniae A.Gray ex W.H.Brewer & S.Watson
- Astragalus australis (L.) Lam.
- Astragalus austriacus Jacq.
- Astragalus austroaegaeus Rech.f.
- Astragalus austroaltaicus Popov ex Knjaz.
- Astragalus austroargentinus Gómez-Sosa
- Astragalus austrodarvasicus Rassulova
- Astragalus austrodshungaricus Golosk.
- Astragalus austroferganicus Kamelin & V.M.Vinogr.
- Astragalus austrokhorasanicus Podlech
- Astragalus austromahneshanensis F.Ghahrem., Maassoumi & Bagheri
- Astragalus austrosachalinensis N.S.Pavlova
- Astragalus austrotadzhikistanicus Czerep.
- Astragalus austrotaromensis Maassoumi, F.Ghahrem., Bagheri & Podlech
- Astragalus austrotibetanus Podlech & L.R.Xu
- Astragalus austrouralensis Kulikov
- Astragalus autrani Bald.
- Astragalus avajensis Podlech
- Astragalus avicennicus Parsa
- Astragalus ayatollahii Nasseh, Joharchi & F.Ghahrem.
- Astragalus aybarsii H.Duman & Aytaç
- Astragalus aydosensis Peșmen & Erik
- Astragalus aytatchii Akan & Civelek
- Astragalus azizii Maassoumi
- Astragalus aznabjurticus Grossh.
- Astragalus aznaicus Podlech & Maassoumi
- Astragalus azraqensis C.C.Towns.

== B ==
- Astragalus baba-alliar Parsa
- Astragalus babacianum Ertekin
- Astragalus babakhanloui Maassoumi & Podlech
- Astragalus babatagi Popov
- Astragalus bachardenii Kamelin & Kovalevsk.
- Astragalus bachmarensis Grossh.
- Astragalus bactrianus Fisch.
- Astragalus badamensis Popov
- Astragalus badghysi Popov
- Astragalus baeri Sytin & Laktionov
- Astragalus baerlukensis L.R.Xu, Zhao Y.Chang & Xiao L.Liu
- Astragalus baftensis Ranjbar & Maassoumi
- Astragalus baghlanensis I.Deml
- Astragalus baharensis Ghahrem.
- Astragalus bahcesarayensis Akan, Fırat & Ekici
- Astragalus bahrakianus Grey-Wilson
- Astragalus baibutensis Bunge
- Astragalus baionensis Loisel.
- Astragalus baissunensis Lipsky
- Astragalus baitagensis Sanchir ex N.Ulziykh.
- Astragalus bajgiranensis Podlech
- Astragalus bakaliensis Bunge
- Astragalus bakirdaghensis Podlech
- Astragalus bakuensis Bunge
- Astragalus balchanensis Boriss.
- Astragalus balchaschensis Sumnev.
- Astragalus baldaccii Degen
- Astragalus baldshuanicus Popov
- Astragalus balearicus Chater
- Astragalus balkaricus Sytin
- Astragalus bamianicus Podlech
- Astragalus baotouensis H.C.Fu
- Astragalus baraftabensis Maassoumi & Podlech
- Astragalus baranovii Popov
- Astragalus barba-jovis DC.
- Astragalus barba-mosis Ehrenb. ex Fisch.
- Astragalus barbatus Lam.
- Astragalus barbidens Freyn
- Astragalus barboides Zarre & H.Duman
- Astragalus barclayanus Podlech
- Astragalus bardsiricus Parsa
- Astragalus barnasariformis Maassoumi, F.Ghahrem. & Bagheri
- Astragalus barnassari Grossh.
- Astragalus barrii Barneby
- Astragalus bartinense Aytaç, Tunçkol & N.Aksoy
- Astragalus bashanensis Q.L.Gan, Xin W.Li & S.Z.Xu
- Astragalus bashgalensis Podlech
- Astragalus bashkalensis D.F.Chamb.
- Astragalus bashmaghensis Maassoumi & Podlech
- Astragalus bashmensis Maassoumi
- Astragalus basiflorus E.Peter
- Astragalus basilicus Maassoumi & Podlech
- Astragalus basilii Kamelin & Kovalevsk.
- Astragalus basineri Trautv.
- Astragalus batangensis E.Peter
- Astragalus bavanatensis Maassoumi, Nowroozi & Podlech
- Astragalus baxoiensis Podlech & L.R.Xu
- Astragalus baytopianus D.F.Chamb. & V.A.Matthews
- Astragalus bazarganii Podlech & Zarre
- Astragalus bazmanicus Podlech
- Astragalus beathii Ced.Porter
- Astragalus beatleyae Barneby
- Astragalus beckerianus Trautv.
- Astragalus beckii Bornm.
- Astragalus beckwithii Torr. & A.Gray
- Astragalus beitashanensis W.Chai & P.Yan
- Astragalus bejourensis Podlech & Maassoumi
- Astragalus beketowii (Krasn.) B.Fedtsch.
- Astragalus belangeri (Kuntze) Podlech
- Astragalus belcheraghensis Podlech
- Astragalus belgheisicoides Podlech & Maassoumi
- Astragalus belgheisicus Maassoumi
- Astragalus bellus (Kuntze) R.E.Fr.
- Astragalus bergii Hieron.
- Astragalus bernardinus M.E.Jones
- Astragalus berteroanus (Moris) Reiche
- Astragalus berteroi Colla
- Astragalus berytheus Boiss. & C.I.Blanche
- Astragalus berytius Bunge
- Astragalus bethlehemiticus Boiss.
- Astragalus beypazaricus Podlech & Aytaç
- Astragalus bezudensis Širj. & Rech.f.
- Astragalus bhotanensis Baker
- Astragalus biabanensis Širj. & Rech.f.
- Astragalus biarjmandicus Podlech & Zarre
- Astragalus bibullatus Barneby & E.L.Bridges
- Astragalus bicolor Lam.
- Astragalus bicristatus A.Gray
- Astragalus bidentatus Kunth
- Astragalus biebersteinii Bunge
- Astragalus bifoliolatus Širj. & Rech.f.
- Astragalus bijarensis Podlech & Sytin
- Astragalus bijugus Širj. & Rech.f.
- Astragalus bilobatoalatus (Rassulova) Podlech
- Astragalus biovulatus Bunge
- Astragalus birangiae Maassoumi
- Astragalus birdjandicus Parsa
- Astragalus bischkendicus Gontsch.
- Astragalus biserrula Bunge
- Astragalus bisulcatus (Hook.) A.Gray
- Astragalus blandulus Podlech & L.R.Xu
- Astragalus blattneri Bagheri & Maassoumi
- Astragalus bobrovii (Nevski) B.Fedtsch. ex Gontsch.
- Astragalus bodeanus Fisch.
- Astragalus bodinii E.Sheld.
- Astragalus boelckei Gómez-Sosa
- Astragalus boeticus L.
- Astragalus bogensis Rassulova
- Astragalus bojnurdensis Podlech
- Astragalus bolanderi A.Gray
- Astragalus bombycinus Boiss.
- Astragalus bonariensis Gómez-Sosa
- Astragalus bor-bulakensis Rassulova
- Astragalus bordschensis Bornm.
- Astragalus boreoafricanus Podlech & Zarre
- Astragalus borissianus Gontsch.
- Astragalus bornmuellerianus B.Fedtsch.
- Astragalus borodinii Krasn.
- Astragalus borraginaceus Rech.f.
- Astragalus bosbutooensis Nikif. & Sudn.
- Astragalus bossuensis Popov
- Astragalus botryophorus Maassoumi & Podlech
- Astragalus bouffordii Podlech
- Astragalus bounophilus Boiss. & Hohen.
- Astragalus bourgaeanus Coss.
- Astragalus bourgovii A.Gray
- Astragalus bowes-lyonii Podlech
- Astragalus bozakmanii Podlech
- Astragalus bozghoushensis Maassoumi, Mozaff. & Ramezani
- Astragalus brachybotrys Bunge
- Astragalus brachycalyx Fisch.
- Astragalus brachycarpus M.Bieb.
- Astragalus brachylobus DC.
- Astragalus brachyodontus Boiss.
- Astragalus brachypetalus Trautv.
- Astragalus brachypus Schrenk ex Fisch. & C.A.Mey.
- Astragalus brachyrhachis Popov
- Astragalus brachysemia Podlech & L.R.Xu
- Astragalus brachystachys DC.
- Astragalus brachytrichus Podlech & L.R.Xu
- Astragalus brachytropis (Steven) C.A.Mey.
- Astragalus brackenridgei A.Gray
- Astragalus bracteosus Boiss. & Noë
- Astragalus bradosticus Maassoumi & Podlech
- Astragalus brahuicus Bunge
- Astragalus brandegeei Porter & J.M.Coult.
- Astragalus brauntonii Parish
- Astragalus brazoensis Buckley
- Astragalus brevialatus H.T.Tsai & T.T.Yu
- Astragalus brevicalycinus Maassoumi
- Astragalus brevidens Freyn & Sint.
- Astragalus breviflorus DC.
- Astragalus brevifolius Ledeb.
- Astragalus brevifructus Podlech
- Astragalus brevipes Bunge
- Astragalus breviscapus B.Fedtsch.
- Astragalus brevitomentosus Podlech
- Astragalus brevivexillatus Podlech & L.R.Xu
- Astragalus breweri A.Gray
- Astragalus brotherusii Podlech
- Astragalus bruguieri Boiss.
- Astragalus brulloi Maassoumi
- Astragalus brunsianus Bornm.
- Astragalus bryogenes Barneby
- Astragalus bucharicus Regel
- Astragalus buchtormensis Pall.
- Astragalus bukanensis Maassoumi & Podlech
- Astragalus bungeanus Boiss.
- Astragalus burchan-buddaicus N.Ulziykh.
- Astragalus burkartii I.M.Johnst.
- Astragalus burqinensis Podlech & L.R.Xu
- Astragalus burtschumensis Saposhn. ex Sumnev.
- Astragalus buschiorum Galushko
- Astragalus bustillosii Clos
- Astragalus butkovii Popov

== C ==
- Astragalus cachinalensis Phil.
- Astragalus cadmicus Boiss.
- Astragalus caeruleopetalinus Y.C.Ho
- Astragalus caeruleus Bunge
- Astragalus caespititius Podlech
- Astragalus caespitosulus Gontsch.
- Astragalus cajamarcanus Gómez-Sosa
- Astragalus calamistratus Podlech
- Astragalus calcicola Podlech
- Astragalus californicus (A.Gray) Greene
- Astragalus callainus Podlech
- Astragalus callichrous Boiss.
- Astragalus calliphysa Bunge
- Astragalus callistachys Buhse
- Astragalus callithrix Barneby
- Astragalus calophyllus Boiss. & Heldr.
- Astragalus calvaryformis Parsa
- Astragalus calvertii Podlech & Ekici
- Astragalus calycinus M.Bieb.
- Astragalus calycosus Torr. ex S.Watson
- Astragalus camelorum Barbey
- Astragalus camptoceras Bunge
- Astragalus camptopus Barneby
- Astragalus campylanthoides Bornm.
- Astragalus campylanthus Boiss.
- Astragalus campylorrhynchus Fisch. & C.A.Mey.
- Astragalus campylotrichus Bunge
- Astragalus canadensis L.
- Astragalus cancellatus Bunge
- Astragalus candidissimus Ledeb.
- Astragalus canoflavus Popov
- Astragalus canosus Maassoumi
- Astragalus capax Maassoumi
- Astragalus capillipes Fisch. ex Bunge
- Astragalus capitis-regni Podlech & Zarre
- Astragalus capito Boiss. & Hohen.
- Astragalus caprinus L.
- Astragalus captiosus Boriss.
- Astragalus caraganae Fisch. & C.A.Mey.
- Astragalus carduchorum Boiss. & Hausskn.
- Astragalus caricinus (M.E.Jones) Barneby
- Astragalus cariensis Boiss.
- Astragalus carinatus (Hook. & Arn.) Reiche
- Astragalus carmanicus Bornm.
- Astragalus carminis Barneby
- Astragalus caroli-henrici I.Deml
- Astragalus carolynmugariae Arevsch.
- Astragalus cartilagineus Gontsch.
- Astragalus caryolobus Bunge
- Astragalus casapaltensis Ball
- Astragalus casei A.Gray
- Astragalus caspicus M.Bieb.
- Astragalus castaneiformis S.Watson
- Astragalus castetteri Barneby
- Astragalus catabostrychos I.Deml & Podlech
- Astragalus catacamptus Bunge
- Astragalus cataonicus Bunge
- Astragalus caucasicus Pall.
- Astragalus caudicosus Galkin & Nabiev
- Astragalus caudiculosus Boiss. & A.Huet
- Astragalus caulescens (Gontsch.) Abdusal.
- Astragalus cavanillesii Podlech
- Astragalus cedreti Boiss.
- Astragalus cedreticola A.Duran & Podlech
- Astragalus cellatus Maassoumi
- Astragalus cemerinus Beck
- Astragalus cenorrhynchus Barneby
- Astragalus centralis E.Sheld.
- Astragalus centroalpinus Braun-Blanq.
- Astragalus cephalanthus DC.
- Astragalus cephalotes Banks & Sol.
- Astragalus ceramicus E.Sheld.
- Astragalus cerasinus Baker
- Astragalus cerasocrenus Bunge
- Astragalus ceratoides M.Bieb.
- Astragalus cernuiflorus Gontsch.
- Astragalus cerussatus E.Sheld.
- Astragalus chadjanensis Franch.
- Astragalus chaetodon Bunge
- Astragalus chaetolobus Bunge
- Astragalus chaetopodus Bunge
- Astragalus chagyabensis P.C.Li & C.C.Ni
- Astragalus chahartaghensis Maassoumi & Podlech
- Astragalus chaidamuensis (S.B.Ho) Podlech & L.R.Xu
- Astragalus chalaranthus Boiss. & Hausskn.
- Astragalus chalilovii Grossh. ex Fed.
- Astragalus chamaeleuce A.Gray
- Astragalus chamaemeniscus Barneby
- Astragalus chamaephaca Freyn
- Astragalus chamaephyton Podlech & L.R.Xu
- Astragalus chamanbidensis Maassoumi & Mozaff.
- Astragalus chamardiensis Podlech
- Astragalus chamberlainianus Sümbül
- Astragalus chamissonis (Vogel) Reiche
- Astragalus chamonobrychis Podlech
- Astragalus changaicus Sanchir ex N.Ulziykh.
- Astragalus changduensis Y.C.Ho
- Astragalus changmuicus C.C.Ni & P.C.Li
- Astragalus charadzae Grossh.
- Astragalus chardinii Boiss.
- Astragalus charguschanus Freyn
- Astragalus chartostegius Boiss. & Hausskn.
- Astragalus chateri Vassilcz.
- Astragalus chehreganii Zarre & Podlech
- Astragalus chengkangensis Podlech & L.R.Xu
- Astragalus chichesticus Podlech & Maassoumi
- Astragalus chilienshanensis Y.C.Ho
- Astragalus chinensis L.f.
- Astragalus chingoanus Kamelin
- Astragalus chinzarticus Grossh.
- Astragalus chionobiiformis C.C.Towns.
- Astragalus chiukiangensis H.T.Tsai & T.T.Yu
- Astragalus chiwensis Bunge
- Astragalus chloodes Barneby
- Astragalus chlorodontus Bunge
- Astragalus chlorostachys Lindl.
- Astragalus chlorostegius Boiss. & Hausskn.
- Astragalus chodshamastonicus Pachom.
- Astragalus chodshenticus B.Fedtsch.
- Astragalus chomutovii B.Fedtsch.
- Astragalus chordorrhizus Fisch. ex Bunge
- Astragalus chorgosicus Lipsky
- Astragalus chorinensis Bunge
- Astragalus chorizanthus Rech.f. & Gilli
- Astragalus christianus L.
- Astragalus chrysanthus Boiss. & Hohen.
- Astragalus chrysochlorus Boiss. & Kotschy
- Astragalus chrysomallus Bunge
- Astragalus chrysopterus Bunge
- Astragalus chrysostachys Boiss.
- Astragalus chrysotrichus Boiss.
- Astragalus chtonocephalus Boiss. & Balansa
- Astragalus chubsugulicus Gontsch. ex N.Ulziykh.
- Astragalus chubutensis Speg.
- Astragalus chuskanus Barneby & Spellenb.
- Astragalus cibarius E.Sheld.
- Astragalus cicer L.
- Astragalus cicerellus Boiss. & Balansa
- Astragalus ciceroides Sosn.
- Astragalus ciceropsis Hamzehee & Maassoumi
- Astragalus cilicius Boiss.
- Astragalus ciloensis Podlech
- Astragalus cimae M.E.Jones
- Astragalus cinereus Willd.
- Astragalus circassicus Grossh.
- Astragalus circumdatus Greene
- Astragalus circumlacustris Podlech & Sytin
- Astragalus cisoxanus Podlech
- Astragalus citoinflatus Bondarenko
- Astragalus citrinus Bunge
- Astragalus claranus Jeps.
- Astragalus clarkeanus Ali
- Astragalus clausii C.A.Mey.
- Astragalus clavatus DC.
- Astragalus clerceanus Iljin & Krasch.
- Astragalus clevelandii Greene
- Astragalus cliffordii S.L.Welsh & N.D.Atwood
- Astragalus clivicola Podlech & Maassoumi
- Astragalus clusianus Soldano
- Astragalus coahuilae M.E.Jones
- Astragalus coarctatus Trautv.
- Astragalus cobrensis A.Gray
- Astragalus cobresiiphilus Podlech & L.R.Xu
- Astragalus coccineus (Parry) Brandegee
- Astragalus cochabambensis Gómez-Sosa
- Astragalus cognatus C.A.Mey.
- Astragalus colhuensis Gómez-Sosa
- Astragalus collenetteae Hedge & Podlech
- Astragalus collinus (Hook.) Douglas ex G.Don
- Astragalus coltonii M.E.Jones
- Astragalus columbianus Barneby
- Astragalus columnaris Boiss.
- Astragalus coluteocarpus Boiss.
- Astragalus coluteoides Willd.
- Astragalus coluteopsis Parsa
- Astragalus commagenicus (Hand.-Mazz.) Širj.
- Astragalus commixtus Bunge
- Astragalus comonduensis A.E.Estrada, Rebman & Villarreal
- Astragalus comosus Bunge
- Astragalus compactus Lam.
- Astragalus complicatus Gillies
- Astragalus compositus Pavlov
- Astragalus compressus Ledeb.
- Astragalus conaensis Podlech & L.R.Xu
- Astragalus concinnus Benth. ex Bunge
- Astragalus concordius S.L.Welsh
- Astragalus concretus Benth.
- Astragalus condensatus Ledeb.
- Astragalus confertiformis Širj. & Rech.f.
- Astragalus confertissimus Kitam.
- Astragalus confertus Benth. ex Bunge
- Astragalus confinis I.M.Johnst.
- Astragalus confusus Bunge
- Astragalus congdonii S.Watson
- Astragalus conjunctus S.Watson
- Astragalus connectens Podlech
- Astragalus consanguineus Bong. & C.A.Mey.
- Astragalus consimilis Bornm.
- Astragalus consobrinus (Barneby) S.L.Welsh
- Astragalus contortuplicatus L.
- Astragalus controversus Maassoumi & Podlech
- Astragalus convallarius Greene
- Astragalus coodei D.F.Chamb. & V.A.Matthews
- Astragalus coquimbensis (Hook. & Arn.) Reiche
- Astragalus coriaceus Hemsl.
- Astragalus corinthiacus Brullo, Giusso & Musarella
- Astragalus corniculatus M.Bieb.
- Astragalus cornu-bovis Lipsky
- Astragalus cornutus Pall.
- Astragalus coronilla Bunge
- Astragalus costatus Bunge
- Astragalus cottonianus Aitch. & Baker
- Astragalus cottonii M.E.Jones
- Astragalus cracca DC.
- Astragalus craccinopsis Maassoumi
- Astragalus craibianus N.D.Simpson
- Astragalus crassicarpus Nutt.
- Astragalus crassifolius Ulbr.
- Astragalus crassinervius Boiss. & Noë
- Astragalus crassispinus Bunge
- Astragalus cremnophylax Barneby
- Astragalus crenatus Schult.
- Astragalus cretaceus Boiss. & Kotschy
- Astragalus creticus Lam.
- Astragalus crinitus Boiss.
- Astragalus crispocarpus Nábělek
- Astragalus crispus Ghahrem.
- Astragalus croaticus Alegro, Bogdanović, Brullo & Giusso
- Astragalus cronquistii Barneby
- Astragalus crotalariae (Benth.) A.Gray
- Astragalus cruckshanksii (Hook. & Arn.) Griseb.
- Astragalus cruentiflorus Boiss.
- Astragalus crymophilus I.M.Johnst.
- Astragalus cryptanthus Wedd.
- Astragalus crypticus I.M.Johnst.
- Astragalus cryptobotrys I.M.Johnst.
- Astragalus cryptocarpos DC.
- Astragalus culminatus Maassoumi, Kaz.Osaloo & Joharchi
- Astragalus cuneifolius Bunge
- Astragalus cupulicalycinus S.B.Ho & Y.C.Ho
- Astragalus curtipes A.Gray
- Astragalus curvicarpus (E.Sheld.) J.F.Macbr.
- Astragalus curvicaulis (Clos) Reiche
- Astragalus curviflorus Boiss.
- Astragalus curvipes Trautv.
- Astragalus curvirostris Boiss.
- Astragalus cuscutae Bunge
- Astragalus cusickii A.Gray
- Astragalus cutleri (Barneby) S.L.Welsh
- Astragalus cuyanus Gómez-Sosa
- Astragalus cyaneus A.Gray
- Astragalus cyclophyllos Beck
- Astragalus cylleneus Fisch.
- Astragalus cymbaecarpos Brot.
- Astragalus cymbibracteatus Hub.-Mor. & D.F.Chamb.
- Astragalus cymboides M.E.Jones
- Astragalus cymbostegis Bunge
- Astragalus cyprius Boiss.
- Astragalus cyri Fomin ex Grossh.
- Astragalus cyrtobasis Bunge ex Boiss.
- Astragalus cyrusianus Parsa
- Astragalus cysticalyx Ledeb.
- Astragalus cystocarpus Boriss.
- Astragalus cystosus Zarre & Podlech
- Astragalus cytisoides Bunge
- Astragalus czilduchtaroni Kamelin
- Astragalus czorochensis Kharadze

== D ==
- Astragalus dabanshanicus Y.H.Wu
- Astragalus dactylocarpus Boiss.
- Astragalus daenensis Boiss.
- Astragalus daghdaghabadensis Maassoumi
- Astragalus daghestanicus Grossh.
- Astragalus dalaiensis Kitag.
- Astragalus daleae Greene
- Astragalus damardanicus Podlech
- Astragalus damghanensis Podlech
- Astragalus damzungensis Podlech & L.R.Xu
- Astragalus danicus Retz.
- Astragalus daqingshanicus Z.G.Jiang & Z.T.Yin
- Astragalus darendensis Podlech & Ekici
- Astragalus darrehbidensis Podlech & Zarre
- Astragalus darumbium (Bertero ex Colla) Gay
- Astragalus darwasicus Basil.
- Astragalus darwinianus Gómez-Sosa
- Astragalus daryouchianus Parsa
- Astragalus dasyanthus Pall.
- Astragalus dasycarpus D.F.Chamb.
- Astragalus datuensis Y.C.Ho
- Astragalus davidii Franch.
- Astragalus davisii D.F.Chamb. & V.A.Matthews
- Astragalus davuricus (Pall.) DC.
- Astragalus deanei (Rydb.) Barneby
- Astragalus debequaeus S.L.Welsh
- Astragalus decurrens Boiss.
- Astragalus degensis Ulbr.
- Astragalus degilmonus Rassulova
- Astragalus deickianus Bornm.
- Astragalus dejectus Maassoumi, F.Ghahrem. & Bagheri
- Astragalus dekazygus Širj. & Rech.f.
- Astragalus delicatulus Podlech
- Astragalus delutulus Maassoumi
- Astragalus demavendicola Bornm. & Gauba
- Astragalus demavendicus Boiss. & Buhse
- Astragalus demirizii R.Kramer & Podlech
- Astragalus demonstratus Maassoumi
- Astragalus dendroides Kar. & Kir.
- Astragalus dendroproselius Rech.f.
- Astragalus dengkouensis H.C.Fu
- Astragalus dengolanensis Podlech
- Astragalus densiflorus Kar. & Kir.
- Astragalus densifolius Lam.
- Astragalus densus Popov
- Astragalus denticulatus Podlech
- Astragalus denudatus Steven
- Astragalus depauperatus Ledeb.
- Astragalus dependens Bunge ex Maxim.
- Astragalus depressus L.
- Astragalus desereticus Barneby
- Astragalus despectus Podlech & L.R.Xu
- Astragalus desperatus M.E.Jones
- Astragalus deterior (Barneby) Barneby
- Astragalus detritalis M.E.Jones
- Astragalus devesae Talavera & A.González & G.López
- Astragalus devestitus Pazij & Vved.
- Astragalus dianat-nejadii Ghahrem.
- Astragalus dianthoides Boriss.
- Astragalus dianthus Bunge
- Astragalus diaphanus Douglas ex Hook.
- Astragalus dickorei Podlech & L.R.Xu
- Astragalus dictamnoides Gontsch.
- Astragalus dictyolobus C.A.Mey. ex Bunge
- Astragalus didymocarpus Hook. & Arn.
- Astragalus dieteri Kottaim. & Vasud.
- Astragalus dieterlei Podlech
- Astragalus dignus Boriss.
- Astragalus dillinghamii J.F.Macbr.
- Astragalus dilutuloides Maassoumi, F.Ghahrem. & Bagheri
- Astragalus dilutus Bunge
- Astragalus diminutivus (Phil.) Gómez-Sosa
- Astragalus dinawarii Bidarlord & F.Ghahrem.
- Astragalus dingjiensis C.C.Ni & P.C.Li
- Astragalus diopogon Bunge
- Astragalus dipelta Bunge
- Astragalus diphacus S.Watson
- Astragalus diphtherites Fenzl
- Astragalus dipodurus Bunge
- Astragalus dipsaceus Bunge
- Astragalus dirmilensis Hub.-Mor. & Reese
- Astragalus discernendus Širj. & Rech.f.
- Astragalus discessiflorus Gontsch.
- Astragalus discolor Bunge ex Maxim.
- Astragalus dissectus B.Fedtsch. & N.A.Ivanova
- Astragalus distans Fisch.
- Astragalus distentus Boriss.
- Astragalus distinctissimus Eig
- Astragalus distinens Macloskie
- Astragalus distortus Torr. & A.Gray
- Astragalus divandarrehensis Podlech
- Astragalus diversifolius A.Gray
- Astragalus diversus Podlech & Maassoumi
- Astragalus diyarbakirensis Podlech
- Astragalus djigensis Franch.
- Astragalus doabensis Podlech
- Astragalus dodtii Phil.
- Astragalus doghrunensis Maassoumi & Podlech
- Astragalus dolichocarpus Popov
- Astragalus dolichophyllus Pall.
- Astragalus dolichopodus Freyn
- Astragalus dolinicola (Brullo & Giusso) Brullo & Giusso
- Astragalus dolonus (Rassulova & B.A.Sharipova) Kamelin
- Astragalus dombeyi Fisch.
- Astragalus domeykoanus (Phil.) Reiche
- Astragalus dopolanicus Podlech
- Astragalus dorudensis Zarre & Podlech
- Astragalus doshman-ziariensis Maassoumi & Podlech
- Astragalus douglasii (Torr. & A.Gray) A.Gray
- Astragalus drabelliformis Barneby
- Astragalus drasianus H.J.Chowdhery, Uniyal & Balodi
- Astragalus drummondii Douglas ex Hook.
- Astragalus drupaceus Orph. ex Boiss.
- Astragalus drusorum Boiss.
- Astragalus dschuparensis Freyn & Bornm.
- Astragalus dshangartensis Sumnev.
- Astragalus dsharfi B.Fedtsch.
- Astragalus dsharkenticus Popov
- Astragalus dshimensis Gontsch.
- Astragalus duanensis Saposhn. ex Sumnev.
- Astragalus duchesnensis M.E.Jones
- Astragalus duheyuanensis Q.L.Gan & Z.W.Ke
- Astragalus dulungkiangensis P.C.Li
- Astragalus dumanii Ekící & Aytac
- Astragalus dumetorum Hand.-Mazz.
- Astragalus duplostrigosus Post & Beauverd
- Astragalus durandianus Aitch. & Baker
- Astragalus dutreuilii (Franch.) Grubov & N.Ulziykh.
- Astragalus dysbatophilus Zarre & Podlech
- Astragalus dzhebrailicus Grossh.

== E ==
- Astragalus eastwoodiae M.E.Jones
- Astragalus ebenoides Boiss.
- Astragalus ebrahimabadensis Zarre & Podlech
- Astragalus eburneus Bornm. & Gauba
- Astragalus ecbatanus Bunge
- Astragalus echanensis Podlech
- Astragalus echidna Bunge
- Astragalus echinatus Murray
- Astragalus echinops Aucher ex Boiss.
- Astragalus echinus DC.
- Astragalus edelbergianus Širj. & Rech.f.
- Astragalus edmondsonii Podlech
- Astragalus edmonstonei (Hook.f.) H.Rob.
- Astragalus edulis Durand ex Bunge
- Astragalus eerqisiensis Z.Y.Chang, L.R.Xu & Podlech
- Astragalus effusus Bunge
- Astragalus efoliatus Hand.-Mazz.
- Astragalus egglestonii (Rydb.) Kearney & Peebles
- Astragalus ehdenensis Mouterde
- Astragalus ehrenbergii Bunge
- Astragalus eigii Kirchhoff
- Astragalus ekbergii Podlech
- Astragalus ekicii H.Duman & Akan
- Astragalus ekimii Zarre & H.Duman
- Astragalus elatior Kitam.
- Astragalus elatus Boiss. & Balansa
- Astragalus elazigensis Ekim
- Astragalus elegans Bunge
- Astragalus elezgensis Maassoumi & Kaz.Osaloo
- Astragalus eliasianus Kit Tan & Sorger
- Astragalus ellipsoideus Ledeb.
- Astragalus elmaiticus Boiss. & Hausskn.
- Astragalus elongatus Willd.
- Astragalus elwendicus Bornm.
- Astragalus emarginatus Labill.
- Astragalus emoryanus (Rydb.) Cory
- Astragalus endopterus (Barneby) Barneby
- Astragalus endytanthus Podlech & I.Deml
- Astragalus ensifer Nábělek
- Astragalus ensiformis M.E.Jones
- Astragalus entomophyllus Boiss. & Hausskn.
- Astragalus episcopus S.Watson
- Astragalus eremiticus E.Sheld.
- Astragalus eremophilus Boiss.
- Astragalus eremospartoides Regel
- Astragalus ergenensis Kamelin & Sytin
- Astragalus erinifolius Pau
- Astragalus eriobasis Bornm.
- Astragalus eriocalyx Bunge
- Astragalus eriocarpus DC.
- Astragalus erioceras Fisch. & C.A.Mey. ex Ledeb.
- Astragalus erionotus Bunge
- Astragalus eriophylloides Rech.f.
- Astragalus eriopodus Boiss.
- Astragalus eriosphaerus Boiss. & Hausskn.
- Astragalus eriostomus Bornm.
- Astragalus erivanensis Bornm. & Woronow
- Astragalus ermineus V.A.Matthews
- Astragalus ernestii H.F.Comber
- Astragalus ertterae Barneby & Shevock
- Astragalus erubescens Podlech
- Astragalus ervoides Hook. & Arn.
- Astragalus erwinii-gaubae Širj. & Rech.f.
- Astragalus erythrolepis Boiss.
- Astragalus erythrosemius Boiss.
- Astragalus erythrotaenius Boiss.
- Astragalus esferayenicus Podlech & Maassoumi
- Astragalus esperanzae M.E.Jones
- Astragalus estahbanensis Maassoumi & Podlech
- Astragalus eubrychioides Boiss.
- Astragalus eucephalus Boiss.
- Astragalus euchlorus K.T.Fu
- Astragalus eucosmus B.L.Rob.
- Astragalus eupeplus Barneby
- Astragalus eurekensis M.E.Jones
- Astragalus eurylobus (Barneby) Barneby
- Astragalus eusarathron I.Deml & Podlech
- Astragalus eustrophacanthus Rech.f. & Edelb.
- Astragalus evanensis Maassoumi & Podlech
- Astragalus exasperatus Basil.
- Astragalus excedens Popov & Kult.
- Astragalus exiguus Post
- Astragalus exilis Korol.
- Astragalus eximius Bunge
- Astragalus expectatus Maassoumi
- Astragalus expetitus Maassoumi
- Astragalus exscapus L.
- Astragalus exsul Maire

== F ==
- Astragalus fabaceus M.Bieb.
- Astragalus fabrisii Gómez-Sosa
- Astragalus facetus Maassoumi & Podlech
- Astragalus fagh-soleimanensis Maassoumi & Podlech
- Astragalus falcatus Lam.
- Astragalus falciformis Desf.
- Astragalus falcigerus Popov
- Astragalus falconeri Bunge
- Astragalus fallacinus Podlech
- Astragalus famatinae I.M.Johnst.
- Astragalus fangensis N.D.Simpson
- Astragalus farakulumensis Širj. & Rech.f.
- Astragalus farctissimus Lipsky
- Astragalus farctus Bunge
- Astragalus farkharensis Podlech
- Astragalus farsicus Širj. & Rech.f.
- Astragalus fasciculifolius Boiss.
- Astragalus fastidius (Kellogg) M.E.Jones
- Astragalus faurei Maire
- Astragalus fausicola Podlech ex Bagheri, Maassoumi & F.Ghahrem.
- Astragalus fedtschenkoanus Lipsky
- Astragalus feensis M.E.Jones
- Astragalus ferganensis (Popov) B.Fedtsch. ex Korol.
- Astragalus ferruminatus Maassoumi
- Astragalus fetissowii B.Fedtsch.
- Astragalus fialae Degen
- Astragalus figueroai Kamffer & Ancona
- Astragalus filicaulis Fisch. & C.A.Mey. ex Ledeb.
- Astragalus filidens Podlech & L.R.Xu
- Astragalus filifoliolatus Maassoumi
- Astragalus filiformis (DC.) Poir.
- Astragalus filipes Torr. ex A.Gray
- Astragalus firuzkuhensis Podlech
- Astragalus fischeri Buhse
- Astragalus fissicalyx Sabaii, Zarre & Podlech
- Astragalus fissuralis Alex.
- Astragalus flabellatus Podlech
- Astragalus flavescens Boiss.
- Astragalus flavidus Popov
- Astragalus flavocreatus I.M.Johnst.
- Astragalus flavus Nutt.
- Astragalus flemingii Ali
- Astragalus flexicaulis Sosn.
- Astragalus flexilipes Bornm.
- Astragalus flexuosus (Hook.) Douglas ex G.Don
- Astragalus flexus Fisch.
- Astragalus floccosifolius Sumnev.
- Astragalus floccosus Boiss.
- Astragalus floridulus Podlech
- Astragalus foliosus Podlech, Maassoumi & Ranjbar
- Astragalus follicularis Pall.
- Astragalus forrestii N.D.Simpson
- Astragalus fortuitus Maassoumi
- Astragalus fragifer Bunge
- Astragalus fragiformis Willd.
- Astragalus fragrans Willd.
- Astragalus francisquitensis M.E.Jones
- Astragalus franziskae I.Deml
- Astragalus fraxinifolius DC.
- Astragalus freitagii I.Deml
- Astragalus fresenii Decne.
- Astragalus freynii Albov
- Astragalus frickii Bunge
- Astragalus fridae Rech.f.
- Astragalus friederikeanus Kit Tan & Zeitl.
- Astragalus frigidus (L.) A.Gray
- Astragalus froedinii Murb.
- Astragalus fruticosus Forssk.
- Astragalus fruticulosus Podlech
- Astragalus fucatus Barneby
- Astragalus fuhsii Freyn & Sint.
- Astragalus fukangensis Podlech & L.R.Xu
- Astragalus fuliginosus Beck
- Astragalus fumosus Boriss.
- Astragalus funereus M.E.Jones
- Astragalus fursei Podlech

== G ==
- Astragalus gabrelianae Arevsch.
- Astragalus gaeobotrys Boiss. & Balansa
- Astragalus gagnieui Maassoumi & Podlech
- Astragalus galactites Pall.
- Astragalus galegiformis L.
- Astragalus galiifolius Podlech
- Astragalus gamasiabensis Maassoumi, Zarre & Podlech
- Astragalus gambelianus E.Sheld.
- Astragalus gandeensis Y.H.Wu
- Astragalus gandomanicus Podlech
- Astragalus garbancillo Cav.
- Astragalus gardanikaphtharicus Rassulova
- Astragalus garmashubensis Maassoumi & Khorrami
- Astragalus gaubae Bornm.
- Astragalus gaudanensis B.Fedtsch.
- Astragalus gebleri Fisch. ex Bong. & C.A.Mey.
- Astragalus gemellus Podlech
- Astragalus geminiflorus Bonpl.
- Astragalus geminus Maassoumi
- Astragalus genargenteus Moris
- Astragalus geniculatus Desf.
- Astragalus gennarii Bacch. & Brullo
- Astragalus gentryi Standl.
- Astragalus genuflexus Freyn & Sint.
- Astragalus geocyamus Boiss.
- Astragalus georgii Gontsch.
- Astragalus germainii Phil.
- Astragalus germanicopolitanus Bornm.
- Astragalus gevashensis D.F.Chamb. & V.A.Matthews
- Astragalus geyeri A.Gray
- Astragalus geyikdaghensis Podlech & Ekici
- Astragalus ghahremanii Maassoumi & Podlech
- Astragalus ghamishluensis Dastpak, Maassoumi & Kaz.Osaloo
- Astragalus ghanbarianii Maassoumi, Podlech & Zarre
- Astragalus ghashghaicus Tietz & Zarre
- Astragalus ghoratensis Podlech
- Astragalus ghorbandicus Podlech
- Astragalus ghouchanensis Souzani, Zarre & Maassoumi
- Astragalus gibbsii Kellogg
- Astragalus gifanicus Maassoumi & Podlech
- Astragalus giganteus S.Watson
- Astragalus gigantifoliolatus Maassoumi & Maroofi
- Astragalus gigantirostratus Maassoumi, Ghahr. & Ghahrem.
- Astragalus gigantostegius Podlech
- Astragalus gilensis Greene
- Astragalus gilgitensis Ali
- Astragalus gillettii C.C.Towns.
- Astragalus gilmanii Tidestr.
- Astragalus gilvanensis Ranjbar & Nouri
- Astragalus gilviflorus E.Sheld.
- Astragalus gilvus Boiss.
- Astragalus gines-lopezii Talavera, Podlech, Devesa & F.M.Vázquez
- Astragalus glabellus Podlech
- Astragalus glabrescens Gontsch.
- Astragalus glabrifolius Bunge
- Astragalus glabritubus Podlech & L.R.Xu
- Astragalus gladiatus Boiss.
- Astragalus glaucacanthos Fisch.
- Astragalus glaucophylloides Bornm. & Woronow
- Astragalus glaucophyllus Bunge
- Astragalus glaucops Hausskn. ex Bornm.
- Astragalus glaux L.
- Astragalus globiceps Bunge
- Astragalus globiflorus Boiss.
- Astragalus globosus Vahl
- Astragalus glochideus Boriss.
- Astragalus glochidiatus Maassoumi
- Astragalus glomeratus Ledeb.
- Astragalus glumaceus Boiss.
- Astragalus glycyphylloides DC.
- Astragalus glycyphyllos L.
- Astragalus gobicus Hanelt & Davazamc
- Astragalus goeznensis Eig
- Astragalus goldmanii M.E.Jones
- Astragalus golmunensis Y.C.Ho
- Astragalus gombo Coss. & Durieu ex Bunge
- Astragalus gomboeformis Pomel
- Astragalus gompholobium Benth. ex Bunge
- Astragalus gonabadensis Nasseh, Joharchi & F.Ghahrem.
- Astragalus gongliuensis Podlech & L.R.Xu
- Astragalus gongshanensis Podlech & L.R.Xu
- Astragalus gontscharovii Vassilcz.
- Astragalus gooraiensis L.B.Chaudhary
- Astragalus gorczakovskii L.I.Vassiljeva
- Astragalus goreanus Aitch. & Baker
- Astragalus gorelovae A.V.Pavlenko & Laktionov
- Astragalus gorodkovii Jurtzev
- Astragalus gossypinus Fisch.
- Astragalus gracaninii Micevski
- Astragalus gracilidentatus S.B.Ho
- Astragalus gracilipes Benth. ex Bunge
- Astragalus gracilis Nutt.
- Astragalus graecus Boiss.
- Astragalus grahamianus Benth.
- Astragalus granatensis Lam.
- Astragalus granitovii Sanchir ex N.Ulziykh.
- Astragalus graveolens Benth.
- Astragalus grayi Parry ex S.Watson
- Astragalus gregarius I.Deml
- Astragalus greggii S.Watson
- Astragalus gregorii B.Fedtsch. & Basil.
- Astragalus greuteri Bacch. & Brullo
- Astragalus grey-wilsonianus Podlech
- Astragalus griersonii Podlech
- Astragalus griffithii Benth. ex Bunge
- Astragalus griseus Boiss.
- Astragalus groetzbachii Podlech
- Astragalus grubovii Sanchir
- Astragalus gruinus Barneby
- Astragalus grum-grshimailoi Palib.
- Astragalus gryphus Coss. & Durieu ex Bunge
- Astragalus guanajuatensis Rzed. & Calderón
- Astragalus guatemalensis Hemsl.
- Astragalus gubanovii N.Ulziykh.
- Astragalus gudrunensis Boiss. & Hausskn.
- Astragalus gueldenstaedtiae Bunge
- Astragalus gueruenensis Podlech
- Astragalus guinanicus Y.H.Wu
- Astragalus gulemiensis Sytin & I.N.Pospelov
- Astragalus gulul-saranii Podlech
- Astragalus gummifer Labill.
- Astragalus guttatus Banks & Sol.
- Astragalus guzelsuensis F.Ghahrem., Behçet & Demir
- Astragalus gymnalopecias Rech.f.
- Astragalus gymnolobus Fisch.
- Astragalus gymnopodus Boiss.
- Astragalus gypsaceus Beck
- Astragalus gypsocola Maassoumi & Podlech
- Astragalus gypsodes Barneby

== H ==
- Astragalus habaheensis Y.X.Liou
- Astragalus habamontis K.T.Fu
- Astragalus hadroacanthus Rech.f. & Gilli
- Astragalus haesitabundus Lipsky
- Astragalus hafez-shirazii Parsa
- Astragalus haiyuanensis Podlech & L.R.Xu
- Astragalus hajastanus Grossh.
- Astragalus hajiabadensis Podlech & Maassoumi
- Astragalus hajijafanensis Maassoumi
- Astragalus hakkariensis Podlech
- Astragalus hakkianus Bagheri, Maassoumi & Rahimin.
- Astragalus halawuensis Y.Z.Zhao & L.Q.Zhao
- Astragalus halicacabus Lam.
- Astragalus hallii A.Gray
- Astragalus hamadanus Boiss.
- Astragalus hamiensis S.B.Ho
- Astragalus hamiltonii Ced.Porter
- Astragalus hamosus L.
- Astragalus hamzae Hamzaoğlu
- Astragalus hamzaoglui Ketenoglu & Menemen
- Astragalus hancockii Bunge ex Maxim.
- Astragalus handelii H.T.Tsai & T.T.Yu
- Astragalus harazensis Zarre & Podlech
- Astragalus harbisonii Barneby
- Astragalus hareftae (Nábělek) Širj.
- Astragalus harirudensis Zarre & Podlech
- Astragalus harpocarpus Meffert
- Astragalus harrisonii Barneby
- Astragalus harshbergeri (Rydb.) A.E.Estrada, Villarreal & A.Delgado
- Astragalus harsukhianus Rech.f.
- Astragalus hartmanii Rydb.
- Astragalus hartvigii Kit Tan
- Astragalus hartwegii Benth.
- Astragalus hausknechtii Bunge
- Astragalus havianus E.Peter
- Astragalus hebecarpus S.S.Cheng ex S.B.Ho
- Astragalus hecatae Zarre & Podlech
- Astragalus hedgeanus Podlech
- Astragalus hedgei Kirchhoff
- Astragalus heideri Wettst.
- Astragalus heilii S.L.Welsh & N.D.Atwood
- Astragalus heinzianus Maassoumi & Mozaff.
- Astragalus hekmat-safaviae F.Ghahrem.
- Astragalus helbaekii Podlech & Ekici
- Astragalus heldreichii Boiss.
- Astragalus helleri Fenzl
- Astragalus helmii Fisch. ex DC.
- Astragalus hemiphaca Kar. & Kir.
- Astragalus hemsleyi Aitch. & Baker
- Astragalus henrimontanensis S.L.Welsh
- Astragalus henryi Oliv.
- Astragalus heptapotamicus Sumnev.
- Astragalus herbertii Maassoumi
- Astragalus hermannii Freitag & Podlech
- Astragalus hermoneus Boiss.
- Astragalus hesiensis N.Ulziykh.
- Astragalus heteracanthus Bornm.
- Astragalus heterochrous Bornm.
- Astragalus heterodontus Boriss.
- Astragalus heterodoxus Bunge
- Astragalus heterophyllus Podlech
- Astragalus heterotrichus Gontsch.
- Astragalus heterozyx Maassoumi
- Astragalus hezarensis Zarre & Podlech
- Astragalus hickenii Gómez-Sosa
- Astragalus hidalgensis (Rydb.) Barneby
- Astragalus himalayanus Klotzsch
- Astragalus hintonii Barneby
- Astragalus hirsutissimus DC.
- Astragalus hirsutus Vahl
- Astragalus hirticalyx Boiss. & Kotschy
- Astragalus hirtus Bunge
- Astragalus hispanicus Coss. ex Bunge
- Astragalus hispidulus DC.
- Astragalus hispidus Labill.
- Astragalus hissaricus Lipsky
- Astragalus hoantchy Franch.
- Astragalus hoffmeisteri (Klotzsch) Ali
- Astragalus hohenackeri Boiss.
- Astragalus holmgreniorum Barneby
- Astragalus hololeios Bornm.
- Astragalus holophyllus Boriss.
- Astragalus holopsilus Bunge
- Astragalus holosemius Bunge
- Astragalus homandicus Maassoumi & Podlech
- Astragalus hoodianus Howell
- Astragalus horasanicus Podlech
- Astragalus hornii A.Gray
- Astragalus horridus Boiss.
- Astragalus hoshanbaoensis Podlech & L.R.Xu
- Astragalus hostilis Boiss.
- Astragalus hotianensis S.B.Ho
- Astragalus hotkanensis Maassoumi & Mirtadz.
- Astragalus howellii A.Gray
- Astragalus hsinbaticus P.Y.Fu & Y.A.Chen
- Astragalus huber-morathii Kirchhoff
- Astragalus huiningensis Y.C.Ho
- Astragalus humifusus Willd.
- Astragalus humilis M.Bieb.
- Astragalus humillimus A.Gray
- Astragalus humistratus A.Gray
- Astragalus huochengensis Podlech & L.R.Xu
- Astragalus husseinovii Rzazade
- Astragalus huthianus Freyn & Bornm.
- Astragalus hyalinus M.E.Jones
- Astragalus hyalolepidoides A.P.Khokhr.
- Astragalus hymenocalyx Boiss.
- Astragalus hymenocystis Fisch. & C.A.Mey.
- Astragalus hymenostegis Fisch. & C.A.Mey.
- Astragalus hypogaeus Ledeb.
- Astragalus hypoglottis L.
- Astragalus hypoleucus S.Schauer
- Astragalus hypoxylus S.Watson
- Astragalus hypsogenus I.M.Johnst.
- Astragalus hypsogeton Bunge
- Astragalus hyrcanus Pall.
- Astragalus hysophilus Podlech & L.R.Xu
- Astragalus hystrix Fisch.

== I ==
- Astragalus ibicinus Boiss. & Hausskn.
- Astragalus ibrahimianus Maire
- Astragalus icmadophilus Hand.-Mazz.
- Astragalus ictericus Dingler
- Astragalus idaeus Bunge
- Astragalus idrietorum Barneby
- Astragalus igniarius Popov
- Astragalus ignotus Podlech
- Astragalus igoschinae Kamelin & Jurtzev
- Astragalus ihsancalisii Dönmez & Uğurlu
- Astragalus ikonnikovii Podlech
- Astragalus ilachchiensis Ranjbar & Zarin
- Astragalus iliensis Bunge
- Astragalus illinii I.M.Johnst.
- Astragalus imbecillus Maassoumi & Podlech
- Astragalus imetensis Boriss.
- Astragalus imitans Podlech
- Astragalus imitensis Ali
- Astragalus impexus Podlech
- Astragalus inaequalifolius Basil.
- Astragalus inaniae Göktürk, O.D.Düen & Sümbül
- Astragalus incanus L.
- Astragalus incertus Ledeb.
- Astragalus inchebroonensis Maassoumi
- Astragalus indistinctus Podlech & Maassoumi
- Astragalus indurescens Gontsch.
- Astragalus inexpectatus Maassoumi & Podlech
- Astragalus infestus Boiss.
- Astragalus inflaticarpus Ponert
- Astragalus inflatus DC.
- Astragalus inflexus Douglas ex Hook.
- Astragalus infractus Sumnev.
- Astragalus innominatus Boriss.
- Astragalus innotabilis Podlech
- Astragalus inquilinus Maassoumi
- Astragalus insignis Gontsch.
- Astragalus insularis Kellogg
- Astragalus intarrensis Franch.
- Astragalus intercedens Sam. ex Rech.f.
- Astragalus interiectus I.Deml
- Astragalus intermixtus (Boriss.) Litv. ex Širj.
- Astragalus inversus M.E.Jones
- Astragalus involutivus Sumnev.
- Astragalus inyoensis E.Sheld.
- Astragalus iodopetalus (Rydb.) Greene ex Barneby
- Astragalus iodotropis Boiss. & Hohen.
- Astragalus ionae Palib.
- Astragalus iranicus Bunge
- Astragalus iranshahrii Maassoumi & Podlech
- Astragalus irinae B.Fedtsch.
- Astragalus irisuensis Boriss.
- Astragalus isabellae Dunn
- Astragalus isauricus Hub.-Mor. & V.A.Matthews
- Astragalus ischredensis Bunge
- Astragalus iselyi S.L.Welsh
- Astragalus ishigensis Maxim. ex Hultén
- Astragalus ishkamishensis Podlech
- Astragalus iskanderi Lipsky
- Astragalus isphairamicus B.Fedtsch.
- Astragalus issatissensis Maassoumi & Mahmoodi
- Astragalus issykkulensis Sytin & Lazkov

== J ==
- Astragalus jabbor-khailii Kitam.
- Astragalus jacobsii Podlech
- Astragalus jaegerianus Munz
- Astragalus jagnobicus Lipsky
- Astragalus jaliscensis (Rydb.) Barneby
- Astragalus jamzadiae Maassoumi
- Astragalus japonicus H.Boissieu
- Astragalus jarmalii Podlech
- Astragalus jarmolenkoi Gontsch.
- Astragalus jaskensis Maassoumi
- Astragalus jaxarticus Pavlov
- Astragalus jejunus S.Watson
- Astragalus jelenevskyi Sytin
- Astragalus jesdianus Boiss. & Buhse
- Astragalus jessenii Bunge
- Astragalus jigenensis Y.H.Wu
- Astragalus jiuquanensis S.B.Ho
- Astragalus jodostachys Boiss. & Buhse
- Astragalus joergensenii I.M.Johnst.
- Astragalus johannis Boiss.
- Astragalus johannis-howellii Barneby
- Astragalus joharchii F.Ghahrem. & Gaskin
- Astragalus johnstonii Gómez-Sosa
- Astragalus jolderensis B.Fedtsch.
- Astragalus juladakensis Maassoumi
- Astragalus junatovii Sanchir
- Astragalus juniperetorum Gontsch.
- Astragalus junussovii Rassulova
- Astragalus juratzkanus Freyn & Sint.
- Astragalus juvenalis Delile

== K ==
- Astragalus kabadianus Lipsky
- Astragalus kabristanicus Grossh.
- Astragalus kabutarlanensis Dehshiri & Maassoumi
- Astragalus kadschorensis Bunge
- Astragalus kahiricus DC.
- Astragalus kalatehensis Maassoumi & Kaz.Osaloo
- Astragalus kaleibarensis Podlech
- Astragalus kamarinensis C.Brullo, Brullo, Giusso, Miniss. & Sciandr.
- Astragalus kamelinii Podlech
- Astragalus kapherrianus Fisch.
- Astragalus karabaghensis Bunge
- Astragalus karabilicus Popov
- Astragalus karakalensis Freyn & Sint.
- Astragalus karakorensis Pamp.
- Astragalus karakugensis Bunge
- Astragalus karamasicus Boiss. & Balansa
- Astragalus karataviensis Pavlov
- Astragalus karategini Gontsch.
- Astragalus karatjubeki Golosk.
- Astragalus karelinianus Popov
- Astragalus karjaginii Boriss.
- Astragalus karkarensis Popov
- Astragalus karl-heinzii Maassoumi
- Astragalus kasachstanicus Golosk.
- Astragalus kaschkadarjensis Gontsch.
- Astragalus kashafensis Podlech
- Astragalus kashmarensis Maassoumi & Podlech
- Astragalus kashmirensis Bunge
- Astragalus kastamonuensis D.F.Chamb. & V.A.Matthews
- Astragalus kaswinensis Bornm.
- Astragalus katunicus Pjak
- Astragalus kaufmannii Krylov
- Astragalus kavirensis Freitag
- Astragalus kawakamii Matsum.
- Astragalus kazbeki Kharadze
- Astragalus kazempourii Bagheri, Maassoumi & Mahmoodi
- Astragalus kazymbeticus Saposhn. ex Sumnev.
- Astragalus kelifi Lipsky
- Astragalus kelikanensis Podlech
- Astragalus kelishomensis Maassoumi, Mozaff. & Moradi
- Astragalus kelleri Popov
- Astragalus kelseyae B.L.Corbin
- Astragalus keminensis Isakov
- Astragalus kendyrlykii Popov
- Astragalus kenteicus N.Ulziykh.
- Astragalus kentrophyllus Podlech
- Astragalus kentrophyta A.Gray
- Astragalus keratensis Bunge
- Astragalus keredjensis Podlech
- Astragalus kerianus Trautv.
- Astragalus kerkukensis Bornm.
- Astragalus kermanschahensis Bornm.
- Astragalus kerrii P.J.Knight & Cully
- Astragalus kessleri Trautv.
- Astragalus khadem-kandicus Maassoumi & Podlech
- Astragalus khajehensis F.Ghahrem.
- Astragalus khajiboulaghensis Maassoumi
- Astragalus khalifatensis Ali
- Astragalus khaneradarensis Širj. & Rech.f.
- Astragalus kharvanensis Ranjbar
- Astragalus khasianus Benth. ex Bunge
- Astragalus khassanovii Podlech
- Astragalus khatamsaziae Maassoumi
- Astragalus khokhrjakovii Sytin & Podlech
- Astragalus khongensis Maassoumi, Joharchi & Podlech
- Astragalus khonikensis Nasseh & Joharchi
- Astragalus khoshjailensis Širj. & Rech.f.
- Astragalus khosrowabadensis Ranjbar & Karamian
- Astragalus khunsarensis Zarre & Podlech
- Astragalus khwaja-muhammadensis Podlech
- Astragalus kialensis N.D.Simpson
- Astragalus kiamaky-daghensis Maassoumi & Podlech
- Astragalus kifonsanicus Ulbr.
- Astragalus kirchhoffiae Podlech
- Astragalus kirghisorum Gontsch.
- Astragalus kirilovii Podlech
- Astragalus kirpicznikovii Grossh.
- Astragalus kirrindicus Boiss.
- Astragalus kirshehiricus D.F.Chamb.
- Astragalus kiviensis Ranjbar & Rahimin.
- Astragalus kjurendaghi V.A.Nikitin
- Astragalus klementzii N.Ulziykh.
- Astragalus knightii Barneby
- Astragalus knorringianus Boriss.
- Astragalus koburensis Bunge
- Astragalus kochakii Aytaç & H.Duman
- Astragalus koelzii Barneby
- Astragalus kohrudicus Bunge
- Astragalus koikitaensis Rassulova
- Astragalus kokandensis Bunge
- Astragalus kolymensis Jurtzev
- Astragalus komarovii Lipsky
- Astragalus kongrensis Benth. ex Baker
- Astragalus kongurensis Podlech
- Astragalus kopalensis Lipsky
- Astragalus kopetdaghi Boriss.
- Astragalus kordloricus Zarre
- Astragalus korolkowii Bunge
- Astragalus korotkovae Kamelin & Kovalevsk.
- Astragalus koschukensis Boiss.
- Astragalus koslovii B.Fedtsch. & Basil. ex N.Ulziykh.
- Astragalus kotschyanus Boiss.
- Astragalus koulehensis Podlech
- Astragalus kralikii Coss. ex Batt.
- Astragalus krascheninnikovii Kamelin
- Astragalus krasnovii Popov
- Astragalus krauseanus Regel
- Astragalus kronenburgii B.Fedtsch. ex Kneuck.
- Astragalus krylovii Schischk.
- Astragalus kubensis Grossh.
- Astragalus kudrjaschovii Korol.
- Astragalus kugartensis Boriss.
- Astragalus kuhidashtehensis Podlech
- Astragalus kukkonenii Podlech
- Astragalus kukunoricus N.Ulziykh.
- Astragalus kulabensis Lipsky
- Astragalus kuldshensis Bunge
- Astragalus kuldzhuktauense F.O.Khass., Shomur. & Esankulov
- Astragalus kunarensis Podlech
- Astragalus kunlunensis H.Ohba, S.Akiyama & S.K.Wu
- Astragalus kuramensis Baker
- Astragalus kurdicus Boiss.
- Astragalus kurgankolensis Ovcz. & Rassulova
- Astragalus kurnet-es-saudae Eig
- Astragalus kurtschumensis Bunge
- Astragalus kuschakewiczii B.Fedtsch.
- Astragalus kuschkensis Boriss.
- Astragalus kushmasarensis Vassilcz.
- Astragalus kusnetzovii Popov ex Kovalevsk.
- Astragalus kustanaicus Popov

== L ==
- Astragalus lacei (Ali) Kirchhoff
- Astragalus laceratus Lipsky
- Astragalus lachnolobus Kovalevsk. & Vved.
- Astragalus laconicus Iatroú & Kit Tan
- Astragalus lacteus Heldr. & Sartori
- Astragalus lacus-valashti Maassoumi, Podlech & Jalili
- Astragalus ladakhensis R.R.Rao & Balodi
- Astragalus laetabilis Podlech & L.R.Xu
- Astragalus laetus Bunge
- Astragalus lagobromus Knjaz. & Kulikov
- Astragalus lagopodioides Vahl
- Astragalus lagopoides Lam.
- Astragalus laguriformis Freyn
- Astragalus laguroides Pall.
- Astragalus lalandei Podlech
- Astragalus lalesarensis Bornm.
- Astragalus lamalaensis Z.C.Ni
- Astragalus lamarckii Boiss.
- Astragalus lambinonii Podlech
- Astragalus lamondiae I.Deml
- Astragalus lanatus Labill.
- Astragalus lancearius A.Gray
- Astragalus lanceolatus Bunge
- Astragalus langtangensis Podlech
- Astragalus lanzhouensis Podlech & L.R.Xu
- Astragalus laricus Boiss. & Hohen.
- Astragalus laristanicus Bornm. & Gauba
- Astragalus larvatus Sumnev.
- Astragalus lasiocalycinus Podlech & Maassoumi
- Astragalus lasiocalyx Gontsch.
- Astragalus lasioglottis Steven
- Astragalus lasiopetalus Bunge
- Astragalus lasiosemius Boiss.
- Astragalus lasiostylus Fisch.
- Astragalus laspurensis Ali
- Astragalus lateritiiformis Zarre, Maassoumi & Podlech
- Astragalus lateritius Boiss. & Hausskn.
- Astragalus latianicus Maassoumi & Ranjbar
- Astragalus latifolius Lam.
- Astragalus latistipulatus D.F.Chamb.
- Astragalus latiunguiculatus Y.C.Ho
- Astragalus latusioides Maassoumi & Zarre
- Astragalus lavrenkoi Kamelin
- Astragalus laxmannii Jacq.
- Astragalus layneae Greene
- Astragalus leansanicus Ulbr.
- Astragalus ledinghamii Barneby
- Astragalus legionensis Barneby
- Astragalus lehmannianus Bunge
- Astragalus leibergii M.E.Jones
- Astragalus leiophyllus Freyn & Bornm.
- Astragalus leiophysa Bunge
- Astragalus leiosemius (Lipsky) Popov
- Astragalus lemmonii A.Gray
- Astragalus lenensis Shemetova, Shaulo & Lomon.
- Astragalus lentiformis A.Gray
- Astragalus lentiginosus Douglas ex Hook.
- Astragalus lentilobus Kamelin & Kovalevsk.
- Astragalus leonardii Maassoumi
- Astragalus leontinus Wulfen
- Astragalus lepidus Podlech
- Astragalus leporinus Boiss.
- Astragalus lepsensis Bunge
- Astragalus leptaleus A.Gray
- Astragalus leptocarpus Torr. & A.Gray
- Astragalus leptocaulis Ledeb.
- Astragalus leptocladus Podlech & L.R.Xu
- Astragalus leptophysus Vved.
- Astragalus leptopus Popov
- Astragalus leptostachys Pall.
- Astragalus leptothalamus Boiss. ex Bunge
- Astragalus leptus Boiss.
- Astragalus leptynticus Maassoumi
- Astragalus lesbiacus Candargy
- Astragalus lessertioides Benth. ex Bunge
- Astragalus leucocalyx Popov
- Astragalus leucocephalus Benth.
- Astragalus leucocladus Bunge
- Astragalus leucolachnus Boiss.
- Astragalus leucolobus Parry ex M.E.Jones
- Astragalus leucomallophorus Bornm. & Širj.
- Astragalus leucophanus Bornm.
- Astragalus leucoptilus Boiss. & Hausskn.
- Astragalus leucothrix Freyn & Bornm.
- Astragalus levidensis Podlech & L.R.Xu
- Astragalus levieri Freyn ex Sommier & Levier
- Astragalus lhorongensis P.C.Li & C.C.Ni
- Astragalus licentianus Hand.-Mazz.
- Astragalus lignipes Akhavan & Maassoumi
- Astragalus lilacinus Boiss.
- Astragalus limariensis Muñoz
- Astragalus limnocharis Barneby
- Astragalus limprichtii Ulbr.
- Astragalus linczevskii Gontsch.
- Astragalus lindheimeri Engelm. ex A.Gray
- Astragalus lineatus Lam.
- Astragalus linifolius Osterh.
- Astragalus lipschitzii Pavlov
- Astragalus lipskyi Popov
- Astragalus listoniae Boiss.
- Astragalus lithophilus Kar. & Kir.
- Astragalus litwinowianus Gontsch.
- Astragalus litwinowii Lipsky
- Astragalus loanus Barneby
- Astragalus lobbichleri Podlech
- Astragalus lobophorus Boiss.
- Astragalus lonchocarpus Torr.
- Astragalus longicaulis Pomel
- Astragalus longicuspis Bunge
- Astragalus longidentatus Chater
- Astragalus longifolius Lam.
- Astragalus longilobus E.Peter
- Astragalus longipetalus Chater
- Astragalus longipetiolatus Popov
- Astragalus longiracemosus N.Ulziykh.
- Astragalus longirostratus Pau
- Astragalus longiscapus C.C.Ni & P.C.Li
- Astragalus longisepalus Rassulova
- Astragalus longissimus (M.E.Jones) Barneby
- Astragalus longistipitatus Boriss.
- Astragalus longistylus Bunge
- Astragalus longisubulatus Podlech
- Astragalus longivexillatus Podlech & Ekici
- Astragalus looseri I.M.Johnst.
- Astragalus lorinserianus Freyn
- Astragalus lotiflorus Hook.
- Astragalus lucidus H.T.Tsai & T.T.Yu
- Astragalus luculentus Podlech & L.R.Xu
- Astragalus lumsdenianus Aitch. & Baker
- Astragalus lunatus Pall.
- Astragalus lupulinus Pall.
- Astragalus lurorum Bornm.
- Astragalus lustricola Podlech & L.R.Xu
- Astragalus luteiflorus N.Ulziykh.
- Astragalus luteolus H.T.Tsai & T.T.Yu
- Astragalus lutosus M.E.Jones
- Astragalus luxurians Bunge
- Astragalus lyallii A.Gray
- Astragalus lycaonicus Hub.-Mor. & Reese
- Astragalus lychnobius Podlech & L.R.Xu
- Astragalus lycioides Boiss.
- Astragalus lycius Boiss.
- Astragalus lyonnetii Barneby

== M ==
- Astragalus maabudii Ranjbar
- Astragalus maarofii Podlech & Maassoumi
- Astragalus maassoumii Podlech
- Astragalus mackeviczii Gontsch.
- Astragalus macriculus Podlech & L.R.Xu
- Astragalus macrobotrys Bunge
- Astragalus macrocarpus DC.
- Astragalus macrocephalus Willd.
- Astragalus macrocladus Bunge
- Astragalus macrodon (Hook. & Arn.) A.Gray
- Astragalus macrolobus M.Bieb.
- Astragalus macronyx Bunge
- Astragalus macropelmatus Bunge
- Astragalus macropetalus Schrenk
- Astragalus macropodium Lipsky
- Astragalus macropus Bunge
- Astragalus macrosemius Boiss. & Hohen.
- Astragalus macrostachys DC.
- Astragalus macrostephanus (S.B.Ho) Podlech & L.R.Xu
- Astragalus macrotropis Bunge
- Astragalus macrouroides Hub.-Mor.
- Astragalus macrourus Fisch. & C.A.Mey.
- Astragalus magdalenae Greene
- Astragalus magellanicus Gómez-Sosa
- Astragalus magistratus Maassoumi, Ghahr. & Mozaff.
- Astragalus magnibracteatus Maassoumi & Maroofi
- Astragalus magnibracteus Y.H.Wu
- Astragalus magnificus Kolak.
- Astragalus magnifolius Parsa
- Astragalus mahmutlarensis Podlech
- Astragalus mahneshanensis Maassoumi & Moussavi
- Astragalus mahoschanicus Hand.-Mazz.
- Astragalus mailiensis B.Fedtsch.
- Astragalus maireanus Greuter & Burdet
- Astragalus maiusculus Podlech & L.R.Xu
- Astragalus majevskianus Krylov
- Astragalus majixueshanicus Y.H.Wu
- Astragalus makuensis Maassoumi, Bagheri & Rahimin.
- Astragalus malacoides Barneby
- Astragalus malacus A.Gray
- Astragalus malatyaensis Podlech
- Astragalus malaviensis Maassoumi & Mehrnia
- Astragalus malcolmii Hemsl. & H.Pearson
- Astragalus managettae Širj. & Rech.f.
- Astragalus managildensis B.Fedtsch.
- Astragalus maniaticus Kit Tan & Strid
- Astragalus maowensis Podlech & L.R.Xu
- Astragalus maquensis Y.H.Wu
- Astragalus marandicus Podlech
- Astragalus mardinensis Nábělek
- Astragalus mareoticus Delile
- Astragalus margonensis Ranjbar, Rahimin. & Raufi
- Astragalus margusaricus Lipsky
- Astragalus marinus Boriss.
- Astragalus mario-sousae A.E.Estrada, Villarreal & C.Yen
- Astragalus maritimus Moris
- Astragalus marivanensis Podlech & Maassoumi
- Astragalus markasicus Podlech & Maassoumi
- Astragalus maroccanus Braun-Blanq. & Maire
- Astragalus martinii Spellenb., Van Devender & P.D.Jenkins
- Astragalus marzanabadensis Maassoumi
- Astragalus masenderanus Bunge
- Astragalus massagetowii B.Fedtsch.
- Astragalus massalskyi Grossh.
- Astragalus matiensis P.C.Li
- Astragalus mattam H.T.Tsai & T.T.Yu
- Astragalus matthewsiae Podlech & Kirchhoff
- Astragalus maurorum Murb.
- Astragalus maurus (Humbert & Maire) Pau
- Astragalus maximowiczii Trautv.
- Astragalus maxwellii Benth.
- Astragalus medius Schrenk
- Astragalus megacarpus (Nutt.) A.Gray
- Astragalus megalanthus DC.
- Astragalus megalocystis Bunge
- Astragalus megalomerus Bunge
- Astragalus megalotropis C.A.Mey. ex Bunge
- Astragalus megricus Grossh.
- Astragalus mehranensis Maassoumi & Mozaff.
- Astragalus mehrizianus Podlech & Maassoumi
- Astragalus meimandicus Maassoumi & Vakili
- Astragalus mekongensis Podlech
- Astragalus melanocalyx Boiss.
- Astragalus melanocephalus Boiss.
- Astragalus melanochiton I.Deml
- Astragalus melanocladus Lipsky
- Astragalus melanocomus Popov
- Astragalus melanodon Boiss.
- Astragalus melanophrurius Boiss.
- Astragalus melanostachys Benth. ex Bunge
- Astragalus melanostictus Freyn
- Astragalus melilotoides Pall.
- Astragalus melitenensis Boiss.
- Astragalus membranostipulus Maassoumi
- Astragalus memnonius Maassoumi & Podlech
- Astragalus memoriosus Pakravan, Nasseh & Maassoumi
- Astragalus mendocinus Gómez-Sosa
- Astragalus mercklinii Boiss. & Buhse
- Astragalus merkensis Kamelin & Kovalevsk.
- Astragalus merxmuelleri Podlech
- Astragalus meshkinensis Podlech
- Astragalus meskheticus Manden.
- Astragalus mesogitanus Boiss.
- Astragalus mesoleios Boiss. & Hohen.
- Astragalus mesopterus Griseb.
- Astragalus meyeri Boiss.
- Astragalus michauxianus Boiss.
- Astragalus michauxii (Kuntze) F.J.Herm.
- Astragalus micrancistrus Boiss. & Hausskn.
- Astragalus micranthellus Wedd.
- Astragalus micranthus Desf.
- Astragalus microcalycinus Širj. & Rech.f.
- Astragalus microcephalus Willd.
- Astragalus microcymbus Barneby
- Astragalus microcystis A.Gray
- Astragalus microfoliolatus Nasseh
- Astragalus micromerius Barneby
- Astragalus microphysa Boiss.
- Astragalus microphysopsis (Tietz) Podlech
- Astragalus micropterus Fisch.
- Astragalus microrchis Barneby
- Astragalus mieheorum Podlech & L.R.Xu
- Astragalus migpo Kamelin
- Astragalus miguelensis Greene
- Astragalus mikrophytoides Podlech
- Astragalus mikrophyton Širj. & Rech.f.
- Astragalus minhensis X.Y.Zhu & C.J.Chen
- Astragalus miniatus Bunge
- Astragalus minimus Vogel
- Astragalus minshanensis K.T.Fu
- Astragalus minthorniae (Rydb.) Jeps.
- Astragalus minudentatus Y.C.Ho
- Astragalus minutissimus Wedd.
- Astragalus minutulus Maassoumi
- Astragalus mirabilis Lipsky
- Astragalus miralamensis Podlech
- Astragalus mironovii Pachom. & Rassulova
- Astragalus mirus Sosn.
- Astragalus misellus S.Watson
- Astragalus miser Douglas ex Hook.
- Astragalus miseriflorus Širj. & Rech.f.
- Astragalus mishodaghmontanus Ranjbar, Karamian & Nouri
- Astragalus missouriensis Nutt.
- Astragalus miyalomontis P.C.Li
- Astragalus moabiticus Post
- Astragalus modestus Boiss. & Hohen.
- Astragalus moellendorffii Bunge ex Maxim.
- Astragalus moencoppensis M.E.Jones
- Astragalus mogoltavicus Popov
- Astragalus mohavensis S.Watson
- Astragalus mokeevae Popov
- Astragalus mokiacensis A.Gray
- Astragalus molestus Rech.f.
- Astragalus mollis M.Bieb.
- Astragalus mollissimus Torr.
- Astragalus molybdenus Barneby
- Astragalus monadelphus Bunge ex Maxim.
- Astragalus monanthemus Boiss.
- Astragalus monbeigii N.D.Simpson
- Astragalus mongholicus Bunge
- Astragalus monoensis Barneby
- Astragalus monophyllus Bunge ex Maxim.
- Astragalus monozyx Bornm.
- Astragalus monspessulanus L.
- Astragalus monteroi I.M.Johnst.
- Astragalus monticola Phil.
- Agrilus montii S.L.Welsh
- Astragalus montis-alamkuhi Maassoumi
- Astragalus montis-aquillae Grossh.
- Astragalus montis-bakhtiari Maassoumi & Sardari
- Astragalus montis-nacarouzii Maassoumi & Maroofi
- Astragalus montis-parrowii Maassoumi & Nemati
- Astragalus montis-queydari F.Ghahrem., Maassoumi & Bagheri
- Astragalus montis-varvashti Podlech
- Astragalus montismishoudaghi Sheikh Akbari Mehr, Ghorbani & Maassoumi
- Astragalus montivagus Podlech & L.R.Xu
- Astragalus monumentalis Barneby
- Astragalus moranii Barneby
- Astragalus mostafa-assadii Bagheri, Maassoumi, F.Ghahrem. & Podlech
- Astragalus moupinensis Franch.
- Astragalus moussavii Maassoumi, Ghahr.-Nejad & Ghahr.
- Astragalus movlavius Parsa
- Astragalus moyanoi Speg.
- Astragalus mozaffarianii Maassoumi
- Astragalus mucidus Bunge ex Boiss.
- Astragalus mucronifolius Boiss.
- Astragalus muelleri Steud. & Hochst.
- Astragalus mugliensis Podlech & Ekici
- Astragalus mugosaricus Bunge
- Astragalus mulfordiae M.E.Jones
- Astragalus muliensis Hand.-Mazz.
- Astragalus multiceps Benth.
- Astragalus multiflorus (Pursh) A.Gray
- Astragalus multijugus DC.
- Astragalus mundulus Podlech
- Astragalus munroi Benth. ex Bunge
- Astragalus munzurensis Yıld.
- Astragalus murinus Boiss.
- Astragalus musaianus Maassoumi & Joharchi
- Astragalus muschianus Kotschy & Boiss.
- Astragalus muschketowii B.Fedtsch.
- Astragalus musiniensis M.E.Jones
- Astragalus mutus Podlech
- Astragalus myriacanthus Boiss.

== N ==
- Astragalus nabelekii Czeczott
- Astragalus naftabensis Širj. & Rech.f.
- Astragalus nagaii Nakai
- Astragalus naghadehensis (Tietz & Zarre) Naderi Safar & Maassoumi
- Astragalus nahavandicus Maassoumi
- Astragalus nainitalensis L.B.Chaudhary
- Astragalus nakaianus Y.N.Lee
- Astragalus nakaoi Kitam.
- Astragalus nalbandanicus Podlech
- Astragalus namanganicus Popov
- Astragalus nanellus H.T.Tsai & T.T.Yu
- Astragalus nanfengensis Z.C.Ni
- Astragalus nangxianensis P.C.Li & C.C.Ni
- Astragalus nanjiangianus K.T.Fu
- Astragalus nankotaizanensis Sasaki
- Astragalus nanshanicus Podlech & L.R.Xu
- Astragalus narmanicus Karaman & Aytaç
- Astragalus naturitensis Payson
- Astragalus nebrodensis (Guss.) Strobl
- Astragalus nedjefabadensis Parsa
- Astragalus neglectus (Torr. & A.Gray) E.Sheld.
- Astragalus nelidae Gómez-Sosa
- Astragalus nelsonianus Barneby
- Astragalus nematodes Bunge ex Boiss.
- Astragalus nemorosus Batt.
- Astragalus nenilinii Khass. & Malzev
- Astragalus neoassadabadensis F.Ghahrem. & Maassoumi
- Astragalus neoassadianus Ranjbar
- Astragalus neobarnebyanus Gómez-Sosa
- Astragalus neobotschantzevii Turak., F.O.Khass. & Gaffarov
- Astragalus neoburkartianus Gómez-Sosa
- Astragalus neocarpus Gómez-Sosa
- Astragalus neochaldoranicus Podlech & Maassoumi
- Astragalus neochorgosicus Podlech
- Astragalus neoiranshahrii Maassoumi & Amini Rad
- Astragalus neokarelinianus Knjaz.
- Astragalus neolipskyanus Popov
- Astragalus neomaassoumianus Ranjbar
- Astragalus neomexicanus Wooton & Standl.
- Astragalus neomobayenii Maassoumi
- Astragalus neomonodelphus H.T.Tsai & T.T.Yu
- Astragalus neomozaffarianii Maassoumi
- Astragalus neopodlechii Maassoumi
- Astragalus neopopovii Golosk.
- Astragalus neosytinii Ranjbar
- Astragalus nepalensis Podlech
- Astragalus nephtonensis Freyn
- Astragalus neplii Podlech
- Astragalus nervifolius Maassoumi, Podlech & Zarre
- Astragalus nervistipulus Boiss. & Hausskn.
- Astragalus nervulosus Eig & Reese ex Hub.-Mor.
- Astragalus neubauerianus Širj. & Rech.f.
- Astragalus neuquenensis Gómez-Sosa
- Astragalus neurocarpus Boiss.
- Astragalus neurophyllus Franch.
- Astragalus nevadensis Boiss.
- Astragalus nevinii A.Gray ex Lyon
- Astragalus nevskii Gontsch.
- Astragalus newberryi A.Gray
- Astragalus neyshaburensis Podlech
- Astragalus nezaketiae A.Duran & Aytaç
- Astragalus nezva-montis Podlech & Zarre
- Astragalus nicharensis Bunge
- Astragalus nicolaii Boriss.
- Astragalus nicorae Gómez-Sosa
- Astragalus nidularius Barneby
- Astragalus nigdeanus Podlech & Ekici
- Astragalus nigricans Barneby
- Astragalus nigriceps Popov
- Astragalus nigrifructus Podlech & Aytaç
- Astragalus nigritus Širj. & Rech.f.
- Astragalus nigrivestitus Podlech & I.Deml
- Astragalus nigrocalycinus Podlech
- Astragalus nigrocalyx Slobodov ex Grig.
- Astragalus nigrocarpus Khass. & Malzev
- Astragalus nigrodentatus N.Ulziykh. ex Podlech & L.R.Xu
- Astragalus nigrolineatus Širj. & Rech.f.
- Astragalus nigropedunculatus Podlech & Ekici
- Astragalus nikitinae B.Fedtsch.
- Astragalus ninae Pavlov
- Astragalus nitidiflorus Jiménez & Pau
- Astragalus nitidissimus Greuter & Burdet
- Astragalus nivalis Kar. & Kir.
- Astragalus nivicola Gómez-Sosa
- Astragalus nobilis Bunge & B.Fedtsch.
- Astragalus noeanus Boiss.
- Astragalus nokoensis Sasaki
- Astragalus norvegicus Weber
- Astragalus notabilis Podlech
- Astragalus nothoxys A.Gray
- Astragalus novissimus Podlech & L.R.Xu
- Astragalus nowroozii Podlech & Zarre
- Astragalus nubicola Podlech
- Astragalus nucifer Bunge
- Astragalus nucleosus Popov
- Astragalus nudisiliquus A.Nelson
- Astragalus nudus Clos
- Astragalus nummularius Lam.
- Astragalus nuoergongensis L.Q.Zhao & Xu Ri
- Astragalus nurabadensis Maassoumi & Podlech
- Astragalus nuratensis Popov
- Astragalus nurensis Boiss. & Buhse
- Astragalus nurhakdagensis Uzun, Aytaç & Tülücü
- Astragalus nutans M.E.Jones
- Astragalus nutriosensis S.C.Sand.
- Astragalus nuttallianus DC.
- Astragalus nuttallii (Torr. & A.Gray) J.T.Howell
- Astragalus nutzotinensis J.Rousseau
- Astragalus nydeggeri Zarre & H.Duman
- Astragalus nyensis Barneby

== O ==
- Astragalus obcordatus Elliott
- Astragalus obscurus S.Watson
- Astragalus obtusifoliolus (S.B.Ho) Podlech & L.R.Xu
- Astragalus obtusifolius DC.
- Astragalus occultus Podlech & L.R.Xu
- Astragalus ochotensis A.P.Khokhr.
- Astragalus ochranthus Gontsch.
- Astragalus ochreatus Bunge
- Astragalus ochrias Bunge ex Maxim.
- Astragalus ochrochlorus Boiss. & Hohen.
- Astragalus octopus C.C.Towns.
- Astragalus odoratus Lam.
- Astragalus ohbaensis Podlech
- Astragalus oihorensis Ali
- Astragalus oksutdagensis H.Duman & Karaman
- Astragalus olangensis Maassoumi & Joharchi
- Astragalus olchonensis Gontsch.
- Astragalus oldenburgii B.Fedtsch.
- Astragalus oleifolius DC.
- Astragalus olgae Bunge
- Astragalus oligoflorus Maassoumi, Ghahrem. & Javadi
- Astragalus oligophyllus Boiss.
- Astragalus oltensis Grossh.
- Astragalus olurensis Podlech
- Astragalus omissus Pachom.
- Astragalus oncotrichus Bunge
- Astragalus oniciformis Barneby
- Astragalus onobrychioides M.Bieb.
- Astragalus onobrychis L.
- Astragalus oocalycis M.E.Jones
- Astragalus oocarpus A.Gray
- Astragalus oocephalus Boiss.
- Astragalus oophorus S.Watson
- Astragalus ophiocarpus Benth. ex Bunge
- Astragalus oplites Benth. ex R.Parker
- Astragalus orbicularifolius P.C.Li & C.C.Ni
- Astragalus orbiculatus Ledeb.
- Astragalus orcuttianus S.Watson
- Astragalus ordubadensis Grossh.
- Astragalus oreades C.A.Mey.
- Astragalus oreganus Nutt.
- Astragalus oreites Beck
- Astragalus oreocharis Podlech & L.R.Xu
- Astragalus orientopersicus F.Ghahrem., Joharchi, Fereid. & Hoseini
- Astragalus ornithopodioides Lam.
- Astragalus ornithorrhynchus Popov
- Astragalus oropolitanus Knjaz. & Kulikov
- Astragalus orthocarpoides Širj. & Rech.f.
- Astragalus orthocarpus Boiss.
- Astragalus ortholobiformis Sumnev.
- Astragalus ortholobus Bunge
- Astragalus orthorhynchus Bornm.
- Astragalus osterhoutii M.E.Jones
- Astragalus otiporensis Boiss.
- Astragalus ovabaghensis Akan & Aytaç
- Astragalus ovalis Boiss. & Balansa
- Astragalus ovatus DC.
- Astragalus ovczinnikovii Boriss.
- Astragalus ovigerus Boiss.
- Astragalus ovinus Boiss.
- Astragalus ovoideus Širj. & Rech.f.
- Astragalus owirensis Ali ex Podlech
- Astragalus oxyglottis Steven ex M.Bieb.
- Astragalus oxyglottoides Bornm. & Gauba
- Astragalus oxyodon Baker
- Astragalus oxyphysopsis Barneby
- Astragalus oxyphysus A.Gray
- Astragalus oxypterus Boriss.
- Astragalus oxyrhynchus Hemsl.
- Astragalus oxytropifolius Boiss.

== P ==
- Astragalus pachypus Greene
- Astragalus pachyrhachis Širj. & Rech.f.
- Astragalus pachyrrhizus Popov
- Astragalus pachystachys Bunge
- Astragalus packardiae (Barneby) J.F.Sm. & Zimmers
- Astragalus pakistanicus Podlech
- Astragalus pakravaniae Podlech & Maassoumi
- Astragalus paktiensis Podlech
- Astragalus palaestinus Eig
- Astragalus palenae (Phil.) Reiche
- Astragalus palibinii Polozhij
- Astragalus pallasii Biehler
- Astragalus pallescens M.Bieb.
- Astragalus palmeri A.Gray
- Astragalus pamirensis Franch.
- Astragalus panamintensis E.Sheld. ex Coult.
- Astragalus panduratus Bunge
- Astragalus papillosus Podlech
- Astragalus paposanus I.M.Johnst.
- Astragalus paradoxus Bunge
- Astragalus paraglycyphyllos H.Boissieu
- Astragalus paragriseus Ponert
- Astragalus paralipomenus Bunge
- Astragalus paralurges Bunge
- Astragalus paralurgiformis F.Ghahrem., Maassoumi & Bagheri
- Astragalus pardalinus (Rydb.) Barneby
- Astragalus parkeri I.Deml
- Astragalus parnassi Boiss.
- Astragalus parodii I.M.Johnst.
- Astragalus paroensis Podlech
- Astragalus parryi A.Gray
- Astragalus parvarensis Podlech & Sytin
- Astragalus parvicarinatus S.B.Ho
- Astragalus parvulus Bornm.
- Astragalus parvus Hemsl.
- Astragalus parwanicus Podlech & I.Deml
- Astragalus pascuicola Podlech
- Astragalus pasqualensis M.E.Jones
- Astragalus patagonicus (Phil.) Speg.
- Astragalus patentipilosus Kitam.
- Astragalus patentivillosus Gontsch.
- Astragalus patnosicus D.F.Chamb. & V.A.Matthews
- Astragalus patrius Maassoumi
- Astragalus pattersonii A.Gray
- Astragalus patulepilosus Širj. & Rech.f.
- Astragalus paucifoliolatus Podlech
- Astragalus paucijugus Schrenk
- Astragalus pauper Bunge
- Astragalus pauperculus Greene
- Astragalus pauperiflorus Bornm.
- Astragalus pauperiformis B.Fedtsch.
- Astragalus pauranthus I.M.Johnst.
- Astragalus pauxillis Maassoumi & Ghahrem.
- Astragalus pavlovianus Gamajun.
- Astragalus pavlovii B.Fedtsch. & Basil.
- Astragalus paysonii (Rydb.) Barneby
- Astragalus peckii Piper
- Astragalus pecten-erinis I.Deml
- Astragalus pecten-hystricis I.Deml
- Astragalus pectinatus (Hook.) Douglas ex G.Don
- Astragalus pediculariformis Maassoumi
- Astragalus peduncularis Benth.
- Astragalus pedunculosus Popov
- Astragalus pehuenches Niederl.
- Astragalus pelliger Fenzl
- Astragalus pellitus Bunge
- Astragalus peltatus Podlech & I.Deml
- Astragalus peltopsis Podlech & Rech.f.
- Astragalus pendulatopetalus S.B.Ho & Z.H.Wu
- Astragalus penduliflorus Lam.
- Astragalus pendulinus Popov & B.Fedtsch.
- Astragalus pendulipodus Ranjbar & Karamian
- Astragalus pendulus DC.
- Astragalus penetratus Maassoumi
- Astragalus penicillatus Podlech
- Astragalus pennatus Bunge
- Astragalus pennellianus Barneby
- Astragalus pentanthus Boiss.
- Astragalus perbrevis Podlech & L.R.Xu
- Astragalus perdurans Podlech
- Astragalus peregrinus Vahl
- Astragalus pereshkhoranicus Maassoumi & Ghahrem.
- Astragalus perianus Barneby
- Astragalus permiensis C.A.Mey. ex Rupr.
- Astragalus perplexans Podlech
- Astragalus persicus (DC.) Fisch. & C.A.Mey.
- Astragalus persimilis Podlech & L.R.Xu
- Astragalus peruvianus Vogel
- Astragalus peterae H.T.Tsai & T.T.Yu
- Astragalus peterfii Jáv.
- Astragalus petkoffii B.Fedtsch.
- Astragalus petraeus Kar. & Kir.
- Astragalus petropolitanus E.Sheld.
- Astragalus petropylensis Bunge
- Astragalus petrovii N.Ulziykh.
- Astragalus petunnikowii Litv.
- Astragalus peymanii Maassoumi
- Astragalus phalacropyton I.Deml
- Astragalus phlomoides Boiss.
- Astragalus phoenix Barneby
- Astragalus phrygius Širj.
- Astragalus physocalyx Fisch.
- Astragalus physocarpus Ledeb.
- Astragalus physodes L.
- Astragalus pickeringii A.Gray
- Astragalus pictiformis Barneby
- Astragalus pileh-khasehensis Podlech & Maassoumi
- Astragalus pilosior Spellenb. & E.W.Anderson
- Astragalus pilutschensis Gontsch. ex N.Ulziykh.
- Astragalus pindreensis (Benth. ex Baker f.) Ali
- Astragalus pineticola Podlech
- Astragalus pinetorum Boiss.
- Astragalus pinonis M.E.Jones
- Astragalus piptocephalus Boiss. & Hausskn.
- Astragalus piranshahricus Maassoumi & Podlech
- Astragalus piscator Barneby & S.L.Welsh
- Astragalus piscinus (M.E.Jones) Barneby
- Astragalus pish-chakensis Maassoumi
- Astragalus pishanxianensis Podlech
- Astragalus pisidicus Boiss. & Heldr.
- Astragalus pissisi (Phil.) I.M.Johnst.
- Astragalus piutensis Barneby & Mabb.
- Astragalus plagiophacos Maassoumi & Podlech
- Astragalus plattensis Nutt.
- Astragalus platyfoliatus Maassoumi
- Astragalus platyfoliolatus Maassoumi
- Astragalus platyphyllus Kar. & Kir.
- Astragalus platysematus Bunge
- Astragalus platytropis A.Gray
- Astragalus plebeius Boiss.
- Astragalus pleianthus (Shinners) Isely
- Astragalus plumbeus (Nevski) Gontsch.
- Astragalus plumosus Willd.
- Astragalus pluriflorus F.Ghahrem., Maassoumi, Bagheri & Podlech
- Astragalus podlechii I.Deml
- Astragalus podocarpus C.A.Mey.
- Astragalus podoloboides Maassoumi
- Astragalus podolobus Boiss. & Hohen.
- Astragalus podosphaerus Boiss. & Hausskn.
- Astragalus polaris (Seem.) Benth.
- Astragalus polemoniacus Bunge
- Astragalus polhillii Podlech
- Astragalus poliotrichus Bornm.
- Astragalus politovii Krylov
- Astragalus polozhiae Timokhina
- Astragalus poluninii Podlech
- Astragalus polyacanthus Benth.
- Astragalus polyanthus Bunge
- Astragalus polybotrys Boiss.
- Astragalus polyceras Kar. & Kir.
- Astragalus polycladus Bureau & Franch.
- Astragalus polystachys Maassoumi
- Astragalus polytimeticus Popov
- Astragalus polyzygus Popov
- Astragalus pomonensis M.E.Jones
- Astragalus pomphocalyx Villarreal & M.A.Carranza
- Astragalus ponticus Pall.
- Astragalus popovii Pavlov
- Astragalus porphyreus Podlech & L.R.Xu
- Astragalus porphyrocalyx Y.C.Ho
- Astragalus porphyrodon C.C.Towns.
- Astragalus porphyrophysa Bornm. & Gauba
- Astragalus porrectus S.Watson
- Astragalus potosinus Barneby
- Astragalus praelongus E.Sheld.
- Astragalus praeteritus Podlech & L.R.Xu
- Astragalus pravitzii Podlech
- Astragalus preussii A.Gray
- Astragalus prilipkoanus Grossh.
- Astragalus pringlei S.Watson
- Astragalus procerus Boiss. & Hausskn.
- Astragalus proimanthus Barneby
- Astragalus prominens (Boriss.) Boriss.
- Astragalus proriferus M.E.Jones
- Astragalus prosgaeus Barneby
- Astragalus protectus Maassoumi & Podlech
- Astragalus protractus Boriss.
- Astragalus proximus (Rydb.) Wooton & Standl.
- Astragalus prusianus Boiss.
- Astragalus przewalskii Bunge ex Maxim.
- Astragalus przhevalskianus Podlech & N.Ulziykh.
- Astragalus psammophilus Golosk.
- Astragalus pseudanthylloides Gontsch.
- Astragalus pseudo-orthocarpus Ranjbar
- Astragalus pseudoadsurgens Jurtzev
- Astragalus pseudoamabilis Podlech & L.R.Xu
- Astragalus pseudoamygdalinus Popov
- Astragalus pseudoanisacanthus Amjad Khan, A.Sultan & Zarre
- Astragalus pseudoarvatensis Podlech & Sytin
- Astragalus pseudoaustralis Fisch. & C.A.Mey.
- Astragalus pseudobabatagi Pachom. & Rassulova
- Astragalus pseudobagramiensis Podlech
- Astragalus pseudobeckii Širj. & Rech.f.
- Astragalus pseudoborodinii S.B.Ho
- Astragalus pseudobrachystachys Širj. & Rech.f.
- Astragalus pseudocapito Podlech
- Astragalus pseudochlorostachys Ali
- Astragalus pseudocomosus Maassoumi, F.Ghahrem. & Bagheri
- Astragalus pseudocyclophyllus Rech.f.
- Astragalus pseudocylindraceus Bornm.
- Astragalus pseudocytisoides Popov
- Astragalus pseudodianthus Nabiev
- Astragalus pseudoeremophysa Popov
- Astragalus pseudofragifer Tietz
- Astragalus pseudofragrans C.C.Towns.
- Astragalus pseudogompholobium Podlech
- Astragalus pseudohofmeisteri Širj. & Rech.f.
- Astragalus pseudohypogaeus S.B.Ho
- Astragalus pseudoibicinus Maassoumi & Podlech
- Astragalus pseudoindurascens Širj. & Rech.f.
- Astragalus pseudojagnobicus Podlech & L.R.Xu
- Astragalus pseudojohannis Maassoumi & Podlech
- Astragalus pseudokurrumensis Širj. & Rech.f.
- Astragalus pseudomacrostachys Maassoumi
- Astragalus pseudomahoschanicus Podlech
- Astragalus pseudomegalomerus Popov
- Astragalus pseudomultijugus Podlech
- Astragalus pseudomurinus Naderi Safar & Maassoumi
- Astragalus pseudonigrescens Maassoumi
- Astragalus pseudonobilis Popov
- Astragalus pseudoparalurges F.Ghahrem., Maassoumi, Bagheri & Podlech
- Astragalus pseudopellitus Podlech
- Astragalus pseudopersicus Podlech & Maassoumi
- Astragalus pseudopinetorum Taeb, Özüdoğru & Erik
- Astragalus pseudopurpureus Guşul.
- Astragalus pseudoquisqualis Podlech
- Astragalus pseudorhacodes Gontsch.
- Astragalus pseudorigidulus Podlech
- Astragalus pseudorobustus Podlech & Maassoumi
- Astragalus pseudoroseus N.Ulziykh.
- Astragalus pseudoscoparius Gontsch.
- Astragalus pseudoshebarensis Podlech
- Astragalus pseudosinaicus Gazer & Podlech
- Astragalus pseudotataricus Boriss.
- Astragalus pseudotauricola (Ponert) Podlech
- Astragalus pseudotesticulatus Sanchir ex N.Ulziykh.
- Astragalus pseudotetrastichus M.N.Abdull.
- Astragalus pseudotitovii Podlech
- Astragalus pseudotomentellus Podlech
- Astragalus pseudotortuosus Tietz & Zarre
- Astragalus pseudoutriger Grossh.
- Astragalus pseudoversicolor Y.C.Ho
- Astragalus pseudovulpinus Sanchir ex N.Ulziykh.
- Astragalus pseudozagrosicus Maassoumi & Podlech
- Astragalus psilacanthus Boiss.
- Astragalus psilocentros Fisch.
- Astragalus psilodontius Boiss.
- Astragalus psiloglottis Steven ex DC.
- Astragalus psilolobus Puchkova
- Astragalus psilopus Schrenk
- Astragalus psilosepalus Podlech & L.R.Xu
- Astragalus psilostylus Bunge
- Astragalus pskemensis Popov
- Astragalus psoraloides Lam.
- Astragalus pterocarpus S.Watson
- Astragalus pterocephalus Bunge
- Astragalus ptilocephalus Baker
- Astragalus ptychophyllus Boiss.
- Astragalus pubentissimus Torr. & A.Gray
- Astragalus puberulus Ledeb.
- Astragalus pueblae M.E.Jones
- Astragalus pulcher Korovin
- Astragalus pullus N.D.Simpson
- Astragalus pulposus Popov
- Astragalus pulsiferae A.Gray
- Astragalus pulviniformis I.M.Johnst.
- Astragalus punae I.M.Johnst.
- Astragalus punctatus Bunge
- Astragalus pungens Willd.
- Astragalus puniceus Osterh.
- Astragalus purpurascens Bunge
- Astragalus purpurinus (Y.C.Ho) Podlech & L.R.Xu
- Astragalus purpusii M.E.Jones
- Astragalus purshii Douglas ex G.Don
- Astragalus pushtashanicus C.C.Towns.
- Astragalus pusillus Vogel
- Astragalus pycnocephalus Fisch.
- Astragalus pycnocladoides Hausskn. ex Bornm.
- Astragalus pycnolobus Bunge
- Astragalus pycnostachyus A.Gray
- Astragalus pyrrhotrichus Boiss.

== Q ==
- Astragalus qamardinianus N.Khan, A.Sultan & T.Khan
- Astragalus qaratchaicus Maassoumi, Ghahrem. & Javadi
- Astragalus qeydarnabiensis Bagheri, F.Ghahrem. & Maassoumi
- Astragalus qingheensis Y.X.Liou
- Astragalus qitaiensis Podlech & L.R.Xu
- Astragalus qohestanicus Nasseh & Maassoumi
- Astragalus qorvehensis Podlech
- Astragalus qoturensis Podlech
- Astragalus quinqueflorus S.Watson
- Astragalus quinquefoliolatus Bunge
- Astragalus quisqualis Bunge

== R ==
- Astragalus racemosus Pursh
- Astragalus raddei Basil.
- Astragalus radicans Hornem.
- Astragalus rafaelensis M.E.Jones
- Astragalus rahiminejadii Ranjbar
- Astragalus ramitensis Rassulova
- Astragalus raphaelis G.Ferro
- Astragalus raphiodontus Boiss.
- Astragalus rariflorus Ledeb.
- Astragalus rarissimus Popov
- Astragalus rashedmohasselii Nasseh
- Astragalus rassoulii Podlech
- Astragalus rassulovae Podlech
- Astragalus raswendicus Hausskn. & Bornm.
- Astragalus rattanii A.Gray
- Astragalus ravenii Barneby
- Astragalus rawianus C.C.Towns.
- Astragalus rawlinsianus Aitch. & Baker
- Astragalus razensis Nasseh & Joharchi
- Astragalus recognitus Fisch.
- Astragalus reconditus Podlech & Maassoumi
- Astragalus recurvatus Podlech
- Astragalus recurvus Greene
- Astragalus reduncus Pall.
- Astragalus reesei Maire
- Astragalus reflexistipulus Miq.
- Astragalus reflexus Torr. & A.Gray
- Astragalus refractus C.A.Mey.
- Astragalus regestus Maassoumi
- Astragalus regiomontanus Barneby
- Astragalus reichei Speg.
- Astragalus reinii Ball
- Astragalus remanens Nabiev
- Astragalus remotiflorus Boiss.
- Astragalus remotijugus Boiss. & Hohen.
- Astragalus remotispicatus Bagheri & Maassoumi
- Astragalus remotus (M.E.Jones) Barneby
- Astragalus renzianus Podlech
- Astragalus renzii Hub.-Mor.
- Astragalus repentinus Ekící & Podlech
- Astragalus reshadianus Podlech
- Astragalus retamocarpus Boiss. & Hohen.
- Astragalus reticulatovenosus Maassoumi & Podlech
- Astragalus reticulatus M.Bieb.
- Astragalus retusifoliatus Y.C.Ho
- Astragalus reuterianus Boiss.
- Astragalus reventiformis (Rydb.) Barneby
- Astragalus reventus A.Gray
- Astragalus reverdattoanus Sumnev.
- Astragalus rhabdophorus Bornm.
- Astragalus rhacodes Bunge
- Astragalus rhizanthus Benth.
- Astragalus rhizocephalus Baker
- Astragalus rhodochrous Boiss. & Hausskn.
- Astragalus rhododendrophilus Podlech & L.R.Xu
- Astragalus rhodosemius Boiss. & Hausskn.
- Astragalus richii A.Gray
- Astragalus rigidulus Benth. ex Bunge
- Astragalus rijabensis Maassoumi, Mozaff. & Bagheri
- Astragalus rimarum Bornm.
- Astragalus riouxii Rech.f.
- Astragalus riparius Barneby
- Astragalus ripleyi Barneby
- Astragalus robbinsii (Oakes) A.Gray
- Astragalus robustus Bunge
- Astragalus roemeri Simonk.
- Astragalus roessleri Podlech
- Astragalus rollovii Grossh.
- Astragalus romasanus Ulbr.
- Astragalus rosae Kirchhoff
- Astragalus roschanicus B.Fedtsch.
- Astragalus rosellus Širj. & Rech.f.
- Astragalus roseocalycinus V.A.Matthews
- Astragalus roseus Ledeb.
- Astragalus rostratus C.A.Mey.
- Astragalus rotundus Gontsch.
- Astragalus rousseanus Boiss.
- Astragalus rubellus Gontsch.
- Astragalus rubescens Kovalevsk. & Vved.
- Astragalus rubicalyx Maassoumi
- Astragalus rubicundus Podlech & Sytin
- Astragalus rubriflorus Bunge
- Astragalus rubrifolius V.V.Nikitin ex Kovalevsk.
- Astragalus rubrigalli Popov
- Astragalus rubriphysa Maassoumi & Khorrami
- Astragalus rubrivenosus Gontsch.
- Astragalus rubrocalycinus Maassoumi & Podlech
- Astragalus rubrolineatus Širj. & Rech.f.
- Astragalus rubromarginatus Czerniak.
- Astragalus rubrostriatus Bunge
- Astragalus rubtzovii Boriss.
- Astragalus rudimentus Maassoumi
- Astragalus rudolffii N.Ulziykh.
- Astragalus rufescens Freyn & Bornm.
- Astragalus ruiz-lealii I.M.Johnst.
- Astragalus rumelicus Bunge
- Astragalus rumpens Meffert
- Astragalus runemarkii Maassoumi & Podlech
- Astragalus rupertii Villarreal & M.A.Carranza
- Astragalus rupifragiformis Popov
- Astragalus rupifragus Pall.
- Astragalus rusbyi Greene
- Astragalus ruscifolius Boiss.
- Astragalus russanovii F.O.Khass., Sarybaeva & Esankulov
- Astragalus russellii Banks & Sol.
- Astragalus rytidocarpus Ledeb.
- Astragalus rytyensis Stepants.
- Astragalus rzaevii Grossh.

== S ==
- Astragalus saadatabadensis Podlech
- Astragalus sabetii Podlech & Maassoumi
- Astragalus sabuletorum Ledeb.
- Astragalus sabulonum A.Gray
- Astragalus sabulosus M.E.Jones
- Astragalus sabzakensis Kirchhoff
- Astragalus sabzevarensis Podlech & Zarre
- Astragalus saccatus Boiss.
- Astragalus saccocalyx Schrenk ex Fisch. & C.A.Mey.
- Astragalus sachalinensis Bunge
- Astragalus sachanewii Širj.
- Astragalus sachokianus Grossh.
- Astragalus sadiensis Podlech, L.R.Xu & C.Y.Chang
- Astragalus saetiger Becht
- Astragalus safavii Podlech & Maassoumi
- Astragalus saganlugensis Trautv.
- Astragalus sagastaigolensis N.Ulziykh. ex Podlech & L.R.Xu
- Astragalus sagasteguii Gómez-Sosa
- Astragalus sagitticarpus A.E.Estrada, Villarreal & Encina
- Astragalus saharae Pomel
- Astragalus sahendi Buhse ex Fisch.
- Astragalus saichanensis Sanchir
- Astragalus saidii F.O.Khass. & Esankulov
- Astragalus salangensis Podlech
- Astragalus salatavicus Bunge
- Astragalus salavatabadensis Podlech
- Astragalus salehabadensis Ranjbar & Zarin
- Astragalus salmakiae Podlech & Zarre
- Astragalus salmonis M.E.Jones
- Astragalus salsugineus Kar. & Kir.
- Astragalus sanandajianus Tietz
- Astragalus sanctae-crucis Speg.
- Astragalus sanctorum Barneby
- Astragalus sanctus Boiss.
- Astragalus sanczirii N.Ulziykh.
- Astragalus sandalaschensis Nikitina
- Astragalus sangcharakensis Podlech
- Astragalus sangesuricus Boriss.
- Astragalus sangimashensis Rech.f.
- Astragalus sangonensis Širj. & Rech.f.
- Astragalus sanguineus Rydb.
- Astragalus sanguinolentus M.Bieb.
- Astragalus saphronovae Kulikov
- Astragalus sarabensis Maassoumi & Podlech
- Astragalus sarae Eig
- Astragalus saralensis Gontsch.
- Astragalus saratagius Bunge
- Astragalus sarbasnensis B.Fedtsch.
- Astragalus sarchanensis Gontsch.
- Astragalus sarcocolla Dymock
- Astragalus saremii Maassoumi
- Astragalus sarikamishensis Podlech
- Astragalus sarygorensis Rassulova
- Astragalus sarytavicus Popov
- Astragalus sarzehensis Ranjbar
- Astragalus sata-kandaoensis Podlech
- Astragalus satoi Kitag.
- Astragalus satteotoichos Gontsch.
- Astragalus saurinus Barneby
- Astragalus savanatensis Ranjbar, Vitek & Mahmoudian
- Astragalus savellanicus Podlech
- Astragalus saxifractor Rech.f. & Gilli
- Astragalus saxorum N.D.Simpson
- Astragalus scaberrimus Bunge
- Astragalus scabrifolius Boiss.
- Astragalus scabrisetus Bong.
- Astragalus scalaris S.Watson
- Astragalus scaphoides (M.E.Jones) Rydb.
- Astragalus scapiger Ranjbar & Maassoumi
- Astragalus schachdarinus Lipsky
- Astragalus schachimardanus Basil.
- Astragalus schahrudensis Bunge
- Astragalus schanginianus Pall.
- Astragalus schelichowii Turcz.
- Astragalus schemachensis Karjagin
- Astragalus scheremetevianus O.Fedtsch.
- Astragalus schimperi Boiss.
- Astragalus schinetorum Barneby
- Astragalus schizopterus Boiss.
- Astragalus schizotropis Murb.
- Astragalus schmakovii Skatschko
- Astragalus schmalhausenii Bunge
- Astragalus schmidii Podlech
- Astragalus schmolliae Ced.Porter
- Astragalus scholerianus Bornm.
- Astragalus schottianus Boiss.
- Astragalus schrenkianus Fisch. & C.A.Mey.
- Astragalus schugnanicus B.Fedtsch.
- Astragalus schumilovae Polozhij
- Astragalus schutensis Gontsch.
- Astragalus sciadophorus Franch.
- Astragalus sciureus Boiss. & Hohen.
- Astragalus sclerocarpus A.Gray
- Astragalus sclerocladus Bunge
- Astragalus scleropodius Ledeb.
- Astragalus scleroxylon Bunge
- Astragalus scopaeformis Ledeb.
- Astragalus scoparius Schrenk ex Fisch. & C.A.Mey.
- Astragalus scopulorum Porter
- Astragalus scorpioides Pourr. ex Willd.
- Astragalus scorpiurus Bunge
- Astragalus scutaneus Barneby
- Astragalus secretus Podlech & L.R.Xu
- Astragalus secundiflorus Rassulova
- Astragalus sedaensis Y.C.Ho
- Astragalus segregatus Zarre & Podlech
- Astragalus seidabadensis Bunge
- Astragalus semenovii Bunge
- Astragalus semicircularis P.C.Li
- Astragalus semideserti Gontsch.
- Astragalus semilunatus Podlech
- Astragalus semiromensis Podlech & Maassoumi
- Astragalus semnanensis Bornm. & Rech.f.
- Astragalus sempervirens Lam.
- Astragalus senilis Bornm.
- Astragalus sepultipes (Barneby) Barneby
- Astragalus serenoi (Kuntze) E.Sheld.
- Astragalus sericeocanus Gontsch.
- Astragalus sericeopuberulus Boriss.
- Astragalus sericoleucus A.Gray
- Astragalus sericopetalus Trautv.
- Astragalus sericophyllus Griseb.
- Astragalus sericostachys Stocks
- Astragalus serpens M.E.Jones
- Astragalus serpentinicola H.Duman & Ekim
- Astragalus sertavulensis Aytaç & Çeçen
- Astragalus sesameus L.
- Astragalus sesamoides Boiss.
- Astragalus sesquiflorus S.Watson
- Astragalus sessiliflorus Podlech & Zarre
- Astragalus setosulus Gontsch.
- Astragalus setsureianus Nakai
- Astragalus setulosus Boiss. & Balansa
- Astragalus sevangensis Grossh.
- Astragalus sewertzowii Bunge
- Astragalus shabilensis Podlech & Maassoumi
- Astragalus shaerqinensis L.Liu & Z.Y.Li
- Astragalus shagalensis Grossh.
- Astragalus shahinii Podlech & Maassoumi
- Astragalus shahsavaranicus Maassoumi
- Astragalus shahsavarii Maassoumi & Podlech
- Astragalus sharestanicus Podlech & I.Deml
- Astragalus shatuensis Podlech
- Astragalus shebarensis Podlech
- Astragalus shehbazii Zarre & Podlech
- Astragalus sheldonii (Rydb.) Barneby
- Astragalus shelkovnikovii Grossh.
- Astragalus sherriffii Podlech
- Astragalus shevockii Barneby
- Astragalus shinanensis Ohwi
- Astragalus shiroumaensis Makino
- Astragalus shogotensis Podlech
- Astragalus shortianus Nutt.
- Astragalus shuturunkuhensis Podlech
- Astragalus siahcheshmehensis Maassoumi & Podlech
- Astragalus siahderrensis Širj. & Rech.f.
- Astragalus sibthorpianus Boiss.
- Astragalus sichuanensis L.Meng, X.Y.Zhu & P.K.Hsiao
- Astragalus siculus Biv.
- Astragalus sieberi DC.
- Astragalus sieversianus Pall.
- Astragalus sigmoideus Bunge
- Astragalus sikkimensis Benth. ex Bunge
- Astragalus sikokianus Nakai
- Astragalus siliceus Barneby
- Astragalus silifkeense Dinç, Aytaç & Doğu
- Astragalus siliquosus Boiss.
- Astragalus silvisteppaceus Knjaz.
- Astragalus simakanensis Maassoumi & Hatami
- Astragalus similissimus Podlech & Zarre
- Astragalus simonii Hub.-Mor.
- Astragalus simplicifolius (Nutt.) A.Gray
- Astragalus sinaicus Boiss.
- Astragalus sinaloae Barneby
- Astragalus singarensis Boiss. & Hausskn.
- Astragalus sinicus L.
- Astragalus sinkiangensis Podlech & L.R.Xu
- Astragalus sinuatus Piper
- Astragalus sirinicus Ten.
- Astragalus sirjaevii Zarre, Maassoumi & Podlech
- Astragalus sisakhtianus Podlech & Maassoumi
- Astragalus sisyrodytes Bunge
- Astragalus sitiens Bunge
- Astragalus sivendicus Podlech & Maassoumi
- Astragalus skvortsovii Sytin & L.V.Rjaz.
- Astragalus skythropos Bunge
- Astragalus smithianus E.Peter
- Astragalus sobolevskiae Polozhij
- Astragalus sogdianus Bunge
- Astragalus sogotensis Lipsky
- Astragalus sohrevardianus Bagheri, Maassoumi & F.Ghahrem.
- Astragalus sojakii Podlech
- Astragalus solandri Lowe
- Astragalus solitarius M.Peck
- Astragalus somcheticus K.Koch
- Astragalus sophoroides M.E.Jones
- Astragalus sorgerae Hub.-Mor. & D.F.Chamb.
- Astragalus sosnowskyi Grossh.
- Astragalus souliei N.D.Simpson
- Astragalus soxmaniorum Lundell
- Astragalus spachianiformis Podlech & Maassoumi
- Astragalus spachianus Boiss. & Buhse
- Astragalus spaldingii A.Gray
- Astragalus sparsiflorus A.Gray
- Astragalus sparsipilis Hub.-Mor. & D.F.Chamb.
- Astragalus sparsus Decne.
- Astragalus spartioides Kar. & Kir.
- Astragalus spatulatus E.Sheld.
- Astragalus speciosissimus Pavlov
- Astragalus speciosus Boiss. & Hohen.
- Astragalus spectabilis Schischk.
- Astragalus spegazzinii I.M.Johnst.
- Astragalus speirocarpus A.Gray
- Astragalus spellenbergii A.E.Estrada, S.González & Villarreal
- Astragalus sphaeranthus Boiss.
- Astragalus sphaerocystis Bunge
- Astragalus sphaerophysa Kar. & Kir.
- Astragalus spinosus (Forssk.) Muschl.
- Astragalus spitzenbergeri Podlech
- Astragalus splendidissimus Širj. & Rech.f.
- Astragalus sprucei I.M.Johnst.
- Astragalus spruneri Boiss.
- Astragalus spryginii Popov
- Astragalus squarrosus Bunge
- Astragalus stalinskyi Širj.
- Astragalus steinbergianus Sumnev.
- Astragalus steinerianus Podlech
- Astragalus stella L.
- Astragalus stenanthus Bunge
- Astragalus stenocarpus Gontsch.
- Astragalus stenoceras C.A.Mey.
- Astragalus stenoceroides Boriss.
- Astragalus stenocystis Bunge
- Astragalus stenolepis Fisch.
- Astragalus stenopterus Širj. & Rech.f.
- Astragalus stenosemioides Bornm. ex D.F.Chamb. & V.A.Matthews
- Astragalus stenosemius Boiss. & Noë
- Astragalus stenostegius Boiss. & Hausskn.
- Astragalus stepporum Podlech
- Astragalus sterilis Barneby
- Astragalus stevenianus DC.
- Astragalus stewartii Baker
- Astragalus stipitatus Benth. ex Bunge
- Astragalus stipulatus D.Don ex Sims
- Astragalus stocksii Benth. ex Bunge
- Astragalus storozhevae Knjaz.
- Astragalus straturensis M.E.Jones
- Astragalus straussii Hausskn. ex Bornm.
- Astragalus striatiflorus M.E.Jones
- Astragalus strictifolius Boiss.
- Astragalus strictissimus Podlech & Zarre
- Astragalus strictus Benth.
- Astragalus stridii Kit Tan
- Astragalus strigillosus Bunge
- Astragalus strigosostipulatus Rech.f. & Köie
- Astragalus strigulosus Kunth
- Astragalus strizhovae Ovcz. & Rassulova
- Astragalus subalpinus Boiss. & Buhse
- Astragalus subansiriensis Podlech
- Astragalus subarcuatus Popov
- Astragalus subaspadanus Maassoumi, F.Ghahrem. & Bagheri
- Astragalus subauriculatus Gontsch.
- Astragalus subbijugus Ledeb.
- Astragalus subbrevidens Maassoumi
- Astragalus subcaracugensis Sitpaeva
- Astragalus subcaulescens Ledeb.
- Astragalus subcinereus A.Gray
- Astragalus suberosus Banks & Sol.
- Astragalus subexcedens Gontsch.
- Astragalus subglaberrimus Podlech & Maassoumi
- Astragalus subhanensis Ghahr.-Nejad & Behçet
- Astragalus subinduratus Gontsch.
- Astragalus subkohrudicus Maassoumi, F.Ghahrem. & Bagheri
- Astragalus sublaguriformis Bagheri, Maassoumi & F.Ghahrem.
- Astragalus submaculatus Boriss.
- Astragalus submitis Boiss. & Hohen.
- Astragalus submontanus Podlech
- Astragalus subpenicillatus Podlech
- Astragalus subpentanthus Maassoumi & Podlech
- Astragalus subrecognitus Bagheri, Maassoumi & F.Ghahrem.
- Astragalus subrosulariformis Širj. & Rech.f.
- Astragalus subrosularis Gontsch.
- Astragalus subscaposus Popov ex Boriss.
- Astragalus subschachimardanus Popov
- Astragalus subsecundus Boiss. & Hohen.
- Astragalus subspinescens Popov
- Astragalus subspongocarpus Ovcz. & Rassulova
- Astragalus substenoceras Boriss.
- Astragalus substipitatus Gontsch.
- Astragalus subternatus Pavlov
- Astragalus subtrijugus Popov
- Astragalus subuliformis DC.
- Astragalus subumbellatus Klotzsch
- Astragalus subverticillatus Gontsch.
- Astragalus subvestitus (Jeps.) Barneby
- Astragalus succumbens Douglas ex Hook.
- Astragalus suffalcatus Bunge
- Astragalus sufianicus Podlech & Sytin
- Astragalus sulcatus L.
- Astragalus sulfuratus Širj. & Rech.f.
- Astragalus suluklensis Freyn & Sint.
- Astragalus sumarensis Maassoumi
- Astragalus sumbari Popov
- Astragalus sumneviczii Pavlov
- Astragalus sungpanensis E.Peter
- Astragalus superfluus Rech.f. & Köie
- Astragalus supervisus (Kuntze) E.Sheld.
- Astragalus supinus C.A.Mey. ex Bunge
- Astragalus supralaevis Podlech & L.R.Xu
- Astragalus surchobi Gontsch.
- Astragalus surugensis Boiss. & Hausskn.
- Astragalus suserianus Podlech & Ekici
- Astragalus susianus Boiss.
- Astragalus sutchuenensis Franch.
- Astragalus swatensis Podlech & Zarre
- Astragalus sympileicalycinus Maassoumi & Nasseh
- Astragalus sympileicarpus Rech.f.
- Astragalus syreitschikovii Pavlov
- Astragalus syriacus L.
- Astragalus syringus D.F.Chamb.
- Astragalus szovitsii Fisch. & C.A.Mey.

== T ==
- Astragalus tabrizianus Fisch.
- Astragalus tacorensis Gómez-Sosa
- Astragalus tadmorensis Eig & Sam.
- Astragalus taebiae Zarre & Podlech
- Astragalus tahbaziae Zarre & Podlech
- Astragalus taipaishanensis C.Y.Ho & S.B.Ho
- Astragalus taiyuanensis S.B.Ho
- Astragalus takharensis Podlech
- Astragalus takhtadzhjanii Grossh.
- Astragalus talasseus Boiss. & Balansa
- Astragalus talassicus Popov
- Astragalus taldycensis Franch.
- Astragalus taledensis P.Yan & Huan Zhang
- Astragalus taleshensis Bidarlord, F.Ghahrem. & Maassoumi
- Astragalus talimansurensis Širj. & Rech.f.
- Astragalus tamiricus N.Ulziykh.
- Astragalus tanaiticus K.Koch
- Astragalus tanchasii Gontsch.
- Astragalus taochius Woronow
- Astragalus tarijensis Wedd.
- Astragalus tarumensis Širj. & Rech.f.
- Astragalus taschkendicus Bunge
- Astragalus taschkutanus V.A.Nikitin
- Astragalus tatjanae Lincz.
- Astragalus tatlii Peșmen
- Astragalus taubertianus Asch. & Barbey ex E.A.Durand & Barratte
- Astragalus tauricola Boiss.
- Astragalus tavakolii Maassoumi
- Astragalus tawilicus C.C.Towns.
- Astragalus taygeteus Jim.Perss. & Strid
- Astragalus teberdensis Grossh. ex Fed.
- Astragalus tecti-mundi Freyn
- Astragalus tefreschensis Hausskn. ex Bornm.
- Astragalus tegetarioides M.E.Jones
  - Astragalus tegetarioides var. anxius (Meinke & Kaye) S.L.Welsh, syn. Astragalus anxius Meinke & Kaye
- Astragalus tegulensis Bacch. & Brullo
- Astragalus teheranicus Boiss. & Hohen.
- Astragalus tehuelches Speg.
- Astragalus tekabensis Maassoumi & Maroofi
- Astragalus tekesensis S.B.Ho
- Astragalus tekessicus Bajtenov
- Astragalus temirensis Popov
- Astragalus tenellus Pursh
- Astragalus tener A.Gray
- Astragalus tennesseensis A.Gray ex Chapm.
- Astragalus tenuicaulis Bunge
- Astragalus tenuiramosus Podlech & Zarre
- Astragalus tenuis Turcz.
- Astragalus tenuiscapus Freyn & Bornm.
- Astragalus tenuissimus Zarre & Podlech
- Astragalus tephrodes A.Gray
- Astragalus tephrolobus Bunge
- Astragalus tephrosioides Boiss.
- Astragalus terekliensis Gontsch.
- Astragalus terektensis Fisjun
- Astragalus tergeminus (Knjaz., Kulikov & E.G.Philippov) Knjaz.
- Astragalus termeanus Maassoumi & Podlech
- Astragalus terminalis S.Watson
- Astragalus terraccianoi Vals.
- Astragalus terrae-rubrae Butkov
- Astragalus terrestris Kitam.
- Astragalus teskhemicus Sytin & Shaulo
- Astragalus tesquorum Podlech & L.R.Xu
- Astragalus testiculatus Pall.
- Astragalus tetrapterus A.Gray
- Astragalus tetrastichus Bunge
- Astragalus tetuanensis Podlech
- Astragalus thaumasios Podlech
- Astragalus thermensis Vals.
- Astragalus thlaspi Lipsky
- Astragalus thomsonii Podlech
- Astragalus thracicus Griseb.
- Astragalus thurberi A.Gray
- Astragalus tibetanus Benth. ex Bunge
- Astragalus tibeticola Podlech & L.R.Xu
- Astragalus tidestromii (Rydb.) Clokey
- Astragalus tiehmii Barneby
- Astragalus tietziae Ghahr. & Zarre
- Astragalus tigridis Boiss.
- Astragalus tijuanensis A.E.Estrada, Rebman, C.González & Villarreal
- Astragalus tioides (Rydb.) Barneby
- Astragalus titanophilus Barneby
- Astragalus titovii Gontsch.
- Astragalus tmoleus Boiss.
- Astragalus toanus M.E.Jones
- Astragalus tokachiensis T.Yamaz. & Kadota
- Astragalus toksunensis S.B.Ho
- Astragalus tolmaczevii Jurtzev
- Astragalus tolucanus B.L.Rob. & Seaton
- Astragalus tomentellus Podlech
- Astragalus tongolensis Ulbr.
- Astragalus toppinianus Ali
- Astragalus toquimanus Barneby
- Astragalus torbathaydariyehensis Ranjbar & Zarin
- Astragalus tortipes J.L.Anderson & J.M.Porter
- Astragalus tortuosus DC.
- Astragalus touranicus Freitag & Podlech
- Astragalus townsendii Zarre, Maassoumi & Podlech
- Astragalus trabzonicus Ekící, Aytaç & Akan
- Astragalus trachoniticus Post
- Astragalus trachyacanthos Fisch.
- Astragalus trachycarpus Gontsch.
- Astragalus trachytrichus Bunge
- Astragalus tragacantha L.
- Astragalus transecticola Podlech & L.R.Xu
- Astragalus transjordanicus Sam. ex Rech.f.
- Astragalus transnominatus M.N.Abdull.
- Astragalus transoxanus Fisch.
- Astragalus traskiae Eastw.
- Astragalus tremolsianus Pau
- Astragalus tribuloides Delile
- Astragalus tricarinatus A.Gray
- Astragalus trichanthus Golosk.
- Astragalus trichocarpus Benth.
- Astragalus tricholobus DC.
- Astragalus trichopodus (Nutt.) A.Gray
- Astragalus trichostigma Bunge
- Astragalus tridactylicus A.Gray
- Astragalus triflorus (DC.) A.Gray
- Astragalus trifoliatus Phil.
- Astragalus trifoliolatus Boiss.
- Astragalus trigonocarpus (Turcz.) Bunge
- Astragalus trigonus DC.
- Astragalus trijugus Podlech & L.R.Xu
- Astragalus trimestris L.
- Astragalus triradiatus Bunge
- Astragalus troglodytus S.Watson
- Astragalus truncatoalatus Širj. & Rech.f.
- Astragalus tsangpoensis Podlech & L.R.Xu
- Astragalus tscharynensis Popov
- Astragalus tschimganicus Popov
- Astragalus tschujensis Bunge
- Astragalus tshegemensis Galushko
- Astragalus tugarinovii Basil.
- Astragalus tulinovii B.Fedtsch.
- Astragalus tumbatsica C.Marquand & Airy Shaw
- Astragalus tumninensis Pavlova & Bassargin
- Astragalus tuna-ekimii Adıgüzel
- Astragalus tungensis N.D.Simpson
- Astragalus tupalangi Gontsch.
- Astragalus turajgyricus Golosk.
- Astragalus turbinatus Bunge
- Astragalus turcicus Sümbül
- Astragalus turcomanicus (Bunge) Bunge
- Astragalus turczaninowii Kar. & Kir.
- Astragalus turgidus R.R.Rao & Balodi
- Astragalus turkestanus Bunge ex Boiss.
- Astragalus turkman-chaiensis Maassoumi, Mozaff. & Ramezani
- Astragalus turkmenensis Dural, Tugay & Ertuğrul
- Astragalus turkmenorum (Boriss.) Širj.
- Astragalus turolensis Pau
- Astragalus tuyehensis Ghahr., Maassoumi & Ghahr.-Nejad
- Astragalus tweedyi Canby
- Astragalus tyghensis M.Peck
- Astragalus tymphresteus Boiss. & Spruner
- Astragalus typhiformis Maassoumi
- Astragalus tyttocarpus Gontsch.

== U ==
- Astragalus ucrainicus Popov & Klokov
- Astragalus ugamicus Popov
- Astragalus uhlwormianus Freyn & Bornm.
- Astragalus uliginosus L.
- Astragalus ulrichianus Podlech
- Astragalus ulziykhutagii Sytin
- Astragalus umbellatus Bunge
- Astragalus umbraticus E.Sheld.
- Astragalus unalii Çeçen, Aytaç & H.Misirdali
- Astragalus uncialis Barneby
- Astragalus uniflorus DC.
- Astragalus unifoliatus Bunge
- Astragalus unijugus Bunge
- Astragalus unilateralis Kar. & Kir.
- Astragalus unilocularis Kamelin & Pachom.
- Astragalus uninodis Popov & Vved.
- Astragalus uraniolimneus Boiss.
- Astragalus urbanianus Ulbr.
- Astragalus urbanus Podlech & Maassoumi
- Astragalus urgunensis Podlech
- Astragalus urgutinus Lipsky
- Astragalus urmiensis Bunge
- Astragalus urunguensis N.Ulziykh.
- Astragalus ustiurtensis Bunge
- Astragalus utahensis (Torr.) Torr. & A.Gray
- Astragalus utriger Pall.
- Astragalus uttaranchalensis L.B.Chaudhary & Z.H.Khan

== V ==
- Astragalus vaccarum A.Gray
- Astragalus vaginans DC.
- Astragalus vaginatus Pall.
- Astragalus vagus (Clos) Reiche
- Astragalus valdeviolaceus Brullo, Giusso & Musarella
- Astragalus valerianensis I.M.Johnst.
- Astragalus valerii N.Ulziykh.
- Astragalus vallaris M.E.Jones
- Astragalus vallestris Kamelin
- Astragalus vallicoides A.P.Khokhr.
- Astragalus vallicola Gontsch.
- Astragalus vallis-astoris Podlech & Zarre
- Astragalus vanillae Boiss.
- Astragalus vardziae Kharadze & Chinth.
- Astragalus variabilis Bunge ex Maxim.
- Astragalus variegatus Franch.
- Astragalus varius S.G.Gmel.
- Astragalus varus (J.F.Macbr.) Gómez-Sosa
- Astragalus varzobicus Gontsch.
- Astragalus vassilczenkoanus Golosk.
- Astragalus vassilczenkoi Berdyev
- Astragalus vavilovii Fed. & Tamamsch.
- Astragalus vegetior Gontsch.
- Astragalus vegetus Bunge
- Astragalus veiskaramii Zarre, Podlech & Sabaii
- Astragalus velatus Trautv.
- Astragalus velenovskyi Nábělek
- Astragalus venturii I.M.Johnst.
- Astragalus venulosus Boiss.
- Astragalus vepres Zarre & Podlech
- Astragalus verae Širj.
- Astragalus veresczaginii Krylov & Sumnev.
- Astragalus vereskensis Maassoumi & Podlech
- Astragalus vernaculus Podlech
- Astragalus verrucosus Moris
- Astragalus versicolor Pall.
- Astragalus versipilus Rech.f. & Köie
- Astragalus verticillatus (Phil.) Reiche
- Astragalus verus Olivier
- Astragalus vescus Podlech & L.R.Xu
- Astragalus vesicarius L.
- Astragalus vesiculosus Clos
- Astragalus vessaliae Maassoumi & Podlech
- Astragalus vestitus Boiss. & Heldr.
- Astragalus vexans Rech.f. & Köie
- Astragalus vexillaris Boiss.
- Astragalus vexilliflexus E.Sheld.
- Astragalus vicarius Lipsky
- Astragalus vicia Širj. & Rech.f.
- Astragalus vicinalis Zarre & Podlech
- Astragalus villosissimus Bunge
- Astragalus villosulus Podlech
- Astragalus villosus Michx.
- Astragalus virens Pavlov
- Astragalus viridiflavus N.Ulziykh.
- Astragalus viridiflorus Boriss.
- Astragalus viridiformis Širj.
- Astragalus viridis Bunge
- Astragalus viridissimus Freyn & Sint.
- Astragalus visibilis Podlech & L.R.Xu
- Astragalus visunicus Kuczer.
- Astragalus vladimiri-komarovii B.Fedtsch.
- Astragalus vogelii (Webb) Bornm.
- Astragalus volkii Rech.f.
- Astragalus vulcanicus Bornm.
- Astragalus vulnerariae DC.
- Astragalus vulpinus Willd.
- Astragalus vvedenskyi Popov

== W ==
- Astragalus wachschi B.Fedtsch.
- Astragalus wagneri Bartl. ex Bunge
- Astragalus wardii A.Gray
- Astragalus waterfallii Barneby
- Astragalus webberi A.Gray
- Astragalus webbianus Benth.
- Astragalus weberbaueri Ulbr.
- Astragalus weddellianus (Kuntze) I.M.Johnst.
- Astragalus weirianus Aitch. & Baker
- Astragalus weixinensis Y.C.Ho
- Astragalus welshii Barneby
- Astragalus wendelboi I.Deml
- Astragalus wenquanensis S.B.Ho
- Astragalus werdermannii I.M.Johnst.
- Astragalus wetherillii M.E.Jones
- Astragalus whitneyi A.Gray
- Astragalus wilhelminae I.Deml
- Astragalus williamsii Britton & Rydb.
- Astragalus willisii Popov
- Astragalus wilmottianus Stoj.
- Astragalus wingatanus S.Watson
- Astragalus winkleri Trautv.
- Astragalus wittmannii Barneby
- Astragalus wolgensis Bunge
- Astragalus wolungensis P.C.Li
- Astragalus woodruffii M.E.Jones
- Astragalus wootonii E.Sheld.
- Astragalus wrightii A.Gray
- Astragalus wui Idrees & Z.Yong Zhang
- Astragalus wulingensis Jia X.Li & X.L.Yu
- Astragalus wulumuquanus F.T.Wang & Tang ex K.T.Fu
- Astragalus wushanicus N.D.Simpson

== X ==
- Astragalus xanthomeloides Korovin & Popov
- Astragalus xanthotrichos Ledeb.
- Astragalus xanthoxiphidiopsis Rech.f.
- Astragalus xerophiloides Podlech & Ekici
- Astragalus xerophilus Ledeb.
- Astragalus xijiangensis L.R.Xu & Y.H.Wu
- Astragalus xiphidioides Freyn & Sint.
- Astragalus xiphidiopsis Bornm.
- Astragalus xiphidium Bunge
- Astragalus xiphoides (Barneby) Barneby
- Astragalus xipholobus Popov
- Astragalus xitaibaicus (K.T.Fu) Podlech & L.R.Xu
- Astragalus xylocladus Rech.f. & Gilli

== Y ==
- Astragalus yamamotoi Miyabe & Tatew.
- Astragalus yanerwoensis Podlech & L.R.Xu
- Astragalus yangchangii Podlech & L.R.Xu
- Astragalus yangii C.Chen & Zi G.Qian
- Astragalus yangtzeanus N.D.Simpson
- Astragalus yazdii (Vassilcz.) Podlech & Maassoumi
- Astragalus yechengensis Podlech & L.R.Xu
- Astragalus yidunensis Podlech
- Astragalus yildirimlii Aytaç & Ekici
- Astragalus yilmazii Aytaç & M.Ekící
- Astragalus yoder-williamsii Barneby
- Astragalus yosiianus Kitam.
- Astragalus yukselii Karaman & Aytaç
- Astragalus yumenensis S.B.Ho
- Astragalus yunnanensis Franch.
- Astragalus yunningensis H.T.Tsai & T.T.Yu
- Astragalus yuralicus Boiss.
- Astragalus yushensis Sabaii, Zarre & Podlech
- Astragalus yutianensis Podlech & L.R.Xu

== Z ==
- Astragalus zaaminensis F.O.Khass. & Esankulov
- Astragalus zacatecanus (Rydb.) Barneby
- Astragalus zacharensis Bunge
- Astragalus zachlensis Bunge
- Astragalus zadaensis Podlech & L.R.Xu
- Astragalus zagrosicus Boiss. & Hausskn.
- Astragalus zaissanensis Sumnev.
- Astragalus zangooeianus Maassoumi, Safavi & Nasseh
- Astragalus zanjanensis Podlech & Maassoumi
- Astragalus zanskarensis Benth. ex Bunge
- Astragalus zaprjagaevii Gontsch.
- Astragalus zaraensis Podlech
- Astragalus zarokoensis Rassulova
- Astragalus zarreanus Ranjbar
- Astragalus zayuensis C.C.Ni & P.C.Li
- Astragalus zederbaueri Stadlm.
- Astragalus zerabulaki Popov
- Astragalus zerdanus Boiss.
- Astragalus zhiganicus L.Kuznetsova
- Astragalus zhouquinus K.T.Fu
- Astragalus ziaratensis Podlech
- Astragalus zingeri Korsh.
- Astragalus zionis M.E.Jones
- Astragalus zoharyi Eig
- Astragalus zoshkensis Ghahr.-Nejad
- Astragalus zurmatensis Podlech & Zarre

== See also ==
- List of the largest genera of flowering plants
- List of species of Astragalus (in Russian)
