= Astragalus yumenensis =

Scientific classification
- Kingdom: Plantae
- Clade: Embryophytes
- Clade: Tracheophytes
- Clade: Angiosperms
- Clade: Eudicots
- Clade: Rosids
- Order: Fabales
- Family: Fabaceae
- Subfamily: Faboideae
- Genus: Astragalus
- Species: A. yumenensis

Binomial name
- Astragalus yumenensis S.B.Ho ex Podlech & L.R.Xu

Species of flowering plant

Astragalus yumenensis is a species of flowering plant in the family Fabaceae. It is a perennial with purplish-red flowers. The species is native to China and Mongolia, and was first validly described in 2003.

== Taxonomy ==
The species name was first published by Shan Bao Ho in 1994, though that description was invalid, as two type specimens were cited. A valid description was published by Dietrich Podlech and Lang Ran Xu in 2003.

== Distribution ==
Astragalus yumenensis is native to the temperate biome of China (north-central, Inner Mongolia, Gansu, and Qinghai) and Mongolia.

It grows on arid slopes and alluvial fans, at elevations of 2,000–3,000 metres (6,600–9,800 ft).

== Description ==
Astragalus yumenensis is a perennial. It grows 15–30 centimetres (5.9–11.8 in) high. The plant has several stems, which are 2–10 centimetres (0.79–3.94 in) long, and covered in white hairs.

The leaves are 5–12 centimetres (2.0–4.7 in) long, and have 2–5 centimetres (0.79–1.97 in) stems. The plant has two or three pairs of leaflets. The leaflets are 10–25 millimetres (0.39–0.98 in) long, and 1–3 millimetres (0.039–0.118 in) wide.

The inflorescence is a 3–4 centimetres (1.2–1.6 in) long raceme, which grows on a 7–15 centimetres (2.8–5.9 in) stem. The calyx is a narrow tube measuring 8–12 millimetres (0.31–0.47 in) long. The calyx has 2–4 millimetres (0.079–0.157 in) long teeth, and is covered with black and white hairs. The petals are purplish red. The standard is narrowly obovate, 17–10 millimetres (0.67–0.39 in) long, and 6–7 millimetres (0.24–0.28 in) wide. The wings are 14–18 millimetres (0.55–0.71 in) long. The keel is 10–15 millimetres (0.39–0.59 in) long. The plant flowers in May and June.

The fruit is a straight to slightly curved legume, which is 10–15 millimetres (0.39–0.59 in) long, and around 2 millimetres (0.079 in) wide. The legume has two locules, and lacks a stem. The fruit ripens from June to August. Each valve has three or four seeds.

== Nomenclature ==
In Chinese, the species is known as 玉门黄耆 (yu men huang qi).
