= Astragalus accidens =

Scientific classification
- Kingdom: Plantae
- Clade: Embryophytes
- Clade: Tracheophytes
- Clade: Spermatophytes
- Clade: Angiosperms
- Clade: Eudicots
- Clade: Rosids
- Order: Fabales
- Family: Fabaceae
- Subfamily: Faboideae
- Genus: Astragalus
- Species: A. accidens

Binomial name
- Astragalus accidens S. Watson

Species of flowering plant

Astragalus accidens, more commonly known as the Rogue River milkvetch, is a species of herbaceous perennial plant in the family Fabaceae.

== Description ==
Astragalus accidens usually has a stem that is less than a meter tall with white flowers.

== Distribution and habitat ==
This species is native to western USA, specifically California and small section of southern Oregon.
