= Astragalus campylanthus =

Scientific classification
- Kingdom: Plantae
- Clade: Embryophytes
- Clade: Tracheophytes
- Clade: Spermatophytes
- Clade: Angiosperms
- Clade: Eudicots
- Clade: Rosids
- Order: Fabales
- Family: Fabaceae
- Subfamily: Faboideae
- Genus: Astragalus
- Species: A. campylanthus

Binomial name
- Astragalus campylanthus Boiss.

Synonyms
- Tragacantha campylantha (Boiss.) Kuntze

Species of flowering plant

Astragalus campylanthus is a species of milkvetch in the family Fabaceae. It is native to western and central Iran.
