= Astragalus xitaibaicus =

Scientific classification
- Kingdom: Plantae
- Clade: Tracheophytes
- Clade: Angiosperms
- Clade: Eudicots
- Clade: Rosids
- Order: Fabales
- Family: Fabaceae
- Subfamily: Faboideae
- Genus: Astragalus
- Species: A. xitaibaicus

Binomial name
- Astragalus xitaibaicus K.T. Fu

Synonyms
- Astragalus monadelphus subsp. xitaibaicus K.T.Fu

Species of flowering plant

Astragalus xitaibaicus is a species of flowering plant in the family Fabaceae.

== Distribution ==
Astragalus xitaibaicus is native to the Shaanxi region of China. It is found in alpine grasslands, at elevations from 2,800 to 3,300m.

== Description ==
Astragalus xitaibaicus grows to 12-22 cm tall, and is smooth except for parts of the flower. It has several stems, each up to 4mm thick. The leaves are 4-8cm long, and the leaf stem is 1-2cm. Leaflets grow in 5-7 pairs, and are ovate or elliptical. The leaflets are 10-18mm long, and 5-9 mm wide. The leaf apex is rounded. The flower stalk is 4-7.5 cm long. The calyx is bell shaped, 7.5-9 mm in size, and has narrow tapering teeth. The flowers are yellow. The stamen tube is closed. The legumes have 5-6mm stalks, and are narrowly ellipsoid.

It is a perennial.
