= Astragalus siliquosus =

Scientific classification
- Kingdom: Plantae
- Clade: Embryophytes
- Clade: Tracheophytes
- Clade: Spermatophytes
- Clade: Angiosperms
- Clade: Eudicots
- Clade: Rosids
- Order: Fabales
- Family: Fabaceae
- Subfamily: Faboideae
- Genus: Astragalus
- Species: A. siliquosus

Binomial name
- Astragalus siliquosus Boiss.

Synonyms
- Astragalus conjecturalis Schischk. Astragalus ispahanicus Boiss. Astragalus laxus Boiss. & Hausskn. Astragalus sulfureus Bunge; Astragalus tetragonocarpus Boiss. Poecilocarpus ispahanicus (Boiss.) Nevski; Tragacantha ispahanica (Boiss.) Kuntze; Tragacantha laxa (Boiss. & Hausskn.) Kuntze; Tragacantha siliquosa (Boiss.) Kuntze; Tragacantha sulfurea (Bunge) Kuntze; Tragacantha tetragonocarpa (Boiss.) Kuntze

Species of flowering plant

Astragalus siliquosus is a species of milkvetch in the family Fabaceae.
