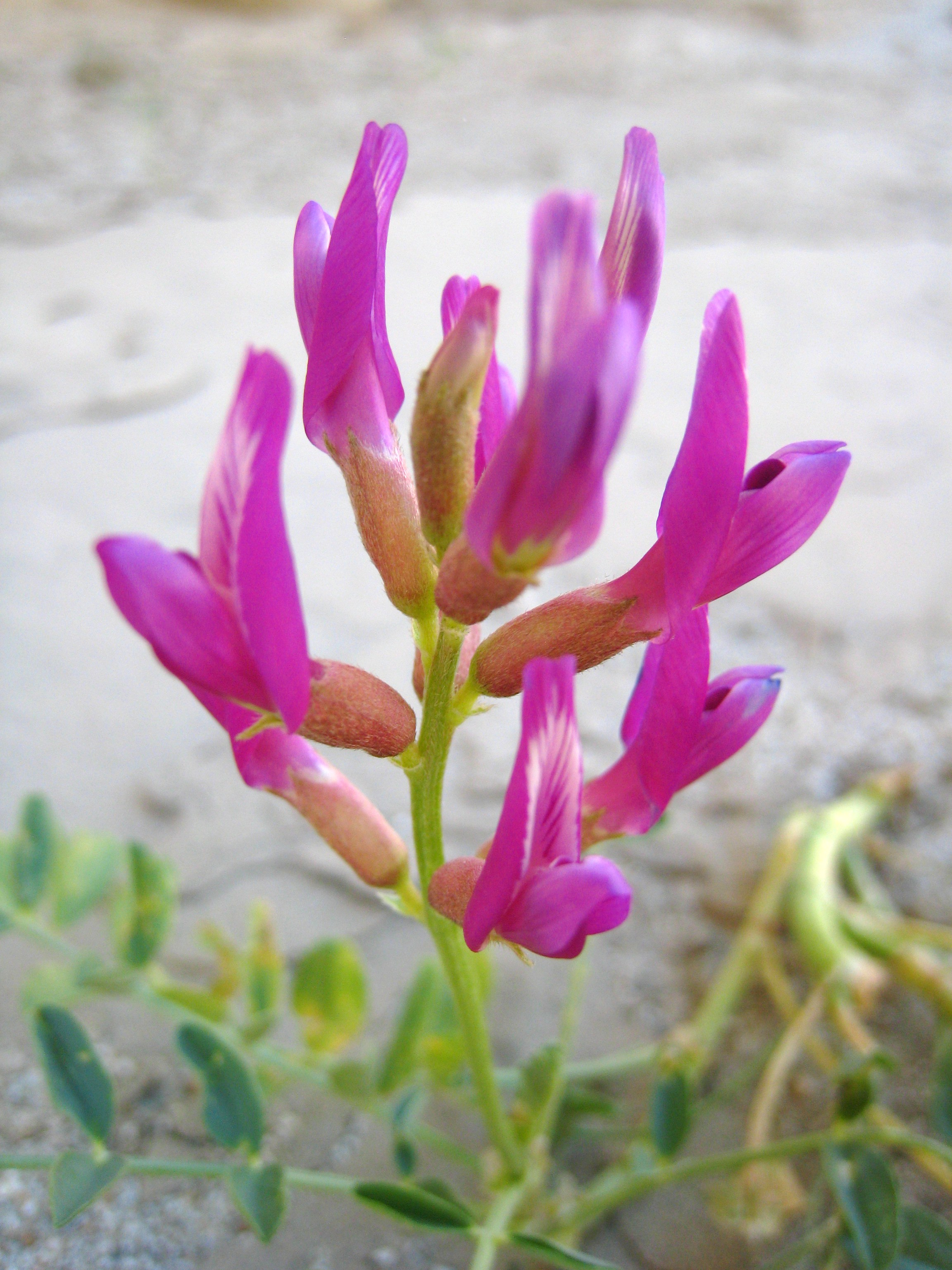
- A. lentiginosus

Scientific classification
- Kingdom: Plantae
- Clade: Tracheophytes
- Clade: Angiosperms
- Clade: Eudicots
- Clade: Rosids
- Order: Fabales
- Family: Fabaceae
- Subfamily: Faboideae
- Clade: Inverted repeat-lacking clade
- Tribe: Galegeae
- Subtribe: Astragalinae
- Genus: Astragalus; L.

Type species
- Astragalus onobrychis L.

Species
- Over 3,000 species, see list of Astragalus species

Synonyms
- Acanthophaca Nevski; Acanthyllis Pomel; Ailuroschia Steven; Alopecias Steven; Ammodytes Steven; Anaphragma Steven; Ankylobus Steven; Astenolobium Nevski; Astracantha Podlech; Astragalina Bubani; Astragaloides Adans.; Atelophragma Rydb.; Aulosema Walp.; Barnebyella Podlech; Batidophaca Rydb.; Brachyphragma Rydb.; Caryolobium Steven; Chondrocarpus Steven; Cnemidophacos Rydb.; Contortuplicata Medik.; Craccina Steven; Cryptorrhynchus Nevski; Ctenophyllum Rydb.; Cymbicarpos Steven; Cystium Steven; Cystopora Lunell; Didymopelta Regel & Schmalh.; Diholcos Rydb.; Dipelta Regel & Schmalh.; Diplotheca Hochst.; Euilus Steven; Euprepia Steven; Feidanthus Steven; Geoprumnon Rydb.; Glandula Medik.; Glaux Hill; Glottis Medik.; Glycyphylla Steven; Gynophoraria Rydb.; Halicacabus (Bunge) Nevski; Hamaria Fourr.; Hamosa Medik.; Hedyphylla Steven; Hesperastragalus A.Heller; Hesperonix Rydb.; Hippomanica Molina; Holcophacos Rydb.; Homalobus Nutt.; Hypoglottis Fourr.; Jonesiella Rydb.; Kentrophyta Nutt.; Kirchnera Opiz; Lithoon Nevski; Lonchophaca Rydb.; Macrosema Steven; Medyphylla Opiz; Microphacos Rydb.; Myctirophora Nevski; Myobroma Steven; Neodielsia Harms; Oedicephalus Nevski; Onix Medik.; Onyx Medik.; Ophiocarpus (Bunge) Ikonn.; Orophaca Britton (Note: This may actually be a valid genus.); Oxyglottis (Bunge) Nevski; Pedina Steven; Phaca L.; Phacomene Rydb.; Phacopsis Rydb.; Philammos Steven; Physondra Raf.; Picraena Steven; Pisophaca Rydb.; Podochrea Fourr.; Poecilocarpus Nevski; Proselias Steven; Psychridium Steven; Pterophacos Rydb.; Rydbergiella Fedde & Syd. ex Rydb.; Saccocalyx Steven; Sewerzowia Regel & Schmalh.; Solenotus Steven; Stella Medik.; Tium Medik.; Tragacantha Mill.; Triquetra Medik.; Xerophysa Steven; Xylophacos Rydb.

= Astragalus (plant) =

Genus of legumes

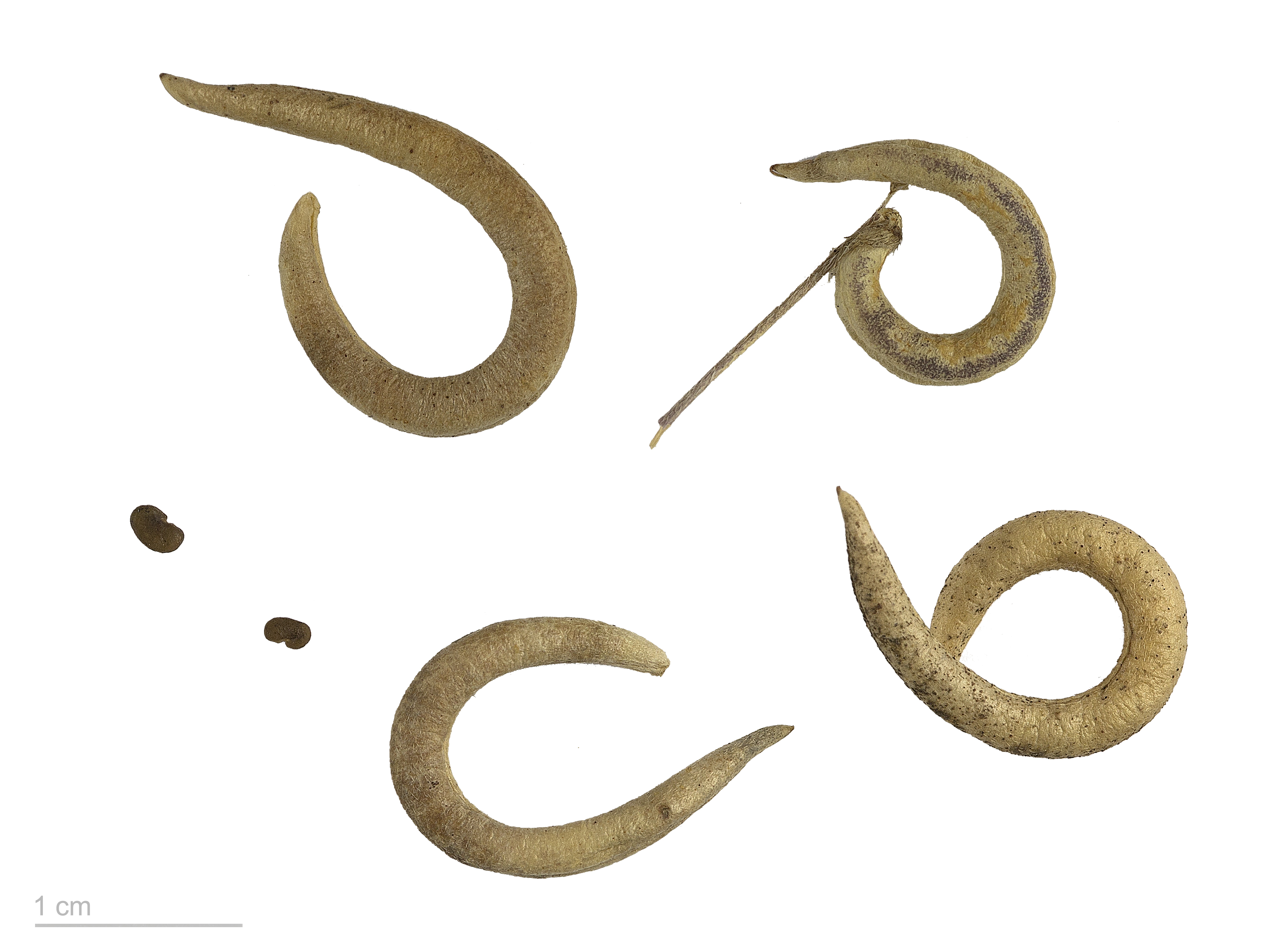
Fruits and seeds of Astragalus hamosus

Astragalus is a large genus of over 3,000 species of herbs and small shrubs, belonging to the legume family Fabaceae and the subfamily Faboideae. It is the largest genus of plants in terms of described species. The genus is native to temperate regions of the Northern Hemisphere. Common names include milkvetch (most species), locoweed (in North America, some species) and goat's-thorn (A. gummifer, A. tragacantha). Some pale-flowered vetches (Vicia spp.) are similar in appearance, but they are more vine-like than Astragalus.

== Description ==
Most species in the genus have pinnately compound leaves. There are annual and perennial species. The flowers are formed in clusters in a raceme, each flower typical of the legume family, with three types of petals: banner, wings, and keel. The calyx is tubular or bell-shaped.

== Taxonomy ==
The genus was formally described in 1753 by Carl Linnaeus in his Species Plantarum.

The name Astragalus is Greek, an old name for this group of plants which were believed to have a positive effect on goat milk production.

=== Selected species ===
- Astragalus acutirostris – sharpkeel milkvetch
- Astragalus agnicidus – Humboldt County milkvetch
- Astragalus agrestis – field milkvetch, purple milkvetch, cock's-head
- Astragalus albens – Cushenbury milkvetch
- Astragalus alpinus – alpine milkvetch, mountain locoweed
- Astragalus amphioxys – crescent milkvetch
- Astragalus ampullarioides – Shivwits milkvetch
- Astragalus andersonii – Anderson's milkvetch
- Astragalus anemophilus – San Quintin Dune milkvetch
- Astragalus anisus - Gunnison milkvetch
- Astragalus annularis
- Astragalus anserinus – Goose Creek milkvetch
- Astragalus anxius – troubled milkvetch
- Astragalus applegatei – Applegate's milkvetch
- Astragalus arrectus – Palouse milkvetch
- Astragalus asymmetricus – San Joaquin milkvetch
- Astragalus atropilosulus
- Astragalus austiniae – Austin's milkvetch
- Astragalus australis – Indian milkvetch
- Astragalus azizi – Iranian milkvetch
- Astragalus barrii – Barr's milkvetch
- Astragalus bernardinus – San Bernardino milkvetch
- Astragalus bibullatus – limestone-glade milkvetch
- Astragalus bicristatus – crested milkvetch, two-crested milkvetch
- Astragalus bidentatus
- Astragalus bisulcatus – two-groove milkvetch
- Astragalus boeticus – kaffevedel (Swedish)
- Astragalus alopecurus
- Astragalus bolanderi – Bolander's milkvetch
- Astragalus brachycalyx
- Astragalus brauntonii – Braunton's milkvetch
- Astragalus breweri – Brewer's milkvetch
- Astragalus californicus – California milkvetch
- Astragalus canadensis – Canadian milkvetch
- Astragalus casei – Case's milkvetch
- Astragalus cavanillesii
- Astragalus cicer – wild lentil, chickpea milkvetch
- Astragalus cimae – Cima milkvetch
- Astragalus claranus – Clara Hunt's milkvetch, Napa milkvetch
- Astragalus clevelandii – Cleveland's milkvetch
- Astragalus coccineus – scarlet milkvetch, scarlet locoweed
- Astragalus congdonii – Congdon's milkvetch
- Astragalus cremnophylax – Sentry milkvetch
- Astragalus crotalariae – Salton milkvetch
- Astragalus curtipes – Morro milkvetch
- Astragalus danicus – purple milkvetch
- Astragalus deanei – Deane's milkvetch, Dean's milkvetch
- Astragalus desereticus – Deseret milkvetch
- Astragalus didymocarpus – two-seeded milkvetch, dwarf white milkvetch, white dwarf locoweed
- Astragalus distortus – Ozark milkvetch
- Astragalus douglasii – Douglas's milkvetch
- Astragalus ehrenbergii
- Astragalus ertterae – Walker Pass milkvetch
- Astragalus falcatus - Russian milkvetch, sickle milkvetch, sicklepod milkvetch, silverleaf milkvetch, Russian-sickle
- Astragalus filipes – basalt milkvetch
- Astragalus funereus – Funeral Mountain milkvetch
- Astragalus gambelianus – Gambel's dwarf milkvetch, dwarf locoweed
- Astragalus gibbsii – Gibbs's milkvetch
- Astragalus gilmanii – Gilman's milkvetch
- Astragalus glycyphyllos – wild liquorice, licorice milkvetch
- Astragalus harbisonii - Punta Baja milkvetch
- Astragalus holmgreniorum – Holmgren locoweed
- Astragalus humillimus – Mancos milkvetch
- Astragalus hypoxylus – Huachuca Mountain milkvetch
- Astragalus inversus – Susanville milkvetch
- Astragalus inyoensis – Inyo milkvetch
- Astragalus iselyi – Isely's milkvetch
- Astragalus jaegerianus – Lane Mountain milkvetch
- Astragalus johannis-howellii – Long Valley milkvetch
- Astragalus kentrophyta – spiny milkvetch
- Astragalus layneae – widow's milkvetch
- Astragalus lemmonii – Lemmon's milkvetch
- Astragalus lentiformis – lens pod milkvetch
- Astragalus lentiginosus – freckled milkvetch, mottled locoweed, speckled locoweed, spotted locoweed
  - Astragalus lentiginosus var. iodanthus – Humboldt River milkvetch
  - Astragalus lentiginosus var. pseudiodanthus – Tonopah milkvetch
- Astragalus leontinus – Tyrolean milkvetch
- Astragalus leptaleus
- Astragalus leucolobus – Bear Valley woollypod, Bear Valley milkvetch
- Astragalus limnocharis
  - Astragalus limnocharis var. montii – Monti's milkvetch
- Astragalus linifolius – Grand Junction milkvetch
- Astragalus loanus – Glenwood milkvetch
- Astragalus lotoides
- Astragalus malacus – shaggy milkvetch
- Astragalus microcymbus – Skiff milkvetch
- Astragalus miguelensis – San Miguel milkvetch
- Astragalus missouriensis – Missouri milkvetch
- Astragalus mohavensis – Mojave milkvetch
- Astragalus molybdenus - Leadville milkvetch, molybdenum milkvetch.
- Astragalus mongholicus – huang qi (黄芪/黃芪 huáng qí; běi qí 北芪) Mongolian milkvetch
- Astragalus monoensis – Mono milkvetch
- Astragalus monspessulanus - Montpellier milkvetch
- Astragalus mulfordiae – Mulford's milkvetch
- Astragalus nevinii – San Clemente Island milkvetch
- Astragalus newberryi – Newberry's milkvetch
- Astragalus nitidiflorus – Tallante's milkvetch
- Astragalus nutans – Providence Mountains milkvetch
- Astragalus nuttallianus – small-flowered milkvetch
- Astragalus nuttallii – Nuttall's milkvetch
- Astragalus obscurus – arcane milkvetch
- Astragalus onobrychis
- Astragalus oocarpus – Descanso milkvetch, San Diego milkvetch
- Astragalus oophorus – egg milkvetch
- Astragalus osterhoutii – Osterhout milkvetch
- Astragalus oxyphysus – Mt. Diablo milkvetch, Diablo locoweed
- Astragalus pachypus – thickpod milkvetch
- Astragalus panamintensis – panamint milkvetch
- Astragalus pauperculus – depauperate milkvetch
- Astragalus phoenix – Ash Meadows milkvetch
- Astragalus platytropis – broadkeel milkvetch
- Astragalus pomonensis – Pomona milkvetch, Pomona locoweed
- Astragalus proimanthus – precocious milkvetch
- Astragalus proximus - Aztec milkvetch
- Astragalus pulsiferae – Ames's milkvetch
- Astragalus purshii – Pursh's milkvetch, Woollypod milkvetch, woollypod locoweed
- Astragalus pycnostachyus – Marsh milkvetch
- Astragalus rattanii – Rattan's milkvetch
- Astragalus ripleyi - Ripley's milkvetch
- Astragalus robbinsii – Robbins's milkvetch
- Astragalus sabulonum – gravel milkvetch
- Astragalus sarcocolla
- Astragalus scaphoides – bitterroot milkvetch
- Astragalus schmolliae – Schmoll milkvetch
- Astragalus shevockii – Shevock's milkvetch, Little Kern milkvetch
- Astragalus sinicus – Chinese milkvetch, renge
- Astragalus sinuatus – Whited's milkvetch
- Astragalus soxmaniorum – Soxman's milkvetch
- Astragalus subvestitus – Kern County milkvetch
- Astragalus tener – alkali milkvetch
- Astragalus tennesseensis – Tennessee milkvetch
- Astragalus tidestromii – Tidestrøm's milkvetch
- Astragalus tragacantha - Marseille milkvetch
- Astragalus traskiae – Trask's milkvetch
- Astragalus tricarinatus – triple-ribbed milkvetch
- Astragalus trichopodus – Santa Barbara milkvetch, coast locoweed, Southern California locoweed
- Astragalus tuyehensis from Iran
- Astragalus tyghensis - Tygh Valley milkvetch
- Astragalus umbraticus – Bald Mountain milkvetch
- Astragalus webberi – Webber's milkvetch
- Astragalus wetherillii - Wetherill's milkvetch
- Astragalus whitneyi – balloon-pod milkvetch
- Astragalus zionis – Zion milkvetch
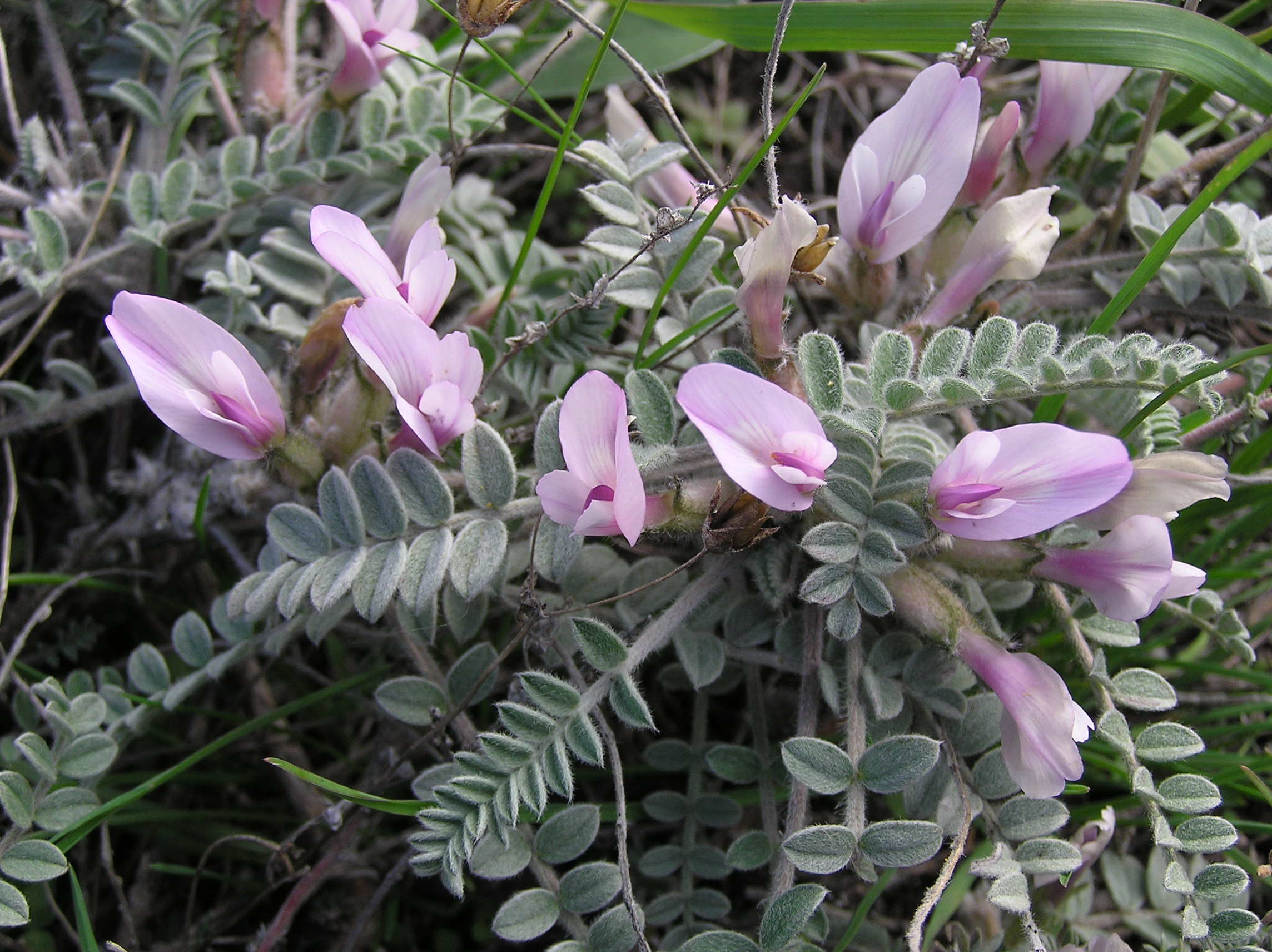
Astragalus testiculatus

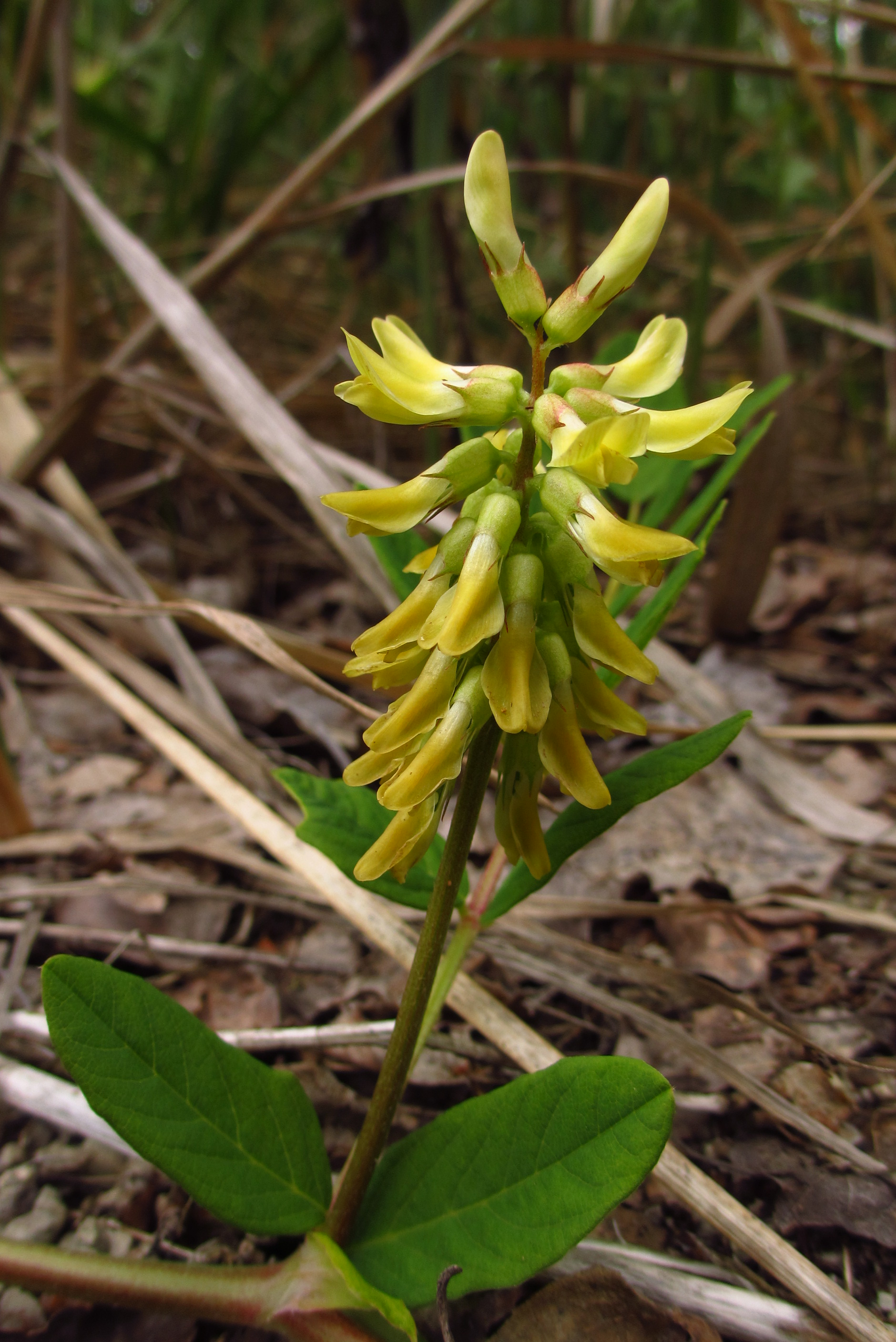
Astragalus glycyphyllos

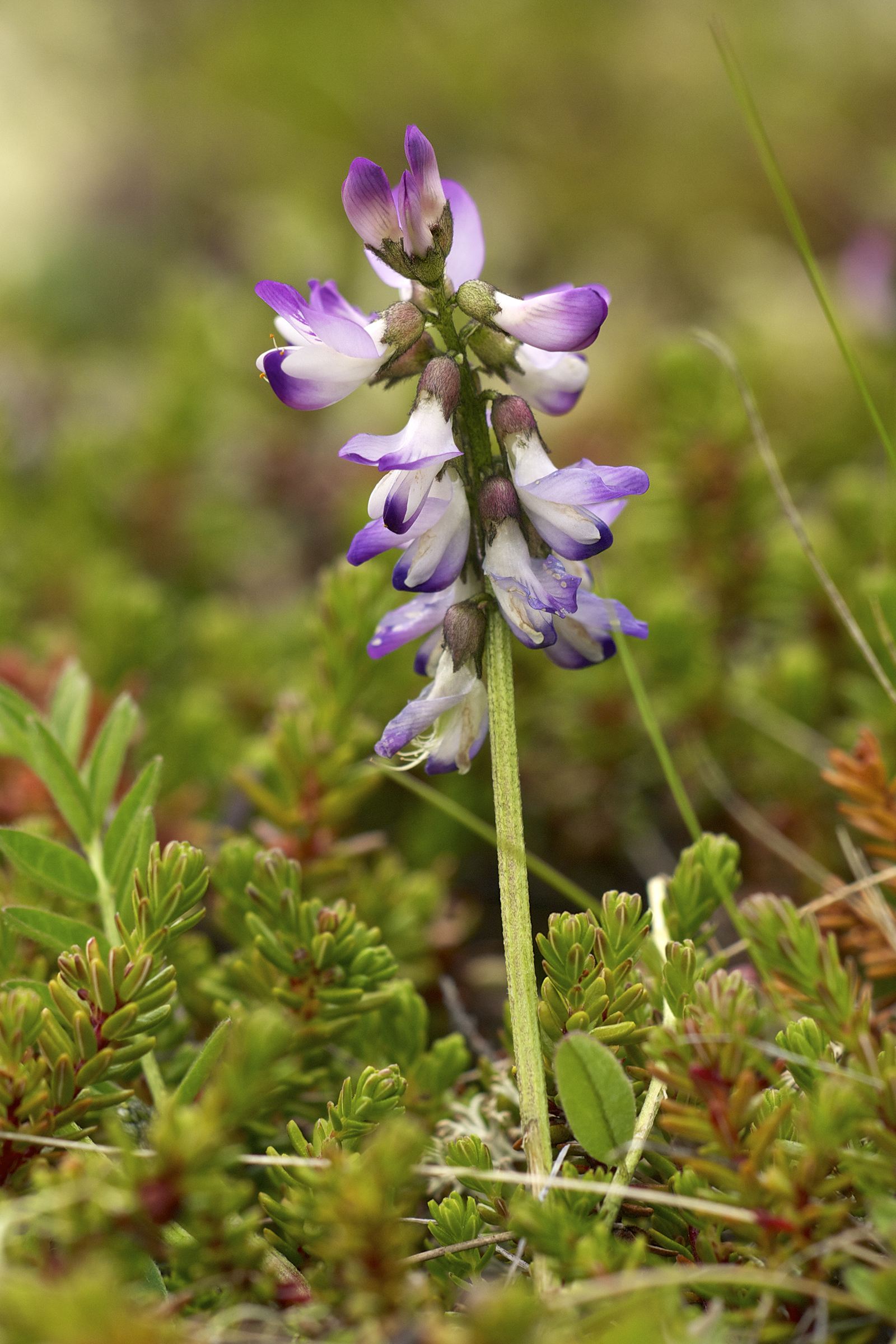
Astragalus alpinus

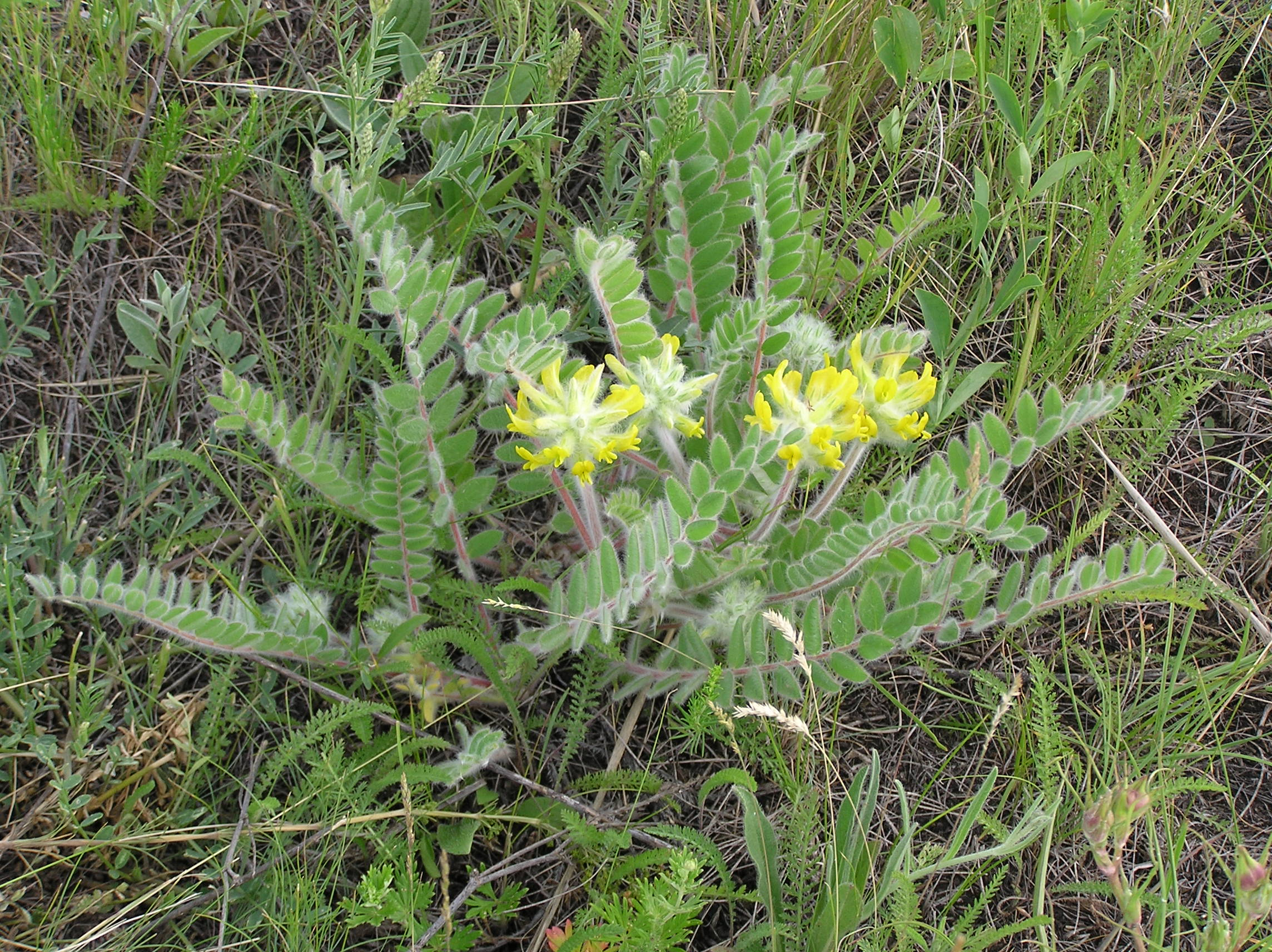
Astragalus dasyanthus

== Ecology ==
Astragalus species are used as food plants by the larvae of some Lepidoptera species including many case-bearing moths of the genus Coleophora: C. cartilaginella, C. colutella, C. euryaula, and C. onobrychiella feed exclusively on Astragalus, C. astragalella and C. gallipennella feed exclusively on the species Astragalus glycyphyllos, and C. hippodromica is limited to Astragalus gombo.

== Uses ==
=== Traditional medicine ===
Astragalus has been used in traditional Chinese medicine over centuries to treat various disorders, but there is no high-quality evidence that it is effective or safe for any medical purpose.

=== Phytochemicals and supplements ===
Extracts of astragalus root include diverse phytochemicals, such as saponins and isoflavone flavonoids, which are purported in traditional practices to increase lactation in nursing mothers. There is no valid clinical evidence to indicate such use is effective or safe for the mother or infant. Dietary supplement products containing astragalus extracts may not have been adequately tested for efficacy, safety, purity or consistency. The root extracts of astragalus may be used in soups, teas or sold in capsules.

=== Side effects and toxicology ===
Although astragalus supplements are generally well tolerated, mild gastrointestinal upset, diarrhea, and allergic reactions may occur. Because astragalus may affect regulation of blood sugar and blood pressure, it may be risky for people with blood disorders, diabetes, or hypertension to use it as a supplement. Astragalus may interact with prescribed drugs that suppress the immune system, such as medications used by people being treated for cancer or recovery from organ transplants. Some astragalus species can be toxic, such as those found in the United States containing the neurotoxin swainsonine, which causes "locoweed" poisoning in animals. Some astragalus species may contain high levels of selenium, possibly causing toxicity.

=== Ornamental use ===
Several species, including A. alpinus (bluish-purple flowers), A. hypoglottis (purple flowers), and A. lotoides, are grown as ornamental plants in gardens.
