= Astragalus curtipes =

Conservation status
- Imperiled (NatureServe)

Scientific classification
- Kingdom: Plantae
- Clade: Embryophytes
- Clade: Tracheophytes
- Clade: Angiosperms
- Clade: Eudicots
- Clade: Rosids
- Order: Fabales
- Family: Fabaceae
- Subfamily: Faboideae
- Genus: Astragalus
- Species: A. curtipes

Binomial name
- Astragalus curtipes A.Gray

Species of legume

Astragalus curtipes is a species of milkvetch known by the common name Morro milkvetch. It is endemic to the Central Coast of California, including the Morro Bay area in San Luis Obispo County.

== Description ==
Morro milkvetch is a clumpy perennial herb with a dense coat of rough, woolly hairs. The gray-green leaves are up to 16 centimeters long and are made up of fuzzy leaflets which are long and narrow in shape. The plant bears a dense inflorescence of up to 35 flowers, each about 1.5 centimeters long. The flowers are cream-colored and sometimes tipped with lilac. It’s bloom period is in May.

The fruit is an inflated legume pod 2 to 3 centimeters long which dries to a thin, papery texture. Its single chamber contains many seeds.

It is closely related to Astragalus nuttallii, with the only major difference being the elevation of the pod.
