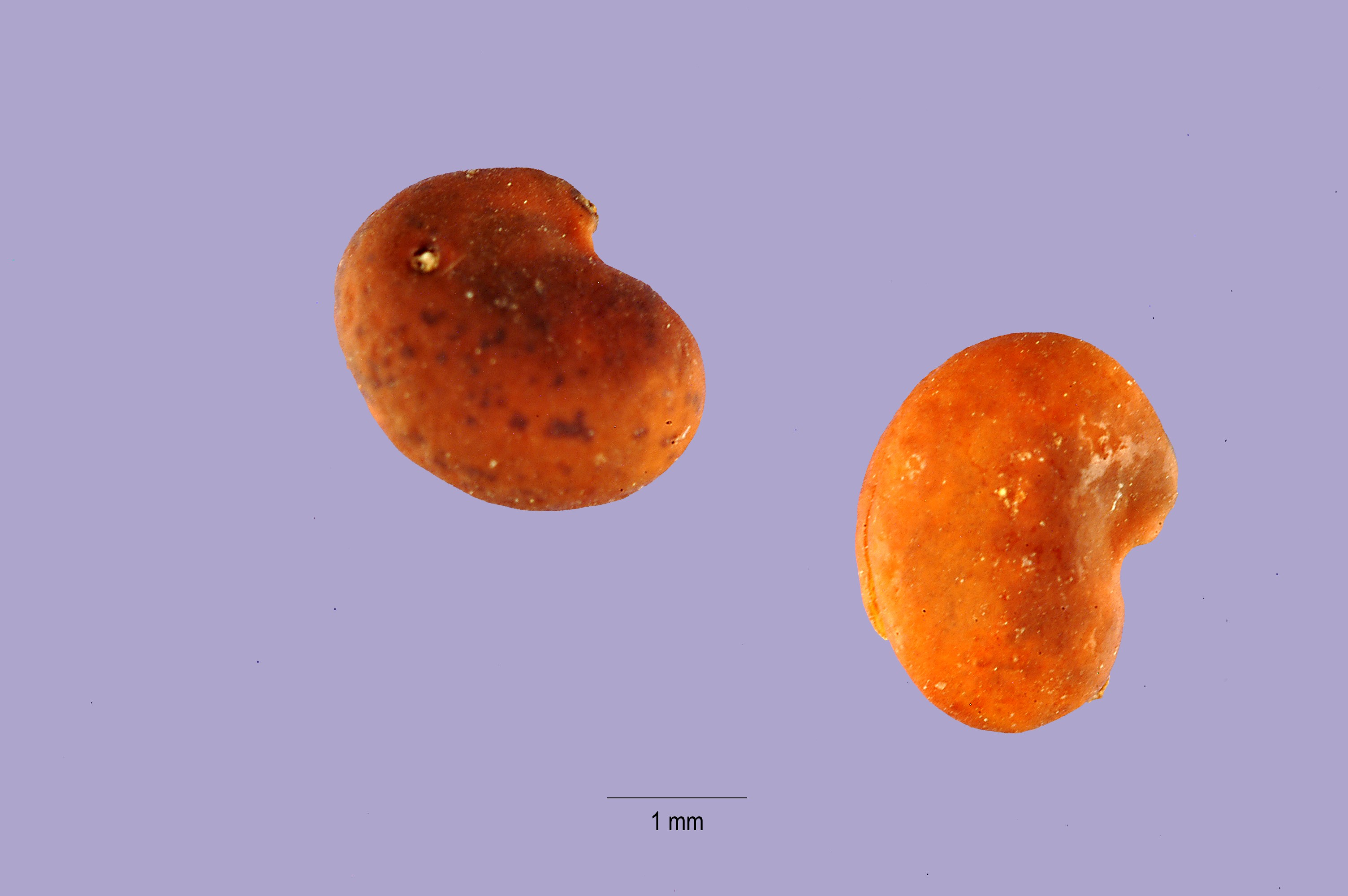
- Seeds

Conservation status
- Apparently Secure (NatureServe)

Scientific classification
- Kingdom: Plantae
- Clade: Tracheophytes
- Clade: Angiosperms
- Clade: Eudicots
- Clade: Rosids
- Order: Fabales
- Family: Fabaceae
- Subfamily: Faboideae
- Genus: Astragalus
- Species: A. bolanderi

Binomial name
- Astragalus bolanderi A.Gray, 1868

= Astragalus bolanderi =

Bolander's milkvetch

Species of legume

Astragalus bolanderi is a species of milkvetch known by the common name Bolander's milkvetch. It is native to western Nevada and parts of the Sierra Nevada in California. It grows in dry, rocky habitat on mountain and plateau.

== Description ==
Astragalus bolanderi is a perennial herb producing erect, drooping, or creeping stems up to 40 centimeters long. The stems are mostly naked, with a sparse coat of long, wavy hairs and a few leaves on the upper parts. The leaves are up to 16 centimeters long and are made up of very widely spaced oval to nearly lance-shaped leaflets each up to 2 centimeters long. The leaflet has a hard midrib that ends in a point at the tip.

It blooms between the months of June and September. It is most commonly found in the elevations of between 6,000 and 8,000 feet. It is most commonly found in the months of July and August.

The inflorescence is a dense cluster of 7 to 18 pealike flowers. Each flower is between 1 and 2 centimeters long and is purple-tinted white. The fruit is an inflated, curved legume pod up to 3 centimeters long. It dries to a thick papery texture.
