= Astragalus pauperculus =

Scientific classification
- Kingdom: Plantae
- Clade: Tracheophytes
- Clade: Angiosperms
- Clade: Eudicots
- Clade: Rosids
- Order: Fabales
- Family: Fabaceae
- Subfamily: Faboideae
- Genus: Astragalus
- Species: A. pauperculus

Binomial name
- Astragalus pauperculus Greene

Species of legume

Astragalus pauperculus is an uncommon species of milkvetch known by the common name depauperate milkvetch. It is endemic to northern California, where it is known from the northern Sacramento Valley and the lowest reaches of the Cascade foothills adjacent. It grows in chaparral and vernally wet grassland habitat. This is a very small annual milkvetch which grows in a delicate mat with stems no longer than 10 cm (3.9 in). The leaves are a few centimeters long and are made up of small widely spaced leaflets. The inflorescence bears two to seven flowers which are purple, sometimes with paler colored edges on their petals. Each flower is generally less than 1 cm (0.39 in) long. The fruit is a crescent-shaped legume pod between 1 and 2 cm (0.39 and 0.79 in) long.
