= Astragalus obscurus =

Scientific classification
- Kingdom: Plantae
- Clade: Tracheophytes
- Clade: Angiosperms
- Clade: Eudicots
- Clade: Rosids
- Order: Fabales
- Family: Fabaceae
- Subfamily: Faboideae
- Genus: Astragalus
- Species: A. obscurus

Binomial name
- Astragalus obscurus S.Wats.

Species of legume

Astragalus obscurus is a species of milkvetch known by the common name arcane milkvetch. It is native to the northwestern United States in Idaho and Oregon and northern parts of Nevada and California. It is a plant of rocky areas in mountains and Great Basin plateaus. This is a small, mat-forming perennial herb with tufts of hairy stems approaching a maximum length of 15 centimeters. The leaves are up to 10 centimeters long and made up of thick oval-shaped leaflets. The inflorescence is a dense cluster of 5 to 15 off-white to faintly lilac-tinted flowers, each less than a centimeter long. The fruit is a narrow, leathery legume pod held upright in the infructescence. It may reach 2.5 centimeters in length and usually has two chambers inside.
