= Astragalus pachypus =

Scientific classification
- Kingdom: Plantae
- Clade: Tracheophytes
- Clade: Angiosperms
- Clade: Eudicots
- Clade: Rosids
- Order: Fabales
- Family: Fabaceae
- Subfamily: Faboideae
- Genus: Astragalus
- Species: A. pachypus

Binomial name
- Astragalus pachypus Greene

Species of legume

Astragalus pachypus is a species of milkvetch known by the common name thickpod milkvetch. It is endemic to California, where it is known from many types of open habitat across the southern half of the state. This is a robust perennial herb forming stands of tough, wiry stems up to 80 centimeters tall. Leaves are up to about 16 centimeters long and are made up of many narrow leaflets. The plant flowers in inflorescences of 4 to 28 cream-colored flowers. The fruit is a sharp-beaked legume pod up to about 3 centimeters long which dries to a leathery, mostly hairless texture. There are two varieties of this species. The rarer, Jaeger's bush milkvetch (var. jaegeri), is known mostly from western Riverside County.
