= Astragalus nevinii =

Scientific classification
- Kingdom: Plantae
- Clade: Tracheophytes
- Clade: Angiosperms
- Clade: Eudicots
- Clade: Rosids
- Order: Fabales
- Family: Fabaceae
- Subfamily: Faboideae
- Genus: Astragalus
- Species: A. nevinii

Binomial name
- Astragalus nevinii A.Gray

Species of legume

Astragalus nevinii is a rare species of milkvetch known by the common name San Clemente Island milkvetch. It is endemic to San Clemente Island, one of the Channel Islands of California. This is perennial herb growing upright 10 to 30 centimetres (4 to 12 in) tall. It is coated in woolly, tangled hairs. Its leaves are up to 8 centimetres (3 1/6 in) long and are made up of many oblong leaflets. The inflorescence is a dense cluster of up to 30 cream-colored flowers, each around 1 centimetre (5/12 in) in length. The fruit is a hanging legume pod up to 2 centimetres (3/4 in) long which is papery in texture and mostly hairless.
