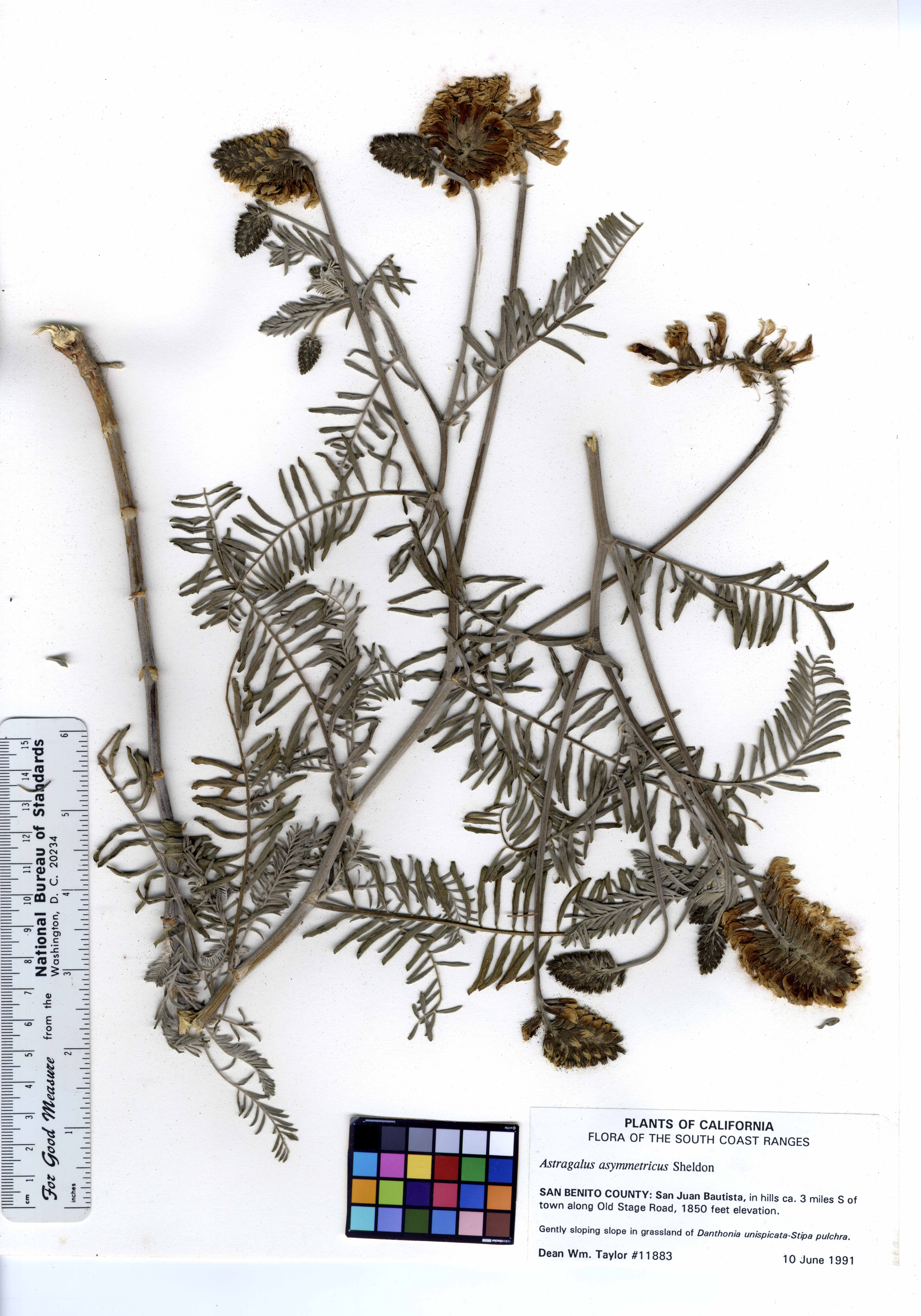

Conservation status
- Apparently Secure (NatureServe)

Scientific classification
- Kingdom: Plantae
- Clade: Tracheophytes
- Clade: Angiosperms
- Clade: Eudicots
- Clade: Rosids
- Order: Fabales
- Family: Fabaceae
- Subfamily: Faboideae
- Genus: Astragalus
- Species: A. asymmetricus

Binomial name
- Astragalus asymmetricus E.Sheld.

= Astragalus asymmetricus =

San Joaquin milkvetch

Species of legume

Astragalus asymmetricus is a species of milkvetch known by the common name San Joaquin milkvetch. It is endemic to California, where it grows in grassy and disturbed areas in the Central Valley and nearby parts of the Central Coast Ranges and San Francisco Bay Area.

== Description ==
Astragalus asymmetricus is a sturdy perennial herb growing a thick, erect stem to heights between 50 and 120 cm (20 and 47 in). It is coated in long hairs. The leaves are up to 20 cm (7.9 in) long and are made up of many pairs of leaflike leaflets, each up to 2.5 cm (0.98 in) long and varying in shape from linear to oval. The inflorescence contains 15 to 45 cream-colored pealike flowers 1 to 2 cm (0.39 to 0.79 in) long. The flower color is cream.

The fruit is a slightly inflated hairy legume pod up to 4 cm (1.6 in) long which hangs in bunches from the dried inflorescence.

Its bloom period is from April to July. It has major toxicity, which probably comes from eating it.
