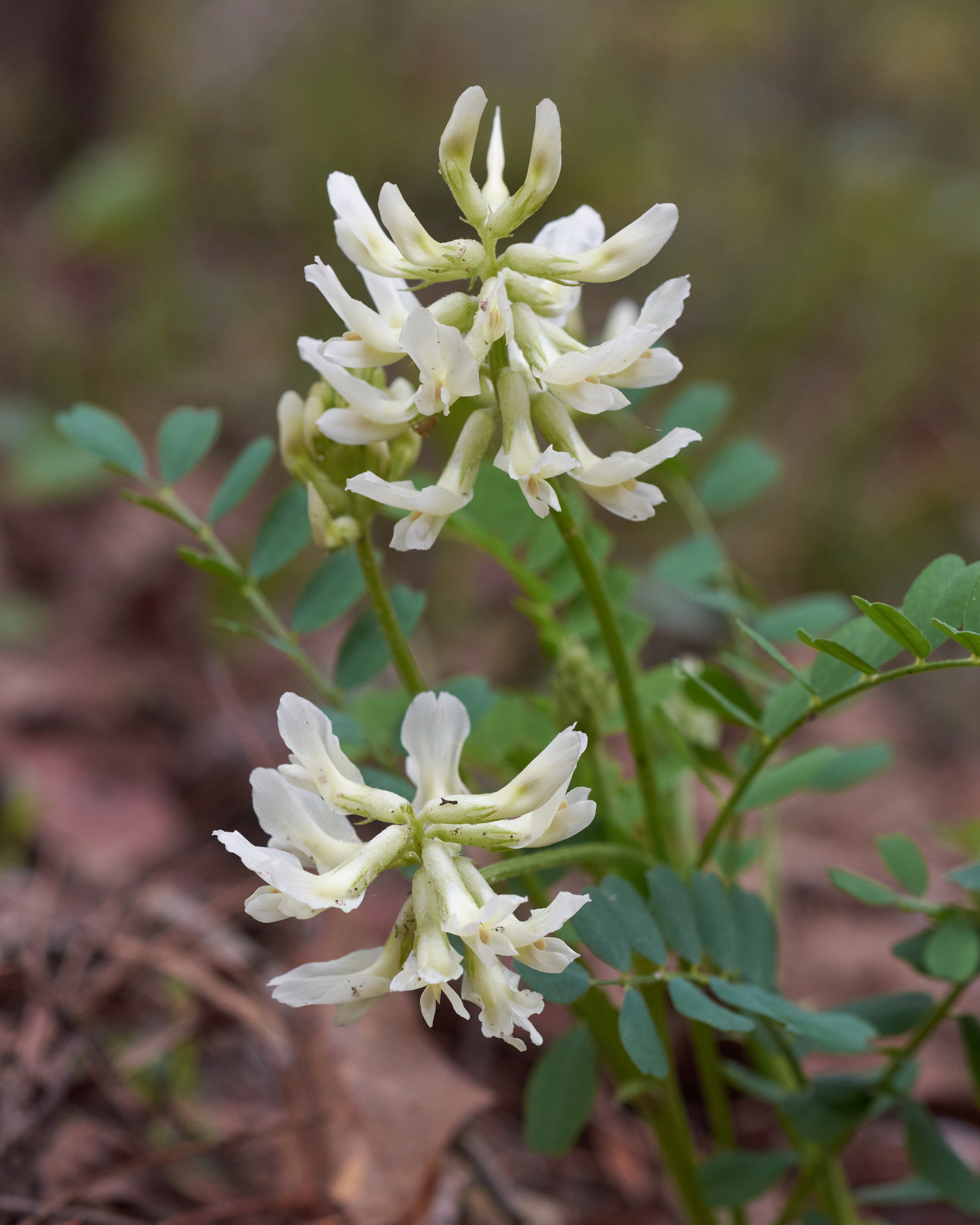

Conservation status
- Vulnerable (NatureServe)

Scientific classification
- Kingdom: Plantae
- Clade: Tracheophytes
- Clade: Angiosperms
- Clade: Eudicots
- Clade: Rosids
- Order: Fabales
- Family: Fabaceae
- Subfamily: Faboideae
- Genus: Astragalus
- Species: A. soxmaniorum

Binomial name
- Astragalus soxmaniorum Lundell

= Astragalus soxmaniorum =

Species of legume

Astragalus soxmaniorum is a species of flowering plant in the pea family, Fabaceae. It is sometimes referred to by the common name Soxman's milkvetch, that is native to Texas, Louisiana and Arkansas in the United States of America.
