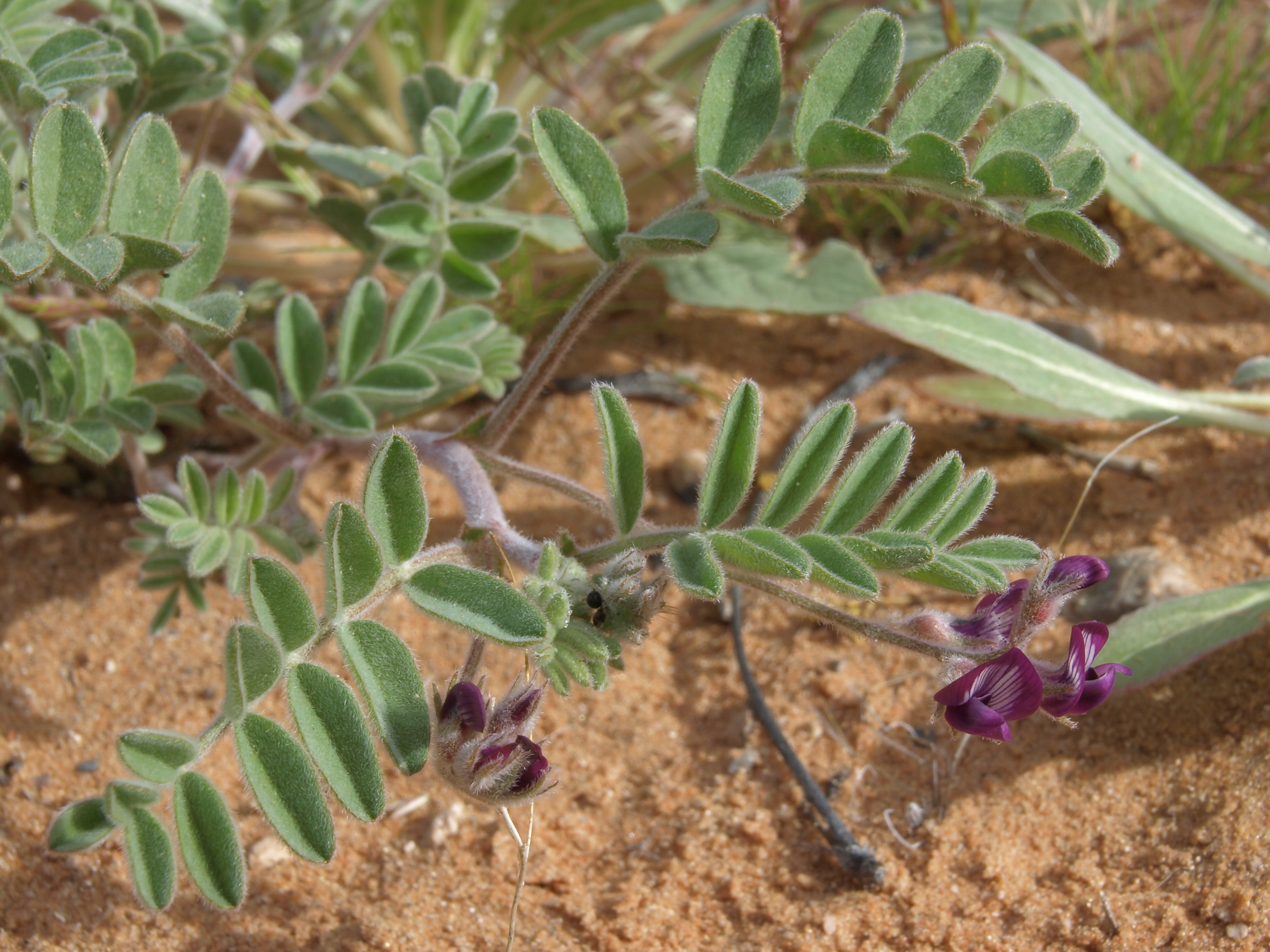

Scientific classification
- Kingdom: Plantae
- Clade: Tracheophytes
- Clade: Angiosperms
- Clade: Eudicots
- Clade: Rosids
- Order: Fabales
- Family: Fabaceae
- Subfamily: Faboideae
- Genus: Astragalus
- Species: A. sabulonum

Binomial name
- Astragalus sabulonum A.Gray

= Astragalus sabulonum =

Species of legume

Astragalus sabulonum is a species of milkvetch known by the common name gravel milkvetch. It is native to the Southwestern United States and California, from desert to mountain habitats.

This is a hairy annual herb with stems up to about 26 centimeters long. Leaves are a few centimeters long and are made up of several hairy oval-shaped leaflets. The inflorescence is an open array of 2 to 7 off-white to pale lilac flowers each less than a centimeter in length.

The fruit is a curved, leathery, hairy legume pod up to 2 centimeters long.
