= Astragalus cavanillesii =

Conservation status
- Critically Endangered (IUCN 3.1)

Scientific classification
- Kingdom: Plantae
- Clade: Embryophytes
- Clade: Tracheophytes
- Clade: Spermatophytes
- Clade: Angiosperms
- Clade: Eudicots
- Clade: Rosids
- Order: Fabales
- Family: Fabaceae
- Subfamily: Faboideae
- Genus: Astragalus
- Species: A. cavanillesii

Binomial name
- Astragalus cavanillesii Podlech

Species of legume

Astragalus cavanillesii is a species of legume in the family Fabaceae. It is found only in Spain. Its natural habitat is Mediterranean-type shrubby vegetation. It is threatened by habitat loss.

It is found in an area of Southern Spain near Murcia. It is most commonly found in the months of May and June.
