= Astragalus monoensis =

Conservation status
- Imperiled (NatureServe)

Scientific classification
- Kingdom: Plantae
- Clade: Tracheophytes
- Clade: Angiosperms
- Clade: Eudicots
- Clade: Rosids
- Order: Fabales
- Family: Fabaceae
- Subfamily: Faboideae
- Genus: Astragalus
- Species: A. monoensis

Binomial name
- Astragalus monoensis Barneby

Species of legume

Astragalus monoensis is a rare species of milkvetch known by the common name Mono milkvetch. It is endemic to the open pumice plains of central Mono County, California.

== Description ==
Astragalus monoensis is a rhizomatous perennial herb with stems growing partly underground and emerging to lie flat on the sand. The leaves are up to 3 cm (1.2 in) long and are made up of several tiny oval-shaped leaflets. Stem and leaflets are hairy.

The inflorescence is a cluster of 6 to 12 very pale pink to yellowish flowers, each around a centimeter long. The fruit is a legume pod, curved to bent in shape and drying to a papery, hairy texture. It is 1.5 to 2 cm (0.59 to 0.79 in) in length and contains around 18 to 20 seeds in its two chambers.
