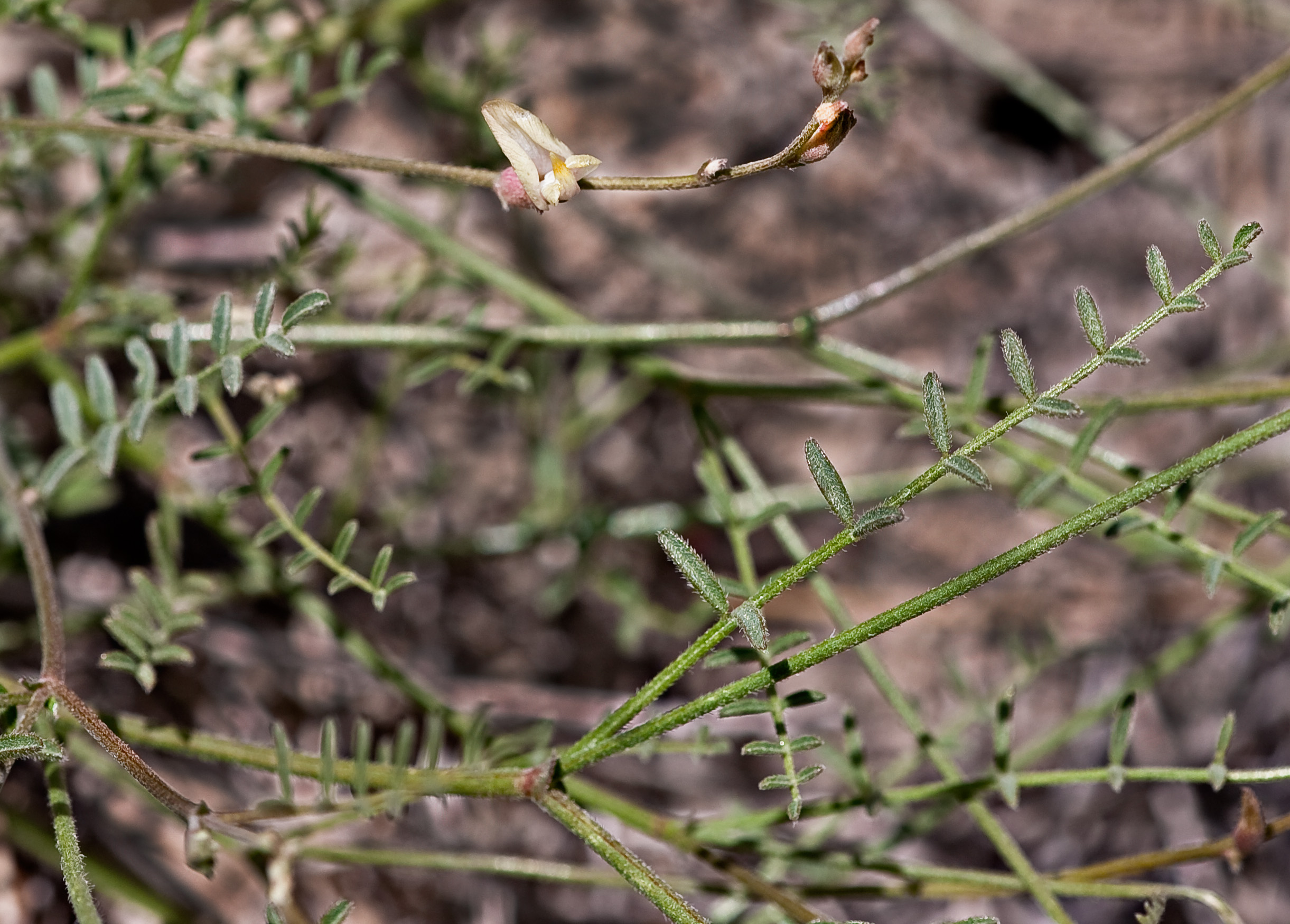

Conservation status
- Imperiled (NatureServe)

Scientific classification
- Kingdom: Plantae
- Clade: Tracheophytes
- Clade: Angiosperms
- Clade: Eudicots
- Clade: Rosids
- Order: Fabales
- Family: Fabaceae
- Subfamily: Faboideae
- Genus: Astragalus
- Species: A. shevockii

Binomial name
- Astragalus shevockii Barneby

= Astragalus shevockii =

Species of legume

Astragalus shevockii is a rare species of milkvetch known by the common names Little Kern milkvetch and Shevock's milkvetch. It is endemic to Tulare County, California, where it grows in the High Sierra, generally on granite-based soils in Jeffrey pine forests.

== Description ==
Astragalus shevockii is a slender perennial herb producing thin, hard, hairy stems up to 35 centimeters long. The leaves are a few centimeters in length and are made up of several widely spaced oval-shaped leaflets. The inflorescence is an open cluster of up to 13 cream-colored flowers each about a centimeter long.

The fruit is a hairy, papery legume pod 1 to 3 centimeters long.
