= Astragalus tidestromii =

Scientific classification
- Kingdom: Plantae
- Clade: Tracheophytes
- Clade: Angiosperms
- Clade: Eudicots
- Clade: Rosids
- Order: Fabales
- Family: Fabaceae
- Subfamily: Faboideae
- Genus: Astragalus
- Species: A. tidestromii

Binomial name
- Astragalus tidestromii (Rydb.) Clokey

Species of legume

Astragalus tidestromii is a species of milkvetch known by the common name Tidestrøm's milkvetch. It is native to the Mojave Desert of California and Nevada, where it grows in limestone gravel soils. The plant is named for the botanist Ivar Frederick Tidestrøm.

== Description ==
This is a tuft or clump forming perennial herb with absent or very short stems. The leaves are up to 15 centimeters long and made up of oval-shaped to rounded leaflets. The herbage is coated in a shaggy layer of hairs. The inflorescence is an open cluster of flowers of light to deep purple, tipped with darker purple.

The fruit is a flattened legume pod which has a drastic curved shape, sometimes curving into a complete ring. It is leathery and hairy in texture and may reach 5.5 centimeters in length.
