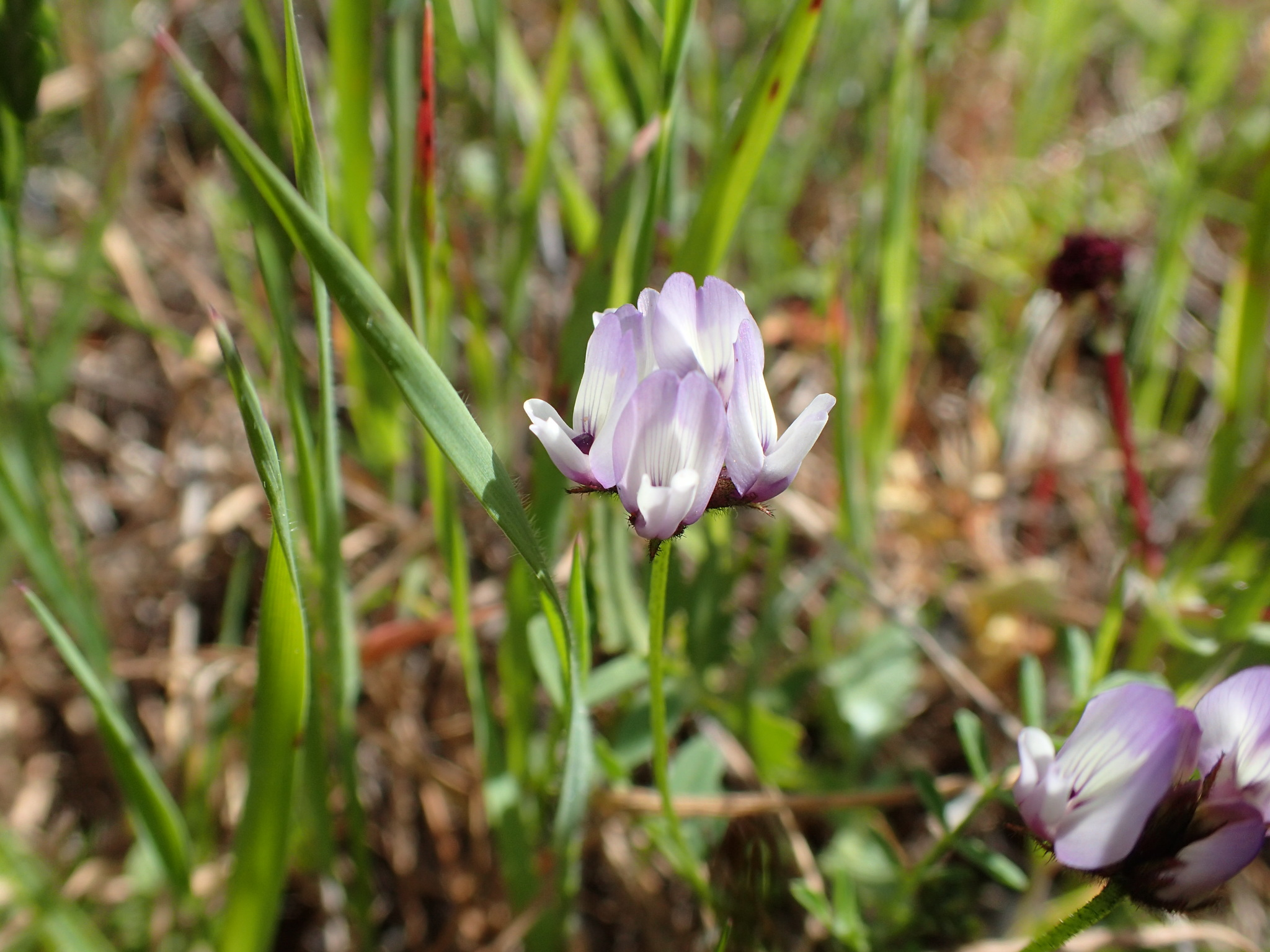

Conservation status
- Vulnerable (NatureServe)

Scientific classification
- Kingdom: Plantae
- Clade: Embryophytes
- Clade: Tracheophytes
- Clade: Angiosperms
- Clade: Eudicots
- Clade: Rosids
- Order: Fabales
- Family: Fabaceae
- Subfamily: Faboideae
- Genus: Astragalus
- Species: A. breweri

Binomial name
- Astragalus breweri A.Gray

= Astragalus breweri =

Brewer's milkvetch

Species of legume

Astragalus breweri is a species of milkvetch known by the common name Brewer's milkvetch. It is endemic to northern California, where it is found in several counties surrounding the north edge of the San Francisco Bay Area. It grows in open habitat in the North Coast Ranges, sometimes on serpentine soils.

== Description ==
This is a small annual herb producing stems usually only a few centimeters long. The small leaves are made up of widely spaced leaflets with notched tips. The inflorescence arises on a rough-haired peduncle and holds up to ten pealike flowers. Each flower is about a centimeter long and colored white, yellow, or pale lavender, sometimes with light purple streaks. The fruit is an oval-shaped legume pod up to a centimeter long armed with a sharp beak. It contains 2 to 6 beanlike seeds. The bloom period is between April and June.

== Distribution and habitat ==
It is commonly found in or near volcanic slopes and serpentine outcrops. Plentiful locally in the interior valleys and foothills of the Coast Ranges in southeastern Mendocino, Lake, Napa, and Sonoma Counties, southwest to the Pacific slope of Mt. Tamalpais, and Marin County, California. It is found in grassy flats, meadows moist in spring, and open slopes in the chaparral belt below 2000 feet.
