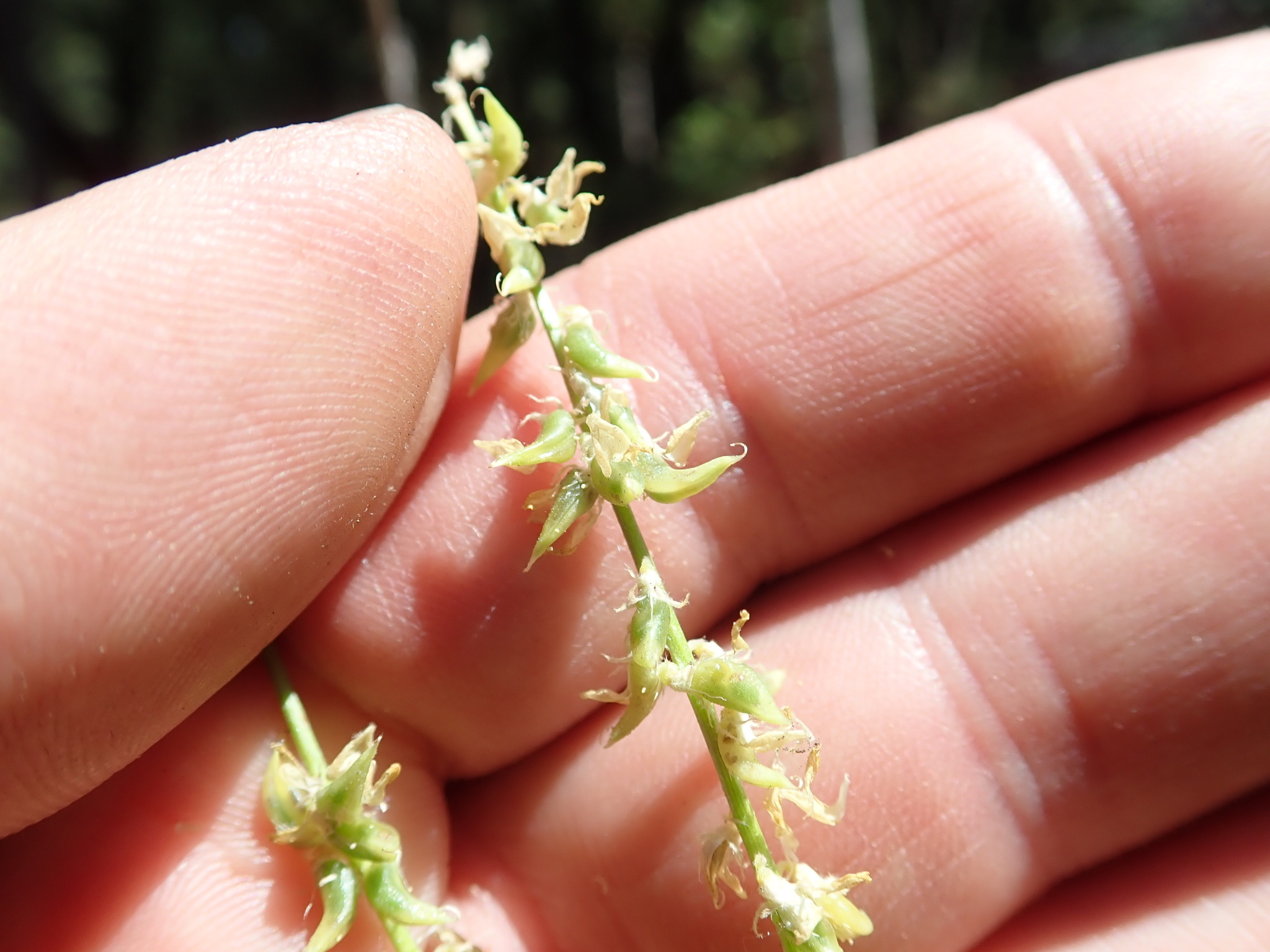

Conservation status
- Vulnerable (NatureServe)

Scientific classification
- Kingdom: Plantae
- Clade: Embryophytes
- Clade: Tracheophytes
- Clade: Angiosperms
- Clade: Eudicots
- Clade: Rosids
- Order: Fabales
- Family: Fabaceae
- Subfamily: Faboideae
- Genus: Astragalus
- Species: A. clevelandii

Binomial name
- Astragalus clevelandii Greene

= Astragalus clevelandii =

Cleveland's milkvetch

Species of legume

Astragalus clevelandii is an uncommon species of milkvetch known by the common name Cleveland's milkvetch. It is endemic to northern California, where it grows in moist areas of the North Coast Ranges. It is a member of the serpentine soils flora.

== Description ==
Astragalus clevelandii is a bushy perennial herb growing up to a meter tall. Its plentiful leaves are up to 14 centimeters long and are made up of many oval-shaped leaflets. The plant is mostly hairless, but the leaves may have rough hairs on the undersides. The large inflorescence is a spike of up to 100 small pealike flowers, each under a centimeter long. They are white or off-white in color. It's bloom period is between the months of June-September.

The fruit is a legume pod less than a centimeter long which dries to a thick papery texture.
