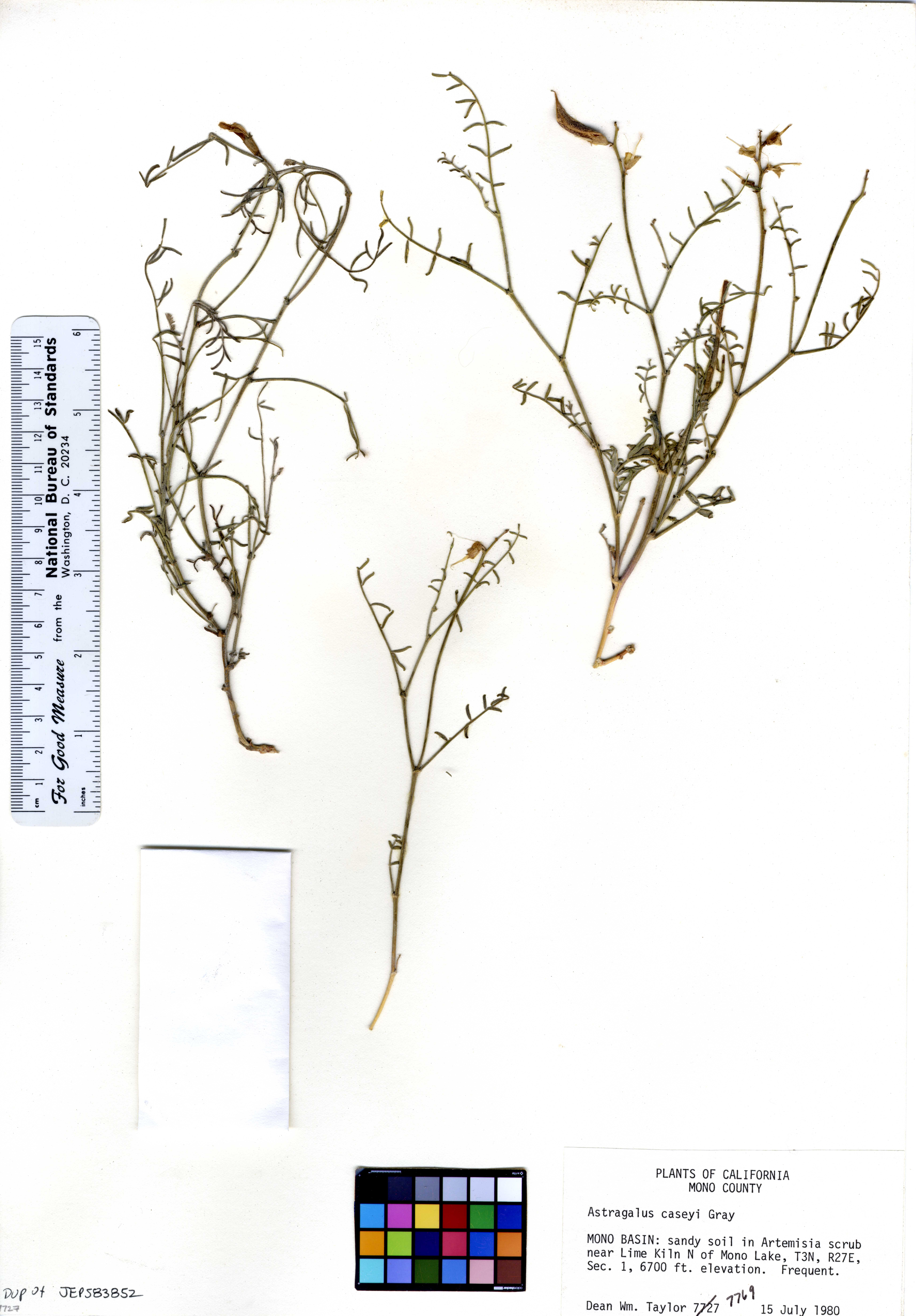

Scientific classification
- Kingdom: Plantae
- Clade: Tracheophytes
- Clade: Angiosperms
- Clade: Eudicots
- Clade: Rosids
- Order: Fabales
- Family: Fabaceae
- Subfamily: Faboideae
- Genus: Astragalus
- Species: A. casei

Binomial name
- Astragalus casei A.Gray ex W.H.Brewer & S.Wats.

Synonyms
- Tragacantha casei (Asa Gray) Xylophacos casei (Asa Gray)

= Astragalus casei =

Case's milkvetch

Species of legume

Astragalus casei is a species of milkvetch known by the common name Case's milkvetch. It is native to the Mojave Desert and its sky island woodlands of eastern California and western Nevada.

== Description ==
Astragalus casei is a wiry, branching perennial herb forming an open clump of jagged stems up to 40 cm (16 in) long. Leaves are up to 10 cm (3.9 in) long and made up of thin, narrow, lance-shaped leaflets. The plant bears an inflorescence of up to 25 pink, lilac, or white flowers. Each flower is between 1 and 2 cm (0.39 and 0.79 in) long. The flowers bloom in the months of April, May and June. The petals colors are usually pink-purple with white tips, and sometimes just white.

The fruit is a hanging legume pod 2 to 5 cm (0.79 to 1.97 in) long. It is narrow, slightly hairy, and tipped with a sharp beak. It is pulpy when new and it dries to a tough texture.
