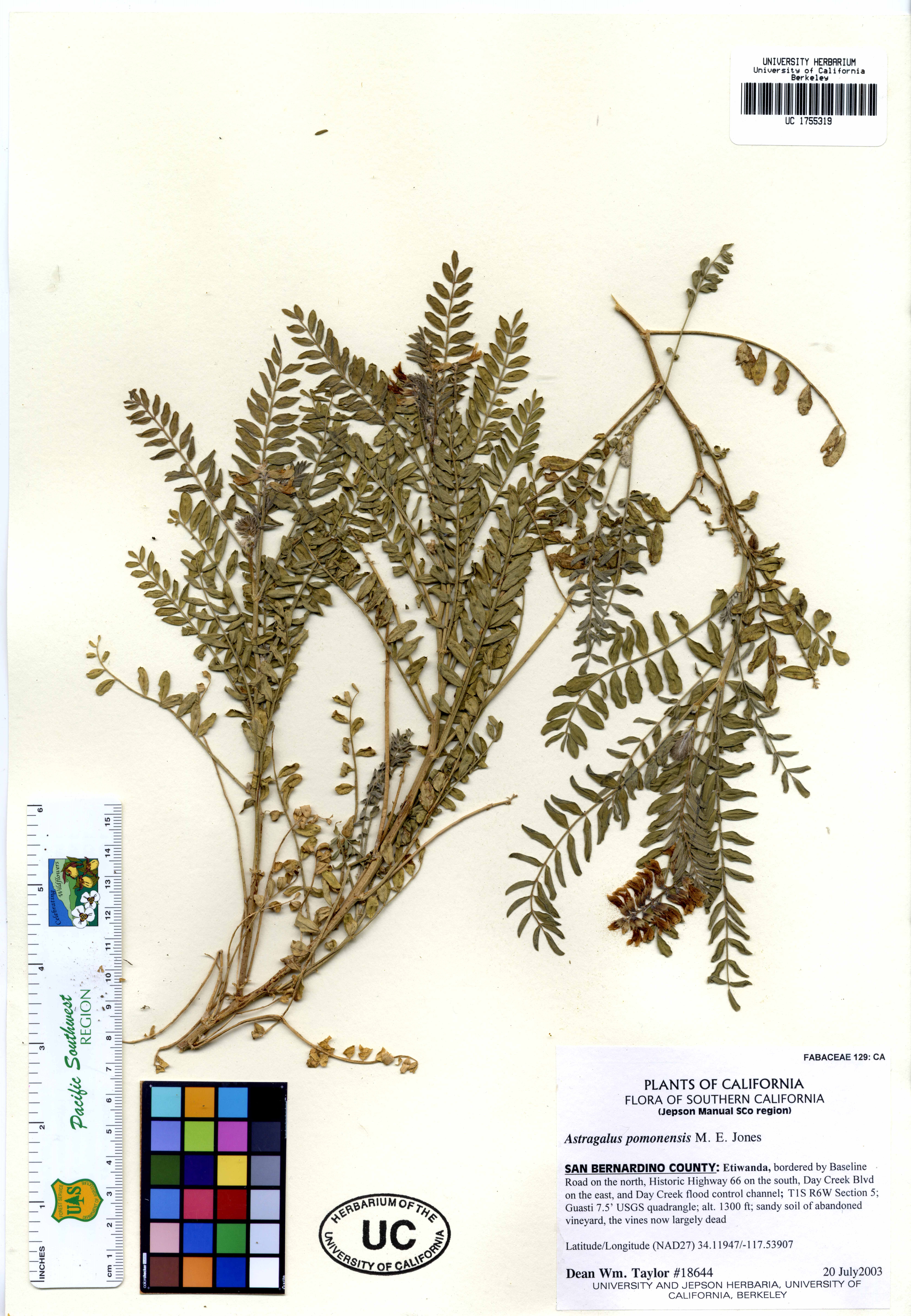

Scientific classification
- Kingdom: Plantae
- Clade: Tracheophytes
- Clade: Angiosperms
- Clade: Eudicots
- Clade: Rosids
- Order: Fabales
- Family: Fabaceae
- Subfamily: Faboideae
- Genus: Astragalus
- Species: A. pomonensis

Binomial name
- Astragalus pomonensis M.E.Jones

= Astragalus pomonensis =

Species of legume

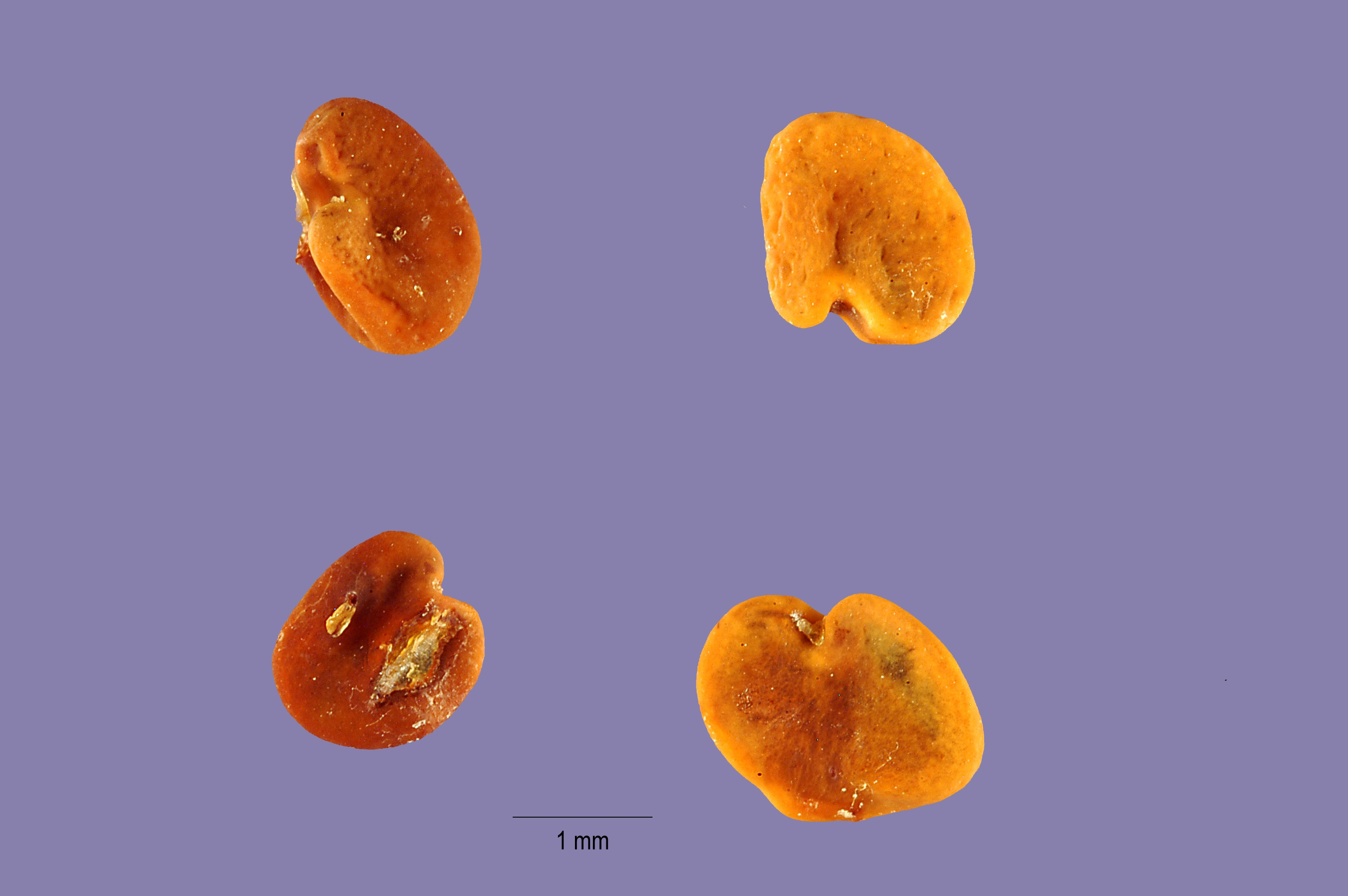
Seeds

Astragalus pomonensis is a species of milkvetch known by the common name Pomona milkvetch. It is native to Baja California and southern California, where it can be found in a number of coastal habitats, including the California Coast Ranges. This is a bushy perennial herb forming a clump of thick, hollow stems up to about 80 centimeters tall. Leaves are up to 20 centimeters long and are made up of many oval-shaped leaflets each up to 3 centimeters in length. The inflorescence is a large array of up to 45 cream-colored flowers. Each flower is between one and two centimeters long. The fruit is a bladdery legume pod which dries to a thin, almost transparent papery texture. It may exceed 4 centimeters in length and generally drops off the plant when dry.
