= Astragalus mohavensis =

Scientific classification
- Kingdom: Plantae
- Clade: Tracheophytes
- Clade: Angiosperms
- Clade: Eudicots
- Clade: Rosids
- Order: Fabales
- Family: Fabaceae
- Subfamily: Faboideae
- Genus: Astragalus
- Species: A. mohavensis

Binomial name
- Astragalus mohavensis S.Wats.

Species of legume

Astragalus mohavensis is a species of milkvetch known by the common name Mojave milkvetch. It is native to the Mojave Desert of California and Nevada.

== Description ==
This is an annual or perennial herb forming clumpy gray-green patches of upright stems up to 35 cm (14 in) long. Leaves are up to about 12 cm (4.7 in) long and are made up of many oval-shaped to rounded leaflets. The inflorescence bears up to 15 pinkish-purple flowers, each around 1 cm (0.39 in) in length. The fruit is a hairy, leathery legume pod up to about 3 cm (1.2 in) long.

=== Varieties ===
There are two varieties of this plant. The rare variety A. m. var. hemigyrus, the halfring milkvetch, can be found only in Nevada, having been extirpated from the California side of the desert; it can be distinguished from the more common variety by its curved or coiled seed pods.
