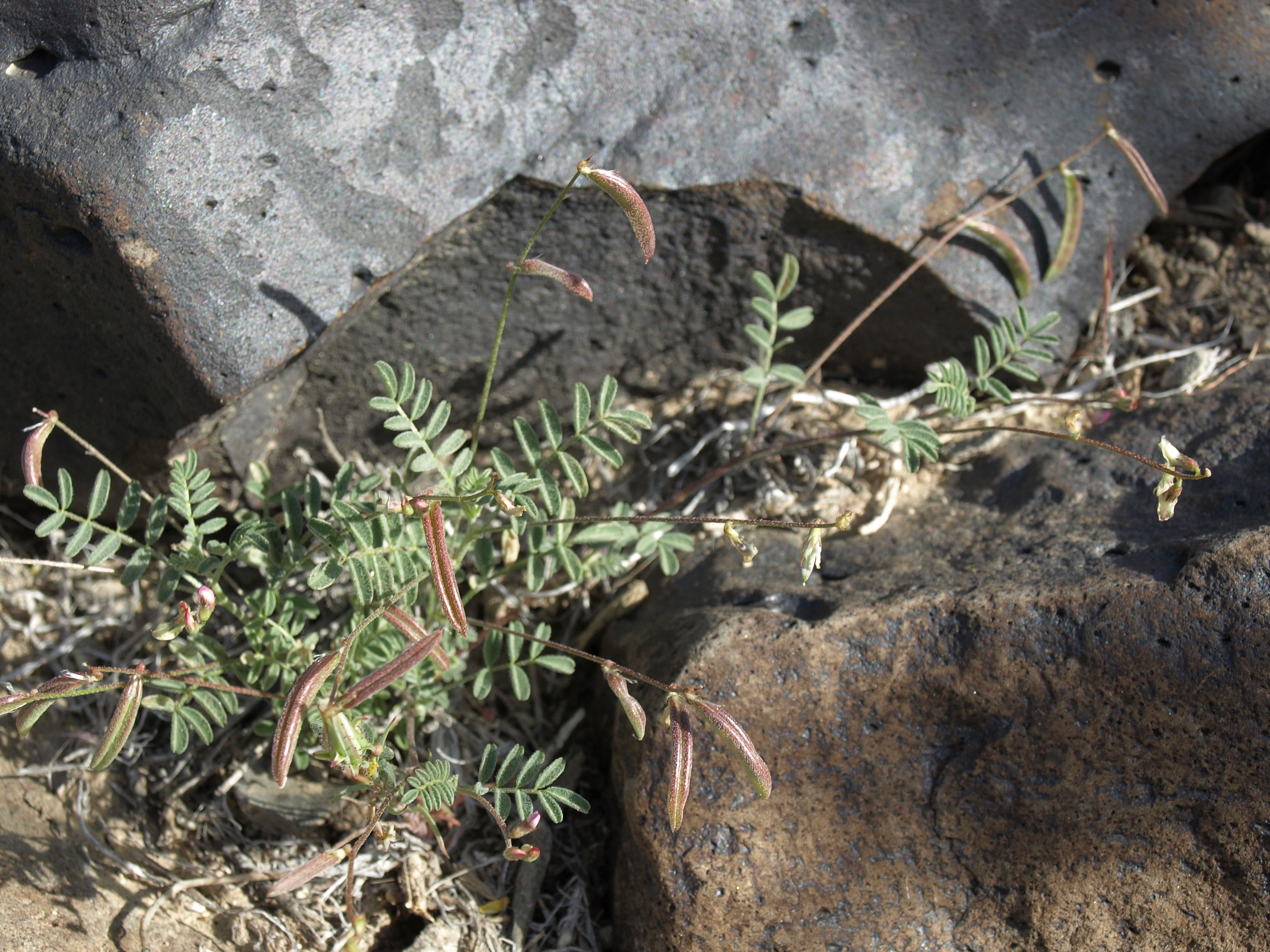

Scientific classification
- Kingdom: Plantae
- Clade: Embryophytes
- Clade: Tracheophytes
- Clade: Spermatophytes
- Clade: Angiosperms
- Clade: Eudicots
- Clade: Rosids
- Order: Fabales
- Family: Fabaceae
- Subfamily: Faboideae
- Genus: Astragalus
- Species: A. acutirostris

Binomial name
- Astragalus acutirostris S.Watson

= Astragalus acutirostris =

Sharpkeel milkvetch

Species of legume

Astragalus acutirostris is a species of milkvetch known by the common name sharpkeel milkvetch. It is native to the Mojave Desert and surroundings of California, Nevada, and Arizona, where it grows in dry, sandy, gravelly areas.

== Description ==
Astragalus acutirostris is an annual legume growing a hairy reddish stem no more than 30 centimeters long along the ground or slightly upright. The small leaves are made up of several pairs of small oblong leaflets, each less than a centimeter long and often with notched tips. The inflorescence contains one to six white or pinkish-tinted pealike flowers, each with a banner that curves back.

The fruit is a slightly curved, narrow legume pod 1 to 3 centimeters long. The pod is thin-walled and coated sparsely in white hairs like the rest of the plant.
