= Astragalus miguelensis =

Conservation status
- Apparently Secure (NatureServe)

Scientific classification
- Kingdom: Plantae
- Clade: Tracheophytes
- Clade: Angiosperms
- Clade: Eudicots
- Clade: Rosids
- Order: Fabales
- Family: Fabaceae
- Subfamily: Faboideae
- Genus: Astragalus
- Species: A. miguelensis

Binomial name
- Astragalus miguelensis Greene

Species of legume

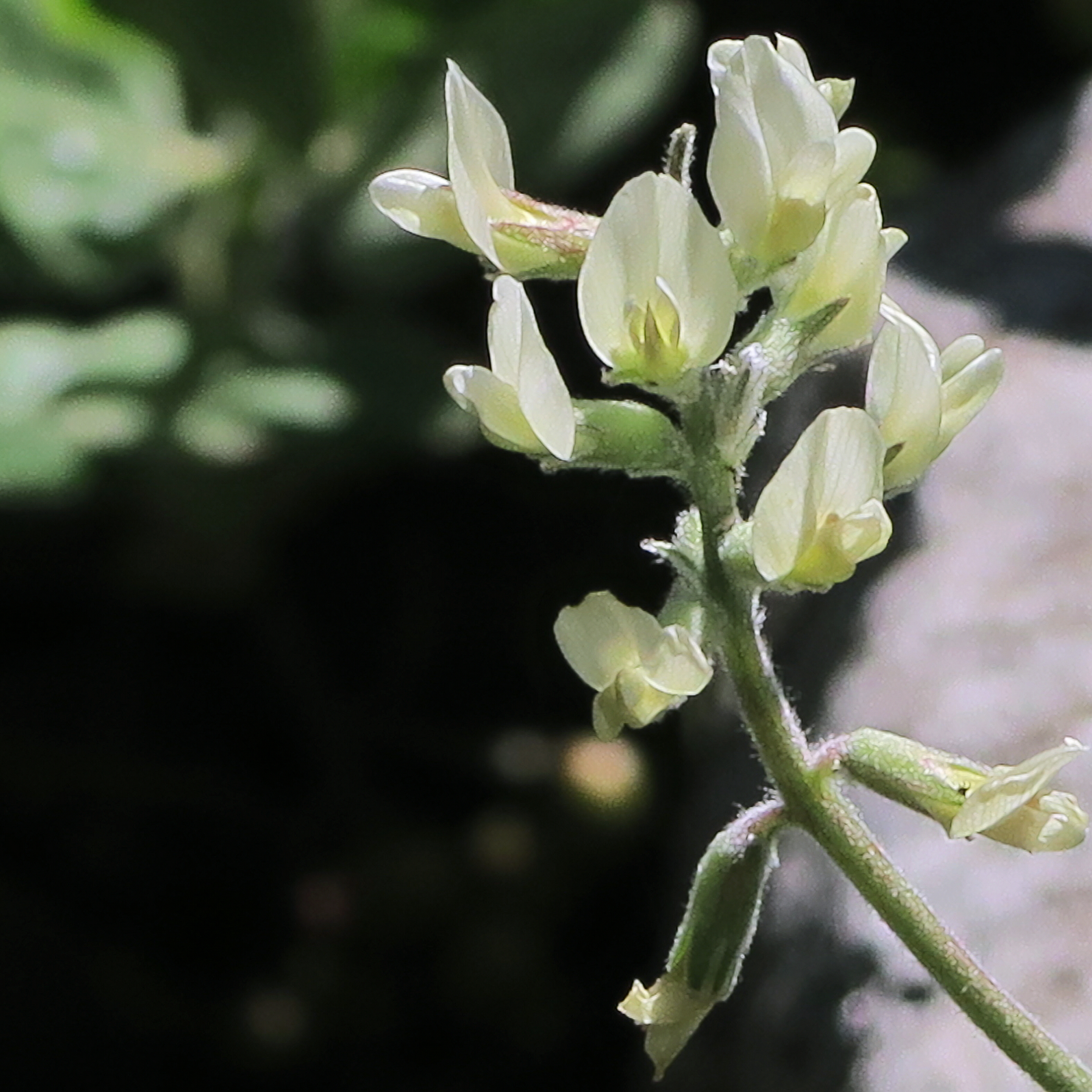
Astragalus miguelensis—San Miguel island milk vetch.

Astragalus miguelensis is a rare species of milkvetch known by the common name San Miguel milkvetch. It is endemic to five of the eight Channel Islands of California.

== Description ==
This is a mat-forming perennial herb growing in wide, thick patches on rocky seaside bluffs and beaches. The abundant leaves are up to 12 centimeters long and are made up of many woolly oval-shaped leaflets. The inflorescence bears up to 30 white to yellowish flowers, each between one and two centimeters long. The fruit is an inflated legume pod drying to a papery texture. It is up to about 2.5 centimeters in length.
