= Astragalus tuyehensis =

Scientific classification
- Kingdom: Plantae
- Clade: Tracheophytes
- Clade: Angiosperms
- Clade: Eudicots
- Clade: Rosids
- Order: Fabales
- Family: Fabaceae
- Subfamily: Faboideae
- Genus: Astragalus
- Species: A. tuyehensis

Binomial name
- Astragalus tuyehensis Ghahr., Maassoumi & F. Ghahre.

Species of legume

Astragalus tuyehensis is a plant species native to Iran. Type locale is in Semnan Province, 35 km north of Damghan City, near Tuyeh at an elevation of approximately 2000 m (6700 feet).

Astragalus tuyehensis is a perennial herb up to 13 cm tall. Much of the shoot is covered with a dense white coat of woolly hairs. Leaves are odd-pinnately compound, with 2 or 3 pairs of elliptical leaflets, each leaflet up to 9 mm long, densely woolly on both sides. Inflorescence is oval to spherical, with 3-10 flowers. Flowers yellow to yellowish-brown. Fruit up to 10 mm long with a beak at the end.
