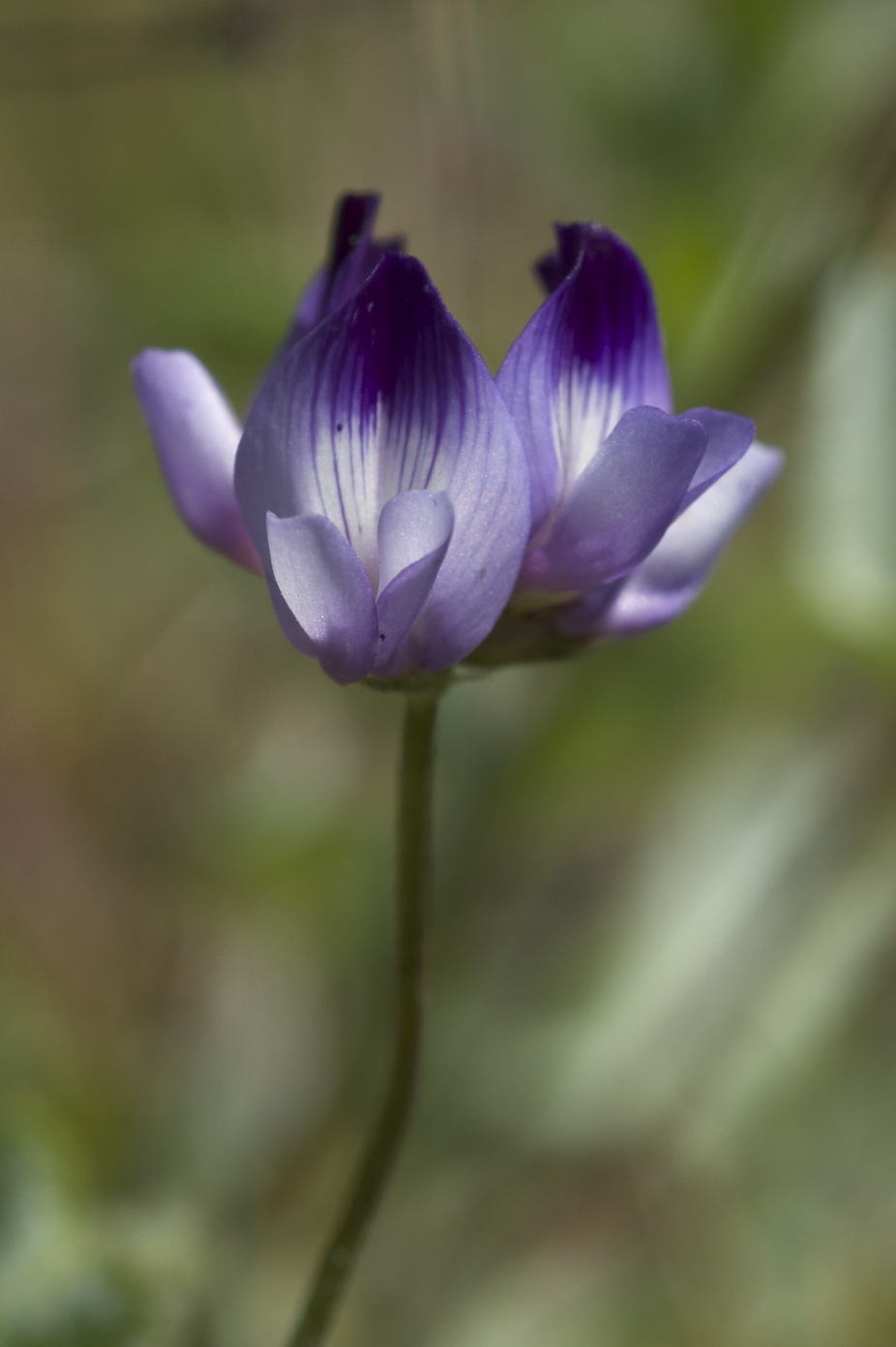

Scientific classification
- Kingdom: Plantae
- Clade: Tracheophytes
- Clade: Angiosperms
- Clade: Eudicots
- Clade: Rosids
- Order: Fabales
- Family: Fabaceae
- Subfamily: Faboideae
- Genus: Astragalus
- Species: A. rattanii

Binomial name
- Astragalus rattanii A.Gray

= Astragalus rattanii =

Species of legume

Astragalus rattanii is a species of milkvetch known by the common name Rattan's milkvetch. It is endemic to northern California, where it grows in the North Coast Ranges.

== Description ==
This is a hairy annual herb with thin stems growing up to 30 cm (12 in) long. The leaves are a few centimeters long and made up of a few oval-shaped leaflets. The inflorescence is a head of two to ten flowers which are pinkish purple in color with paler tips. This fruit is a cylindrical legume pod up to 6 cm (2.4 in) long with a sharp, pointed beak at the end.
