= Astragalus annularis =

Scientific classification
- Kingdom: Plantae
- Clade: Tracheophytes
- Clade: Angiosperms
- Clade: Eudicots
- Clade: Rosids
- Order: Fabales
- Family: Fabaceae
- Subfamily: Faboideae
- Genus: Astragalus
- Species: A. annularis

Binomial name
- Astragalus annularis Forssk.

Synonyms
- Astragalus maculatus Lam.; Astragalus trimorphus Viv.; Astragalus subulatus Desf.

Species of legume

Astragalus annularis is a species of flowering plant in the legume family, known in Arabic by the common name hurbuth (حُربُث). It is indigenous between Algeria and Iran.
