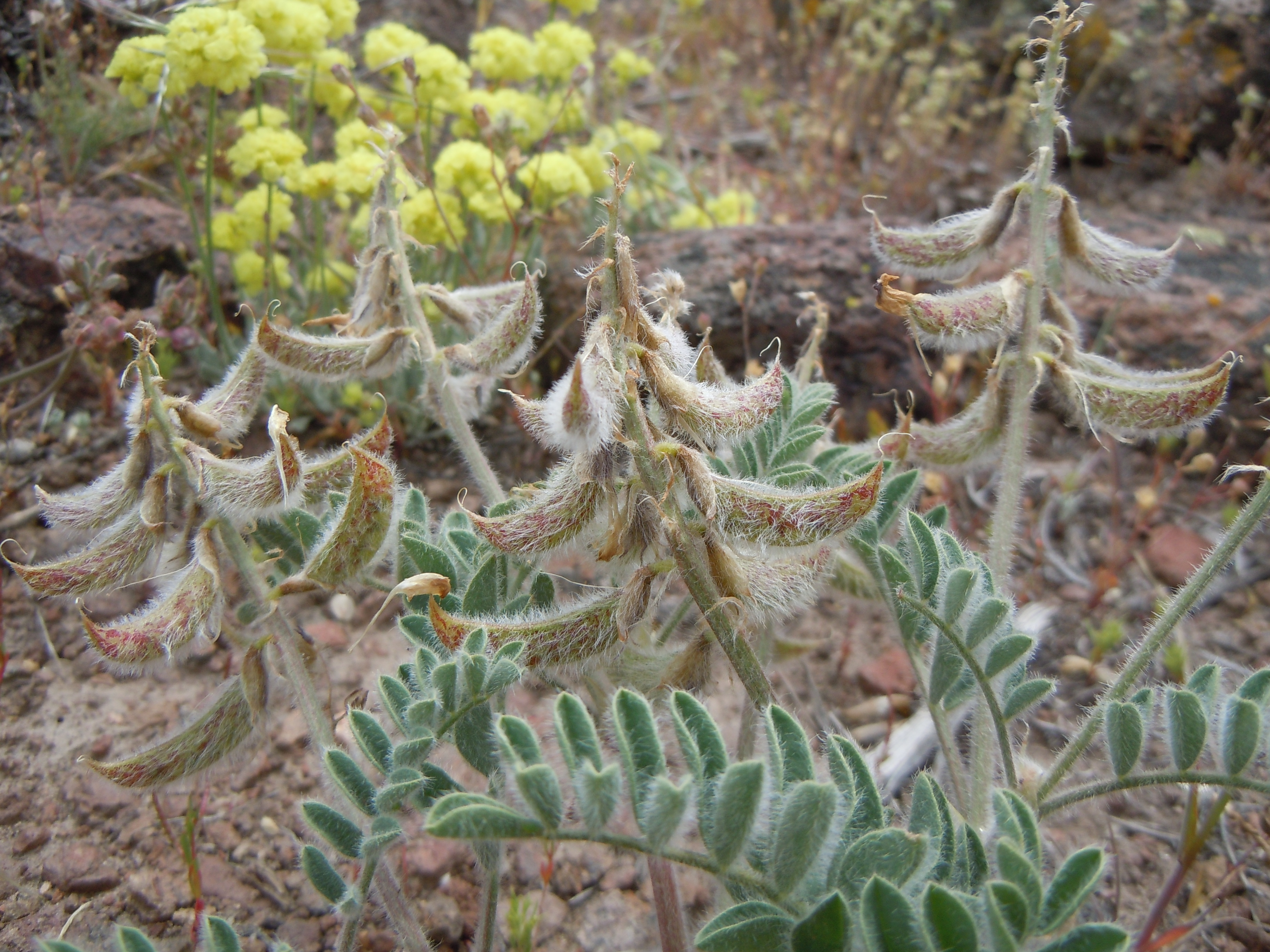

Scientific classification
- Kingdom: Plantae
- Clade: Tracheophytes
- Clade: Angiosperms
- Clade: Eudicots
- Clade: Rosids
- Order: Fabales
- Family: Fabaceae
- Subfamily: Faboideae
- Genus: Astragalus
- Species: A. malacus

Binomial name
- Astragalus malacus A.Gray

= Astragalus malacus =

Species of legume

Astragalus malacus is a species of milkvetch known by the common name shaggy milkvetch. It is native to the Great Basin in the western United States.

== Description ==
Astragalus malacus is perennial herb growing upright to a maximum height near 40 centimeters. Its leaves are up to 15 centimeters long and are made up of many oval-shaped leaflets. The inflorescence bears up to 35 magenta flowers, each up to 2 centimeters long. Stem, leaves, inflorescence, and sepals are coated in long, white hairs. The fruit is a densely hairy, papery legume pod up to 4 centimeters in length.
