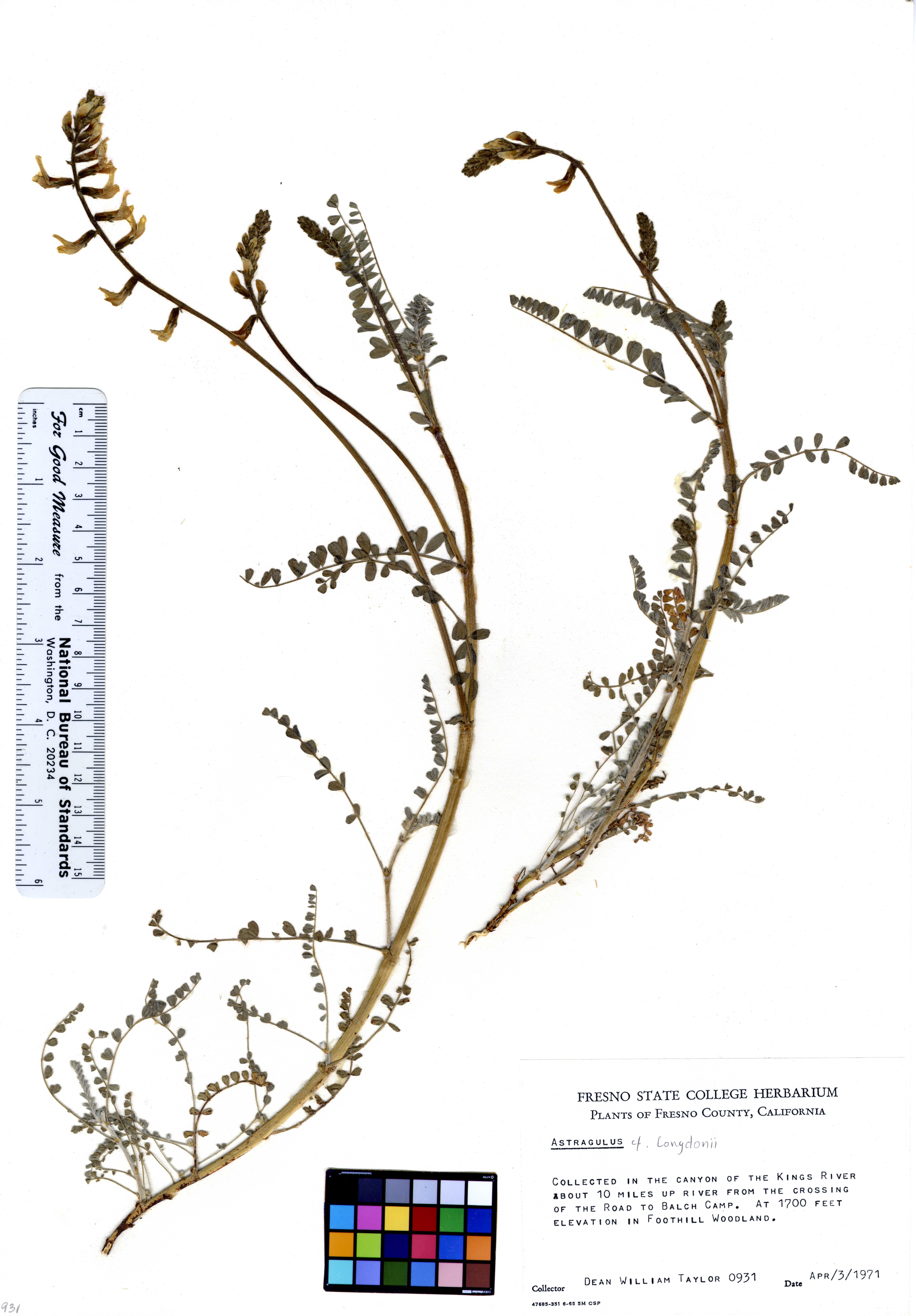

Conservation status
- Apparently Secure (NatureServe)

Scientific classification
- Kingdom: Plantae
- Clade: Tracheophytes
- Clade: Angiosperms
- Clade: Eudicots
- Clade: Rosids
- Order: Fabales
- Family: Fabaceae
- Subfamily: Faboideae
- Genus: Astragalus
- Species: A. congdonii

Binomial name
- Astragalus congdonii S.Wats.

= Astragalus congdonii =

Congdon's milkvetch

Species of legume

Astragalus congdonii is a species of milkvetch known by the common name Congdon's milkvetch. It is a perennial herb that is endemic to central California.

== Description ==
Astragalus congdonii is a hairy perennial herb growing to heights between 20 and 70 centimeters. The sparse leaves are up to 14 centimeters long and are made up of several pairs of oval-shaped leaflets. The large, open inflorescence bears up to 35 cream-colored flowers, each about 1 to 1.5 centimeters long. The fruit is a narrow legume pod up to 3.5 centimeters long which dries to a thick papery texture. Flowers bloom March to June.

== Distribution and habitat ==
Astragalus congdonii is endemic to the Sierra Nevada foothills of central California. Its habitats include canyon sides, open brushy banks, and serpentinized bedrocks.
