= Astragalus panamintensis =

Conservation status
- Vulnerable (NatureServe)

Scientific classification
- Kingdom: Plantae
- Clade: Tracheophytes
- Clade: Angiosperms
- Clade: Eudicots
- Clade: Rosids
- Order: Fabales
- Family: Fabaceae
- Subfamily: Faboideae
- Genus: Astragalus
- Species: A. panamintensis

Binomial name
- Astragalus panamintensis E.Sheld.

Species of legume

Astragalus panamintensis is a species of milkvetch known by the common name Panamint milkvetch.

== Distribution ==
It is endemic to Inyo County, California, where it is native to the Panamint Range. It grows from cracks in the limestone cliffs of the desert mountains.

== Description ==
Astragalus panamintensis is a small, brambly perennial herb having wiry, tangled, silvery green stems up to 15 cm (5.9 in) long. The leaves are up to 12 cm (4.7 in) long and are made up of a thin central shaft bearing a few widely spaced, pointed linear leaflets.

The inflorescence holds one to four pinkish-purple flowers, each around a centimeter long. The fruit is a roughly hairy legume pod which is somewhat triangular in cross-section and dries to a papery texture. It may be nearly 2 cm (0.79 in) long.
