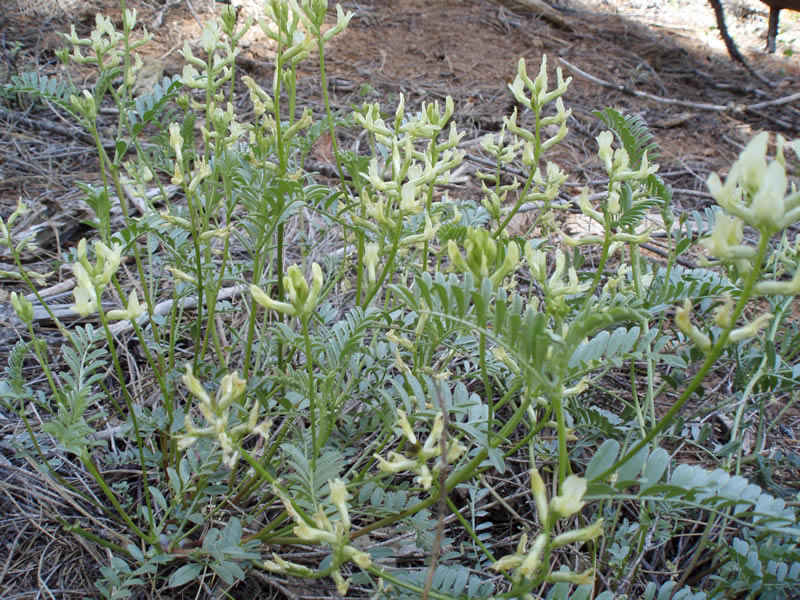

Conservation status
- Critically Imperiled (NatureServe)

Scientific classification
- Kingdom: Plantae
- Clade: Tracheophytes
- Clade: Angiosperms
- Clade: Eudicots
- Clade: Rosids
- Order: Fabales
- Family: Fabaceae
- Subfamily: Faboideae
- Genus: Astragalus
- Species: A. webberi

Binomial name
- Astragalus webberi A.Gray ex W.H.Brewer & S.Wats.

= Astragalus webberi =

Species of legume

Astragalus webberi is a rare species of milkvetch known by the common name Webber's milkvetch. It is endemic to the coniferous forests in the Sierra Nevada, in Plumas County, eastern California.

== Description ==
Astragalus webberi is a spreading perennial herb with stems up to 50 centimeters long, and part of the stem growing underground. The leaves are up to 15 centimeters long and made up of many oval-shaped leaflets. The inflorescence bears 6 to 14 cream colored flowers, each between one and two centimeters long. The fruit is a leathery legume pod 2 to 3.5 centimeters long.
