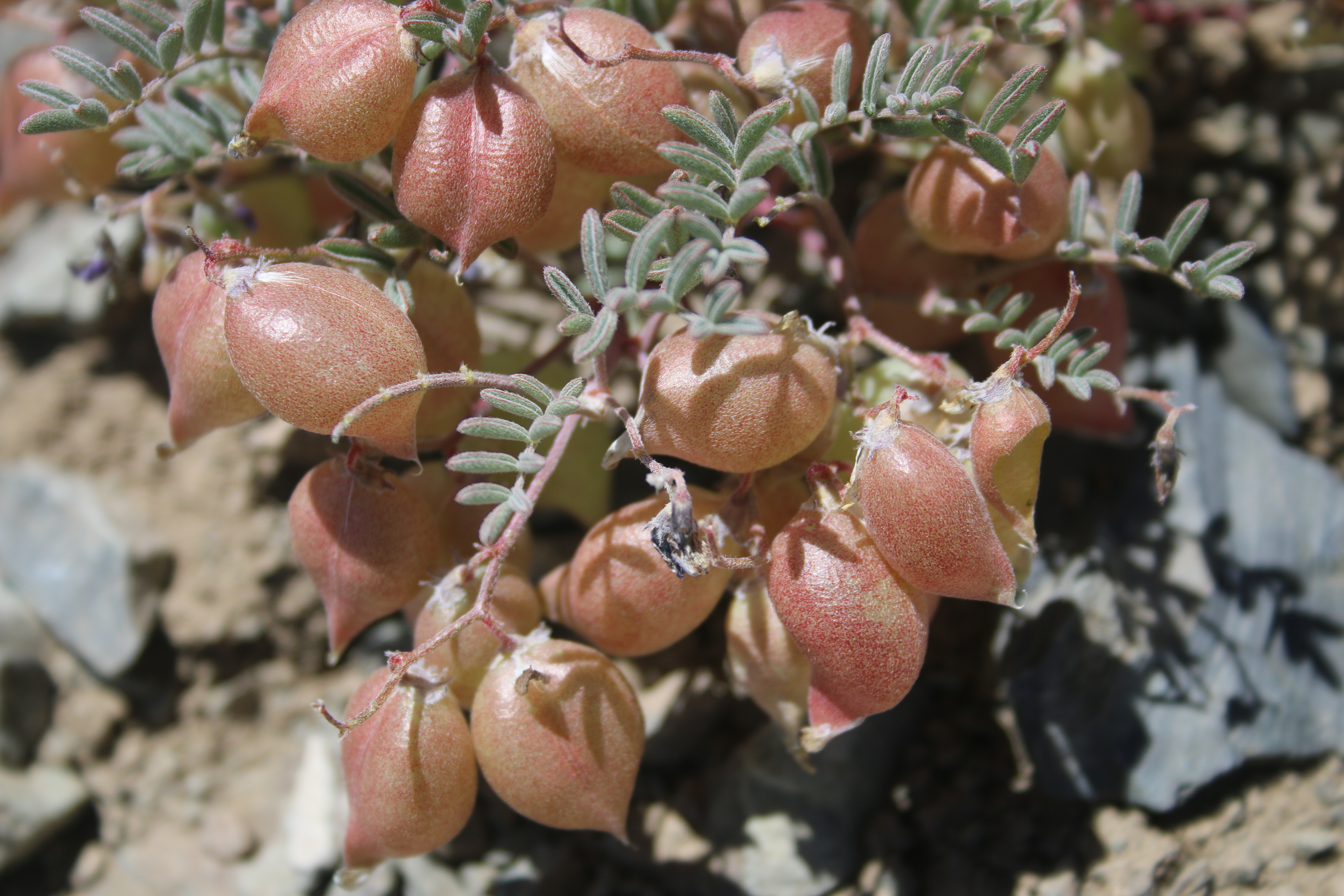

Conservation status
- Imperiled (NatureServe)

Scientific classification
- Kingdom: Plantae
- Clade: Tracheophytes
- Clade: Angiosperms
- Clade: Eudicots
- Clade: Rosids
- Order: Fabales
- Family: Fabaceae
- Subfamily: Faboideae
- Genus: Astragalus
- Species: A. gilmanii

Binomial name
- Astragalus gilmanii Tidestr.

= Astragalus gilmanii =

Species of legume

Astragalus gilmanii is a species of milkvetch known by the common name Gilman's milkvetch. It is native to the desert scrub and woodland of Nevada, the California Sierra Nevada and Inyo Mountains, and it is known from a few locations in the Panamint Range adjacent to Death Valley in California.

== Description ==
Astragalus gilmanii is a small, low-lying annual or perennial herb forming clumps of hairy stems up to 25 centimeters long. The leaves are up to about 7 centimeters long and are made up of several fuzzy, purple-margined green leaflets. The inflorescence bears 4 to 9 bright pinkish purple flowers each about 7 millimeters in length.

The flowers come in pink and purple. Its size can be anywhere from 1.9 to 9.8 inches tall.

The fruit is an inflated papery legume around 2 centimeters long. It contains several seeds in its single chamber.
