= Astragalus loanus =

Conservation status
- Critically Imperiled (NatureServe)

Scientific classification
- Kingdom: Plantae
- Clade: Embryophytes
- Clade: Tracheophytes
- Clade: Angiosperms
- Clade: Eudicots
- Clade: Rosids
- Order: Fabales
- Family: Fabaceae
- Subfamily: Faboideae
- Genus: Astragalus
- Species: A. loanus

Binomial name
- Astragalus loanus Barneby

Species of legume

Astragalus loanus is a rare species of flowering plant in the legume family known by the common name Glenwood milkvetch. It is endemic to Utah in the United States, where it occurs only in Sevier County. It is limited to volcanic gravel substrates.

This perennial herb is just a few centimeters tall. It is stemless, with a caudex covered in the remains of previous seasons' leaves. The leaves are up to 8 centimeters long and are made up of several pairs of small leaflets. The flowers are yellowish or greenish white with purple tips. Blooming occurs in May and June. The fruit is an inflated legume pod covered in shiny hairs. It is up to 3 centimeters long.
