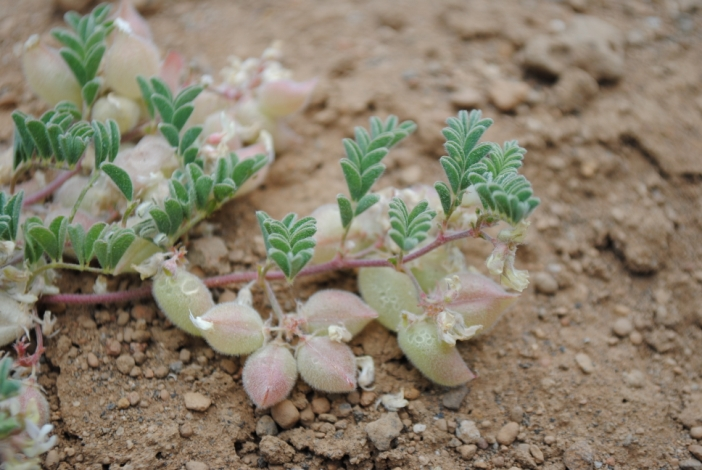
- var. suksdorfi

Scientific classification
- Kingdom: Plantae
- Clade: Tracheophytes
- Clade: Angiosperms
- Clade: Eudicots
- Clade: Rosids
- Order: Fabales
- Family: Fabaceae
- Subfamily: Faboideae
- Genus: Astragalus
- Species: A. pulsiferae

Binomial name
- Astragalus pulsiferae A.Gray

= Astragalus pulsiferae =

Species of legume

Astragalus pulsiferae is a species of milkvetch known by the common name Ames's milkvetch. It is native to California and Nevada, and it is known but rare in Washington. It is known from many habitat types, including mountains and plateaus.

== Description ==
This is a very small perennial herb forming small mats or patches on the ground. The hairy stems are generally less than 3 cm (1.2 in) long. The leaves may grow to about 5 cm (2.0 in) long and are made up of several oval shaped leaflets. The inflorescence is an array of 3 to 13 small flowers, each white with purplish veins and tips.

The fruit is a rounded legume pod 1 to 2 cm (0.39 to 0.79 in) long which dries to a very thin papery texture and has a coat of hairs.
