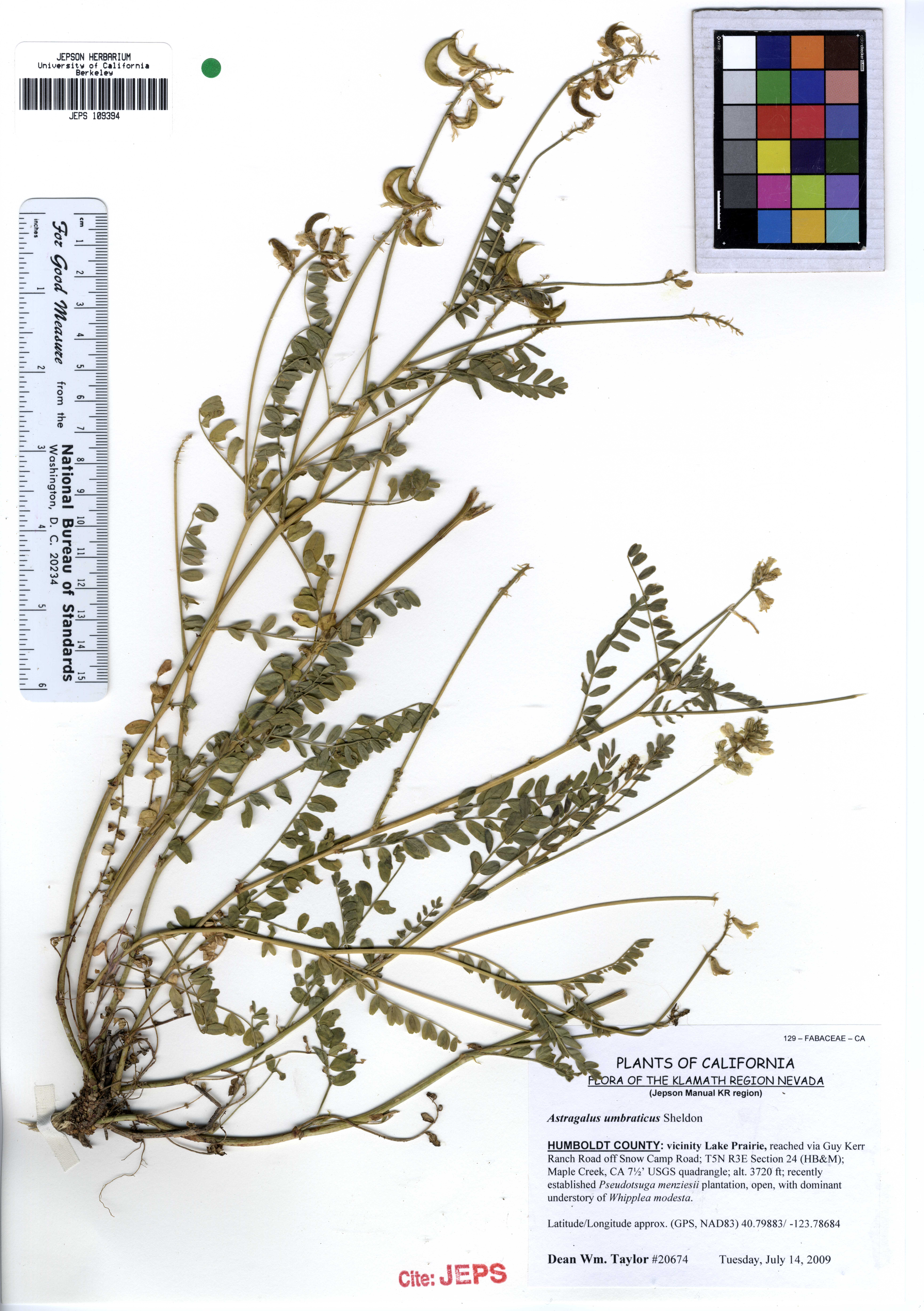

Scientific classification
- Kingdom: Plantae
- Clade: Tracheophytes
- Clade: Angiosperms
- Clade: Eudicots
- Clade: Rosids
- Order: Fabales
- Family: Fabaceae
- Subfamily: Faboideae
- Genus: Astragalus
- Species: A. umbraticus

Binomial name
- Astragalus umbraticus E.Sheld.

= Astragalus umbraticus =

Species of legume

Astragalus umbraticus is a species of milkvetch known by the common name Bald Mountain milkvetch.

It is native to western Oregon and northwestern California, where it grows in the woodlands of the coastal Klamath Mountains, Outer Northern California Coast Ranges, and Oregon Coast Ranges.

== Description ==
Astragalus umbraticus is an erect, branching perennial herb growing up to 50 centimeters tall. The leaves are up to 12 centimeters long and made up of many oblong or rounded leaflets.

The inflorescence is an array of 10 to 25 greenish white flowers. The fruit is a curving legume pod drying to a thick, papery texture and black color.
