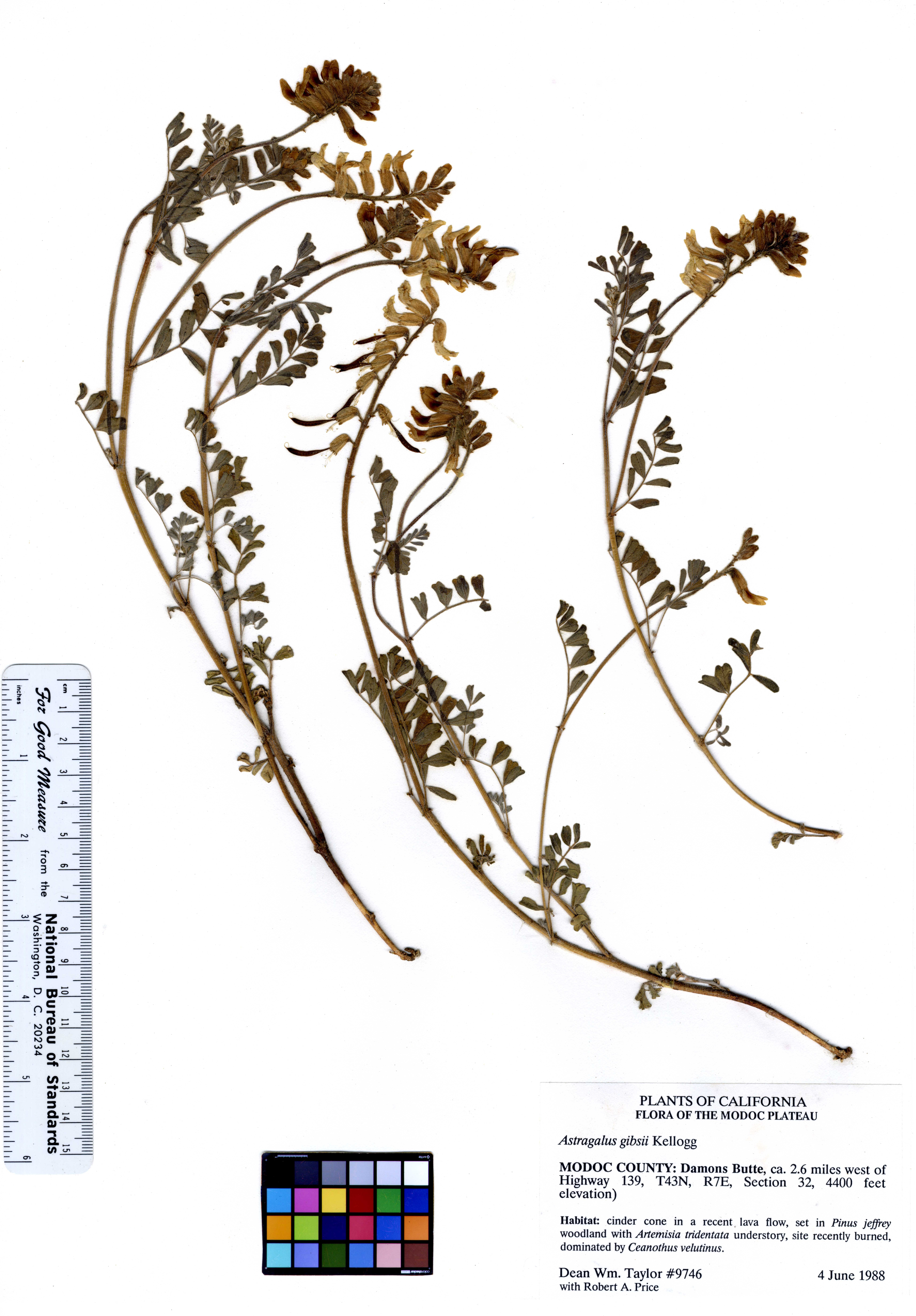

Conservation status
- Apparently Secure (NatureServe)

Scientific classification
- Kingdom: Plantae
- Clade: Tracheophytes
- Clade: Angiosperms
- Clade: Eudicots
- Clade: Rosids
- Order: Fabales
- Family: Fabaceae
- Subfamily: Faboideae
- Genus: Astragalus
- Species: A. gibbsii

Binomial name
- Astragalus gibbsii Kellogg

= Astragalus gibbsii =

Gibbs's milkvetch

Species of legume

Astragalus gibbsii is a species of milkvetch known by the common name Gibbs's milkvetch. It is native to eastern California, the north-central Sierra Nevada, and western Nevada, where it grows in the pine forest habitat of the mountains and the sagebrush of the plateaus.

== Description ==
Astragalus gibbsii is low-lying perennial herb forming clumps of hairy, gray-green stems up to 35 centimeters long. Leaves are up to about 9 centimeters long and are made up of several pairs of oval to oblong leaflets. The large inflorescence bears up to 30 yellowish or cream-colored pouched, podlike flowers, each between 1 and 2 centimeters long.

The fruit is a hanging legume pod 2 to 3 centimeters long. It is fleshy when new and dries to a hairy, leathery texture.
