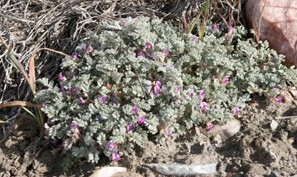

Conservation status
- Imperiled (NatureServe)

Scientific classification
- Kingdom: Plantae
- Clade: Embryophytes
- Clade: Tracheophytes
- Clade: Angiosperms
- Clade: Eudicots
- Clade: Rosids
- Order: Fabales
- Family: Fabaceae
- Subfamily: Faboideae
- Genus: Astragalus
- Species: A. anserinus

Binomial name
- Astragalus anserinus Atwood, Goodrich, & Welch

= Astragalus anserinus =

Goose Creek milkvetch

Species of legume

Astragalus anserinus, also called the Goose Creek milkvetch, is a member of the genus Astragalus that is listed as a candidate species under the Endangered Species Act. It grows in a 10-square-mile (26 km^{2}) area of the Goose Watershed of the Upper Snake Basin in Idaho, Nevada and Utah.
