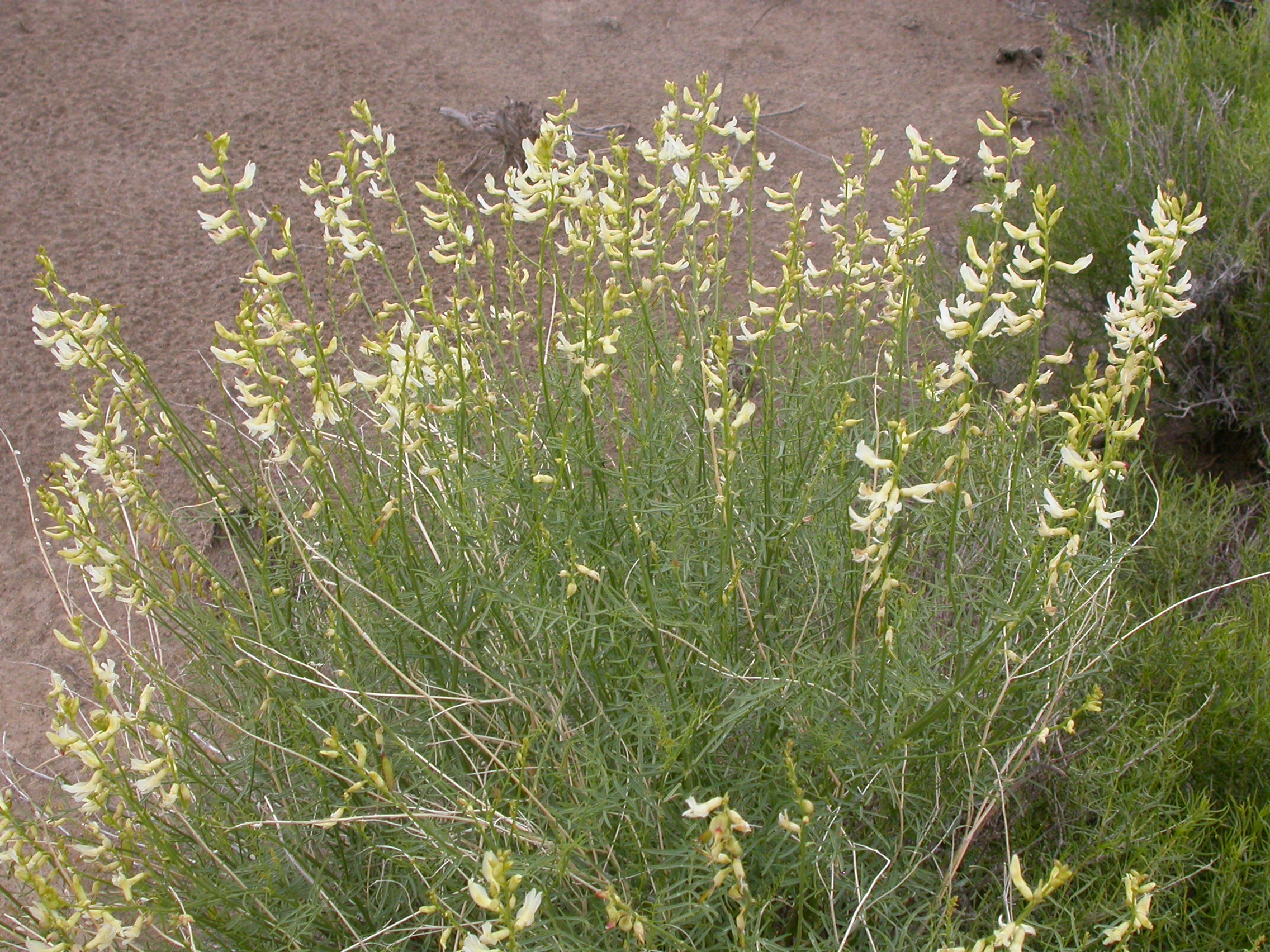

Scientific classification
- Kingdom: Plantae
- Clade: Embryophytes
- Clade: Tracheophytes
- Clade: Spermatophytes
- Clade: Angiosperms
- Clade: Eudicots
- Clade: Rosids
- Order: Fabales
- Family: Fabaceae
- Subfamily: Faboideae
- Genus: Astragalus
- Species: A. filipes

Binomial name
- Astragalus filipes Torr. ex A.Gray

= Astragalus filipes =

Basalt milkvetch

Species of legume

Astragalus filipes is a species of milkvetch known by the common name basalt milkvetch. It is native to western North America from British Columbia to California to Utah, where it grows in many types of habitat, especially dry areas.

== Description ==
Astragalus filipes is a clumpy perennial herb growing 30 to 90 centimetres (12 to 35 in) tall. The leaves are up to 12 cm long and made up of several widely spaced leaflets which are linear to oval in shape. The open inflorescence holds up to 30 off-white to pale yellow flowers each 1 to 1.5 cm long.

The fruit is a hanging legume pod up to 3 cm long. It is long and thin and dries to a papery texture.

== Range ==
Basalt milkvetch is native to the westernmost part of North America. In Canada it is only found in British Columbia, but in the northwestern US it grows in Washington, Idaho, and Oregon. In the southwest it has been recorded in California, Nevada, and Utah, but in Mexico it is only found in Baja California.
