= Astragalus bicristatus =

Conservation status
- Vulnerable (NatureServe)

Scientific classification
- Kingdom: Plantae
- Clade: Embryophytes
- Clade: Tracheophytes
- Clade: Angiosperms
- Clade: Eudicots
- Clade: Rosids
- Order: Fabales
- Family: Fabaceae
- Subfamily: Faboideae
- Genus: Astragalus
- Species: A. bicristatus

Binomial name
- Astragalus bicristatus A.Gray

Species of legume

Astragalus bicristatus is a species of milkvetch known by the common names crested milkvetch and two-crested milkvetch. It is endemic to southern California, where it grows in the coniferous forests of the San Gabriel and San Bernardino Mountains of the Transverse Ranges.

== Distribution and habitat ==
It has a global rank of G3, which means it is vulnerable. It is found in the habitat of Yellow Pine Forests. It has major toxicity, probably from eating it.

== Description ==
Astragalus bicristatus is a perennial herb sprawling outwards with stems to a maximum length approaching half a meter. The leaves are up to 14 centimeters long and are made up of very widely spaced narrow linear leaflets. The stems and foliage have sparse grayish hairs, giving them a rough texture. The inflorescence is a loose array of up to 20 pealike flowers. Each flower is between 1 and 2 centimeters long and is purple-tinted white to light greenish yellow.

Its bloom period is between the months of May and August.

The fruit is a hanging capsule 2 to 4 centimeters long and curved or crescent-shaped. It is fleshy when immature and leathery to woody when dried.
