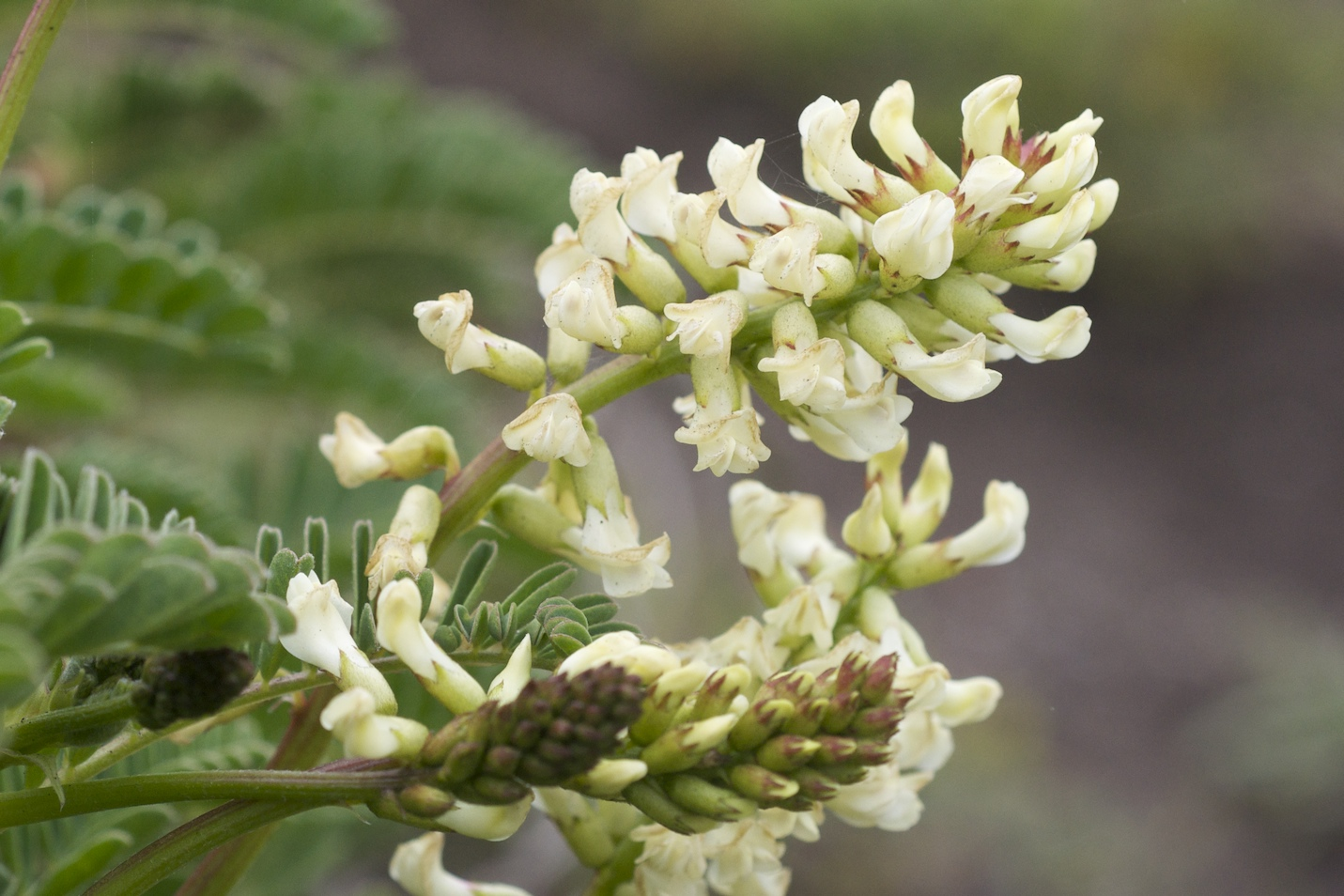

Scientific classification
- Kingdom: Plantae
- Clade: Tracheophytes
- Clade: Angiosperms
- Clade: Eudicots
- Clade: Rosids
- Order: Fabales
- Family: Fabaceae
- Subfamily: Faboideae
- Genus: Astragalus
- Species: A. nuttallii

Binomial name
- Astragalus nuttallii (Torr. & A.Gray) J.T.Howell

= Astragalus nuttallii =

Species of legume

Astragalus nuttallii is a species of milkvetch known by the common name Nuttall's milkvetch. It is native to California and Baja California, where it grows in the sandy soils of coastal habitat. This is a perennial herb forming thick, tangled clumps of hairy to hairless stems up to a meter in length. The abundant leaves are up to 17 centimeters in length and made up of many oval-shaped leaflets. The inflorescence is a large, dense body of up to 125 flowers, each around 1 to 1.5 centimeters long. The flowers are dull cream-colored and sometimes purple-tinted. The fruit is an inflated legume pod up to 6 centimeters long which dries to a papery texture and contains many seeds in its single chamber. One variety of this species, the ocean bluff milkvetch (var. nuttallii) is endemic to the Central Coast of California.
