= Coleophora euryaula =

Scientific classification
- Kingdom: Animalia
- Phylum: Arthropoda
- Class: Insecta
- Order: Lepidoptera
- Family: Coleophoridae
- Genus: Coleophora
- Species: C. euryaula

Binomial name
- Coleophora euryaula Meyrick, 1925

Synonyms
- Coleophora vigilis Meyrick, 1925

Species of moth

Coleophora euryaula is a moth of the family Coleophoridae. It is found in Egypt.

The larvae feed on the leaves and fruits of Lycium europaeum and possibly Astragalus forskahlei.
