= Coleophora hippodromica =

Scientific classification
- Kingdom: Animalia
- Phylum: Arthropoda
- Class: Insecta
- Order: Lepidoptera
- Family: Coleophoridae
- Genus: Coleophora
- Species: C. hippodromica

Binomial name
- Coleophora hippodromica Walsingham, 1907

Species of moth

Coleophora hippodromica is a moth of the family Coleophoridae. It is found in North Africa.

The larvae feed on Astragalus gombo. They create a dark brown leaf case, composed of a single piece of leaf (mined tip of a leaflet). Larvae can be found from autumn to March.
