= List of Fabales of Montana =

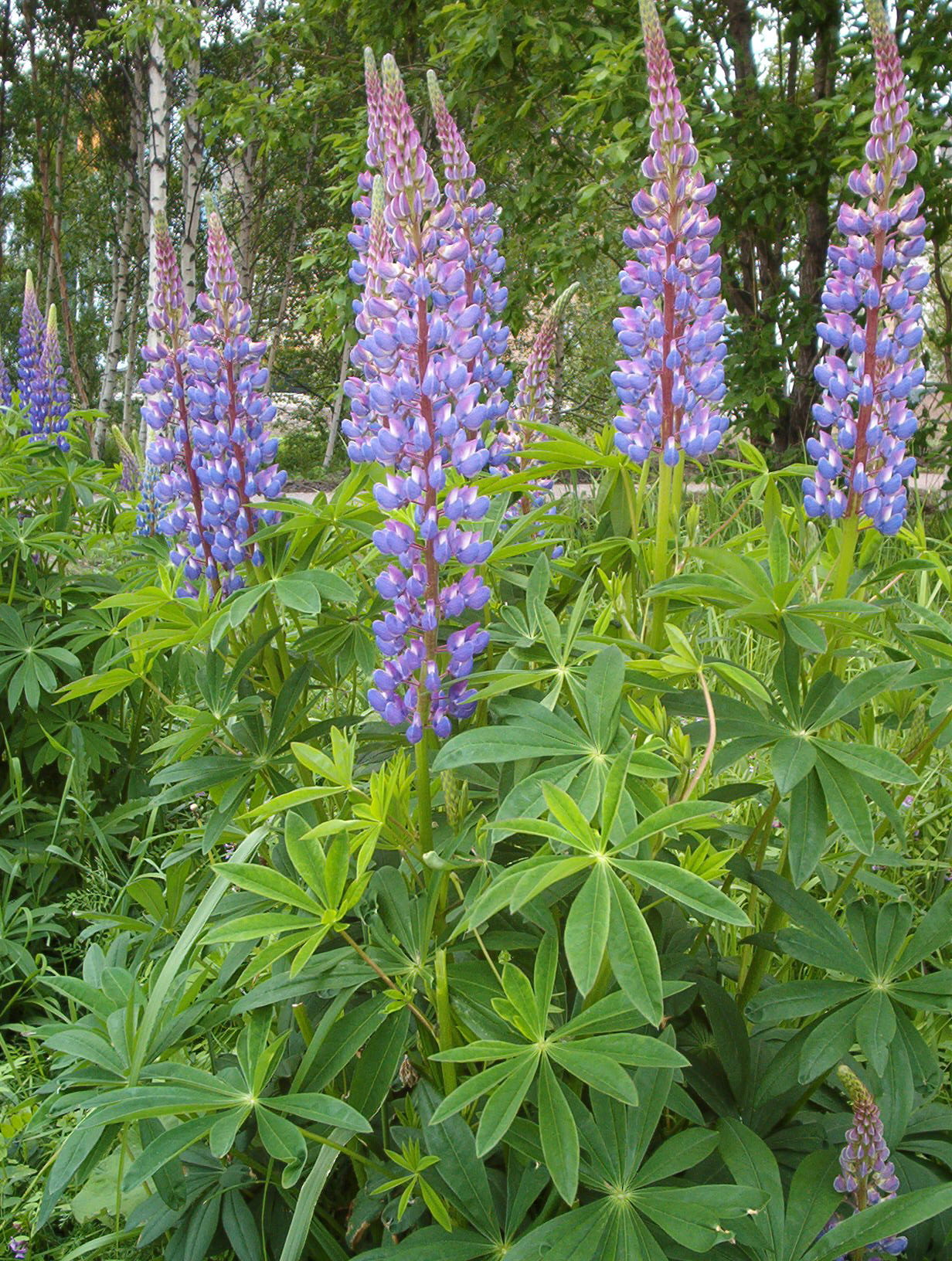
Bigleaf lupine

There are at least 174 members of the pea family, Fabaceae, found in Montana. Some of these species are exotics (not native to Montana) and some species have been designated as Species of Concern.

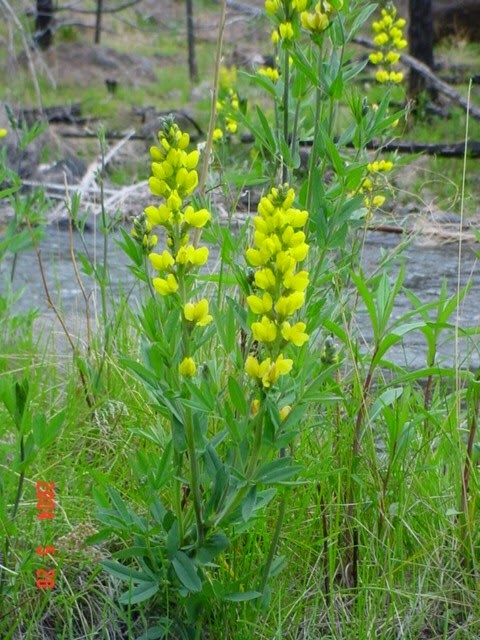
Mountain goldenbanner

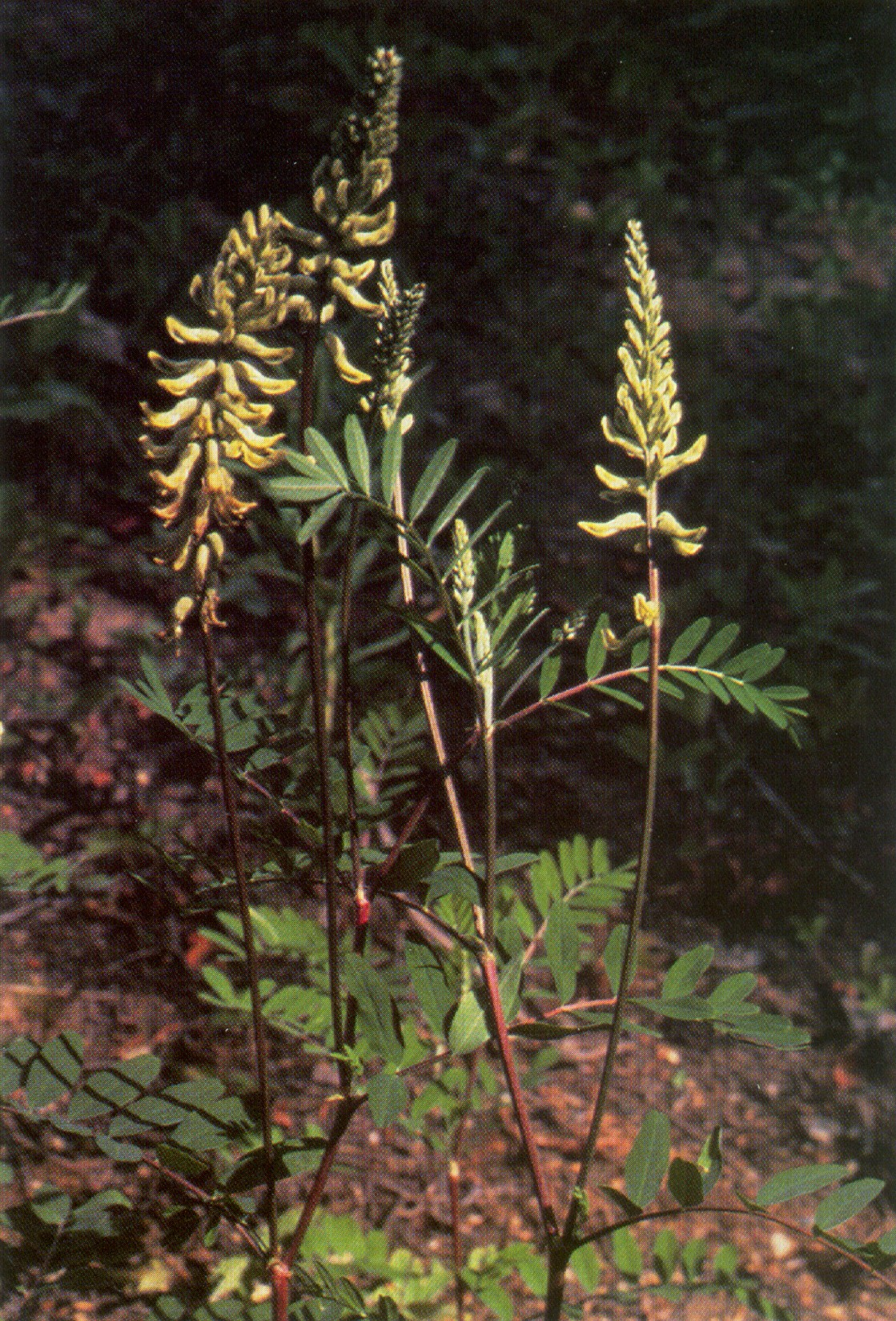
Canadian milkvetch

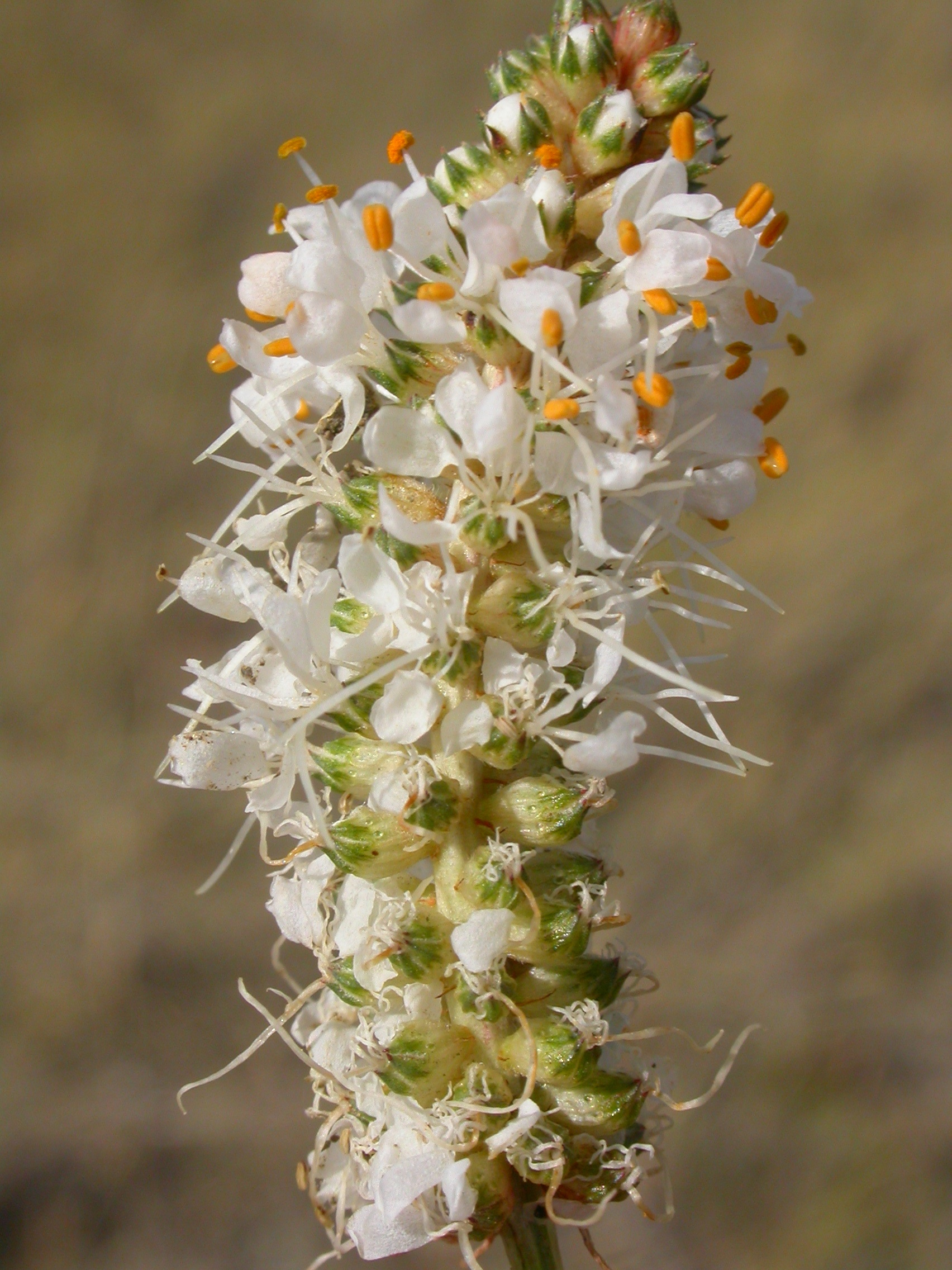
White prairie clover

- Amorpha canescens, lead plant
- Astragalus adsurgens, rattle milkvetch
- Astragalus agrestis, meadow milkvetch
- Astragalus alpinus, alpine milkvetch
- Astragalus americanus, American milkvetch
- Astragalus aretioides, sweetwater milkvetch
- Astragalus argophyllus, silver-leaved milkvetch
- Astragalus atropubescens, Kelsey's milkvetch
- Astragalus australis, Indian milkvetch
- Astragalus barrii, Barr's milkvetch
- Astragalus bisulcatus, two-grooved milkvetch
- Astragalus bourgovii, Bourgeau's milkvetch
- Astragalus canadensis, Canadian milkvetch
- Astragalus canadensis, Morton's Canadian milkvetch
- Astragalus canadensis, shorttooth Canadian milkvetch
- Astragalus ceramicus, painted milkvetch
- Astragalus ceramicus, pottery milkvetch
- Astragalus chamaeleuce, ground milkvetch
- Astragalus cibarius, browse milkvetch
- Astragalus cicer, chickpea milkvetch
- Astragalus convallarius, lesser rushy milkvetch
- Astragalus crassicarpus, groundplum milkvetch
- Astragalus drummondii, Drummond's milkvetch
- Astragalus eucosmus, pretty milkvetch
- Astragalus falcatus, Russian milkvetch
- Astragalus flexuosus, flexible milkvetch
- Astragalus geyeri, Geyer's milkvetch
- Astragalus gilviflorus, threeleaf milkvetch
- Astragalus gracilis, slender milkvetch
- Astragalus grayi, Gray's milkvetch
- Astragalus hyalinus, summer milkvetch
- Astragalus inflexus, bent milkvetch
- Astragalus kentrophyta, mat milkvetch
- Astragalus kentrophyta, spiny milkvetch
- Astragalus kentrophyta, spiny milkvetch
- Astragalus lackschewitzii, Lackschewitz' milkvetch
- Astragalus lentiginosus, freckled milkvetch
- Astragalus lentiginosus, sodaville milkvetch
- Astragalus leptaleus, park milkvetch
- Astragalus lotiflorus, low milkvetch
- Astragalus microcystis, least bladdery milkvetch
- Astragalus miser, Yellowstone milkvetch
- Astragalus miser, prostrate milkvetch
- Astragalus miser, timber milkvetch
- Astragalus miser, woody milkvetch
- Astragalus missouriensis, Missouri milkvetch
- Astragalus oreganus, wind river milkvetch
- Astragalus pectinatus, narrowleaf milkvetch
- Astragalus plattensis, Platte River milkvetch
- Astragalus platytropis, broad-keeled milkvetch
- Astragalus purshii, Pursh's milkvetch
- Astragalus purshii, woollypod milkvetch
- Astragalus racemosus, raceme milkvetch
- Astragalus robbinsii, Robbins' milkvetch
- Astragalus scaphoides, bitterroot milkvetch
- Astragalus shortianus, Short's milkvetch
- Astragalus spatulatus, tufted milkvetch
- Astragalus tenellus, loose-flower milkvetch
- Astragalus terminalis, railhead milkvetch
- Astragalus vexilliflexus, bent-flowered milkvetch
- Caragana arborescens, siberian peashrub
- Coronilla varia, common crown-vetch
- Cytisus scoparius, Scotch broom
- Dalea candida, white prairie clover
- Dalea enneandra, nine-anther prairie clover
- Dalea purpurea, purple prairie clover
- Dalea villosa, silky prairie clover
- Glycyrrhiza lepidota, wild licorice
- Hedysarum alpinum, apline sweet-vetch
- Hedysarum boreale, boreal sweet-vetch
- Hedysarum occidentale, western sweet-vetch
- Hedysarum sulphurescens, yellow sweet-vetch
- Lathyrus bijugatus, latah tule pea
- Lathyrus latifolius, broad-leaf peavine
- Lathyrus ochroleucus, pale vetchling peavine
- Lathyrus sylvestris, flat pea
- Lathyrus tuberosus, earth-nut peavine
- Lotus corniculatus, garden bird's-foot-trefoil
- Lotus tenuis, slender trefoil
- Lotus unifoliolatus, American bird's-foot trefoil
- Lupinus arbustus, long-spur lupine
- Lupinus argenteus, depressed lupine
- Lupinus argenteus, lodgepole lupine
- Lupinus argenteus, silvery lupine
- Lupinus caespitosus, stemless-dwarf lupine
- Lupinus caudatus, Kellogg's spurred lupine
- Lupinus leucophyllus, woolly-leaf lupine
- Lupinus polyphyllus, Burke's lupine
- Lupinus polyphyllus, Wyeth's lupine
- Lupinus polyphyllus, bigleaf lupine
- Lupinus pusillus, small lupine
- Lupinus sericeus, Pursh's silky lupine
- Medicago falcata, yellow alfalfa
- Medicago lupulina, black medic
- Medicago polymorpha, toothed medic
- Medicago sativa, alfalfa
- Melilotus albus, white sweetclover
- Melilotus officinalis, yellow sweetclover
- Onobrychis viciifolia, common sainfoin
- Oxytropis besseyi, Bessey's locoweed
- Oxytropis besseyi, Montana locoweed
- Oxytropis borealis, boreal locoweed
- Oxytropis campestris, Columbia locoweed
- Oxytropis campestris, Cusick's locoweed
- Oxytropis campestris, field locoweed
- Oxytropis campestris, yellow-flower locoweed
- Oxytropis deflexa, blue nodding locoweed
- Oxytropis deflexa, nodding locoweed
- Oxytropis lagopus, hare's-foot locoweed
- Oxytropis lambertii, purple locoweed
- Oxytropis parryi, Parry's locoweed
- Oxytropis podocarpa, stalked-pod locoweed
- Oxytropis riparia, Ruby Valley locoweed
- Oxytropis sericea, white locoweed
- Oxytropis splendens, showy locoweed
- Pediomelum argophyllum, silvery scurfpea
- Pediomelum cuspidatum, large-bracted scurf-pea
- Pediomelum esculentum, pomme-de-prairie
- Pediomelum hypogaeum, little Indian breadroot
- Psoralidium lanceolatum, lance-leaf scurfpea
- Psoralidium tenuiflorum, few-flowered scurfpea
- Robinia pseudoacacia, black locust
- Sphaerophysa salsula, bladder-vetch
- Thermopsis montana, mountain goldenbanner
- Thermopsis montana, slender goldenbanner
- Thermopsis rhombifolia, roundleaf thermopsis
- Trifolium arvense, rabbit-foot clover
- Trifolium aureum, yellow clover
- Trifolium beckwithii, Beckwith's clover
- Trifolium campestre, low hop clover
- Trifolium cyathiferum, cup clover
- Trifolium dasyphyllum, whip-root clover
- Trifolium dubium, suckling clover
- Trifolium eriocephalum, woolly-head clover
- Trifolium fragiferum, strawberry-head clover
- Trifolium gymnocarpon, hollyleaf clover
- Trifolium haydenii, Hayden clover
- Trifolium hybridum, alsike clover
- Trifolium latifolium, twin clover
- Trifolium longipes, long-stalk clover
- Trifolium microcephalum, woolly clover
- Trifolium nanum, dwarf clover
- Trifolium parryi, Parry's clover
- Trifolium pratense, red clover
- Trifolium repens, white clover
- Trifolium variegatum, white-tip clover
- Trifolium wormskioldii, Wormskjold's clover
- Vicia americana, American purple vetch
- Vicia americana, American vetch
- Vicia americana, mat vetch
- Vicia cracca, tufted vetch
- Vicia sativa, spring vetch
- Vicia tetrasperma, lentil vetch
- Vicia villosa, winter vetch

== See also ==
- List of dicotyledons of Montana
