= Chionodes braunella =

Scientific classification
- Kingdom: Animalia
- Phylum: Arthropoda
- Clade: Pancrustacea
- Class: Insecta
- Order: Lepidoptera
- Family: Gelechiidae
- Genus: Chionodes
- Species: C. braunella

Binomial name
- Chionodes braunella (Keifer, 1931)

Synonyms
- Gelechia braunella Keifer, 1931; Gelechia braunella arborei Keifer, 1931; Chionodes loetae Clarke, 1942

Species of moth

Chionodes braunella is a moth in the family, Gelechiidae. It is found in North America, where it has been recorded from Alberta and British Columbia to Colorado, Arizona, California and to Washington, southern Ontario and Maine.

The larvae feed on Lupinus albifrons, Lupinus arboreus, Lupinus chamissionis, Lupinus excubitus, Lupinus ornatus, Lupinus peirsonii, Lupinus varicolor, Lotus scoparius, Trifolium eriocephalum, Trifolium wormskioldii, Vicia americana, Lathyrus vestitus, Lathyrus sulphureus and Gaylussacia species.
