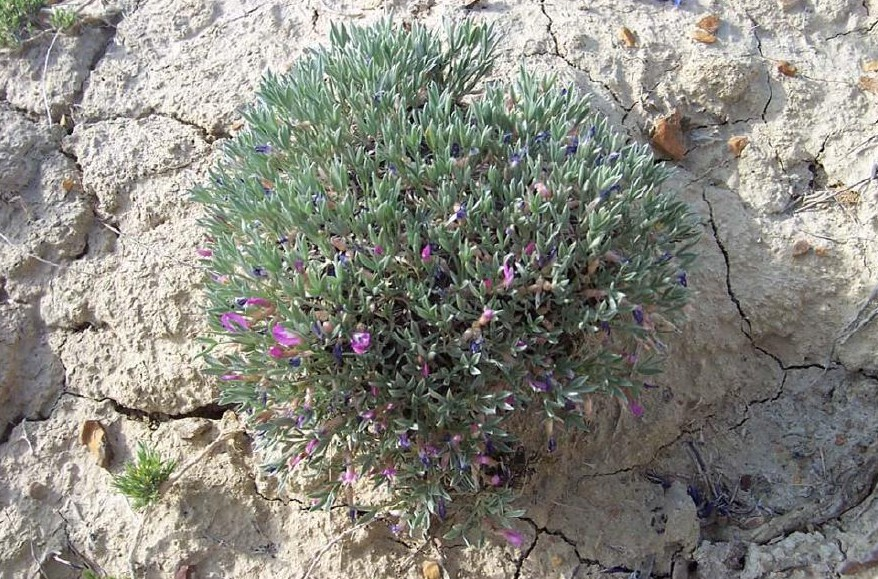

Conservation status
- Vulnerable (NatureServe)

Scientific classification
- Kingdom: Plantae
- Clade: Tracheophytes
- Clade: Angiosperms
- Clade: Eudicots
- Clade: Rosids
- Order: Fabales
- Family: Fabaceae
- Subfamily: Faboideae
- Genus: Astragalus
- Species: A. barrii

Binomial name
- Astragalus barrii Barneby

= Astragalus barrii =

Barr's milkvetch

Species of legume

Astragalus barrii is a species of flowering plant in the legume family known by the common name Barr's milkvetch. It is native to the United States, where it is a "regional endemic", occurring in parts of southwestern South Dakota, northeastern Wyoming, southeastern Montana, and Nebraska.

This mat-forming perennial herb grows only about 4 inches in height. The leaves are each made up of three lance-shaped leaflets. The herbage is coated in white hairs which are dolabriform, or shaped like the head of an ax. The inflorescence contains iridescent pinkish purple flowers with petals up to 1.7 centimeters long. The fruit is a legume pod up to 8 millimeters in length. Blooming occurs in late April through mid-June; April flowering generally only occurs in years with light snowfall.

This plant occurs on buttes and badlands in the Powder River Basin and surrounding areas. The habitat is generally mixed-grass prairie on limestone, sandstone, shale, or siltstone. It grows alongside other species of Astragalus including A. gilviflorus, A. hyalinus, A. bisulcatus, A. racemosus, and A. spatulatus, and it must be in flower to be distinguished from other species with three leaflets on each leaf.

This plant was first collected in 1900 in Wyoming. It was described as a species in 1956 and named for the botanist and cattle rancher Claude Arno Barr (1887–1982).
