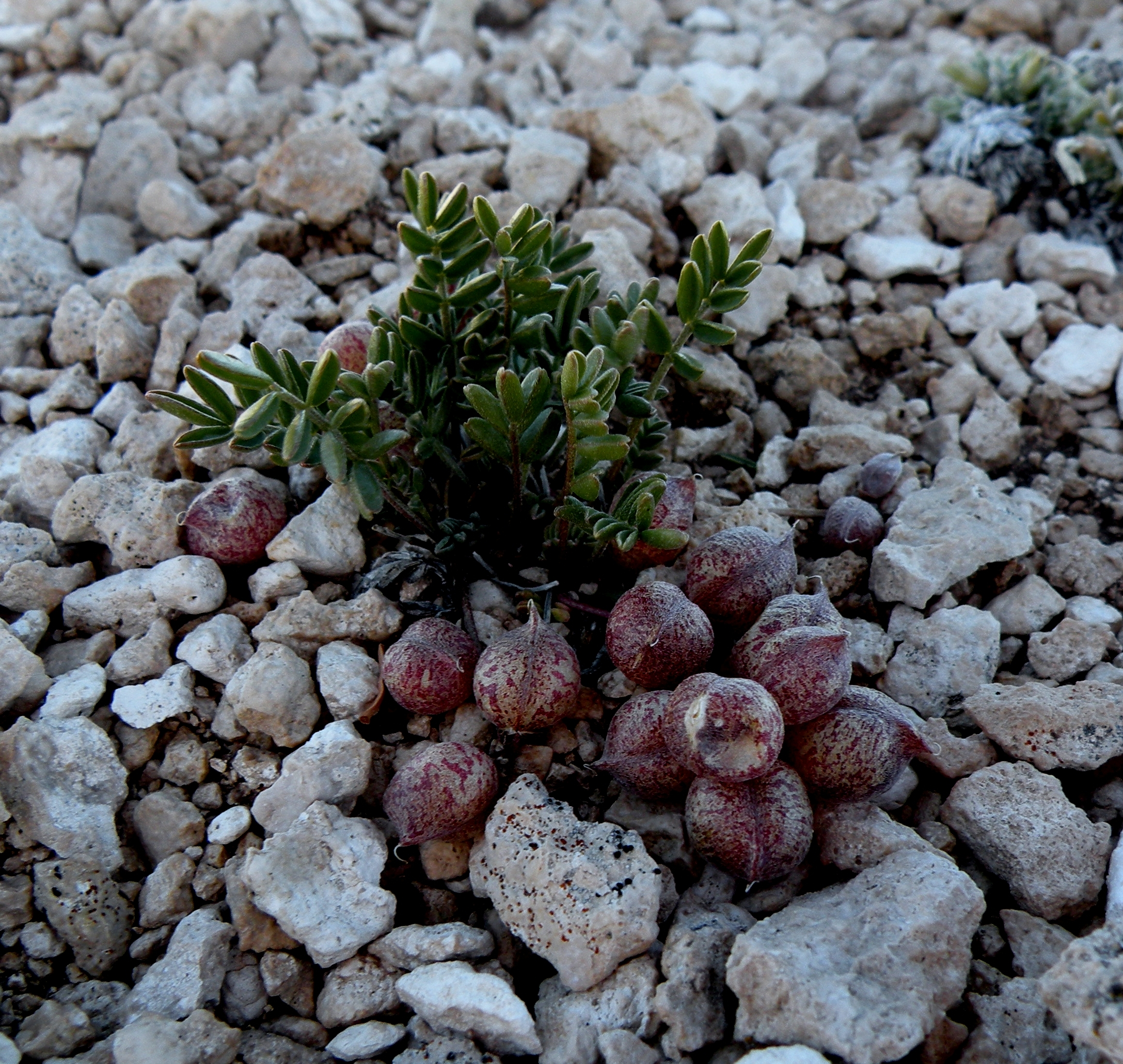

Conservation status
- Threatened (ESA)

Scientific classification
- Kingdom: Plantae
- Clade: Tracheophytes
- Clade: Angiosperms
- Clade: Eudicots
- Clade: Rosids
- Order: Fabales
- Family: Fabaceae
- Subfamily: Faboideae
- Genus: Astragalus
- Species: A. limnocharis
- Variety: A. l. var. montii

Trinomial name
- Astragalus limnocharis var. montii (S.L.Welsh) Isely

Synonyms
- Astragalus montii S.L.Welsh; Astragalus limnocharis var. tabulaeus S.L.Welsh

= Astragalus limnocharis var. montii =

Subspecies of legume

Astragalus limnocharis var. montii, synonym Astragalus montii, is a rare variety of flowering plant in the legume family. It is known by the common name Monti's milkvetch. It is endemic to Utah in the United States, where there are only three known populations. Under the synonym A. montii, it is a federally listed threatened species of the United States.

This plant is a small perennial herb growing just a few centimeters tall. The leaves are pinnately compound, with several pairs of leaflets. The inflorescence contains two to eight flowers which are pinkish purple in color with white wing-tips. The fruit is an inflated legume pod which is pinkish in color with purple mottling. Blooming occurs in the summer months. The flowers are pollinated by a number of native bee species, especially genus Osmia.

This plant is endemic to the Wasatch Plateau of central Utah. The three populations are located in an eight-mile stretch of mountainous habitat in the Manti-La Sal National Forest. There is a population on White Mountain, one on Heliotrope Mountain, and one on the ridgecrest connecting Heliotrope Mountain to Ferron Mountain. The subalpine habitat is made up of limestone shale barrens near the timberline. Other plants in the habitat include cushion phlox (Phlox pulvinata), alpine false springparsley (Pseudocymopterus montanus), woolly groundsel (Packera cana), spiny milkvetch (Astragalus kentrophyta), shortstem buckwheat (Eriogonum brevicaule), Bear River fleabane (Erigeron ursinus), sheep cinquefoil (Potentilla ovina), and elegant cinquefoil (Potentilla concinna).

The main threat to populations is energy development. The area is experiencing active oil and gas exploration. This is the main reason it was added to the Endangered Species List with threatened status in 1987.
