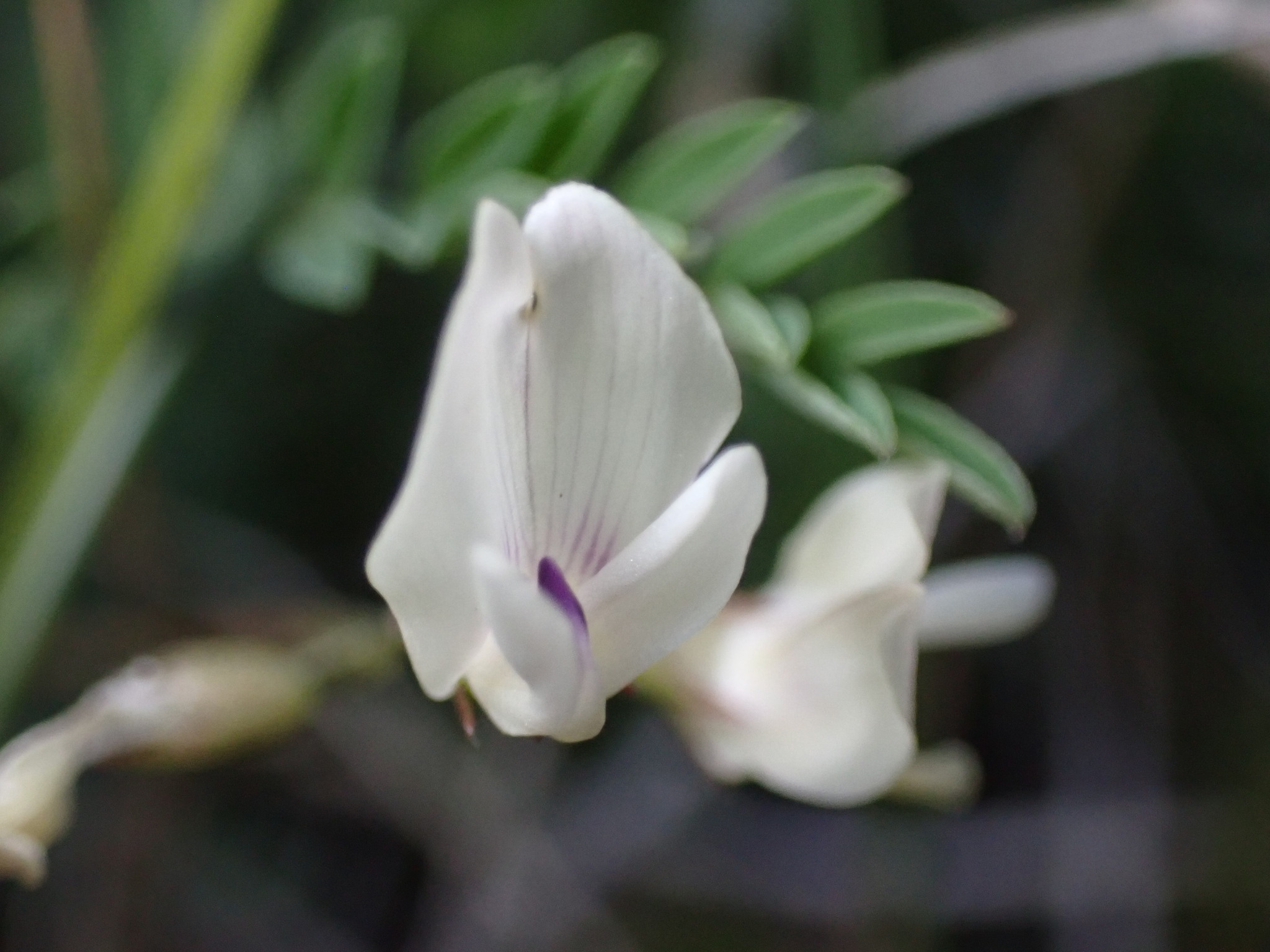

Conservation status
- Vulnerable (NatureServe)

Scientific classification
- Kingdom: Plantae
- Clade: Embryophytes
- Clade: Tracheophytes
- Clade: Angiosperms
- Clade: Eudicots
- Clade: Rosids
- Order: Fabales
- Family: Fabaceae
- Subfamily: Faboideae
- Genus: Astragalus
- Species: A. leptaleus

Binomial name
- Astragalus leptaleus A.Gray

Synonyms
- List: Astragalus pauciflorus A.Gray 1863); Phaca leptalea (A.Gray) Rydb. (1913); Phaca pauciflora Nutt. (1838); Tragacantha leptalea (A.Gray) Kuntze (1891)

= Astragalus leptaleus =

Species of flowering plant in the milkvetch genus

Astragalus leptaleus is a species of flowering plant in the legume family known by the common name park milkvetch. It is native to the Rocky Mountains of the United States, where it occurs in Idaho, Montana, Wyoming, and Colorado.

This rhizomatous perennial herb grows from a taproot and underground branching caudex unit. It has one or more stems up to 20 centimeters long and may form mats. Each leaf is made up of up to 27 leaflets. Flowers are borne in calyces of sepals coated in black hairs. The flowers are cream-white with a purple spot near the tip of the keel. The fruit is a legume pod up to 2.5 centimeters long which is covered in black and white hairs. Blooming time is June through August.

This is mainly a plant of wetlands, often growing on streambanks with willows, such as Salix geyeriana. It grows in the ecotone between wet river habitat and drier upland sites. Common associated plants include Poa pratensis, Juncus balticus, and Sisyrinchium idahoense. It may occur with rare plants such as Astragalus diversifolius, Phlox kelseyi, Salix candida, Carex livida, Primula alcalina, and Lomatogonium rotatum.

The main threats to this species include those associated with habitat modification, such as the conversion of meadows to hay fields. Other threats include livestock grazing, off-road vehicles, and introduced species of plants.
