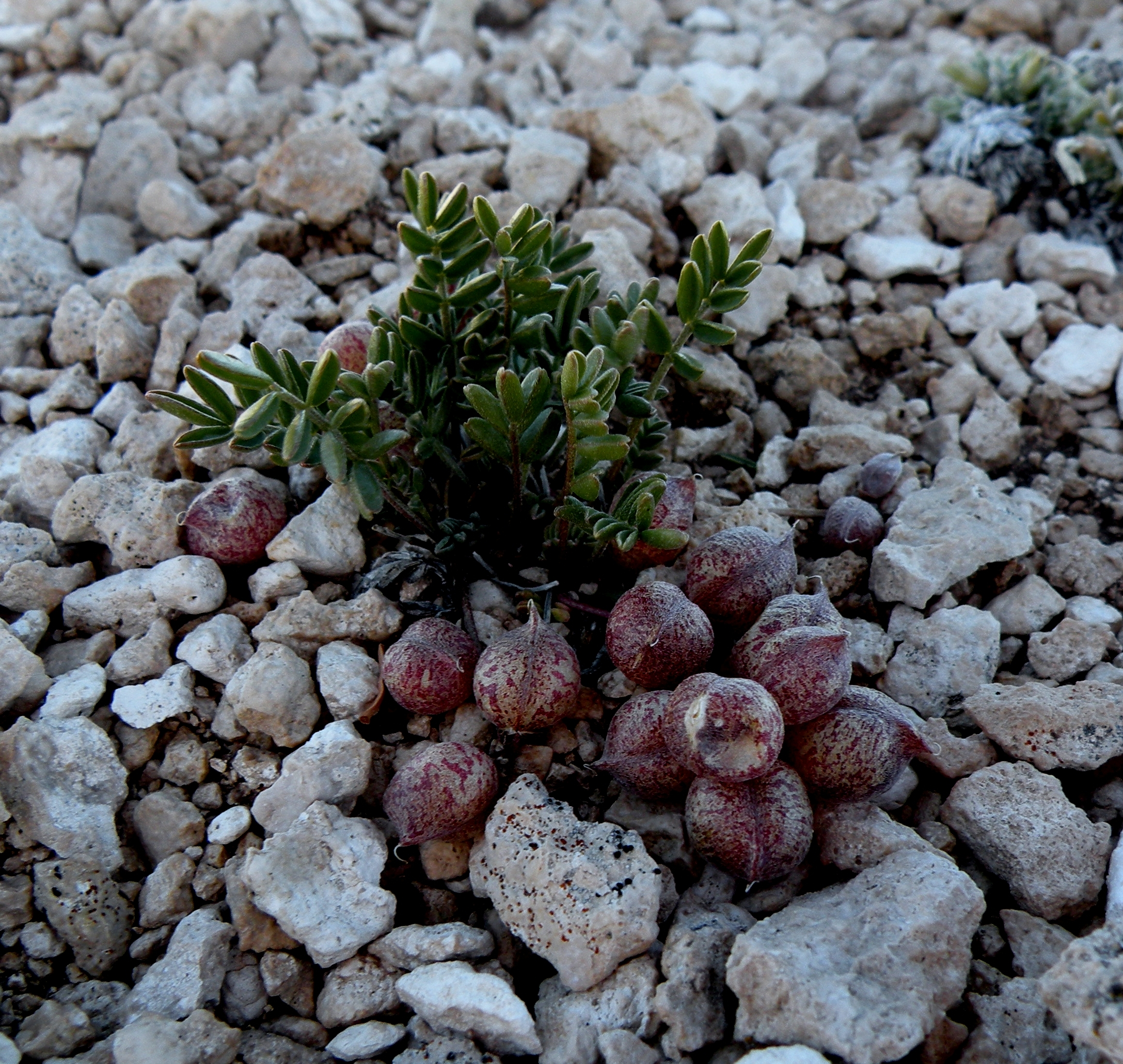

Scientific classification
- Kingdom: Plantae
- Clade: Tracheophytes
- Clade: Angiosperms
- Clade: Eudicots
- Clade: Rosids
- Order: Fabales
- Family: Fabaceae
- Subfamily: Faboideae
- Genus: Astragalus
- Species: A. limnocharis

Binomial name
- Astragalus limnocharis Barneby

= Astragalus limnocharis =

Species of plant

Astragalus limnocharis is a species of flowering plant in the family Fabaceae, endemic to Utah. It was first described by Rupert Charles Barneby in 1946.

== Subspecies ==
As of April 2023, Plants of the World Online accepted two subspecies:

- Astragalus limnocharis var. limnocharis
- Astragalus limnocharis var. montii (S.L.Welsh) Isely
