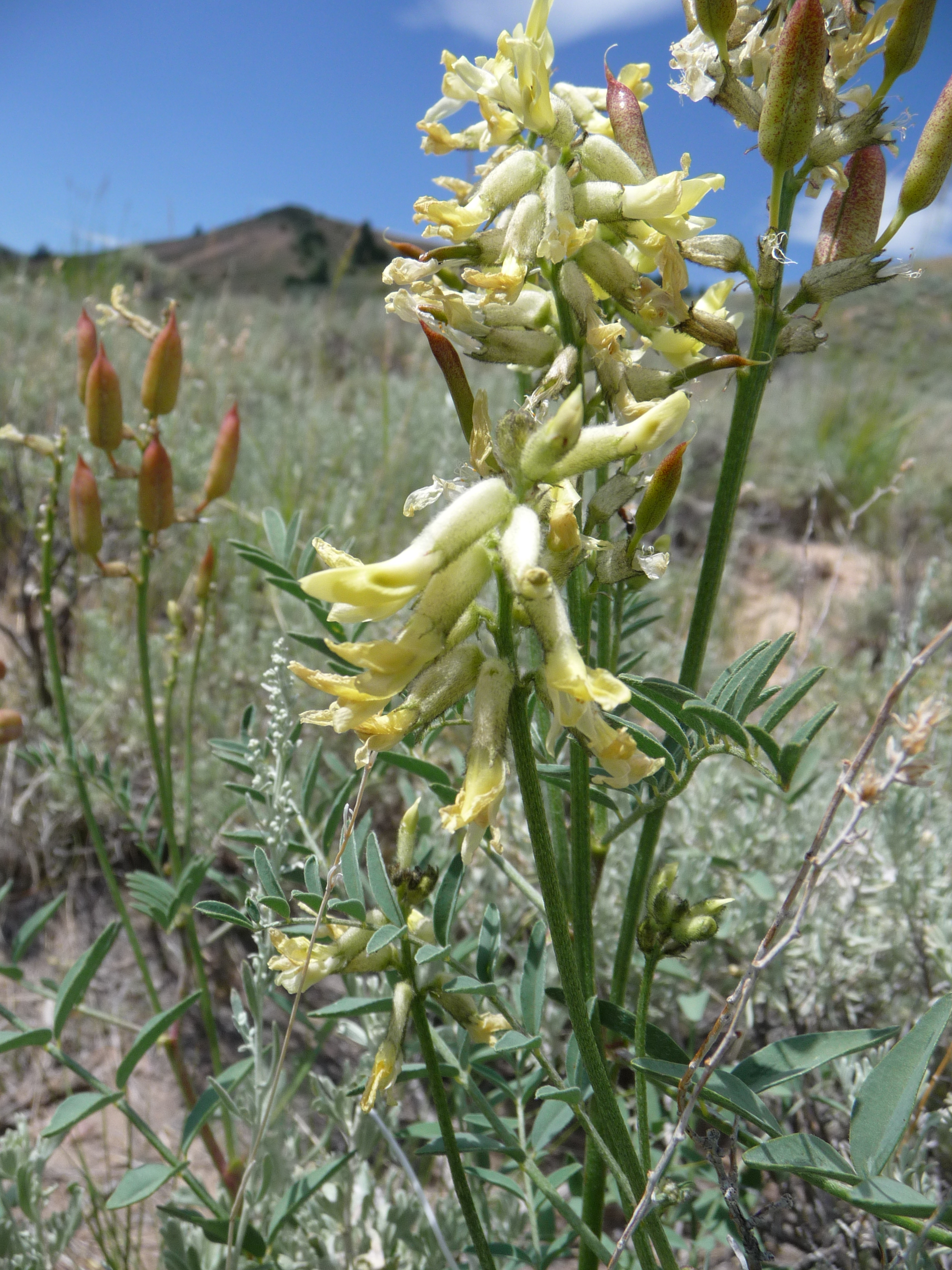

Conservation status
- Vulnerable (NatureServe)

Scientific classification
- Kingdom: Plantae
- Clade: Tracheophytes
- Clade: Angiosperms
- Clade: Eudicots
- Clade: Rosids
- Order: Fabales
- Family: Fabaceae
- Subfamily: Faboideae
- Genus: Astragalus
- Species: A. scaphoides

Binomial name
- Astragalus scaphoides (M.E. Jones) Rydb.

= Astragalus scaphoides =

Bitterroot milkvetch

Species of legume

Astragalus scaphoides, the bitterroot milkvetch, is a flowering plant in the family Fabaceae, the third-largest plant family in the world. It is found only in a small area of southwest Montana and adjacent parts of Idaho and as far west as Prineville, Oregon. It grows on shallow, south-facing slopes, in semi-arid sage scrub.

Astragalus scaphoides is a perennial herbaceous plant with pinnate leaves. The pale yellow flowers open in May and are visited by several species of bumblebees and solitary bees, including those from the genera Osmia and Anthophora.

Plants can be found near Lemhi Pass on the Montana-Idaho border, as well as Bannack State Park in Montana.

Plants tend to flower in alternate years, similar to mast years in grasses and trees.
