= Trifolium beckwithii =

Scientific classification
- Kingdom: Plantae
- Clade: Embryophytes
- Clade: Tracheophytes
- Clade: Spermatophytes
- Clade: Angiosperms
- Clade: Eudicots
- Clade: Rosids
- Order: Fabales
- Family: Fabaceae
- Subfamily: Faboideae
- Genus: Trifolium
- Species: T. beckwithii

Binomial name
- Trifolium beckwithii W.H.Brewer ex S.Watson

Species of flowering plant

Trifolium beckwithii is a species of clover known by the common name Beckwith's clover.

== Description ==
Trifolium beckwithii is a perennial herb that grows upright. It has large stipules at the base of the leaf stalks. Most of the leaves are basal, except for one pair growing higher on the stem. The leaf is made up of oval leaflets up to 4 centimeters (1 1/2 in) long.

The inflorescence is a head of flowers 2 to 3 cm (3/4 to 1 1/4 in) wide. The corolla (group of petals) is pink, purplish, or bicolored. The flowers droop on the head as they age.

== Distribution and habitat ==
It is native to the western United States, from northeastern California, Oregon, Nevada and Utah in the Great Basin region, to Montana and into South Dakota.

Habitats include yellow pine forest, red fir forest, mountain meadows, and wetland−riparian areas.
