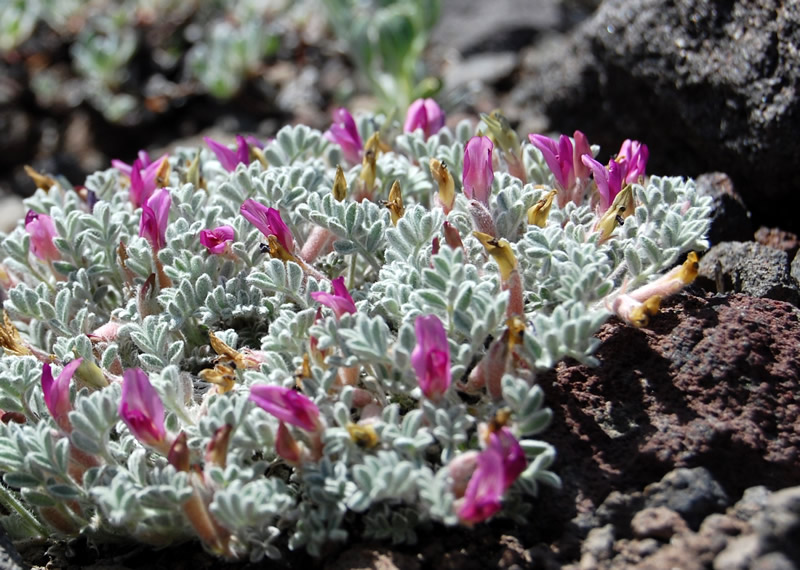
- Astragalus purshii var. tinctus. On the Thunder Mountain trail, in the Sierra Nevada, Amador County, El Dorado National Forest, California. US Forest Service photo.

Conservation status
- Secure (NatureServe)

Scientific classification
- Kingdom: Plantae
- Clade: Tracheophytes
- Clade: Angiosperms
- Clade: Eudicots
- Clade: Rosids
- Order: Fabales
- Family: Fabaceae
- Subfamily: Faboideae
- Genus: Astragalus
- Species: A. purshii

Binomial name
- Astragalus purshii Dougl. ex Hook.

= Astragalus purshii =

Species of legume

Astragalus purshii is a species of milkvetch known by the common names woollypod milkvetch and Pursh's milkvetch.

== Distribution and habitat ==
The plant is native to much of western North America, including the southwestern provinces of Canada, the northwestern United States, Nevada, and across California.

It is known from many types of habitat, including mountains and deserts. It is common along the Columbia River in arid, shrub–steppe habitat growing in shallow soils. It is a serial species preferring disturbed rocky soils.

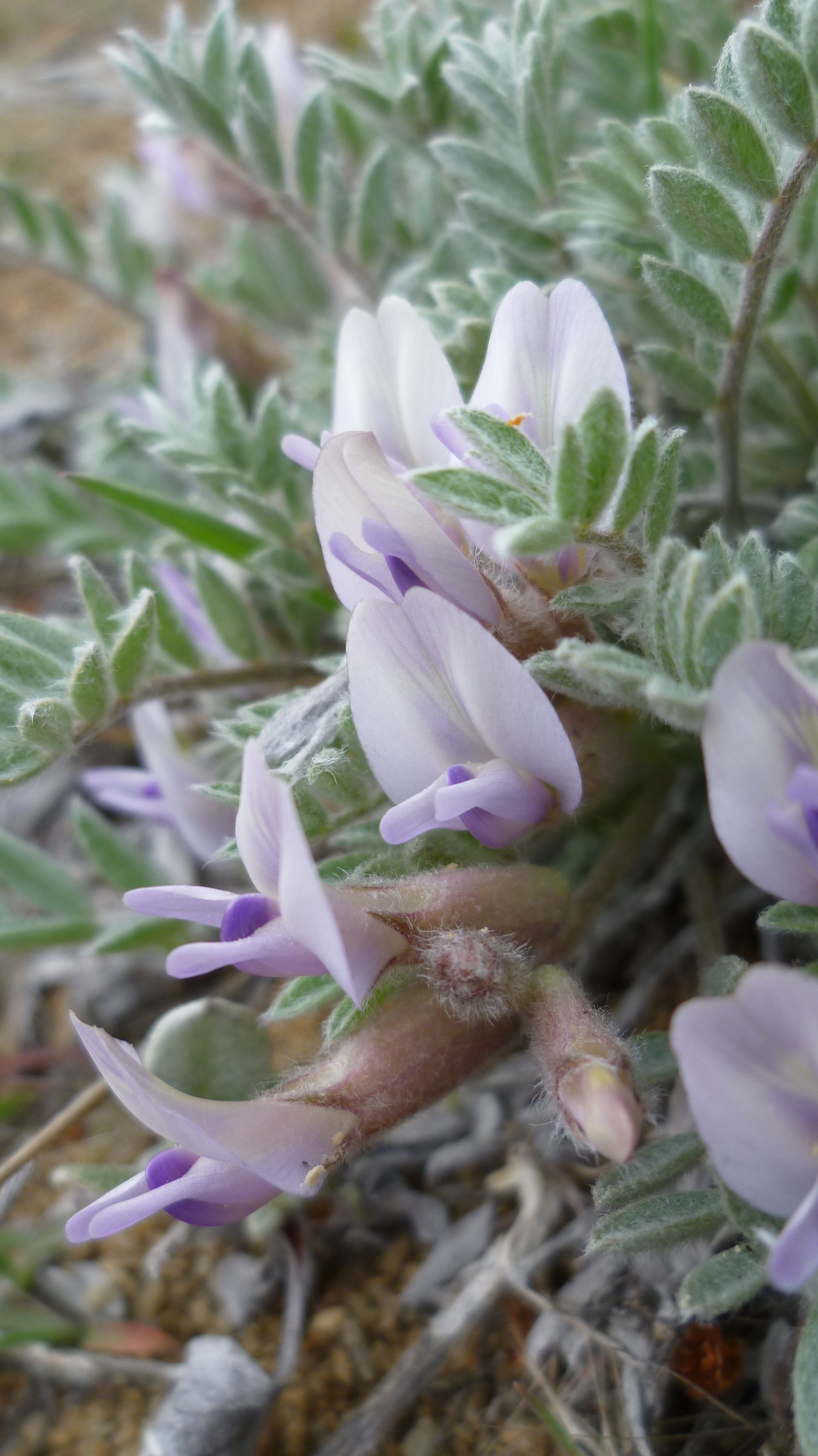
Astragalus purshii var. purshii flower closeup, one of the most common varieties on Burch Mountain, Chelan County Washington

== Description ==
Astragalus purshii is a small perennial herb forming low matts on the ground no taller than 14 centimeters and often less than 5 centimeters. The compound leaves are up to 15 centimeters long and are made up of many oppositely-arranged pairs of oval or rounded leaflets. Stems and leaflets are coated in woolly white hairs giving a silvery color to the foliage.

The inflorescence is a cluster of 1 to 11 complexly-shaped pink, rose, purple, or white flowers (depending on geographic location) each between 1 and 3 centimeters long. The flower bract is covered with long silky white hairs. The fruit is a legume pod up to 3 centimeters long which is coated densely in thick white wooly hairs resembling a small rabbits-foot or cottonball.

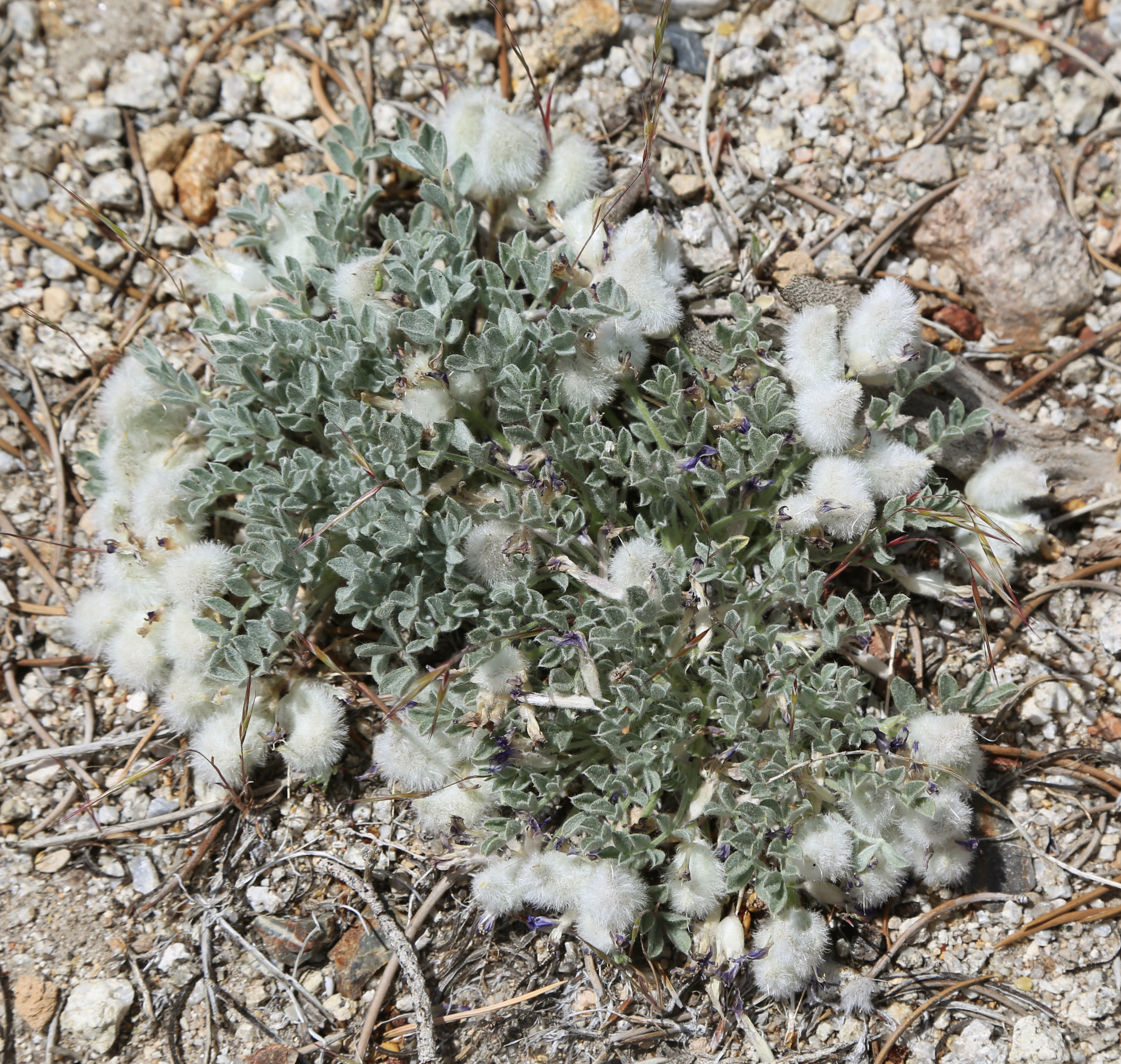
Astragalus purshii with fuzzy white seedheads, Sierra Nevada California

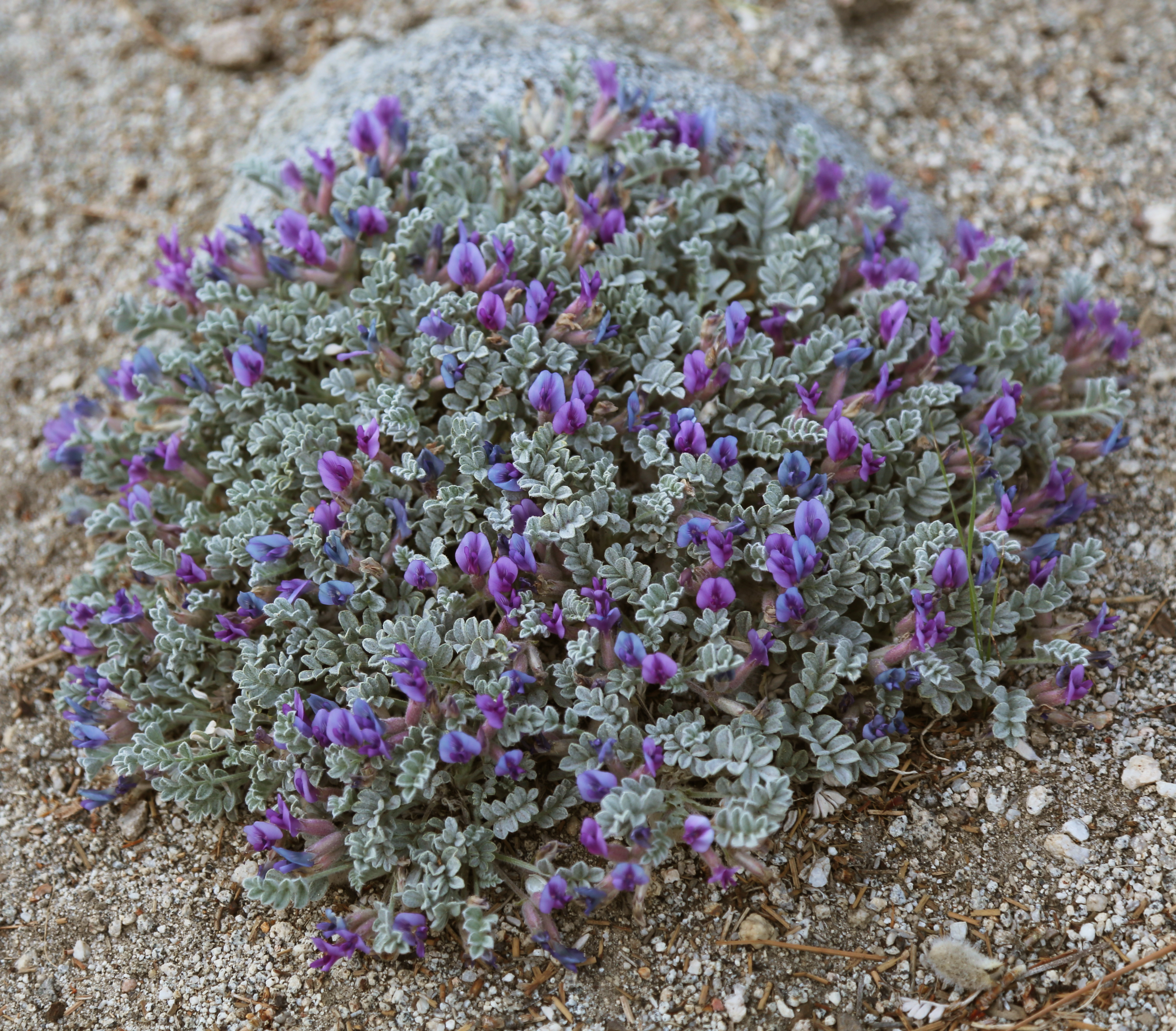
Astragalus purshii blooming in bicycle path at 6,300 ft (1,900 m), Eastern Sierra Nevada California

=== Varieties ===
There are many varieties of Astragalus purshii, including:

- A. p. var. concinnus — native to Idaho and Montana
- A. p. var. glareosus (syn. Astragalus glareosus) — found from British Columbia to Utah
- A. p. var. lagopinus — endemic to the Modoc Plateau, California
- A. p. var. lectulus — native to California and Nevada
- A. p. var. ophiogenes (Snake River milkvetch) — native to Oregon and Idaho
- A. p. var. pumilio — endemic to Nevada
- A. p. var. purshii — distributed throughout species range
- A. p. var. tinctus — found throughout the western U.S.

== Cultivation ==
Astragalus purshii is cultivated as an ornamental plant. It is an excellent rock garden plant, as a serial ephemeral species, and an addition to municipal and agency sustainable landscape and restoration projects. It is also a component for reclamation projects.

Seeds do not require stratification and are tolerant of low precipitation and drought (municipal landscaping candidate to reduce water usage). Plants are hardy to −33 °F.

== Gallery ==
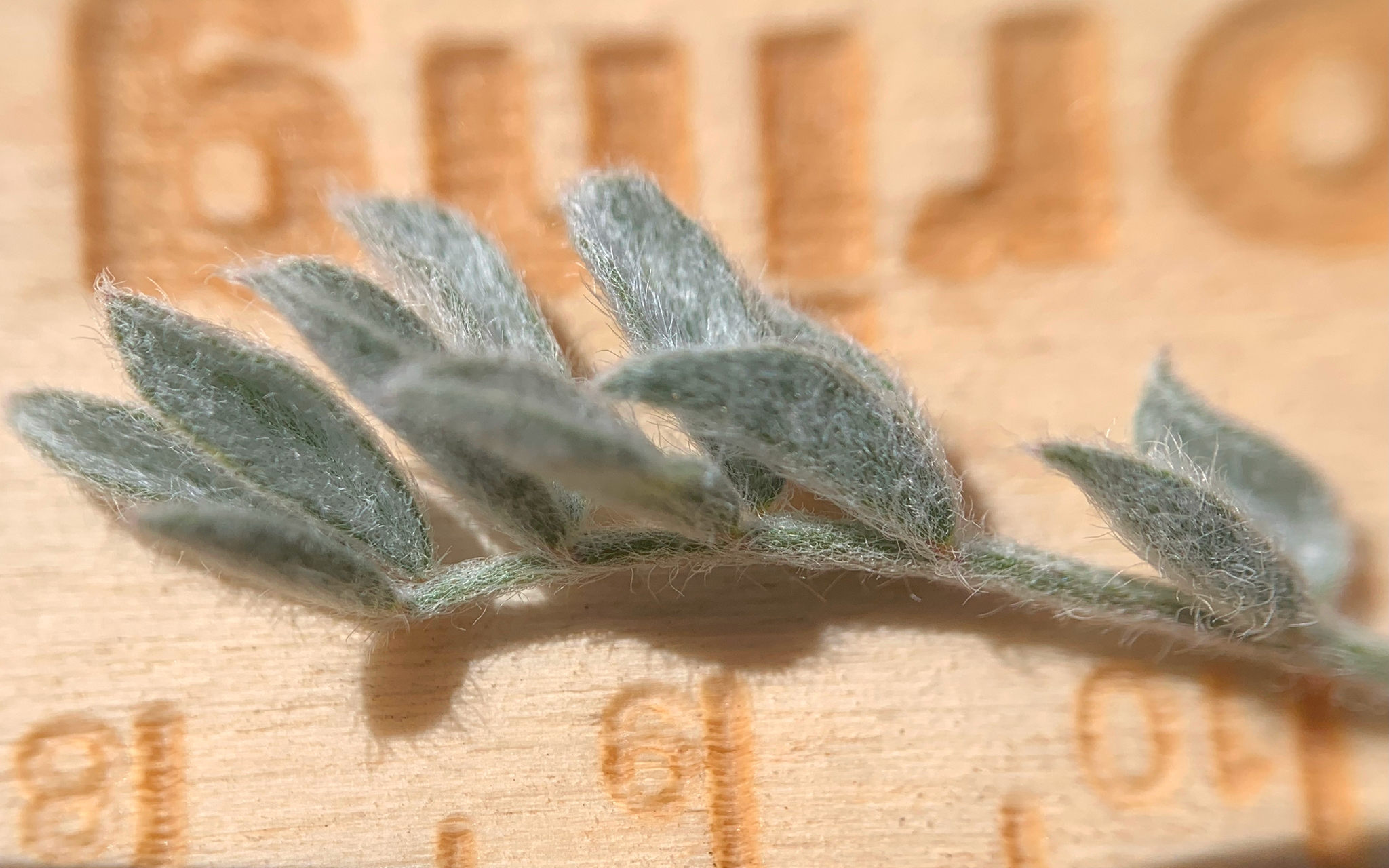
Leaf with cm ruler
