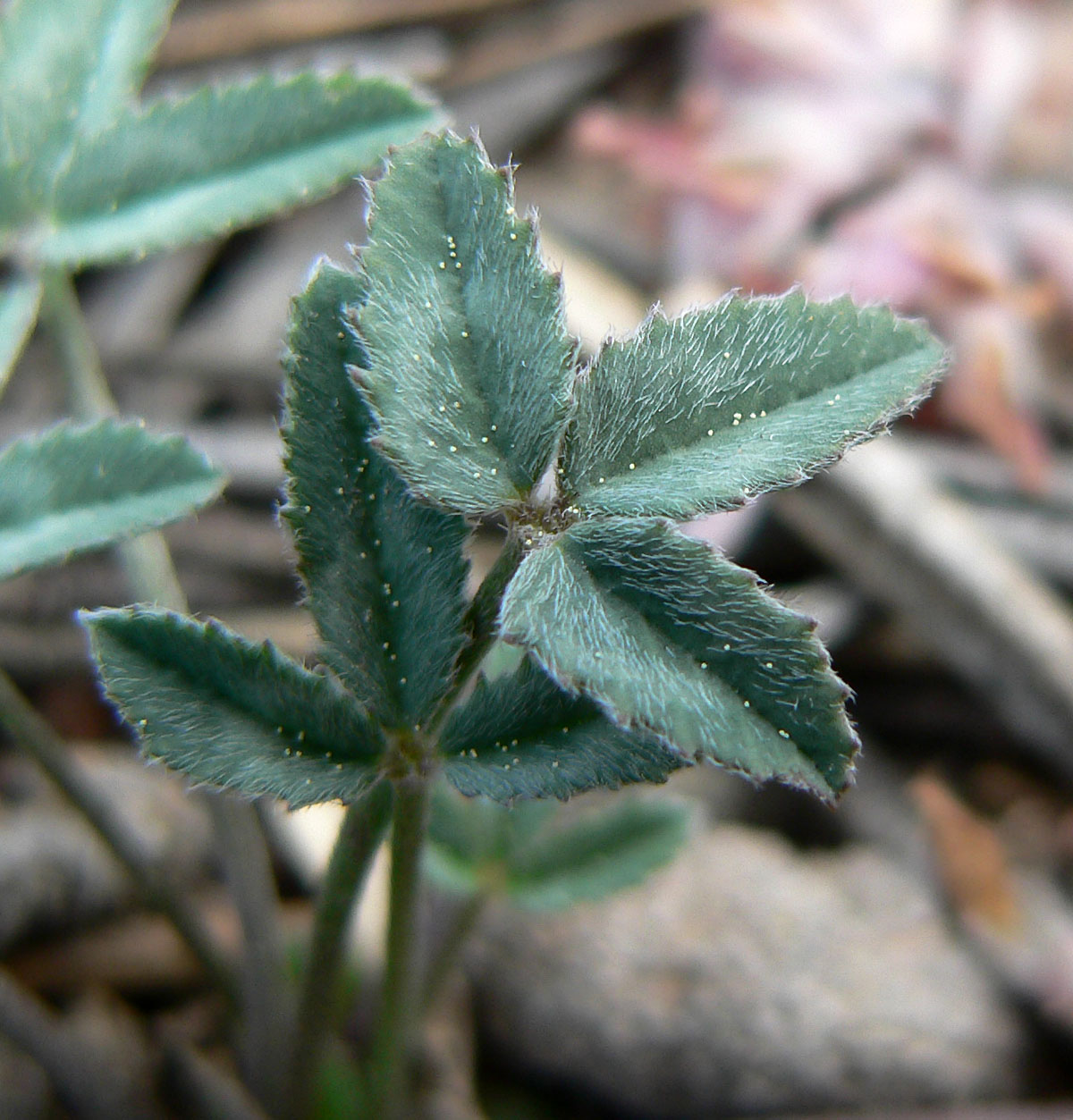
- var. plummerae

Conservation status
- Secure (NatureServe)

Scientific classification
- Kingdom: Plantae
- Clade: Tracheophytes
- Clade: Angiosperms
- Clade: Eudicots
- Clade: Rosids
- Order: Fabales
- Family: Fabaceae
- Subfamily: Faboideae
- Genus: Trifolium
- Species: T. gymnocarpon

Binomial name
- Trifolium gymnocarpon Nutt.

Synonyms
- List: Trifolium gymnocarpon subsp. plummerae (S.Watson) J.M.Gillett (1972); Trifolium gymnocarpon var. plummerae (S.Watson) J.S.Martin (1946); Trifolium gymnocarpon f. plummerae (S.Watson) McDermott (1910); Trifolium gymnocarpon var. subcaulescens (A.Gray) A.Nelson (1909); Trifolium nemorale Greene (1900); Trifolium plummerae S.Watson (1880); Trifolium plummeri Lemmon ex Lojac. (1883); Trifolium subcaulescens A.Gray (1861)

= Trifolium gymnocarpon =

Plant species in the pea family

Trifolium gymnocarpon is a species of clover known by the common name hollyleaf clover.

It is native to the western United States.

== Description ==
Trifolium gymnocarpon is a small perennial herb with stems spreading along the ground to form a flat mat or clump. The leaves are each made up of three hairy leaflets with serrated edges (though due to a relatively common genetic mutation, they may have four or five leaflets). The inflorescence is an umbel of flowers spreading out or flexing downward. The flower is roughly 1 centimeter (3/8 in) long and dull pink or brownish in color.

=== Subspecies ===
- Trifolium gymnocarpon ssp. plummerae — Plummer's clover, an Endangered species within California, but the subspecies is apparently secure, considering populations outside California.

== Distribution and habitat ==
It is native to the western United States, from California to New Mexico, and Oregon to Montana. It can be found in many types of habitat, including sagebrush scrub.
