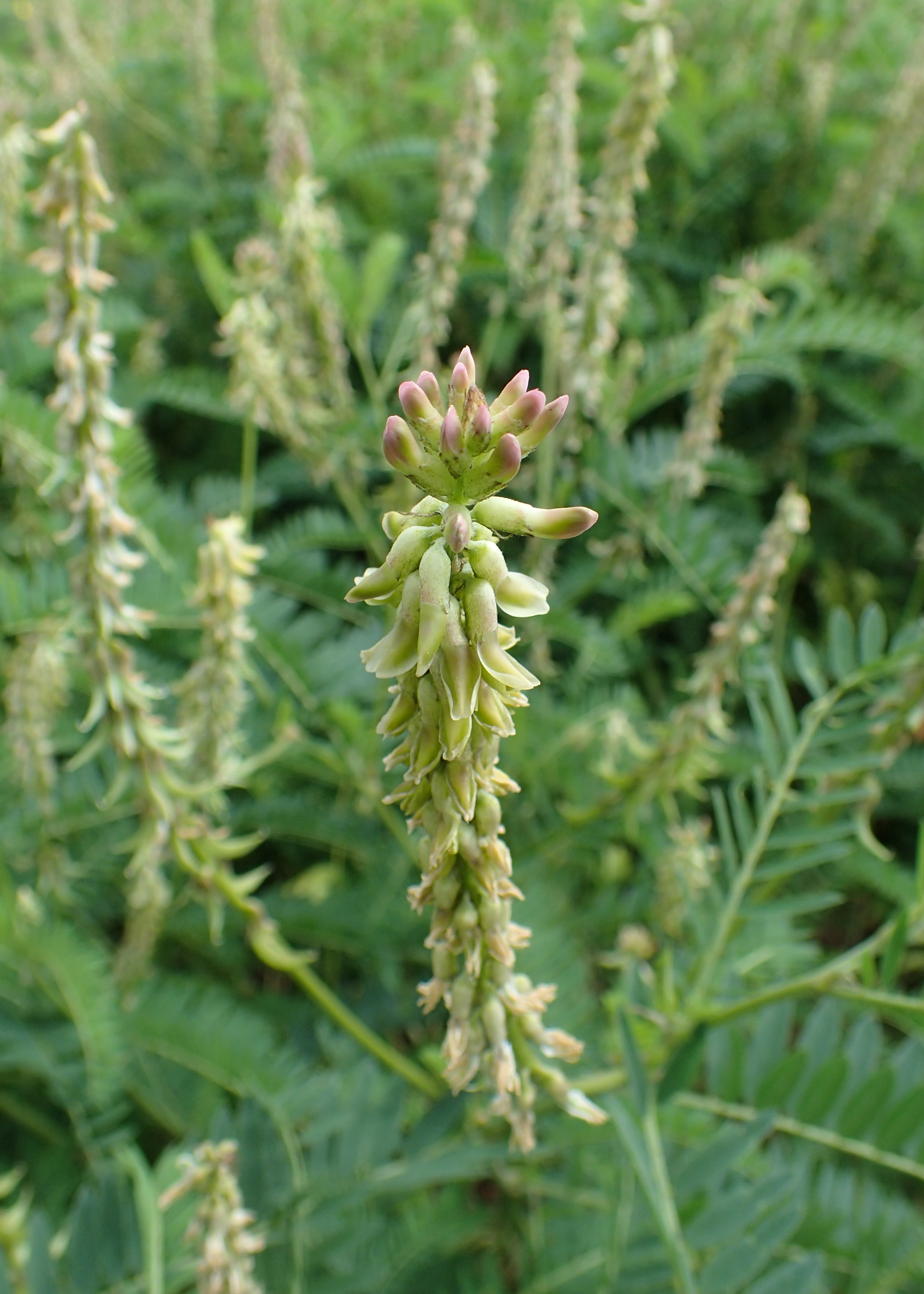

Conservation status
- Secure (NatureServe)

Scientific classification
- Kingdom: Plantae
- Clade: Tracheophytes
- Clade: Angiosperms
- Clade: Eudicots
- Clade: Rosids
- Order: Fabales
- Family: Fabaceae
- Subfamily: Faboideae
- Genus: Astragalus
- Species: A. falcatus

Binomial name
- Astragalus falcatus Lam.

Synonyms
- List: Astragalus isetensis Willd. (1809); Astragalus virescens Aiton (1789); Craccina falcata (Lam.) Steven (1856); Tragacantha falcata (Lam.) Kuntze (1891)

= Astragalus falcatus =

Species of flowering plant in the pea family

Astragalus falcatus is a species of milkvetch known by the common names Russian milkvetch, sickle milkvetch, sicklepod milkvetch, and silverleaf milkvetch. It is a flowering plant found primarily in meadows and grasslands and sometimes in open woodlands.

== Description ==
The plant has pure yellow, light yellow or creamy yellow flowers, sometimes tinged with purple. It grows 40 to 80 cm high with leaves 10 to 16 cm long which have between 8 and 20 pairs of narrow leaflets.

== Uses ==
A. falcatus has been cultivated experimentally for dryland grazing in the US and possibly in France, and was proposed as a forage crop in the USSR. However, it is one of the milkweeds containing a poisonous glycoside identified as miserotoxin.
