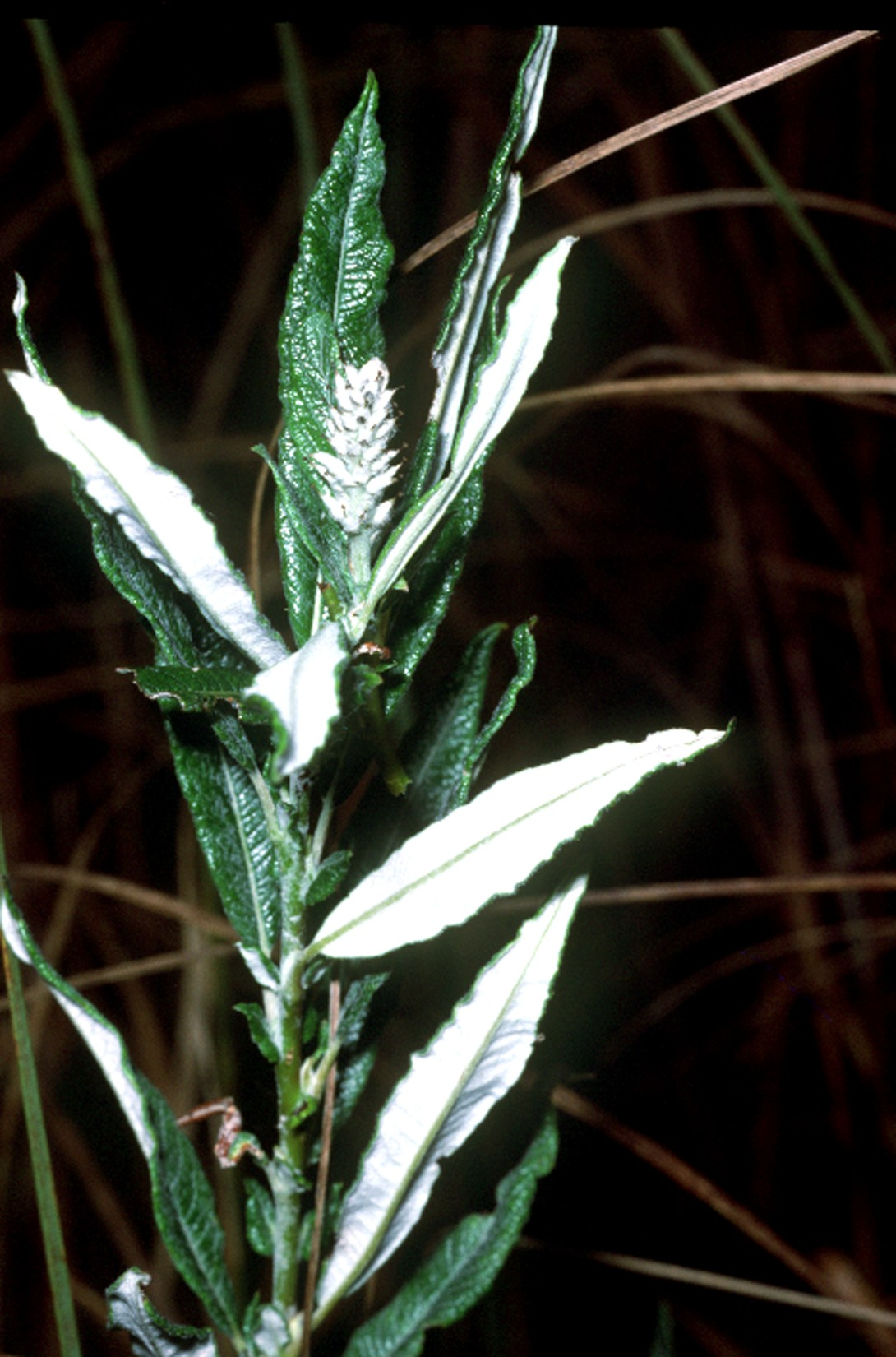

Conservation status
- Least Concern (IUCN 3.1)

Scientific classification
- Kingdom: Plantae
- Clade: Tracheophytes
- Clade: Angiosperms
- Clade: Eudicots
- Clade: Rosids
- Order: Malpighiales
- Family: Salicaceae
- Genus: Salix
- Species: S. candida

Binomial name
- Salix candida Flüggé ex Willd.

= Salix candida =

Species of shrub

Salix candida, also known as sageleaf willow, is a shrub in the Salicaceae family found in northern United States and Canada. It is 0.5 to 3.5 m tall.

== Description ==
Salix candida is a deciduous shrub. It grows in wetlands, particularly fens.

== Distribution ==
The species is native to all of Canada and North-eastern, North-central and North-western United States.
