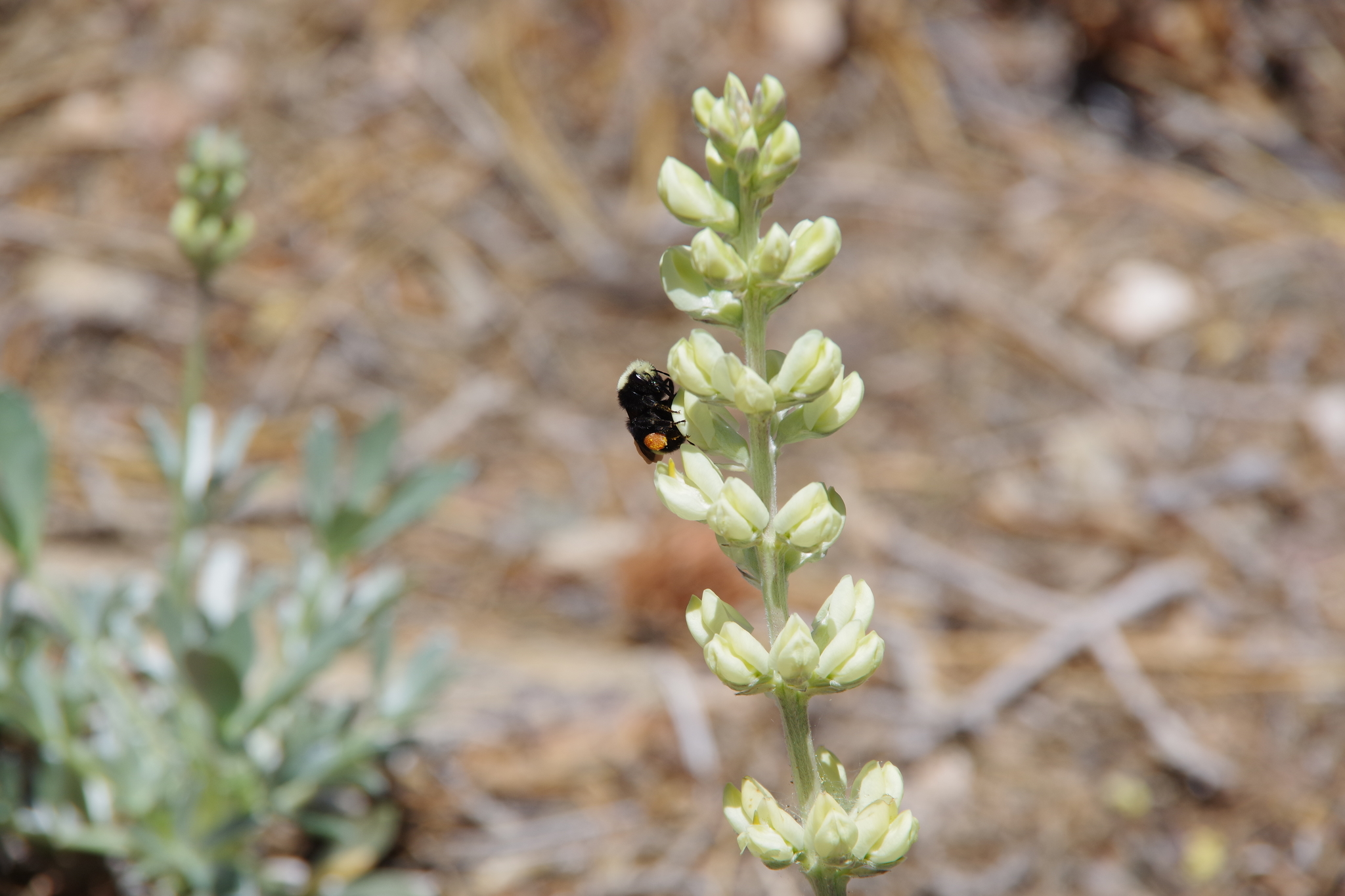

Scientific classification
- Kingdom: Plantae
- Clade: Tracheophytes
- Clade: Angiosperms
- Clade: Eudicots
- Clade: Rosids
- Order: Fabales
- Family: Fabaceae
- Subfamily: Faboideae
- Genus: Lupinus
- Species: L. peirsonii

Binomial name
- Lupinus peirsonii H.Mason

= Lupinus peirsonii =

Species of legume

Lupinus peirsonii is a rare species of lupine known by the common names Peirson's lupine and long lupine. It is endemic to the San Gabriel Mountains of Los Angeles County, California, where it grows in woodland and forest habitat. It is an erect, branching perennial herb growing 30 to 60 centimetres (12 to 24 in) tall. Each palmate leaf is made up of five to eight fleshy leaflets up to seven centimetres (2.8 in) long. The herbage is coated in silvery silky hairs. The inflorescence is a raceme of whorled yellow flowers each about a centimeter in length. The fruit is a silky-haired legume pod three or four centimetres (1.2 or 1.6 in) long.
