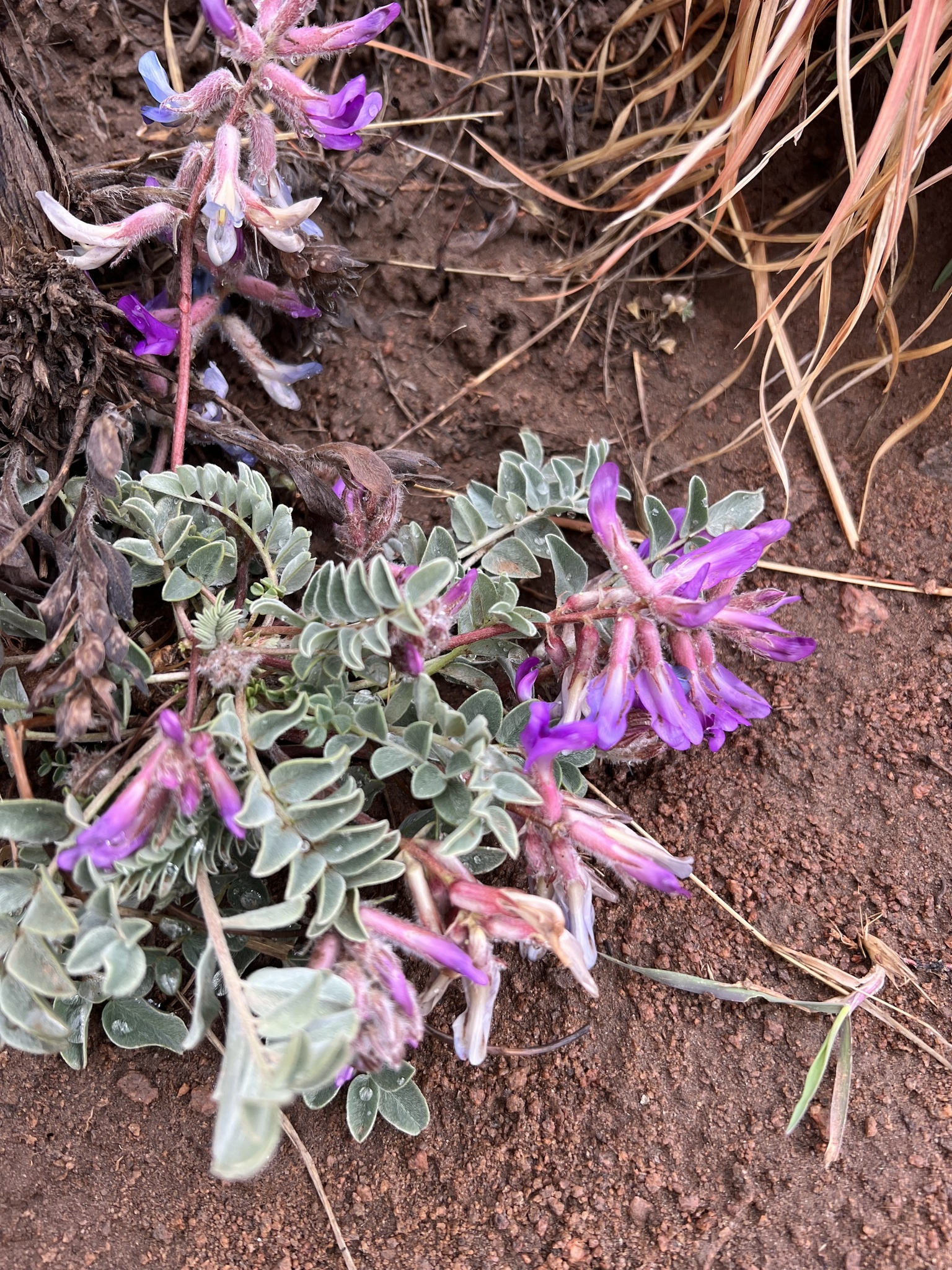

Conservation status
- Apparently Secure (NatureServe)

Scientific classification
- Kingdom: Plantae
- Clade: Tracheophytes
- Clade: Angiosperms
- Clade: Eudicots
- Clade: Rosids
- Order: Fabales
- Family: Fabaceae
- Subfamily: Faboideae
- Genus: Astragalus
- Species: A. shortianus

Binomial name
- Astragalus shortianus Nutt.

Synonyms
- Astragalus humilis Geyer ex Hook.; Astragalus shortianus var. typicus Barneby; Tragacantha shortiana (Nutt.) Kuntze; Xylophacos shortianus (Nutt.) Rydb.

= Astragalus shortianus =

Species of plant

Astragalus shortianus, the early purple milkvetch, is a species of flowering plant in the family Fabaceae. It is native to the west-central United States; Wyoming, Colorado, Nebraska, and New Mexico. A perennial flowering from April through July, it is found growing in dry, rocky soils at elevations from 5,200 to 9,000 ft (1,600 to 2,700 m).
