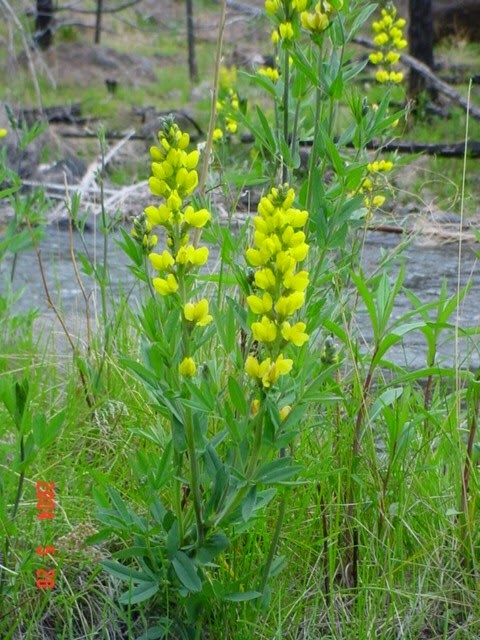

Conservation status
- Apparently Secure (NatureServe)

Scientific classification
- Kingdom: Plantae
- Clade: Embryophytes
- Clade: Tracheophytes
- Clade: Spermatophytes
- Clade: Angiosperms
- Clade: Eudicots
- Clade: Rosids
- Order: Fabales
- Family: Fabaceae
- Subfamily: Faboideae
- Genus: Thermopsis
- Species: T. montana

Binomial name
- Thermopsis montana Nutt.

Varieties
- Thermopsis montana var. montana; Thermopsis montana var. ovata (B.L.Rob. ex Piper) H.St.John

Synonyms
- List: Thermopsis fabacea var. montana (Nutt.) A.Gray (1863); Thermopsis rhombifolia var. montana (Nutt.) Isely (1978)

= Thermopsis montana =

Plant species in the pea family

Thermopsis montana, the false lupin, mountain goldenbanner, golden pea, mountain thermopsis, or revonpapu, is a plant species which is native to the western United States. The Latin specific epithet montana refers to mountains or coming from mountains.

== Description ==
Thermopsis montana is a perennial herb. The flowers are golden-yellow, growing in dense but elongate racemes on leafy stems which can grow up to about 3 feet (0.91 m) in height. Flowers bloom May to August. The leaves grow in triplicate formations.

The plant grows densely in meadows and in moist areas of the high plains, sometimes in association with sagebrush.

== Cultivation ==
It is used as a medicinal plant, and as an ornamental plant in gardens. It is suspected of being poisonous. It is avoided by livestock.
