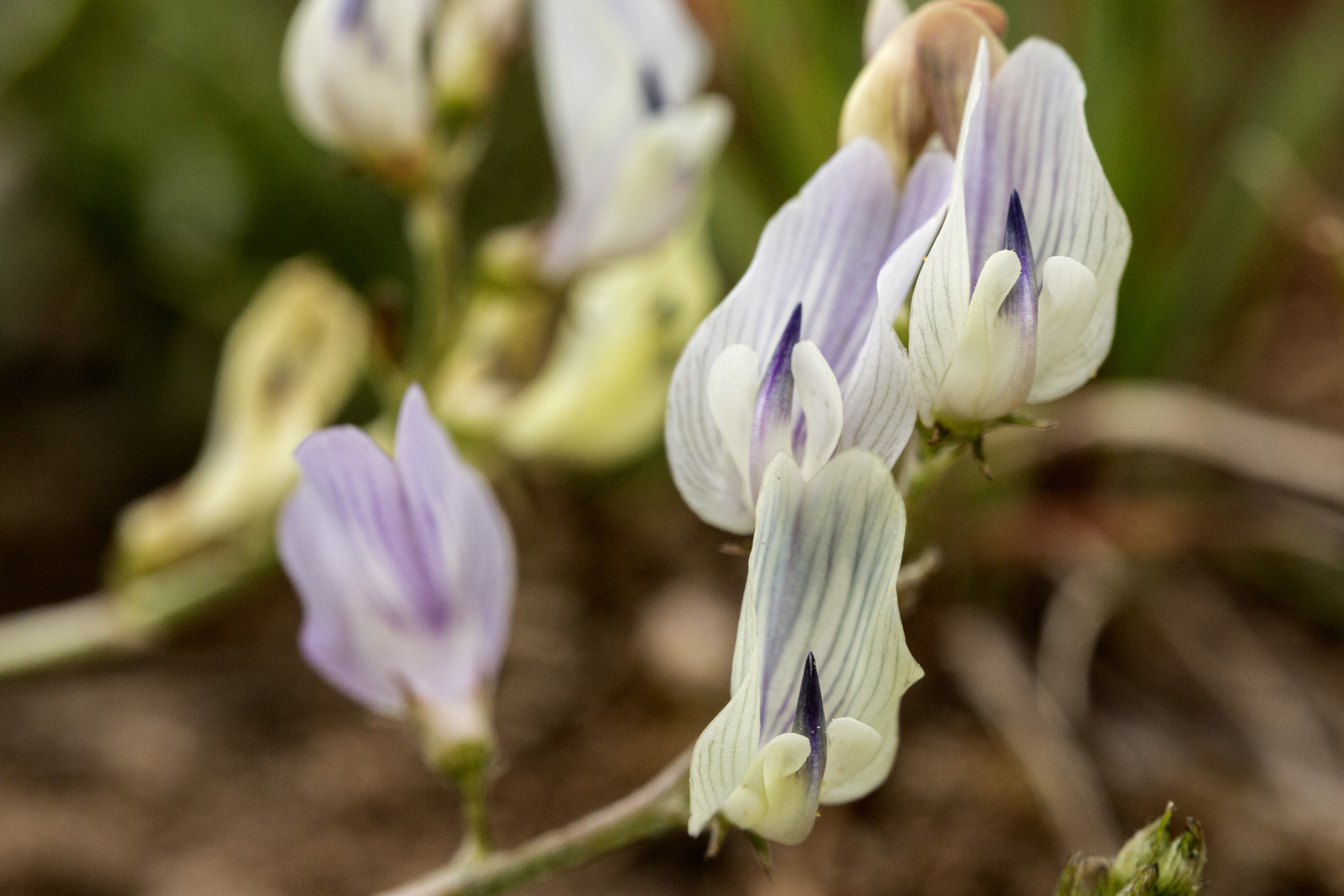
- Close-up of flowers
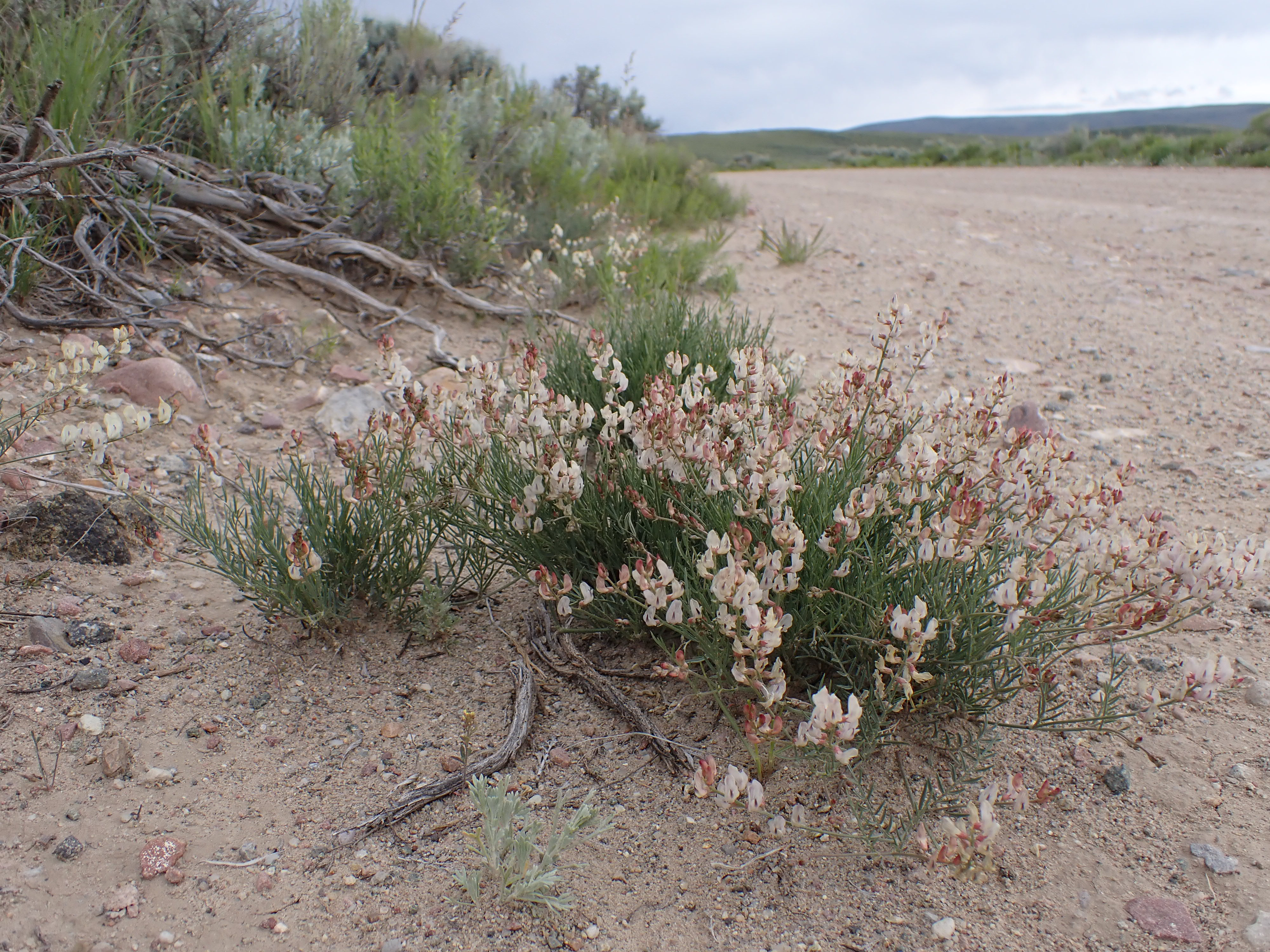
- Habit

Conservation status
- Least Concern (IUCN 3.1)

- Secure (NatureServe)

Scientific classification
- Kingdom: Plantae
- Clade: Tracheophytes
- Clade: Angiosperms
- Clade: Eudicots
- Clade: Rosids
- Order: Fabales
- Family: Fabaceae
- Subfamily: Faboideae
- Genus: Astragalus
- Species: A. miser

Binomial name
- Astragalus miser Douglas ex Hook.

Synonyms
- List: Astragalus campestris var. crispatus M.E.Jones; Astragalus campestris var. hylophilus (Rydb.) M.E.Jones; Astragalus campestris var. serotinus (A.Gray ex E.Cooper) M.E.Jones; Astragalus carltonii J.F.Macbr.; Astragalus convallarius var. hylophilus (Rydb.) Tidestr.; Astragalus decumbens (Nutt.) A.Gray; Astragalus decumbens var. crispatus (M.E.Jones) Barneby; Astragalus decumbens var. decurrens (Rydb.) Cronquist; Astragalus decumbens var. oblongifolius (Rydb.) Cronquist; Astragalus decumbens var. serotinus (A.Gray ex E.Cooper) M.E.Jones; Astragalus divergens Blank.; Astragalus garrettii J.F.Macbr.; Astragalus griseopubescens E.Sheld.; Astragalus hylophilus (Rydb.) A.Nelson; Astragalus hylophilus var. oblongifolius (Rydb.) J.F.Macbr.; Astragalus hypoglottis var. strigosus Kellogg; Astragalus miser var. decurrens (Rydb.) Cronquist; Astragalus palliseri A.Gray; Astragalus rydbergii J.F.Macbr.; Astragalus serotinus A.Gray ex E.Cooper; Astragalus serotinus var. palliseri (A.Gray) J.F.Macbr.; Astragalus serotinus var. strigosus (Kellogg) J.F.Macbr.; Astragalus strigosus (Kellogg) J.M.Coult. & Fisher; Homalobus camporum Rydb.; Homalobus decumbens Nutt.; Homalobus decurrens Rydb.; Homalobus divergens (Blank.) Rydb.; Homalobus hitchcockii Rydb.; Homalobus humilis Rydb.; Homalobus hylophilus Rydb.; Homalobus microcarpus Rydb.; Homalobus miser (Douglas ex Hook.) Rydb.; Homalobus oblongifolius Rydb.; Homalobus palliseri (A.Gray) Rydb.; Homalobus paucijugus Rydb.; Homalobus serotinus (A.Gray ex E.Cooper) Rydb.; Homalobus strigosus (Kellogg) Rydb.; Homalobus tenuifolius Nutt.; Phaca decumbens (Nutt.) Piper; Phaca misera (Douglas ex Hook.) Piper; Phaca serotina (A.Gray ex E.Cooper) Piper; Tium miserum (Douglas ex Hook.) Rydb.; Tragacantha decumbens (Nutt.) Kuntze; Tragacantha misera (Douglas ex Hook.) Kuntze; Tragacantha palliseri (A.Gray) Kuntze; Tragacantha serotina (A.Gray ex E.Cooper) Kuntze

= Astragalus miser =

Species of plant

Astragalus miser, the timber milkvetch, is a species of flowering plant in the family Fabaceae. A perennial, it is native to western North America, except California. One of the locoweeds toxic to livestock, it contains miserotoxin.

The Sylix/Okanagan use timber milkvetch blooming as a sign that the edible cambium and inner bark of the lodgepole pine is ready to harvest.

== Subtaxa ==
The following varieties are accepted:

- Astragalus miser var. crispatus (M.E.Jones) Cronquist – Idaho, Montana
- Astragalus miser var. decumbens (Nutt.) Cronquist – Montana, Wyoming
- Astragalus miser var. hylophilus (Rydb.) Barneby – Idaho, Montana, Wyoming, South Dakota
- Astragalus miser var. miser – British Columbia, Washington, Oregon, Idaho, Montana
- Astragalus miser var. oblongifolius (Rydb.) Cronquist – Idaho, Nevada, Utah, Arizona, Wyoming, Colorado, New Mexico
- Astragalus miser var. praeteritus Barneby – Idaho, Montana, Wyoming
- Astragalus miser var. serotinus (A.Gray ex E.Cooper) Barneby – Washington, Oregon, Idaho, Montana
- Astragalus miser var. tenuifolius (Nutt.) Barneby – Idaho, Nevada, Utah, Wyoming
