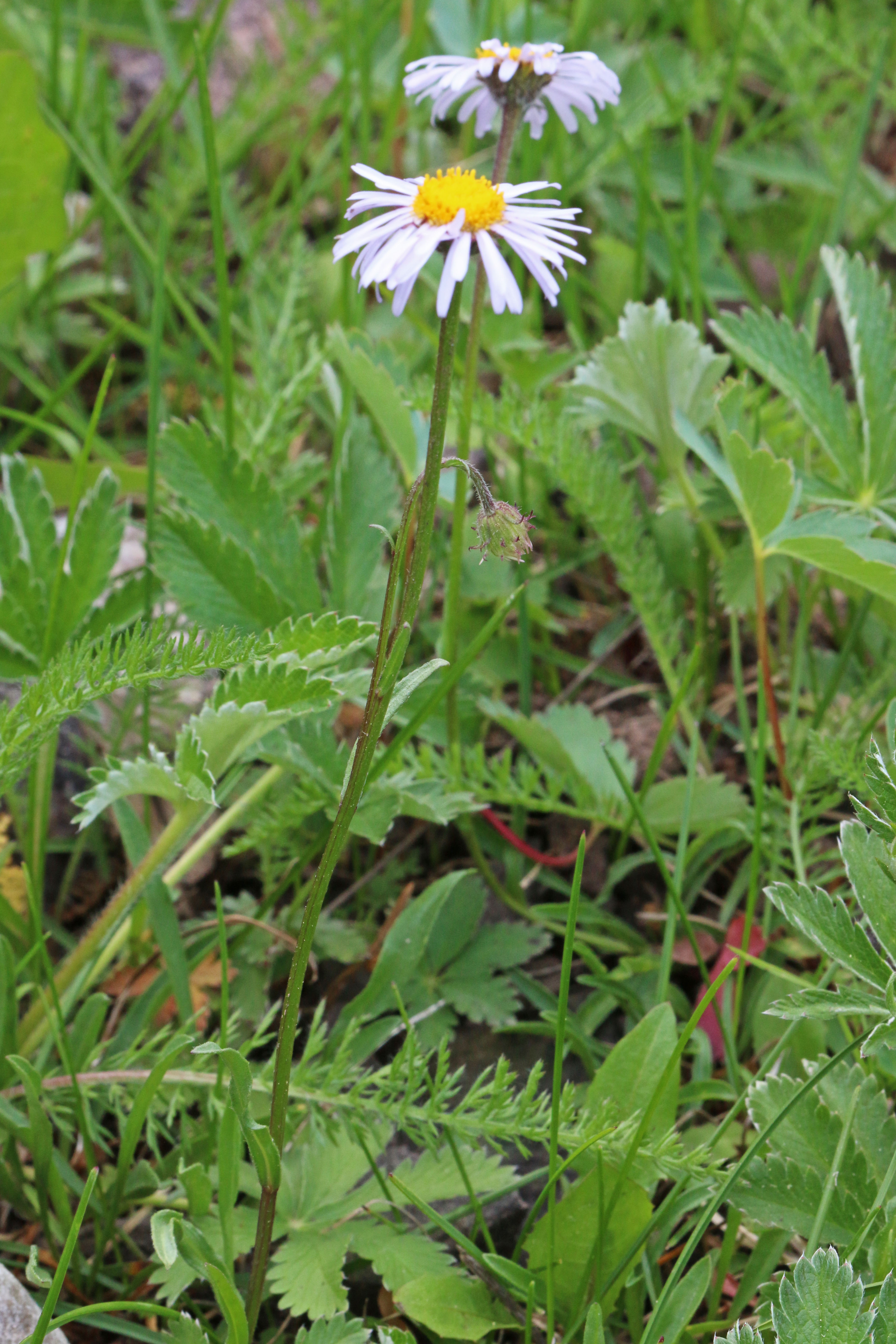

Conservation status
- Apparently Secure (NatureServe)

Scientific classification
- Kingdom: Plantae
- Clade: Tracheophytes
- Clade: Angiosperms
- Clade: Eudicots
- Clade: Asterids
- Order: Asterales
- Family: Asteraceae
- Genus: Erigeron
- Species: E. ursinus

Binomial name
- Erigeron ursinus S.L.Welsh & Goodrich 1983

Synonyms
- Erigeron ursinum D.C.Eaton

= Erigeron ursinus =

Species of flowering plant

Erigeron ursinus is a North American species of flowering plant in the family Asteraceae known by the common name Bear River fleabane. It is native to the western United States, from Montana and Idaho south as far as Arizona and New Mexico.

Erigeron ursinus grows in sunny locations in sagebrush and in open coniferous woodlands. It is a small perennial herb rarely more than 8 centimeters (3.2 inches) tall, producing rhizomes and a branching underground caudex. The inflorescence is made up of only one flower heads per stem. Each head contains 14–30 white, pink, or purple ray florets surrounding numerous yellow disc florets.
