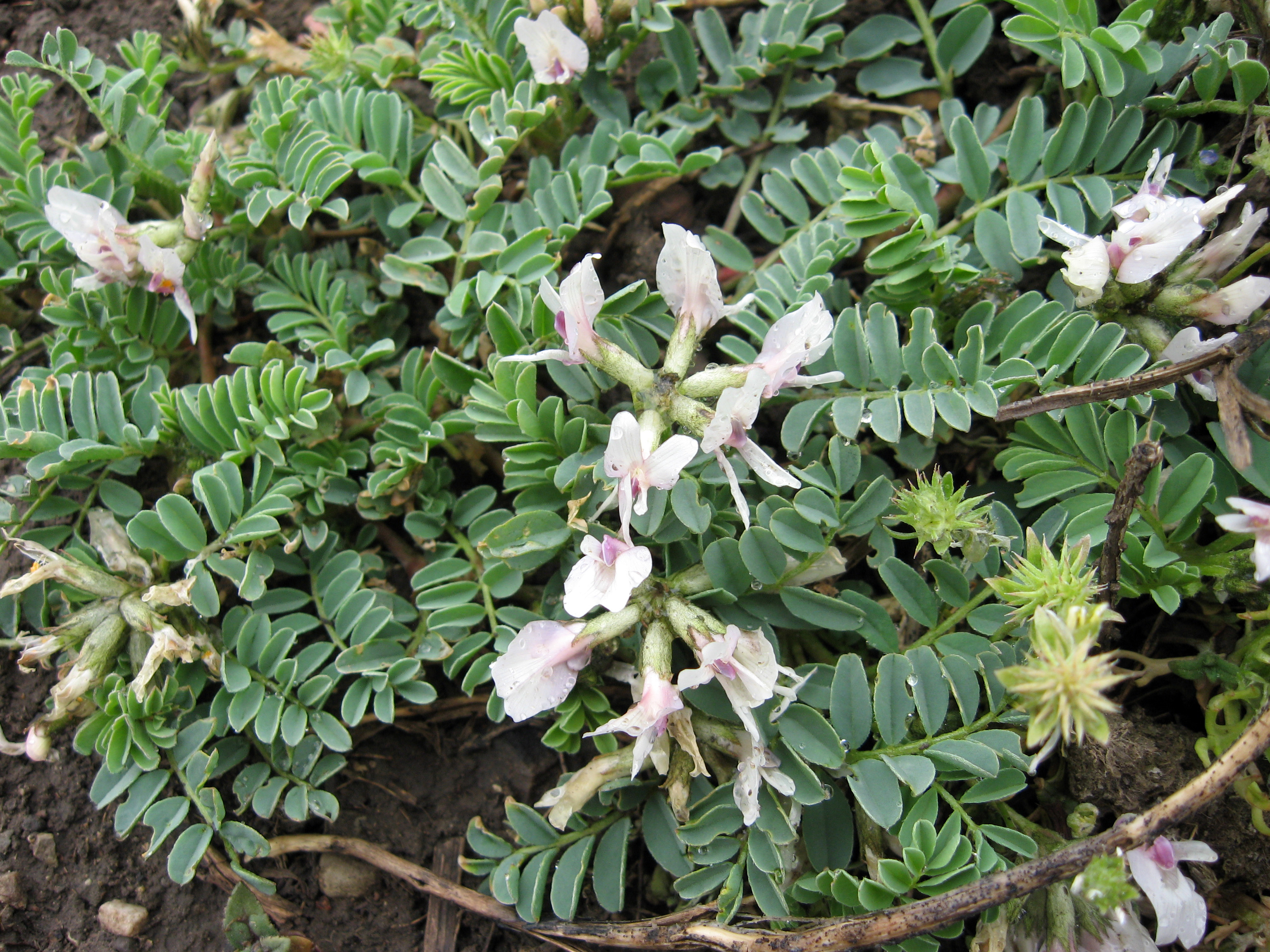

Conservation status
- Apparently Secure (NatureServe)

Scientific classification
- Kingdom: Plantae
- Clade: Tracheophytes
- Clade: Angiosperms
- Clade: Eudicots
- Clade: Rosids
- Order: Fabales
- Family: Fabaceae
- Subfamily: Faboideae
- Genus: Astragalus
- Species: A. cibarius

Binomial name
- Astragalus cibarius Sheldon

= Astragalus cibarius =

Species of legume

Astragalus cibarius, commonly called the browse milkvetch, is a species of plant in the legume family.

It is native to western North America, in the U.S. states of Colorado, Idaho, Montana, Nevada, Utah, and Wyoming. It is a widespread and common species, found in valley floors, plains, and foothills. It is particularly associated with sagebrush, which it often grows under.

It is a perennial that produces pink-purple and white colored flowers in the spring.
