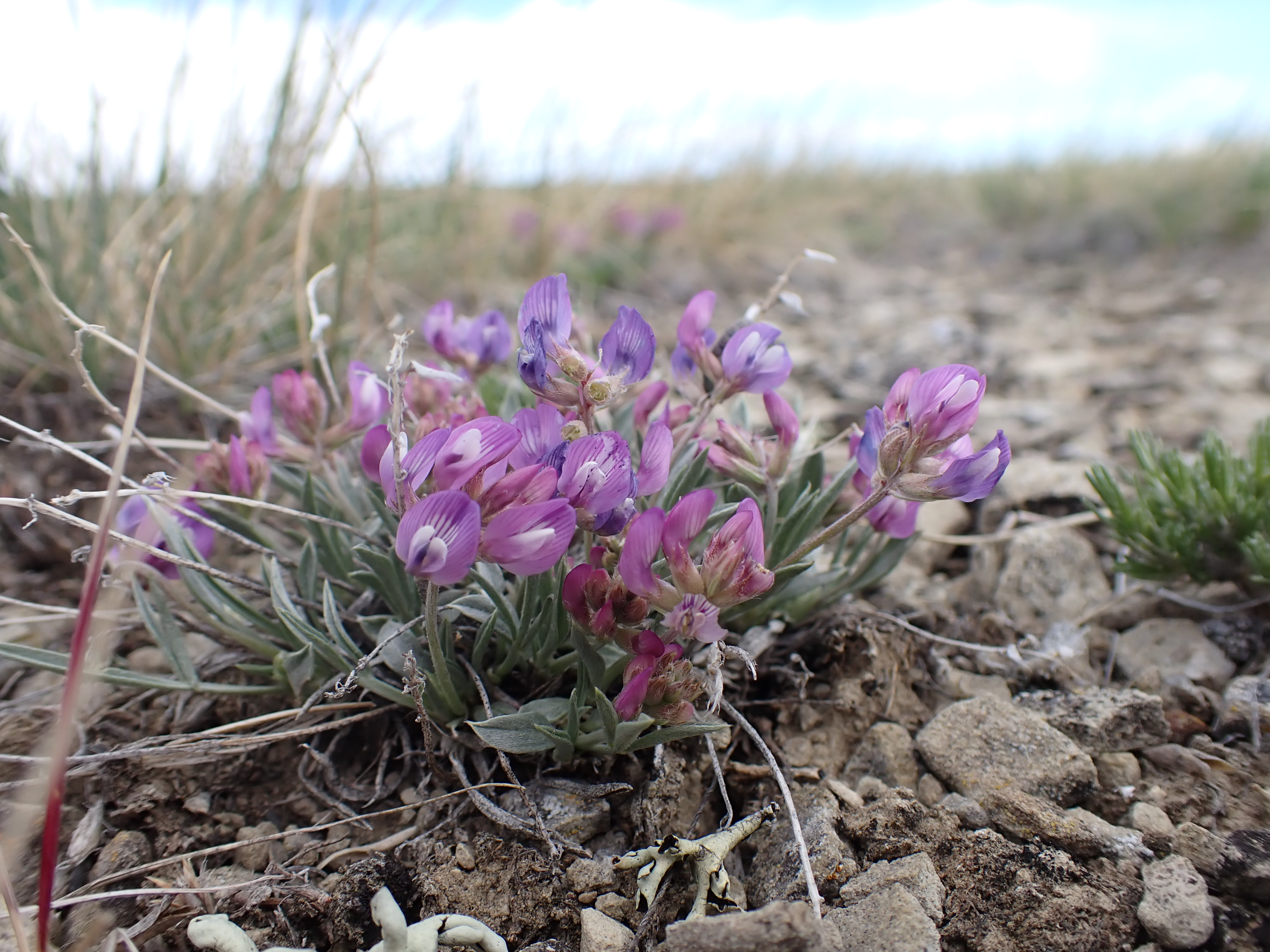

Conservation status
- Secure (NatureServe)

Scientific classification
- Kingdom: Plantae
- Clade: Tracheophytes
- Clade: Angiosperms
- Clade: Eudicots
- Clade: Rosids
- Order: Fabales
- Family: Fabaceae
- Subfamily: Faboideae
- Genus: Astragalus
- Species: A. spatulatus

Binomial name
- Astragalus spatulatus E.Sheld.

Synonyms
- List: Astragalus caespitosus; Astragalus simplicifolius var. caespitosus; Astragalus simplicifolius var. spatulatus; Astragalus spatulatus var. typicus; Homalobus caespitosus; Tragacantha caespitosa

= Astragalus spatulatus =

Plant species in the pea family

Astragalus spatulatus is a plant in the milkvetch genus in the legume family and it is commonly referred to as tufted milkvetch and draba milkvetch. This plant was previously named Homalobus caespitosus by J. Torrey and A. Gray in 1838, however, it was reclassified into a new genus and then renamed in 1894 by E. Sheldon.

== Description ==
Small perennial plant forming dense tufts (1.5–9 (–12) cm), with short stems up to 1.5 cm long. Leaves are simple, oblanceolate, and alternate on the stems, measuring 1–3 cm. Produces purple flowers in May and June, which develop into erect, strigose legumes containing 4–12 seeds. Possesses a taproot that helps anchor the plant in the soil.

== Taxonomy ==
Astragalus spatulatus was scientifically described and named by Edmund Perry Sheldon in 1894. It is classified as a member of the genus Astragalus in the family Fabaceae. It has no accepted varieties, but has two in its thirteen synonyms.

Table of Synonyms
Name	Year	Rank	Notes
Astragalus caespitosus (Nutt.) A.Gray	1864	species	≡ hom., nom. illeg.
Astragalus simplex Tidestr.	1925	species	= het.
Astragalus simplicifolius var. caespitosus (Nutt.) M.E.Jones	1895	variety	≡ hom.
Astragalus simplicifolius var. spatulatus (E.Sheld.) M.E.Jones	1902	variety	≡ hom.
Astragalus spatulatus var. simplex Tidestr.	1937	variety	= het.
Astragalus spatulatus var. typicus Barneby	1947	variety	≡ hom., not validly publ.
Astragalus spatulatus var. uniflorus (Rydb.) Barneby	1947	variety	= het.
Homalobus brachycarpus Nutt.	1838	species	= het.
Homalobus caespitosus Nutt.	1838	species	≡ hom.
Homalobus canescens Nutt.	1838	species	= het.
Homalobus uniflorus Rydb.	1907	species	= het.
Phaca brachycarpa Britton	1894	species	= het., nom. illeg.
Tragacantha caespitosa (Nutt.) Kuntze	1891	species	≡ hom.
Notes: ≡ homotypic synonym; = heterotypic synonym

== Distribution and habitat ==
Astragalus spatulatus has as widely distributed from Alberta and Saskatchewan in Canada and in central and western United states including Colorado, Idaho, Kansas, Montana, North Dakota, Nebraska, South Dakota, Utah, and Wyoming.

This plant grows in a wide variety of habitat typical in between 600–2700 m elevation. Astragalus spatulatus can be found in open areas such as grassland and prairies and in mountain brush communities, such as sage brush and pinyon-juniper.

== Ecology ==
Pollinated by various species of bumble bees (Bombus spp.).

== Uses ==
No known herbal uses.
