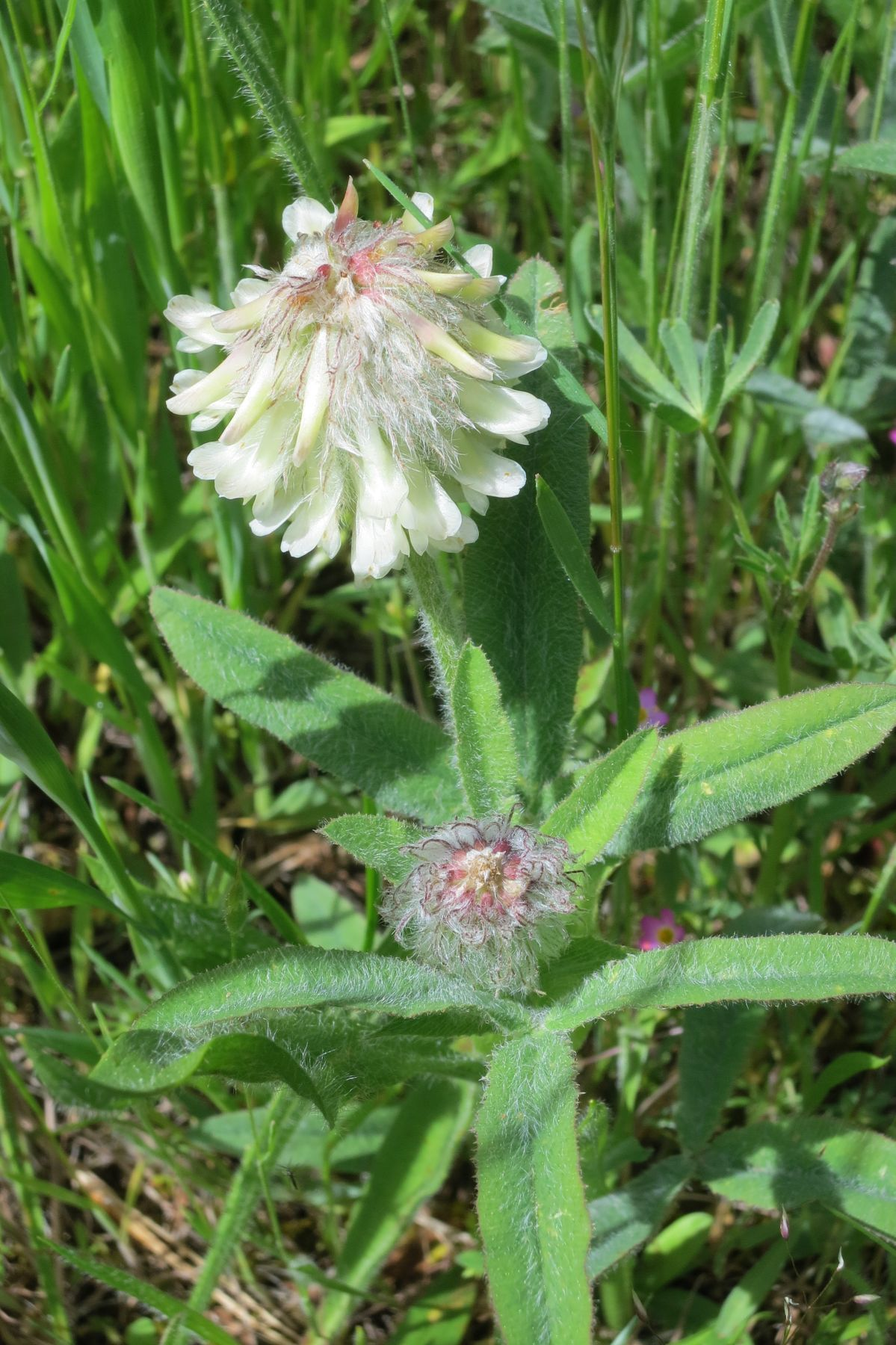

Scientific classification
- Kingdom: Plantae
- Clade: Embryophytes
- Clade: Tracheophytes
- Clade: Spermatophytes
- Clade: Angiosperms
- Clade: Eudicots
- Clade: Rosids
- Order: Fabales
- Family: Fabaceae
- Subfamily: Faboideae
- Genus: Trifolium
- Species: T. eriocephalum

Binomial name
- Trifolium eriocephalum Nutt.

= Trifolium eriocephalum =

Species of flowering plant

Trifolium eriocephalum is a species of clover known by the common name woollyhead clover or hairy head clover.

== Description ==
Trifolium eriocephalum is a hairy perennial herb producing an upright, unbranched stem. The leaves are made up of oval leaflets up to 4 centimeters (1 1/2 in) long.

The inflorescence is a head of flowers up to 3 cm (1 1/4 in) long with flowers spreading and soon drooping. The flower has a densely hairy, tubular calyx of sepals with long, narrow linear lobes that may bend outward. The white or yellowish corolla may be up to 1.4 cm long.

=== Subspecies ===
- Trifolium eriocephalum ssp. cusickii – Cusick's clover, Great Basin region.
- Trifolium eriocephalum ssp. eriocephalum

== Distribution and habitat ==
The plant is native to the northwestern United States, and to California, Nevada, and Utah.

It is a common plant of several types of habitat, including Coast redwood forest, coastal prairie, mixed evergreen forest, and yellow pine forest.
