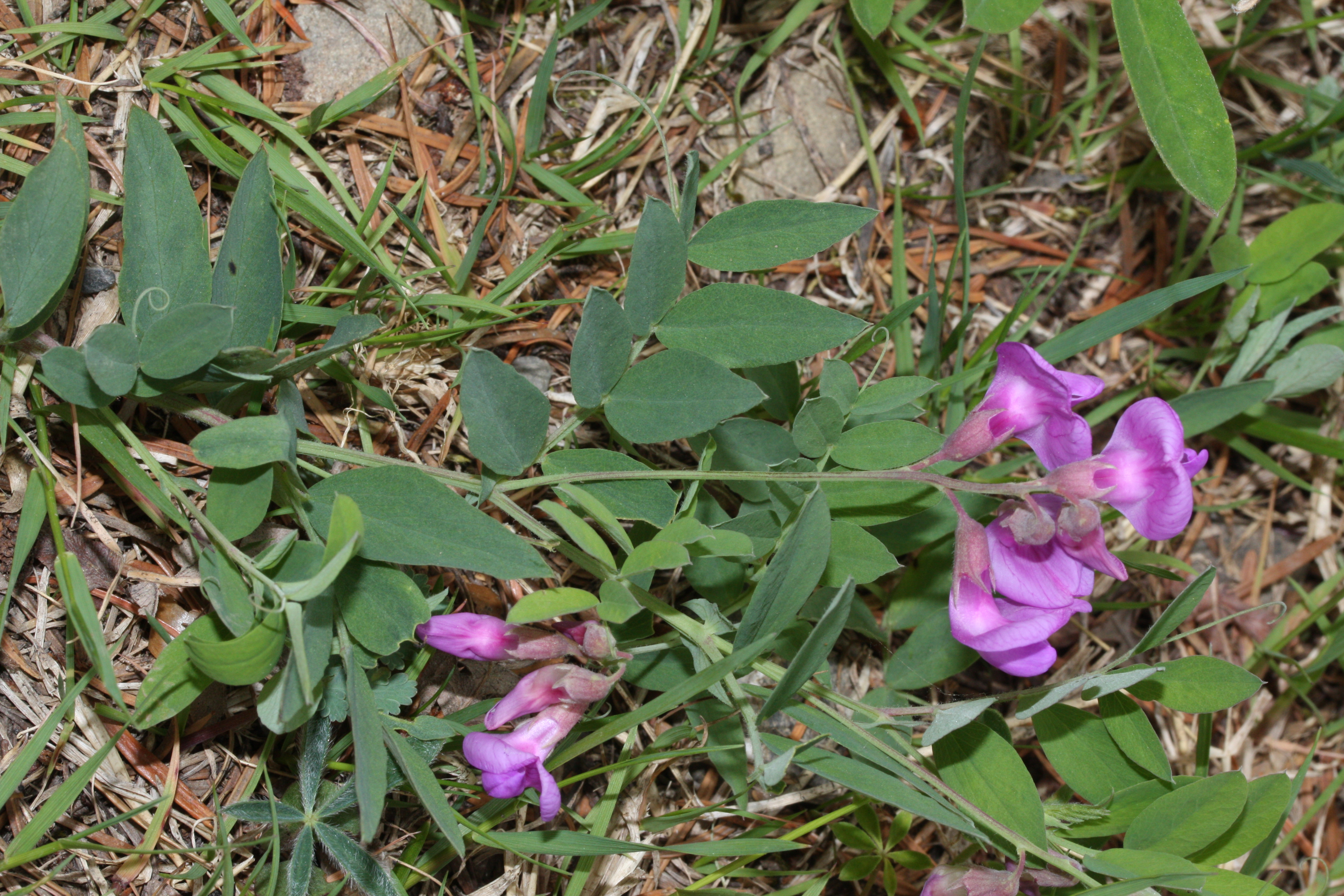

Conservation status
- Secure (NatureServe)

Scientific classification
- Kingdom: Plantae
- Clade: Tracheophytes
- Clade: Angiosperms
- Clade: Eudicots
- Clade: Rosids
- Order: Fabales
- Family: Fabaceae
- Subfamily: Faboideae
- Genus: Vicia
- Species: V. americana

Binomial name
- Vicia americana Muhl. ex Willd.

Varieties
- Vicia americana var. americana; Vicia americana var. minor Hook.

Synonyms
- List: Abacosa americana (Muhl. ex Willd.) Alef. (1861)

= Vicia americana =

Plant species in the pea family

Vicia americana is a species of legume in the vetch genus known by the common names American vetch and purple vetch. It includes a subspecies known as mat vetch.

== Description ==
It is a climbing perennial forb that grows from both taproot and rhizome. The leaves are each made up of oblong leaflets and have tendrils for climbing. It bears showy pea like flowers in shades of lavender and fuchsia. The fruit is a hairless flat pod about 3 centimeters long that contains usually two light brown peas. American vetch is widespread across North America.

It is a common understory plant in many types of forest and other habitats such as chaparral and it provides forage for wild and domesticated animals. This vetch is used to reclaim burned or disturbed land, such as that which has been cleared by wildfire or altered by human activities such as mining or construction. It is drought-tolerant and thrives in both dry and moist, and sandy or coarse loamy soil habitats.
