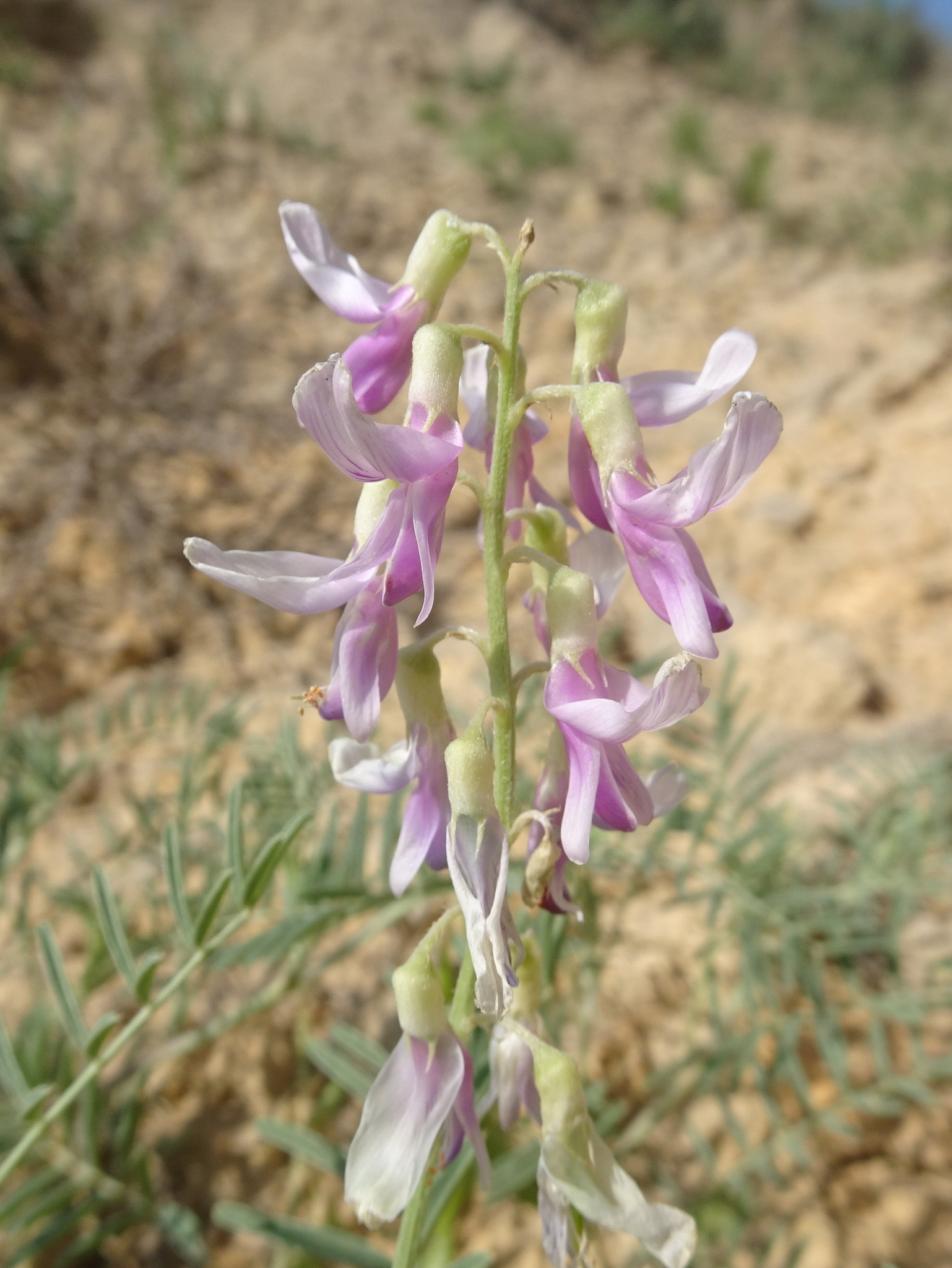

Conservation status
- Secure (NatureServe)

Scientific classification
- Kingdom: Plantae
- Clade: Embryophytes
- Clade: Tracheophytes
- Clade: Spermatophytes
- Clade: Angiosperms
- Clade: Eudicots
- Clade: Rosids
- Order: Fabales
- Family: Fabaceae
- Subfamily: Faboideae
- Genus: Astragalus
- Species: A. racemosus

Binomial name
- Astragalus racemosus Pursh

Synonyms
- List: Astragalus galegoides Nutt.; Astragalus parviflorus Desf. ex Spreng.; Astragalus platycarpus (Rydb.) Barneby; Astragalus platycarpus var. typicus Barneby; Astragalus racemosus var. brevisetus (Rydb.) M.E.Jones; Astragalus racemosus var. typicus Ced.Porter; Craccina racemosa (Pursh) Steven; Tium brevisetum Rydb.; Tium platycarpum Rydb.; Tium racemosum (Pursh) Rydb.; Tragacantha racemosa (Pursh) Kuntze

= Astragalus racemosus =

Species of flowering plant

Astragalus racemosus, the cream milkvetch, is a species of flowering plant in the family Fabaceae. It is native to central North America. A selenium hyperaccumulator, it is considered capable of poisoning livestock as one of the locoweeds.

== Subtaxa ==
The following varieties are accepted:

- Astragalus racemosus var. longisetus M.E.Jones – Colorado, Idaho, Montana, Nebraska, New Mexico, South Dakota, Wyoming, Québec
- Astragalus racemosus var. racemosus – Saskatchewan, Colorado, Kansas, Minnesota, Nebraska, New Mexico, North Dakota, Oklahoma, South Dakota, Texas, Wyoming, Mexico Northeast
- Astragalus racemosus var. treleasei Ced.Porter – Colorado, Utah, Wyoming
