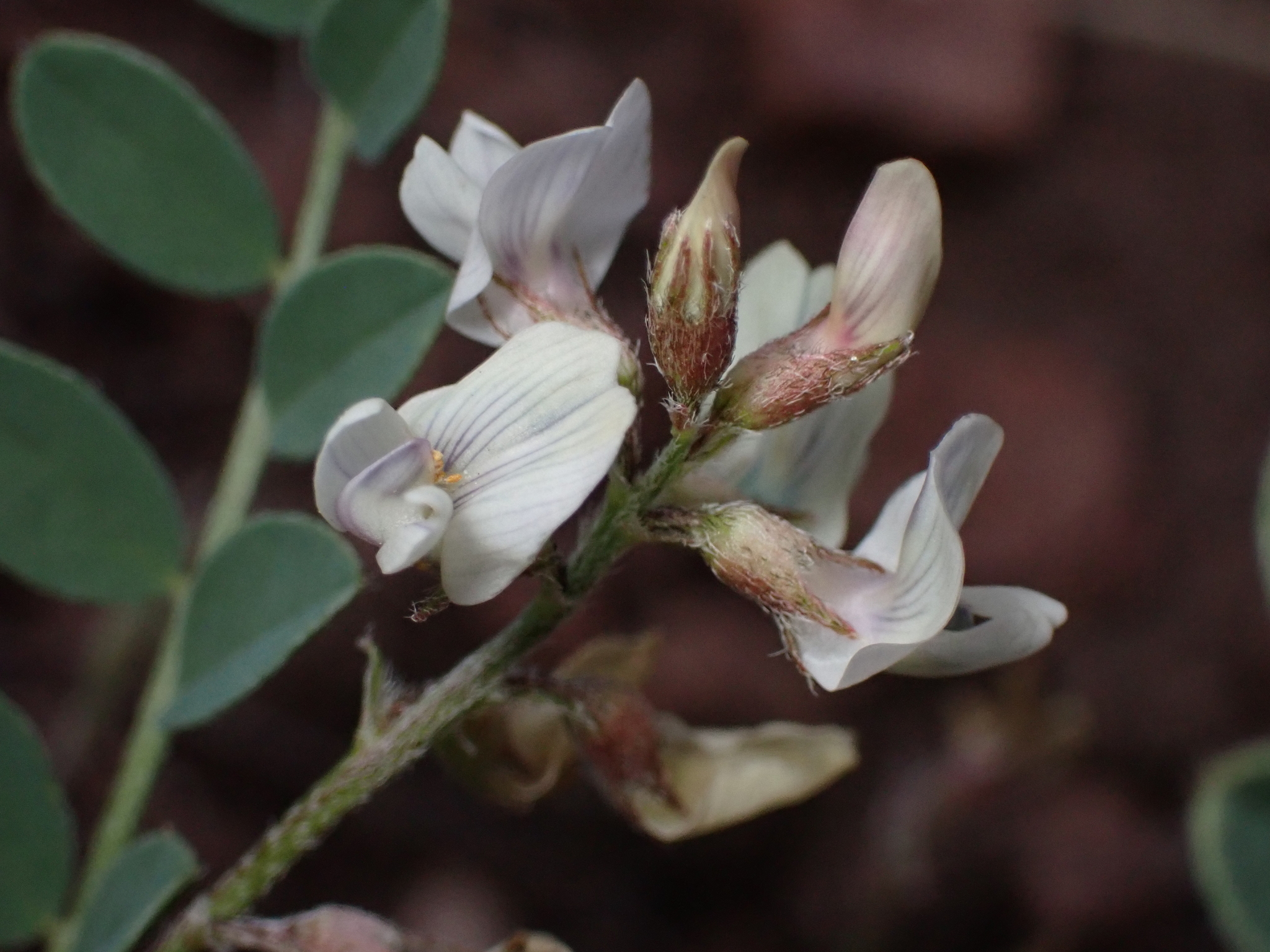
- Variety majusculus, Jefferson County, Colorado

Conservation status
- Least Concern (IUCN 3.1)

- Imperiled (NatureServe)

Scientific classification
- Kingdom: Plantae
- Clade: Tracheophytes
- Clade: Angiosperms
- Clade: Eudicots
- Clade: Rosids
- Order: Fabales
- Family: Fabaceae
- Subfamily: Faboideae
- Genus: Astragalus
- Species: A. sparsiflorus

Binomial name
- Astragalus sparsiflorus A.Gray

Subspecies
- A. s. var. majusculus; A. s. var. sparsiflorus

Synonyms
- Batidophaca sparsiflora; Batidophaca variegata; Tium sparsiflorum; Tium variegatum; Tragacantha sparsiflora

= Astragalus sparsiflorus =

Plant species in the pea family

Astragalus sparsiflorus, the Front Range milkvetch, is a rare species of plant that grows in the Front Range mountains in Colorado.

== Description ==
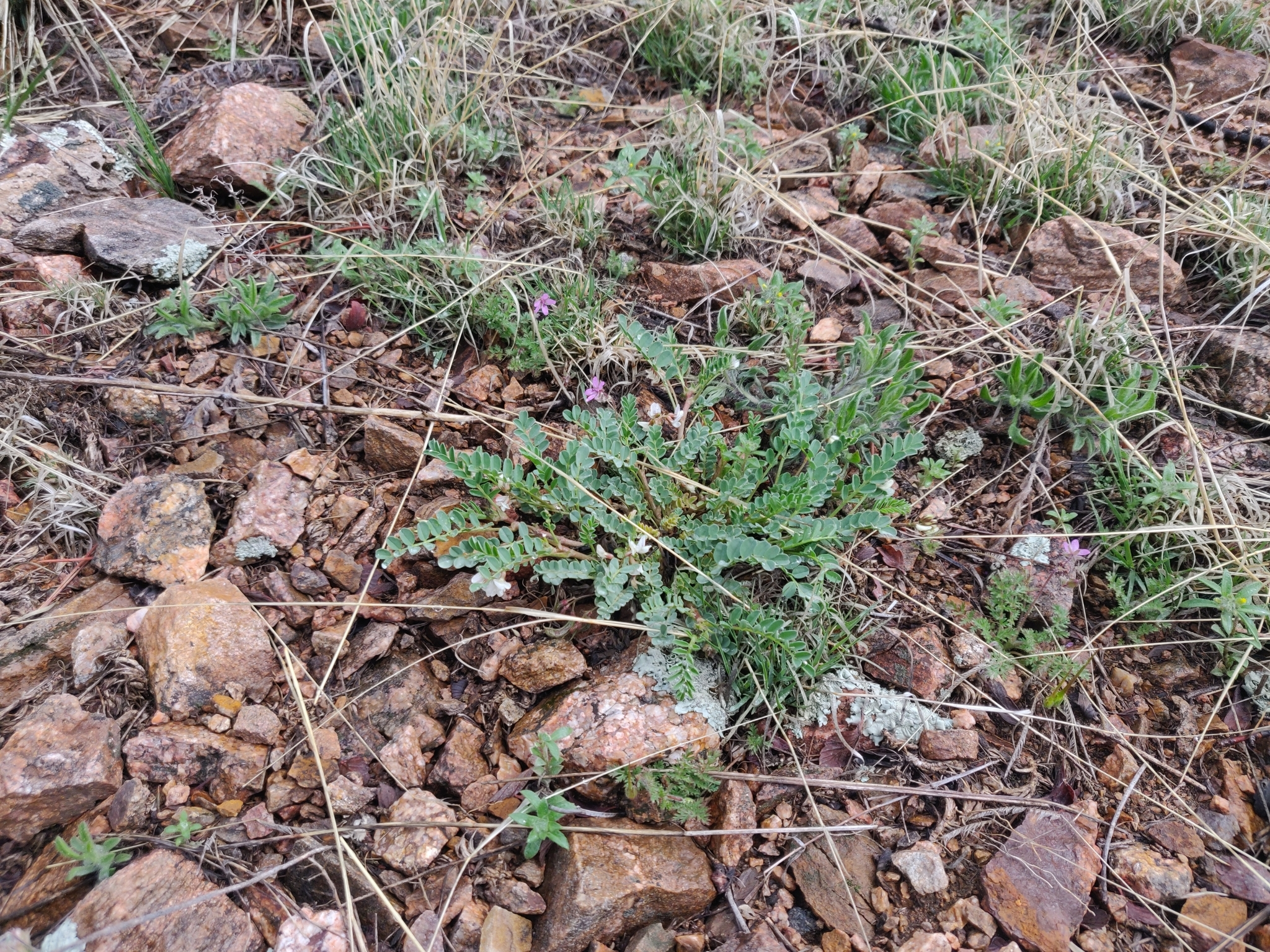
Near the Reynolds Park Trailhead, Jefferson County, Colorado

Front Range milkvetch is a low growing annual or short-lived perennial plant with a narrow taproot. It stems grow 3.5 to 33 centimeters (1.5–13 in) long and are either prostrate or decumbent, trailing along the ground or on the ground with the ends growing upwards, with small, sparse hairs that all point in the same direction.

Its compound leaves are 1.5–10.5 centimeters (0.5–4 in) long with 9 to 19 leaflets. The leaflets are obovate, oblong-oblanceolate, obcordate, almost orbiculate, or elliptic with a length of just 2–15 millimeters. Lower leaf surfaces are similarly hairy to the stems, sparsely strigilose, while the upper surfaces are hairless.

The flowers are white with an upper petal that has pink veins. They are arranged in a raceme, usually with 2 to 20 flowers, but that might have just one solitary bloom. Both varieties can bloom as early as May or as late as July, but variety sparsiflorus is known to bloom in August as well.

== Taxonomy ==
In 1863 the botanist Asa Gray described a new species of plant that he named Astragalus sparsiflorus. It is part of the genus Astragalus which is classified in the Fabaceae family and has two accepted varieties.

=== Astragalus sparsiflorus var. majusculus ===
Variety majusculus was also described by Asa Gray, but in 1864. It grows along the South Platte River for about 80 kilometers (50 mi) upstream from Denver.

=== Astragalus sparsiflorus var. sparsiflorus ===
The autonymic variety of the species has no botanical synonyms. It grows in the mountains of eastern Colorado from the upper parts of the Arkansas River northward to the foothills of Pikes Peak and the upper reaches of the South Platte River.

It has five synonyms, three of the species and two of variety majusculus.

Table of Synonyms
Name	Year	Synonym of:	Notes
Batidophaca sparsiflora (A.Gray) Rydb.	1929	A. sparsiflorus	≡ hom.
Batidophaca variegata (Rydb.) Rydb.	1929	var. majusculus	= het.
Tium sparsiflorum (A.Gray) Rydb.	1905	A. sparsiflorus	≡ hom.
Tium variegatum Rydb.	1907	var. majusculus	= het.
Tragacantha sparsiflora (A.Gray) Kuntze	1891	A. sparsiflorus	≡ hom.
Notes: ≡ homotypic synonym; = heterotypic synonym

=== Names ===
Astragalus sparsiflorus is known by the common name Front Range milkvetch.

== Range and habitat ==
Front Range milkvetch is a Colorado endemic that grows mostly east of the Continental Divide in Custer, Fremont, El Paso, Teller, Park, Douglas, Jefferson, Denver, and Boulder counties. It grows west of the divide in just Grand County.

The species seems to require light amounts of natural soil disturbance to aid in reproduction.

=== Conservation ===
In 2010 the IUCN rated the species as least concern on the IUCN Red List, however in 2025 NatureServe rated it as imperiled. NatureServe reports that of the 28 documented populations, less than half had been observed in the previous two decades. Along with its limited range it is impacted by competition from invasive species, recreation, development, fires, and fire fighting activities. Drought and climate change are also changing its natural habitat.
