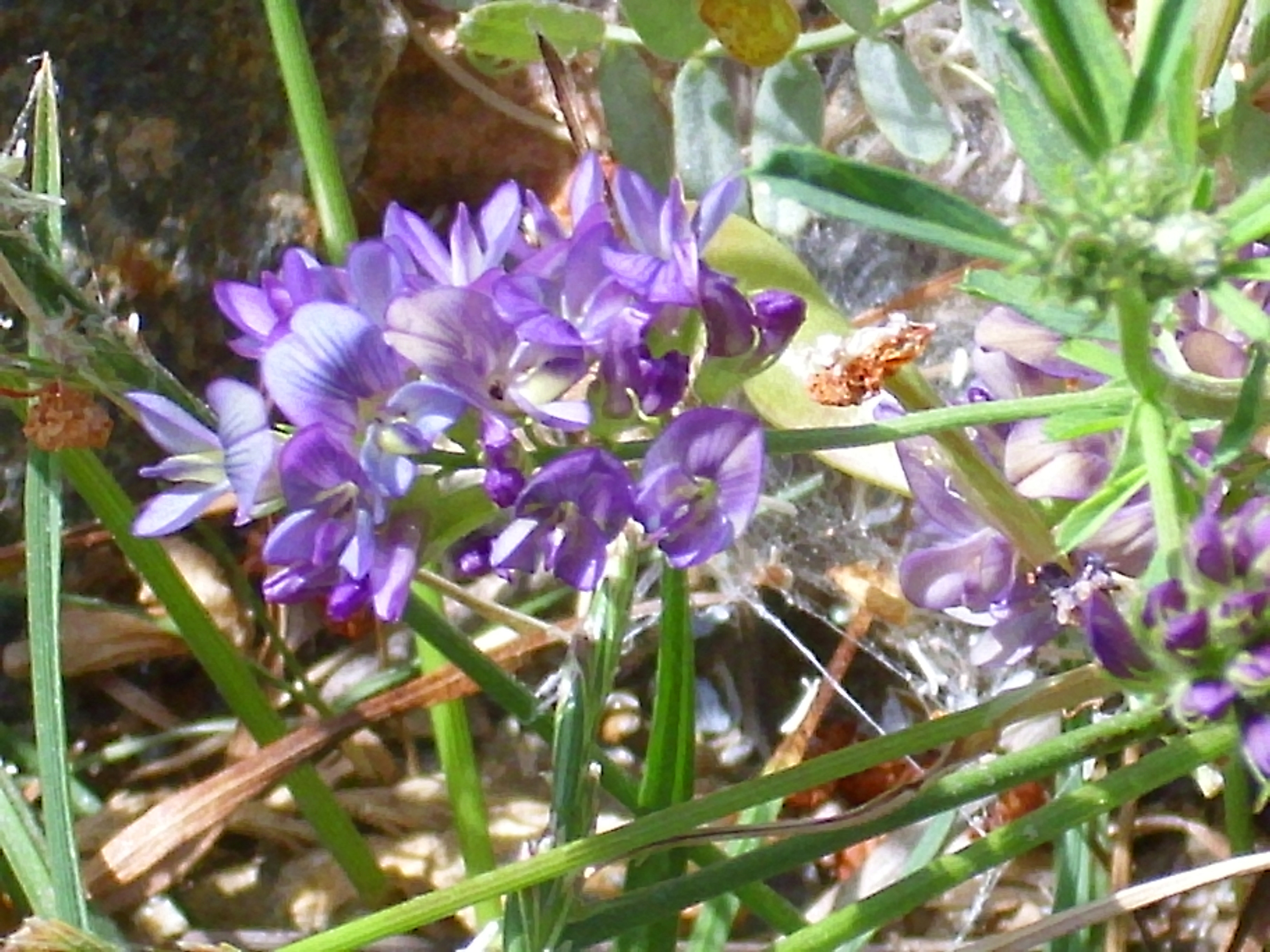
- Inflorescence
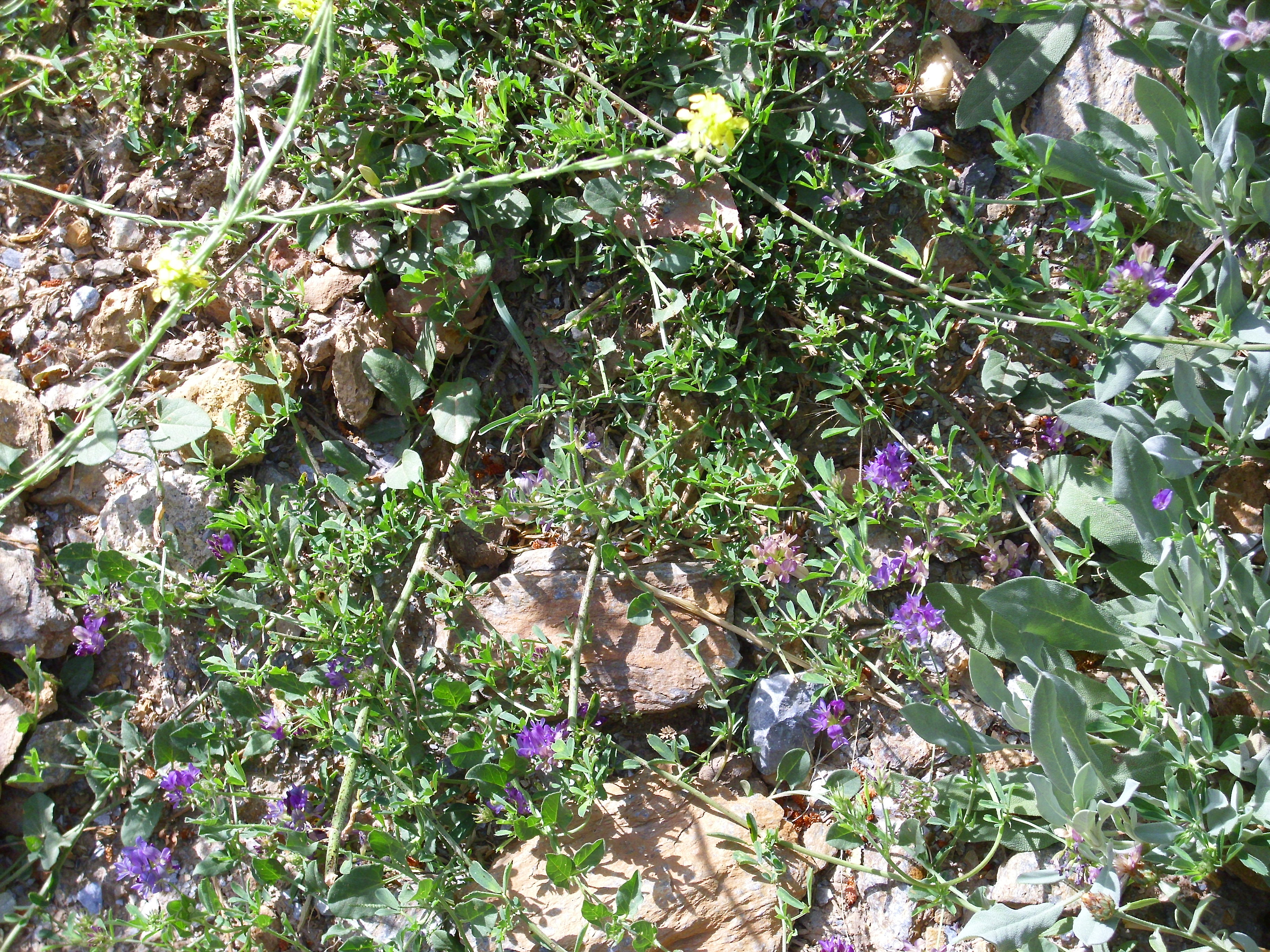
- Habit

Scientific classification
- Kingdom: Plantae
- Clade: Tracheophytes
- Clade: Angiosperms
- Clade: Eudicots
- Clade: Rosids
- Order: Fabales
- Family: Fabaceae
- Subfamily: Faboideae
- Genus: Astragalus
- Species: A. glaux

Binomial name
- Astragalus glaux L.

Synonyms
- List: Astragaloides glaux (L.) Moench; Astragalus capitatus Lam.; Astragalus clusii Bubani; Astragalus glauciformis Pomel; Astragalus glaux var. brevipes Lange; Astragalus glaux var. glauciformis (Pomel) Batt.; Astragalus glaux var. granadinus (Pau) Fern.Casas; Astragalus glaux var. granatensis Pau; Astragalus glaux var. macrocephalus Alleiz.; Astragalus glaux var. purpureus Maire; Astragalus glaux var. rostratus Ball; Astragalus granadinus Pau; Astragalus granatensis Lange; Astragalus hypoglottis Desf.; Astragalus mauritanicus Steven; Astragalus procumbens Mill.; Hypoglottis glaux (L.) Fourr.; Tragacantha glaux (L.) Kuntze; Tragacantha mauritanica (Steven) Kuntze

= Astragalus glaux =

Species of plant

Astragalus glaux is a species of milkvetch in the family Fabaceae, native to the western Mediterranean. It is a camephyte.
