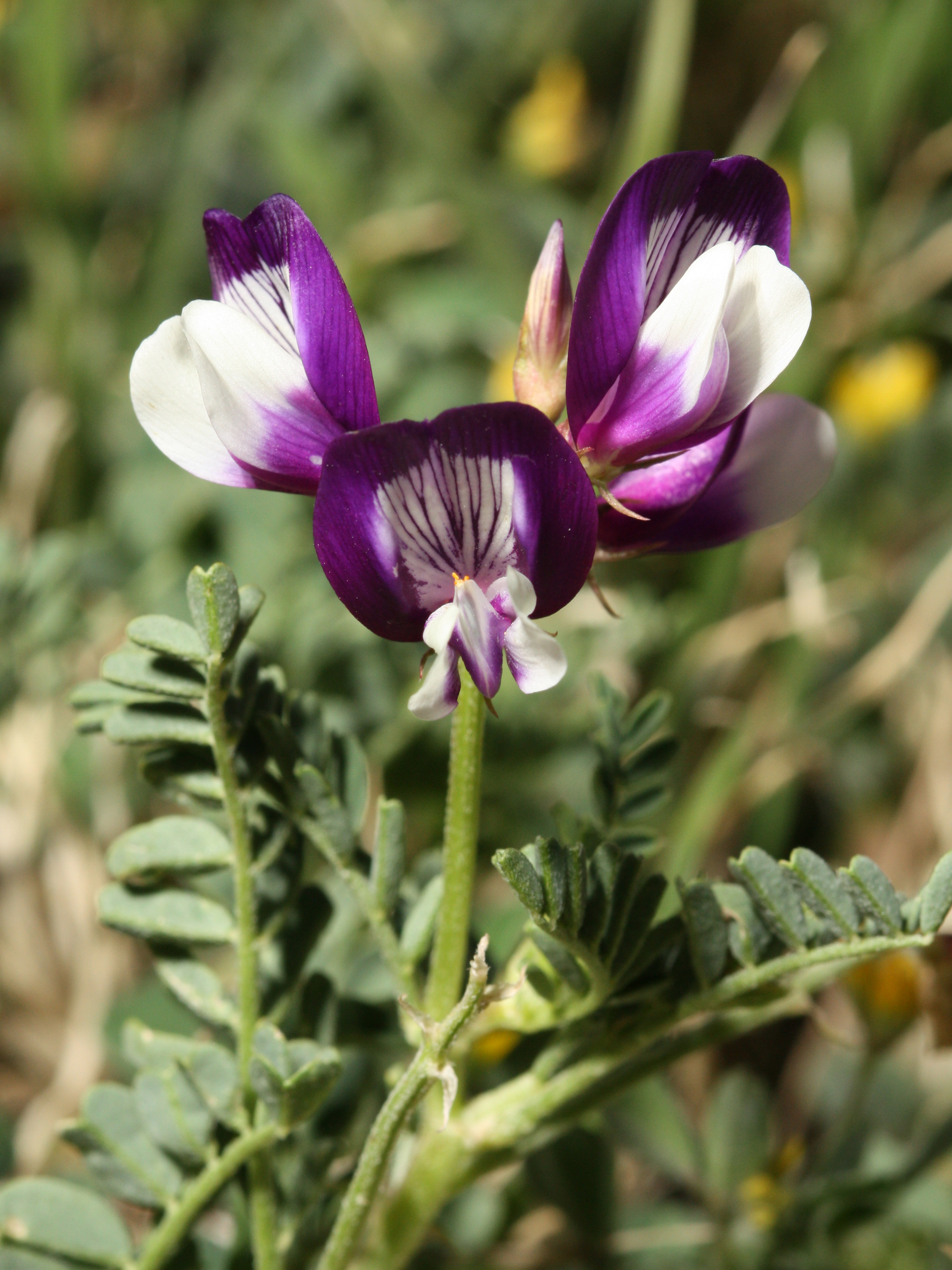

Conservation status
- Secure (NatureServe)

Scientific classification
- Kingdom: Plantae
- Clade: Tracheophytes
- Clade: Angiosperms
- Clade: Eudicots
- Clade: Rosids
- Order: Fabales
- Family: Fabaceae
- Subfamily: Faboideae
- Genus: Astragalus
- Species: A. nuttallianus

Binomial name
- Astragalus nuttallianus DC.

= Astragalus nuttallianus =

Species of legume

Astragalus nuttallianus is a species of milkvetch known by the common names smallflower milkvetch and turkeypeas. It is native to the southwestern and south central United States and northern Mexico, where it can be found in many types of habitat, often in dry areas.

This is an annual herb which is variable in appearance, especially across varieties. It produces slender, hairy stems which reach 4 to 45 centimeters in length. The leaves are up to 6.5 centimeters long and are made up of several oval-shaped pointed or round-tipped leaflets. The inflorescence bears 1 to 4 white to purple or bicolored flowers, each less than a centimeter in length. The fruit is a legume pod 12 to 26 mm long.

There are several varieties of this species:

- A. n. var. austrinus - distributed from California to Oklahoma to northwestern Mexico;
- A. n. var. cedrosensis - native to the Sonoran Desert;
- A. n. var. imperfectus - native to the southwestern United States;
- A. n. var. macilentus - native to New Mexico and Texas;
- A. n. var. micranthiformis - found in the southwestern United States;
- A. n. var. nuttallianus - known from the central US from Kansas to Louisiana;
- A. n. var. trichocarpus - native to Texas and Oklahoma;
- A. n. var. zapatanus - Texas endemic.
