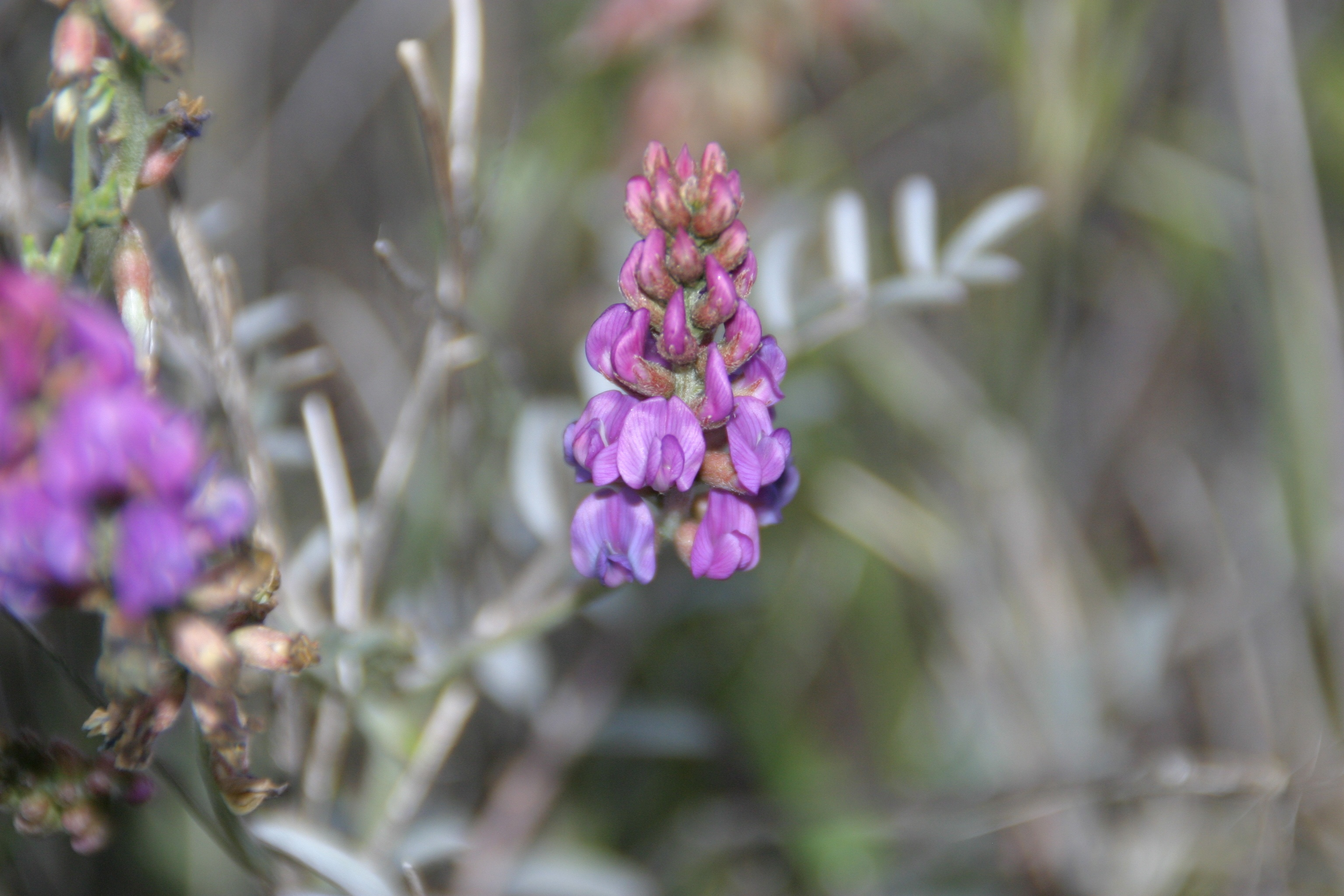
- Inflorescence

Scientific classification
- Kingdom: Plantae
- Clade: Tracheophytes
- Clade: Angiosperms
- Clade: Eudicots
- Clade: Rosids
- Order: Fabales
- Family: Fabaceae
- Subfamily: Faboideae
- Genus: Astragalus
- Species: A. palmeri

Binomial name
- Astragalus palmeri A.Gray

Synonyms
- List: Astragalus metanus M.E.Jones; Astragalus palmeri var. johnstonii (Munz & McBurney) Barneby; Astragalus vaseyi S.Watson; Astragalus vaseyi var. johnstonii Munz & McBurney; Astragalus vaseyi var. metanus (M.E.Jones) Munz & McBurney; Phaca metana (M.E.Jones) Rydb.; Phaca palmeri (A.Gray) Rydb.; Phaca vaseyi (S.Watson) Rydb.; Tragacantha palmeri (A.Gray) Kuntze

= Astragalus palmeri =

Species of plant

Astragalus palmeri, Palmer's milkvetch, is a species of flowering plant in the family Fabaceae. It is native to Arizona, California, and Baja California. A decumbent annual or perennial 20 in (50 cm) long, it is typically found in deserts and dry scrublands.
