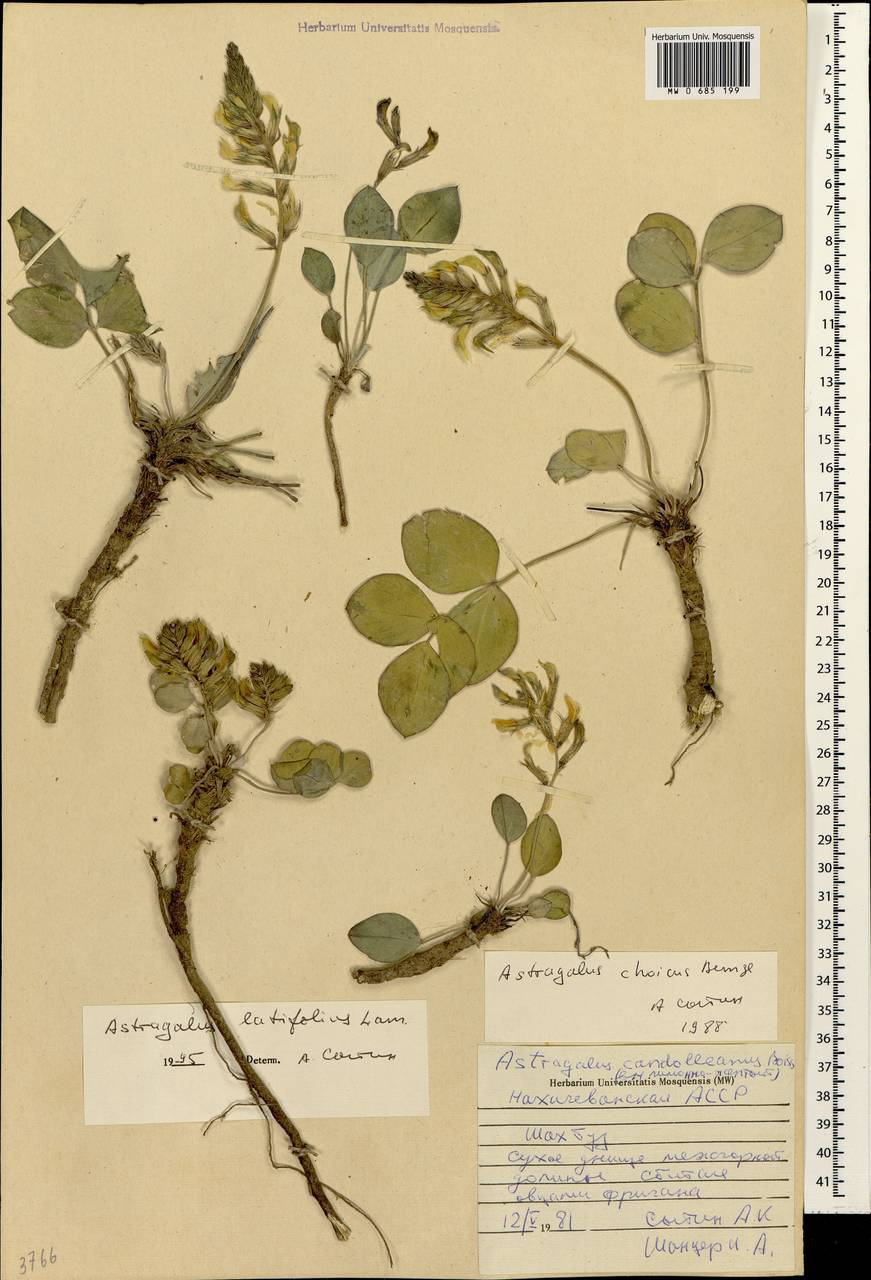

Scientific classification
- Kingdom: Plantae
- Clade: Tracheophytes
- Clade: Angiosperms
- Clade: Eudicots
- Clade: Rosids
- Order: Fabales
- Family: Fabaceae
- Subfamily: Faboideae
- Genus: Astragalus
- Species: A. latifolius

Binomial name
- Astragalus latifolius Lam. (1783)

Synonyms
- Astragalus bayattii Bornm. & Gauba (1935); Astragalus choicus Bunge (1868); Astragalus fedorovii Takht. (1941); Astragalus heteromorphus Boriss. (1947); Astragalus latifolius var. choicus (Bunge) Boiss. (1872); Astragalus platyphyllus Fisch. ex Bunge (1869); Astragalus sukaczevii Derv.-Sok. & Elenevsky (1968); Gueldenstaedtia latifolia Fisch. ex G.Don (1832); Tragacantha choica (Bunge) Kuntze (1891); Tragacantha latifolia (Lam.) Kuntze (1891)

= Astragalus latifolius =

Species of milkvetch

Astragalus latifolius is a species of milkvetch native to Iran, Turkey, and the Caucasus.

It is a perennial, non-climbing herb. It is most commonly found in May and June. It is described as a medifixed hairy Milkvetch along with Astragalus demavendicus.
