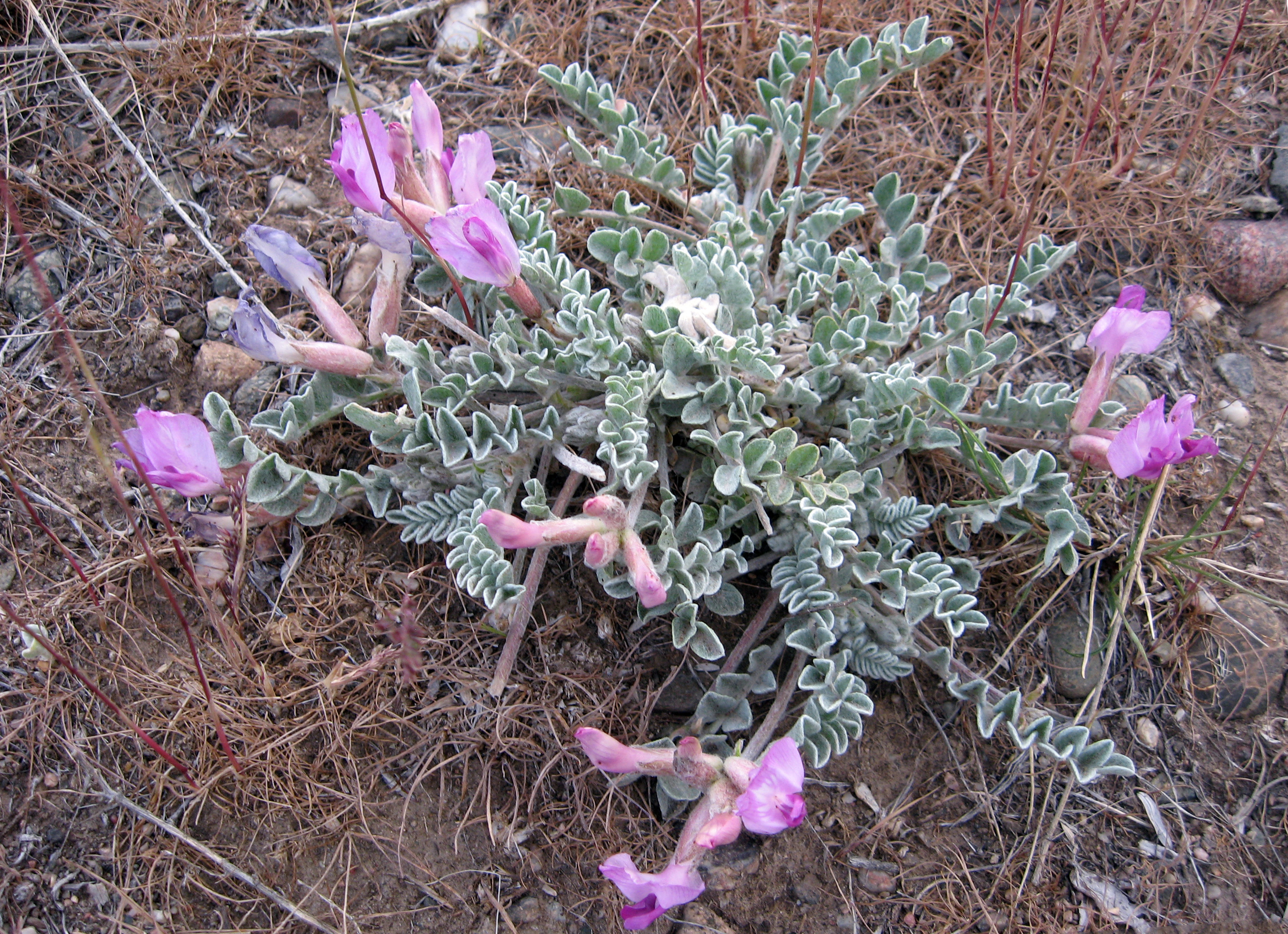

Scientific classification
- Kingdom: Plantae
- Clade: Tracheophytes
- Clade: Angiosperms
- Clade: Eudicots
- Clade: Rosids
- Order: Fabales
- Family: Fabaceae
- Subfamily: Faboideae
- Genus: Astragalus
- Species: A. utahensis

Binomial name
- Astragalus utahensis (Torr.) Torr. & A.Gray

= Astragalus utahensis =

Species of legume

Astragalus utahensis, commonly called the Utah milkvetch, is a species of plant in the legume family.

It is native to western North America, in the U.S. states of Idaho, Nevada, Oregon, Utah, and Wyoming. It is particularly abundant in the Wasatch Mountains. Typical habitats include rocky hillsides, sagebrush openings, and pinyon-juniper areas.

It produces pink-purple flowers in the spring.
