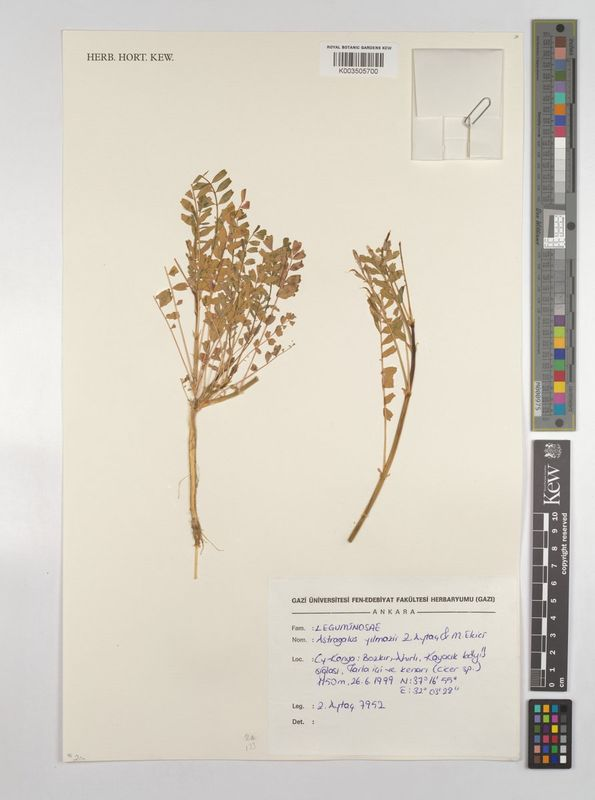

Scientific classification
- Kingdom: Plantae
- Clade: Embryophytes
- Clade: Tracheophytes
- Clade: Spermatophytes
- Clade: Angiosperms
- Clade: Eudicots
- Clade: Rosids
- Order: Fabales
- Family: Fabaceae
- Subfamily: Faboideae
- Genus: Astragalus
- Species: A. yilmazii

Binomial name
- Astragalus yilmazii Aytaç & M.Ekící

= Astragalus yilmazii =

Species of flowering plant

Astragalus yilmazii is a species of flowering plant in the family Fabaceae. It is a subshrub with seven to nine pairs of leaflets, and lilac-coloured petals. The species is endemic to Turkey, and was described in 2001.

== Taxonomy ==
The species was described in 2001, by Zeki Aytaç and Murat Ekící. The holotype was collected near Lake Suğla.

Astragalus yilmazii is closely allied to Astragalus simonii.

== Distribution ==
Astragalus yilmazii is native to the temperate biome of Konya Province, Turkey. It is endemic to Konya, and grows in chickpea fields.

== Description ==
Astragalus yilmazii is an annual or biennial subshrub. It grows up to 35 centimetres (14 in) high, and the stem is up to 30 centimetres (12 in) long. The stem is hollow, and 2–3 millimetres (0.079–0.118 in) wide at the base. The vegetative parts have white hairs.

The leaves are 5–10 centimetres (2.0–3.9 in) long, and have a 1–3 centimetres (0.39–1.18 in) long stem. There are seven to nine pairs of leaflets. The leaflets are narrowly elliptical to narrowly obovate, 5–14 millimetres (0.20–0.55 in) long, and 1.5–3 millimetres (0.059–0.118 in) wide. The bracts are translucent and whitish.

The inflorescences have black hairs. The flower stems are 1–2 millimetres (0.039–0.079 in) long. The calyx is tube-shaped, straw-coloured, and 5–6 millimetres (0.20–0.24 in) long. The calyx has narrowly triangular to linear acute teeth, which are around 1 millimetre (0.039 in) long. The petals are lilac-coloured.

The fruits are curved pods, which are 25–30 millimetres (0.98–1.18 in) long, and 2–3 millimetres (0.079–0.118 in) wide. Each locule has ten to twelve seeds.

== Etymology ==
Astragalus yilmazii is named for Ali Yilmaz, the original collecter of the species.
