= Astragalus zayuensis =

Scientific classification
- Kingdom: Plantae
- Clade: Tracheophytes
- Clade: Angiosperms
- Clade: Eudicots
- Clade: Rosids
- Order: Fabales
- Family: Fabaceae
- Subfamily: Faboideae
- Genus: Astragalus
- Species: A. zayuensis

Binomial name
- Astragalus zayuensis C.C.Ni & P.C.Li

Species of flowering plant

Astragalus zayuensis is a species of flowering plant in the family Fabaceae. It is a perennial with red or purple flowers. The species is native to Tibet, and was described in 1980.

== Taxonomy ==
The species was described by Zhi-Cheng Ni and Pei-Qiong Li in 1980.

== Distribution ==
Astragalus zayuensis is native to the subalpine or subarctic biome of Tibet. It grows at elevations of around 1,700 feet (520 m).

== Description ==
Astragalus zayuensis is a perennial. It is sparsely hairy, and the stems are strongly branched.

The leaves are 3–4 centimetres (1.2–1.6 in) long, and have four to six pairs of leaflets. The leaflets are narrowly elliptical, 4–7 millimetres (0.16–0.28 in) long, and 2–3 millimetres (0.079–0.118 in) wide.

The inflorescence is a raceme with four or five flowers. The inflorescence stem is 0.5–1.2 centimetres (0.20–0.47 in) long. The calyx is around 5 millimetres (0.20 in) long, and may have a covering of black and white hairs. The calyx has teeth that are around 1.7 millimetres (0.067 in) long. The petals are purple or red. The standard is elliptical, around 9 millimetres (0.35 in) long, and around 5 millimetres (0.20 in) wide. The wings are around 8 millimetres (0.31 in) long, and the keel is around 7.5 millimetres (0.30 in) long.

The fruit is an oblong legume around 10 millimetres (0.39 in) long and 3–4 millimetres (0.12–0.16 in) wide. It has a single locule, and white, hairy valves.

== Nomenclature ==
In Chinese, the species is known as 察隅黄芪 (cha yu huang qi).
