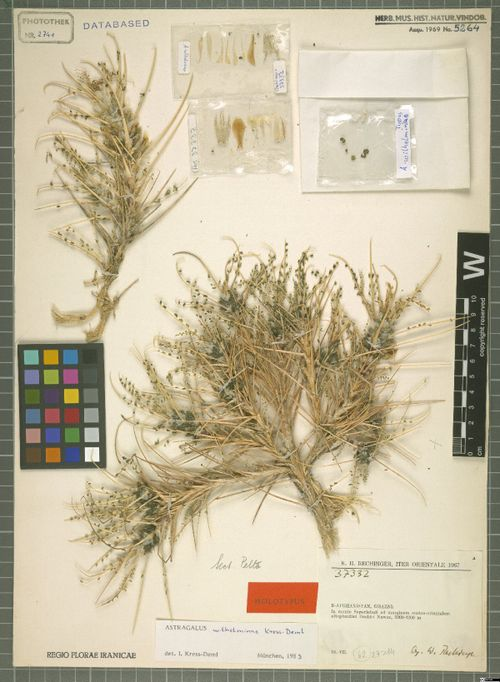

Scientific classification
- Kingdom: Plantae
- Clade: Tracheophytes
- Clade: Angiosperms
- Clade: Eudicots
- Clade: Rosids
- Order: Fabales
- Family: Fabaceae
- Subfamily: Faboideae
- Genus: Astragalus
- Species: A. wilhelminae

Binomial name
- Astragalus wilhelminae I.Deml

= Astragalus wilhelminae =

Species of flowering plant

Astragalus wilhelminae is a species of flowering plant in the family Fabaceae. It is native to the temperate biome of eastern Afghanistan.

The species was first described in 1990 by Irmingard Deml.

Astragalus wilhelminae is a subshrub. The leaves are long and broad. The inflorescences have few flowers.
