= Astragalus ziaratensis =

Scientific classification
- Kingdom: Plantae
- Clade: Tracheophytes
- Clade: Angiosperms
- Clade: Eudicots
- Clade: Rosids
- Order: Fabales
- Family: Fabaceae
- Subfamily: Faboideae
- Genus: Astragalus
- Species: A. ziaratensis

Binomial name
- Astragalus ziaratensis Podlech

Species of flowering plant

Astragalus ziaratensis is a species of flowering plant in the family Fabaceae. It is native to the temperate biome of south-eastern Afghanistan.

Astragalus ziaratensis is a perennial. It grows to around 10 centimetres (3.9 in) high. The leaves are 7–11 centimetres (2.8–4.3 in) long, and grow on stalks that are 1–2 centimetres (0.39–0.79 in) long.

The species was described by Dietrich Podlech in 1988. The holotype was collected 50 kilometres (31 mi) north-west of Kandahar, at an elevation of 2,000 metres (6,600 ft).
