= Astragalus zederbaueri =

Scientific classification
- Kingdom: Plantae
- Clade: Tracheophytes
- Clade: Angiosperms
- Clade: Eudicots
- Clade: Rosids
- Order: Fabales
- Family: Fabaceae
- Subfamily: Faboideae
- Genus: Astragalus
- Species: A. zederbaueri

Binomial name
- Astragalus zederbaueri Stadlm.

Synonyms
- Astragalus surugensis subsp. zederbaueri (Stadlm.) Ponert

Species of flowering plant

Astragalus zederbaueri is a species of flowering plant in the family Fabaceae. It is a perennial native to Turkey, and was described in 1906.

== Taxonomy ==
The species was described by Josef Stadlmann in 1906. Jiří Ponert placed it as a subspecies of Astragalus surugensis.

== Distribution ==
Astragalus zederbaueri is native to the temperate biome of Turkey.

== Description ==
Astragalus zederbaueri is a perennial.
