= Astragalus subcinereus =

Scientific classification
- Kingdom: Plantae
- Clade: Tracheophytes
- Clade: Angiosperms
- Clade: Eudicots
- Clade: Rosids
- Order: Fabales
- Family: Fabaceae
- Subfamily: Faboideae
- Genus: Astragalus
- Species: A. subcinereus

Binomial name
- Astragalus subcinereus A. Gray

Species of legume

Astragalus subcinereus is a species of milkvetch in the family Fabaceae.

== Description ==
The whole plant is around 14-90 cm in length, the leaves are 1.5-8.5 cm in length, the stipules are 1.5-6.5 mm in length, there are around 9-23 leaflets that are 2-16 mm in length and 1-8.5 mm wide. The peduncles were 1.5-10 cm in length.

Subcinereus was found in Arizona, most commonly in the northwest, and to a lesser degree, New Mexico, Nevada, and Utah.
