= Astragalus zerdanus =

Scientific classification
- Kingdom: Plantae
- Clade: Tracheophytes
- Clade: Angiosperms
- Clade: Eudicots
- Clade: Rosids
- Order: Fabales
- Family: Fabaceae
- Subfamily: Faboideae
- Genus: Astragalus
- Species: A. zerdanus

Binomial name
- Astragalus zerdanus Boiss

Synonyms
- Phaca zerdana (Boiss.) Boiss.; Tragacantha zerdana (Boiss.) Kuntze

Species of flowering plant

Astragalus zerdanus is a species of flowering plant in the family Fabaceae. It is a perennial native to Iran, and was described in 1843.

== Taxonomy ==
The species was described by Pierre Edmond Boissier in 1843.

== Distribution ==
Astragalus zerdanus is native to the temperate biome of Western Iran.

== Description ==
Astragalus zerdanus is a perennial.
