= Astragalus chrysostachys =

Scientific classification
- Kingdom: Plantae
- Clade: Embryophytes
- Clade: Tracheophytes
- Clade: Spermatophytes
- Clade: Angiosperms
- Clade: Eudicots
- Clade: Rosids
- Order: Fabales
- Family: Fabaceae
- Subfamily: Faboideae
- Genus: Astragalus
- Species: A. chrysostachys

Binomial name
- Astragalus chrysostachys Boiss.

Synonyms
- Astragalus sekaniensis Ranjbar, Assadi & Karamian; Tragacantha chrysostachys (Boiss.) Kuntze

Species of flowering plant

Astragalus chrysostachys is a species of milkvetch in the family Fabaceae.
