= Astragalus lesbiacus =

Scientific classification
- Kingdom: Plantae
- Clade: Tracheophytes
- Clade: Angiosperms
- Clade: Eudicots
- Clade: Rosids
- Order: Fabales
- Family: Fabaceae
- Subfamily: Faboideae
- Genus: Astragalus
- Species: A. lesbiacus

Binomial name
- Astragalus lesbiacus Candargy

Synonyms
- Astragalus chius Boiss. & Orph.; Astragalus ptilodes var. cariensis Boiss.

Species of flowering plant

Astragalus lesbiacus is a species of flowering plant in the family Fabaceae. It is native to Turkey and East Aegean Islands, such as Lesbos, Rhodes or Samos.
