= Astragalus yosiianus =

Scientific classification
- Kingdom: Plantae
- Clade: Embryophytes
- Clade: Tracheophytes
- Clade: Angiosperms
- Clade: Eudicots
- Clade: Rosids
- Order: Fabales
- Family: Fabaceae
- Subfamily: Faboideae
- Genus: Astragalus
- Species: A. yosiianus

Binomial name
- Astragalus yosiianus Kitam.

Species of flowering plant

Astragalus yosiianus is a species of flowering plant in the family Fabaceae.

== Taxonomy ==
The species was described by Siro Kitamura in 1966.

== Distribution ==
Astragalus yosiianus is native to the temperate biome of Afghanistan.
