= Astragalus murinus =

Scientific classification
- Kingdom: Plantae
- Clade: Embryophytes
- Clade: Tracheophytes
- Clade: Spermatophytes
- Clade: Angiosperms
- Clade: Eudicots
- Clade: Rosids
- Order: Fabales
- Family: Fabaceae
- Subfamily: Faboideae
- Genus: Astragalus
- Species: A. murinus

Binomial name
- Astragalus murinus Boiss.

Synonyms
- Tragacantha murina (Boiss.) Kuntze

Species of flowering plant

Astragalus murinus is a species of milkvetch in the family Fabaceae. It is native to Iran.
