= Astragalus hystrix =

Scientific classification
- Kingdom: Plantae
- Clade: Tracheophytes
- Clade: Angiosperms
- Clade: Eudicots
- Clade: Rosids
- Order: Fabales
- Family: Fabaceae
- Subfamily: Faboideae
- Genus: Astragalus
- Species: A. hystrix

Binomial name
- Astragalus hystrix Bunge

Species of legume

Astragalus hystrix is a species of milkvetch in the family Fabaceae. It is a perennial, non-climbing shrub.

== Habitat ==
Astragalus hystrix naturally grows in Southeast Turkey and Northwest Iran.
