= Astragalus cephalanthus =

Scientific classification
- Kingdom: Plantae
- Clade: Tracheophytes
- Clade: Angiosperms
- Clade: Eudicots
- Clade: Rosids
- Order: Fabales
- Family: Fabaceae
- Subfamily: Faboideae
- Genus: Astragalus
- Species: A. cephalanthus

Binomial name
- Astragalus cephalanthus DC.

Species of legume

Astragalus cephalanthus is a species of milkvetch in the family Fabaceae. It is native to Iran. It is most commonly found in the month of May.
