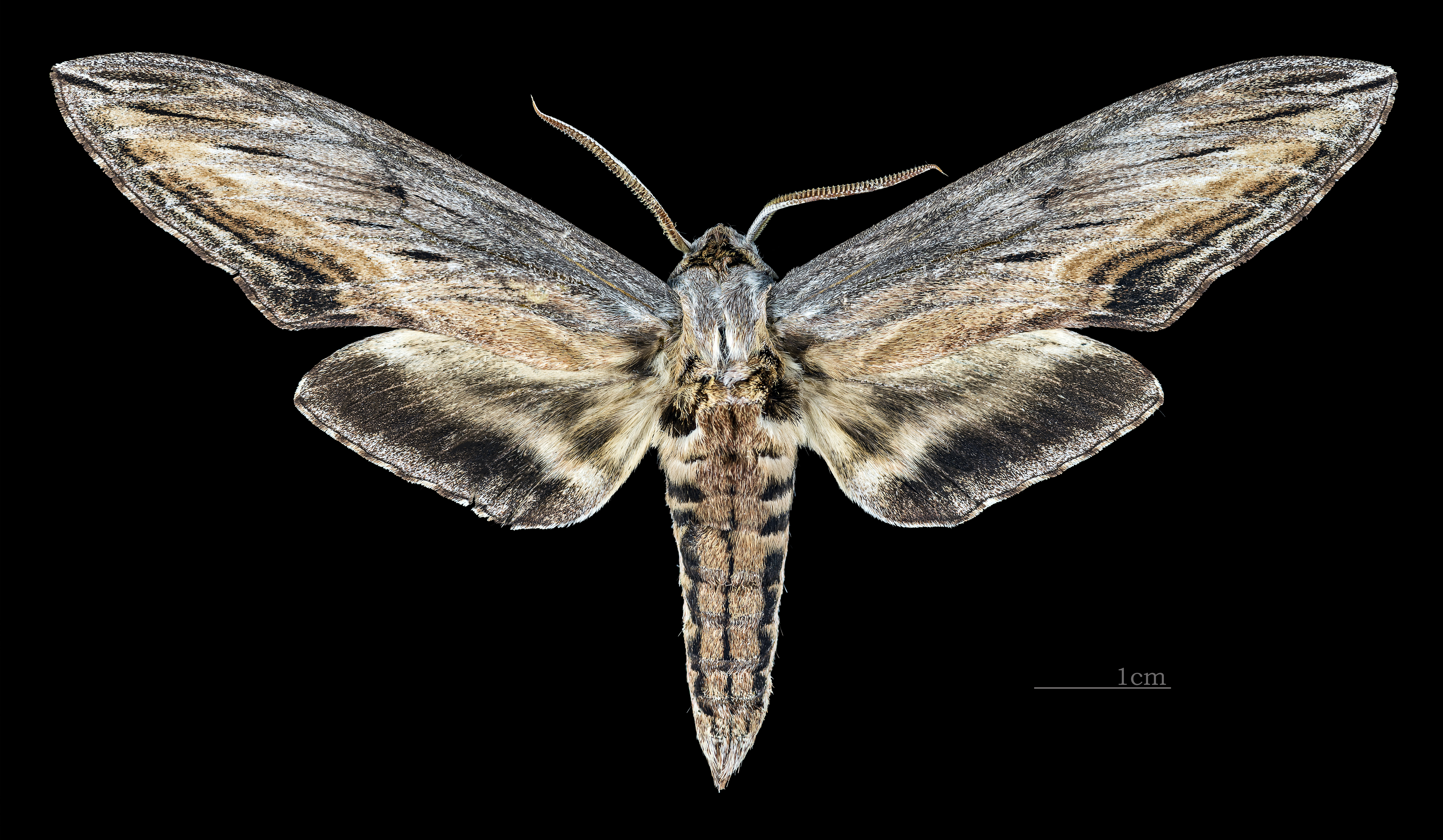
- Male, dorsal view
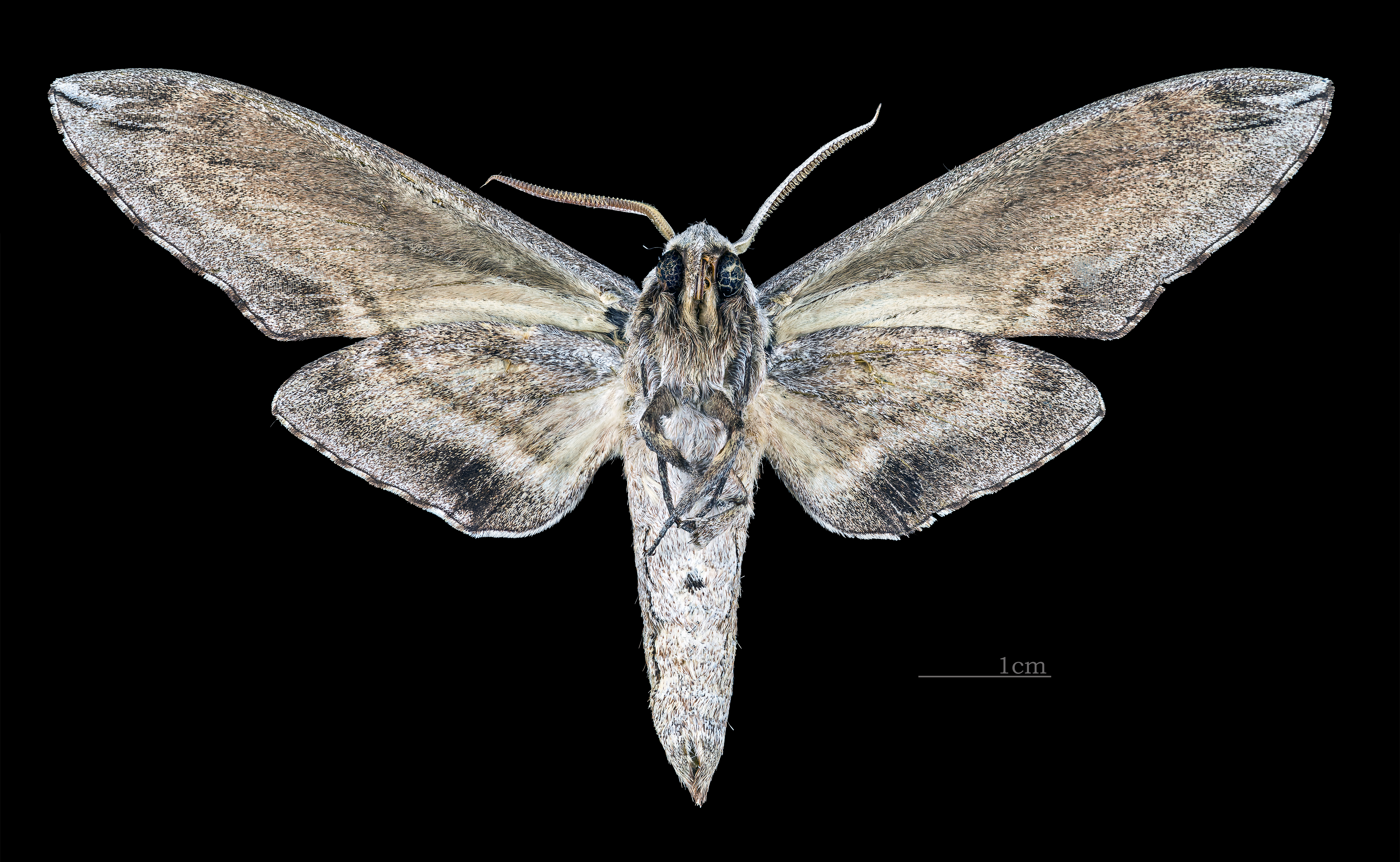
- Male, ventral view

Scientific classification
- Kingdom: Animalia
- Phylum: Arthropoda
- Class: Insecta
- Order: Lepidoptera
- Family: Sphingidae
- Genus: Sphinx
- Species: S. franckii

Binomial name
- Sphinx franckii Neumoegen, 1893

= Sphinx franckii =

Franck's sphinx moth

Species of moth

Sphinx franckii, or Franck's sphinx moth is a moth in the family Sphingidae. The species was first described by Berthold Neumoegen in 1893. It is known from lowland deciduous woodland in the eastern United States but also suburban areas where lilacs (Syringa species) are planted, ranging from New York to northern Florida east to Missouri and Louisiana.

The wingspan is 100–128 mm. There is one generation in the north with adults on wing from late June to early July. In the south, there may be a partial second generation with adults on wing from August to September. Adults most frequently nectar from phlox (Phlox paniculata and cultivars). However, males will occasionally gather over moist charcoal to obtain nutrients from the charred wood prior to copulation. Adults fly at dusk and in the early morning hours.

The larvae feed on several plants in the olive family. The only native hosts of this moth are ash (Fraxinus) and fringe tree (Chionanthus virginicus). However, larvae seem to have a liking for ornamental lilac (Syringa), and occasionally will feed on privet (Ligustrum). Larvae are commonly parasitized by native braconid wasps. The introduced tachinid fly poses additional threat to the beautiful caterpillars of this species. Larvae pupate in subterranean chambers a few inches beneath the surface of the ground. The pupa is a shiny, chestnut-brown color.
