= Phlox tenuis =

Phlox tenuis can refer to:

- Phlox tenuis (A.Gray) E.E.Nelson, a synonym of Phlox cuspidata Scheele
- Phlox tenuis Wooton & Standl., a synonym of Phlox longifolia Nutt.
