= Mountain phlox =

Mountain phlox is a common name for several plants and may refer to:

- Phlox austromontana, native to the southwestern United States and Baja California
- Phlox multiflora, native to the Rocky Mountains and Great Basin in the western United States
- Phlox subulata, native to the eastern and central United States
