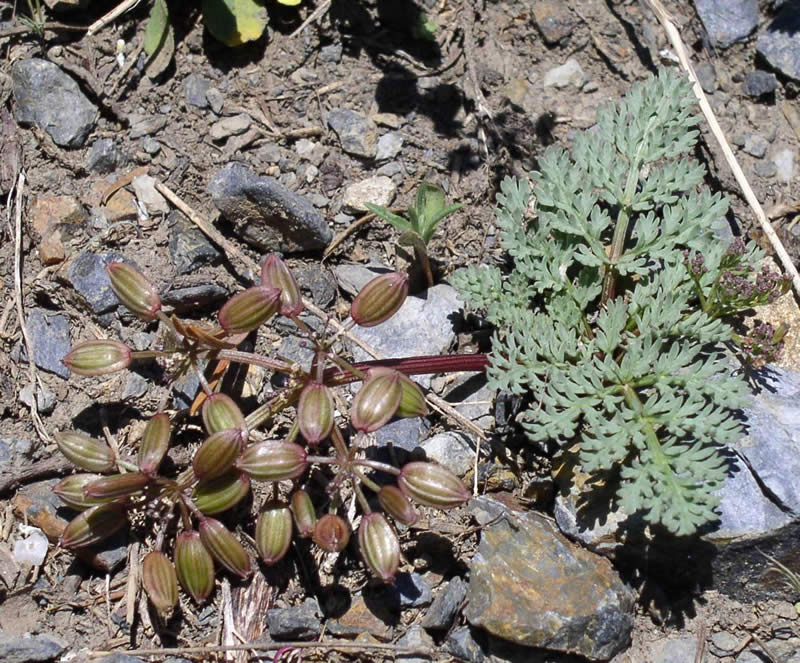

Conservation status
- Critically Imperiled (NatureServe)

Scientific classification
- Kingdom: Plantae
- Clade: Tracheophytes
- Clade: Angiosperms
- Clade: Eudicots
- Clade: Asterids
- Order: Apiales
- Family: Apiaceae
- Genus: Lomatium
- Species: L. erythrocarpum

Binomial name
- Lomatium erythrocarpum R.J. Meinke & Constance

= Lomatium erythrocarpum =

Species of flowering plant

Lomatium erythrocarpum, known by the common name redfruit desertparsley, is a rare species of flowering plant in the carrot family. It is endemic to Oregon in the United States, where it is limited to a section of the Blue Mountains within Baker County.

This wild plant is a petite perennial herb with leaves that lie against the ground and a flowering stalk that grows just a few centimeters tall. The hairless, gray-green, waxy-textured leaves are finely divided into many tiny segments. The leaf morphology may help it retain heat and increase photosynthesis, which is necessary because it grows at high elevations. It also lets the plant bloom earlier in the season. The leaves grow during or after flowering, which begins in June. The inflorescence is an umbel of flowers with purple sepals and tiny purple-striped white petals. The shiny, oval-shaped fruit is often red-tinged. It may be up to a centimeter long. The flowers are pollinated by a syrphid fly and possibly a bumblebee.

This plant grows only on the Elkhorn Ridge of the Blue Mountains in eastern Oregon. It occurs at elevations above 2500 meters (8200 feet). It can be found in the ecotone between the shrub-steppe habitat and subalpine woodland. Shrub-steppe is dominated by mountain mahogany (Cercocarpus ledifolius) and sagebrush (Artemisia tridentata), and the woodlands feature white-bark pine (Pinus albicaulis) and Engelmann's spruce (Picea engelmannii). Other species in the area include Applegate's paintbrush (Castilleja applegatei), blue flax (Linum lewisii), Cusick's biscuitroot (Lomatium cusickii), goosefoot violet (Viola purpurea), mountain phlox (Phlox austromontana), and spike trisetum (Trisetum spicatum). It occurs in open areas with full sun. It does not appear to tolerate soils high in calcium.

One threat to this rare plant is the mountain goat, which is an introduced species in the area. Climate change is also expected to have negative effects on this high-elevation plant.
