= Hairy phlox =

Hairy phlox is a common name for several plants and may refer to:

- Phlox amoena, native to the southeastern United States
- Phlox hirsuta, native to Siskiyou County, California
