= Coleophora infuscatella =

Scientific classification
- Kingdom: Animalia
- Phylum: Arthropoda
- Clade: Pancrustacea
- Class: Insecta
- Order: Lepidoptera
- Family: Coleophoridae
- Genus: Coleophora
- Species: C. infuscatella

Binomial name
- Coleophora infuscatella Clemens, 1860

Species of moth

Coleophora infuscatella is a moth of the family Coleophoridae. It is found in the United States, including Pennsylvania.

The larvae feed on the leaves of Phlox species. They create a trivalved, tubular silken case.
