= Woodland phlox =

Woodland phlox is a common name for several plants and may refer to:

- Phlox adsurgens, native to western North America
- Phlox divaricata, native to eastern North America
