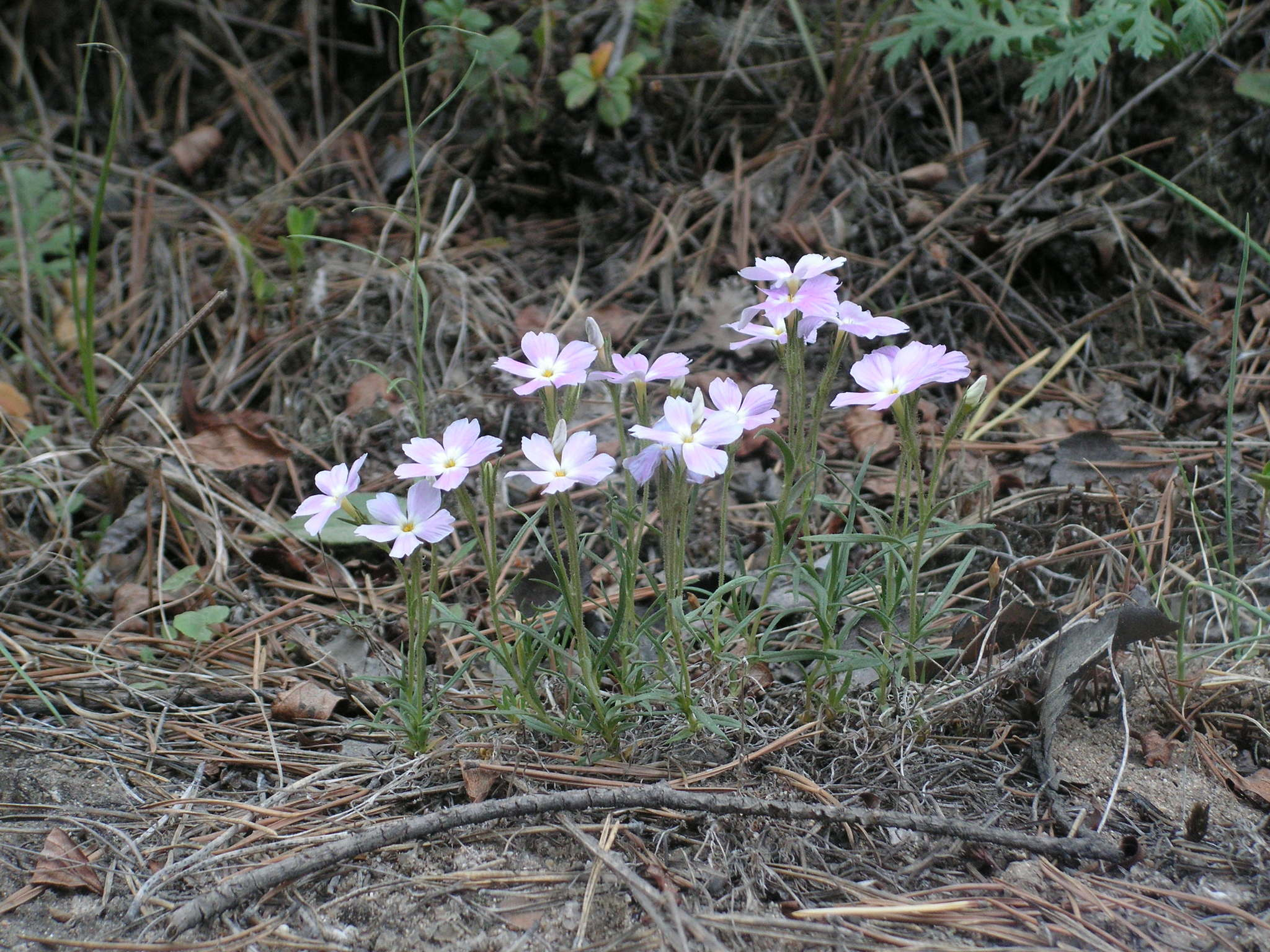
- Habit

Scientific classification
- Kingdom: Plantae
- Clade: Embryophytes
- Clade: Tracheophytes
- Clade: Angiosperms
- Clade: Eudicots
- Clade: Asterids
- Order: Ericales
- Family: Polemoniaceae
- Genus: Phlox
- Species: P. sibirica

Binomial name
- Phlox sibirica L.

= Phlox sibirica =

Species of flowering plant

Phlox sibirica, the Siberian phlox, is a species of flowering plant in the family Polemoniaceae, native to eastern European Russia, most regions of Siberia, northern parts of the Russian Far East, Mongolia, and Alaska.

== Description ==
Phlox sibirica is a rhizomatous geophyte with flowers that vary from white to a pale blue-violet. A perennial with a cushion-like growth form, it reaches about 10 cm (4 in).
