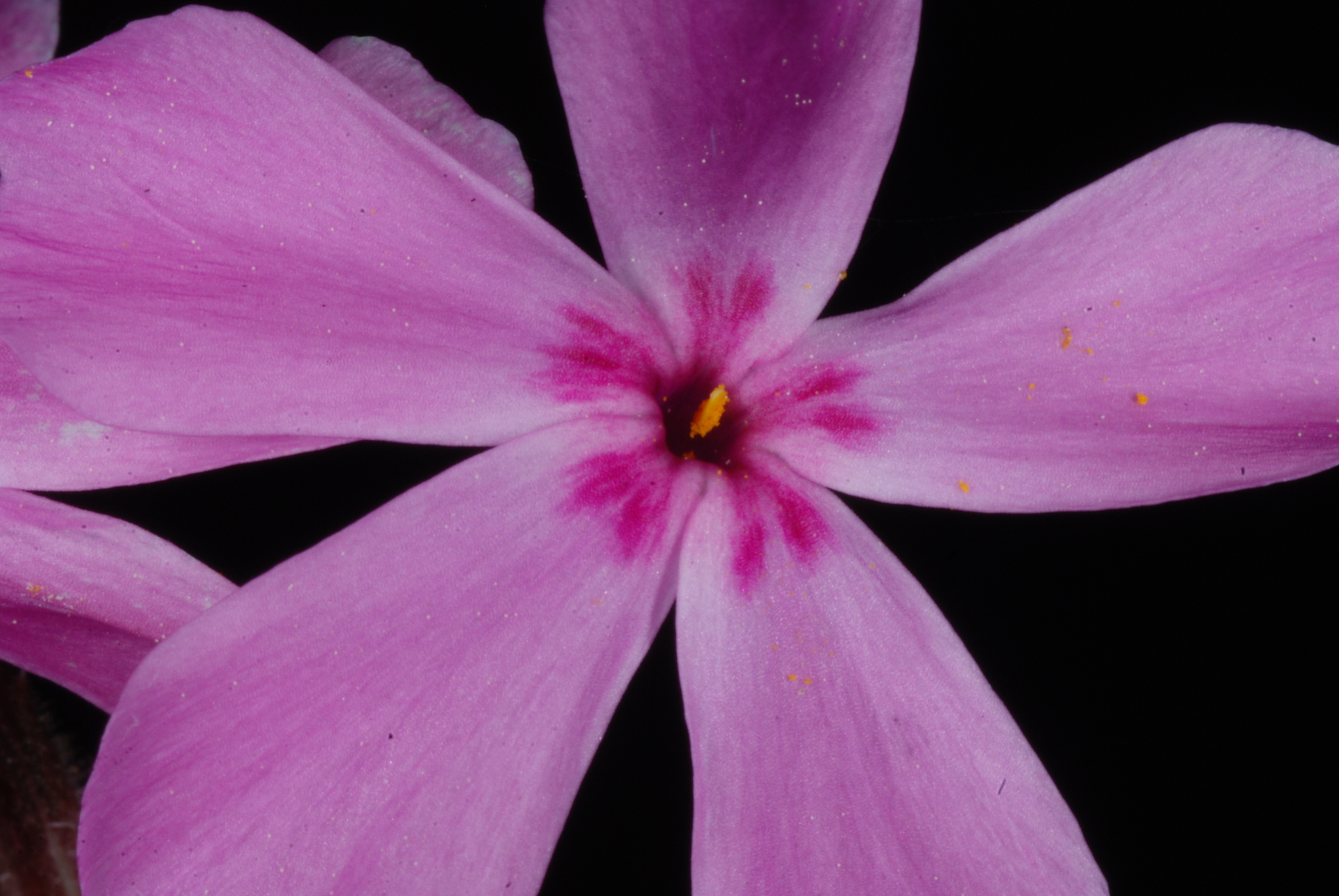

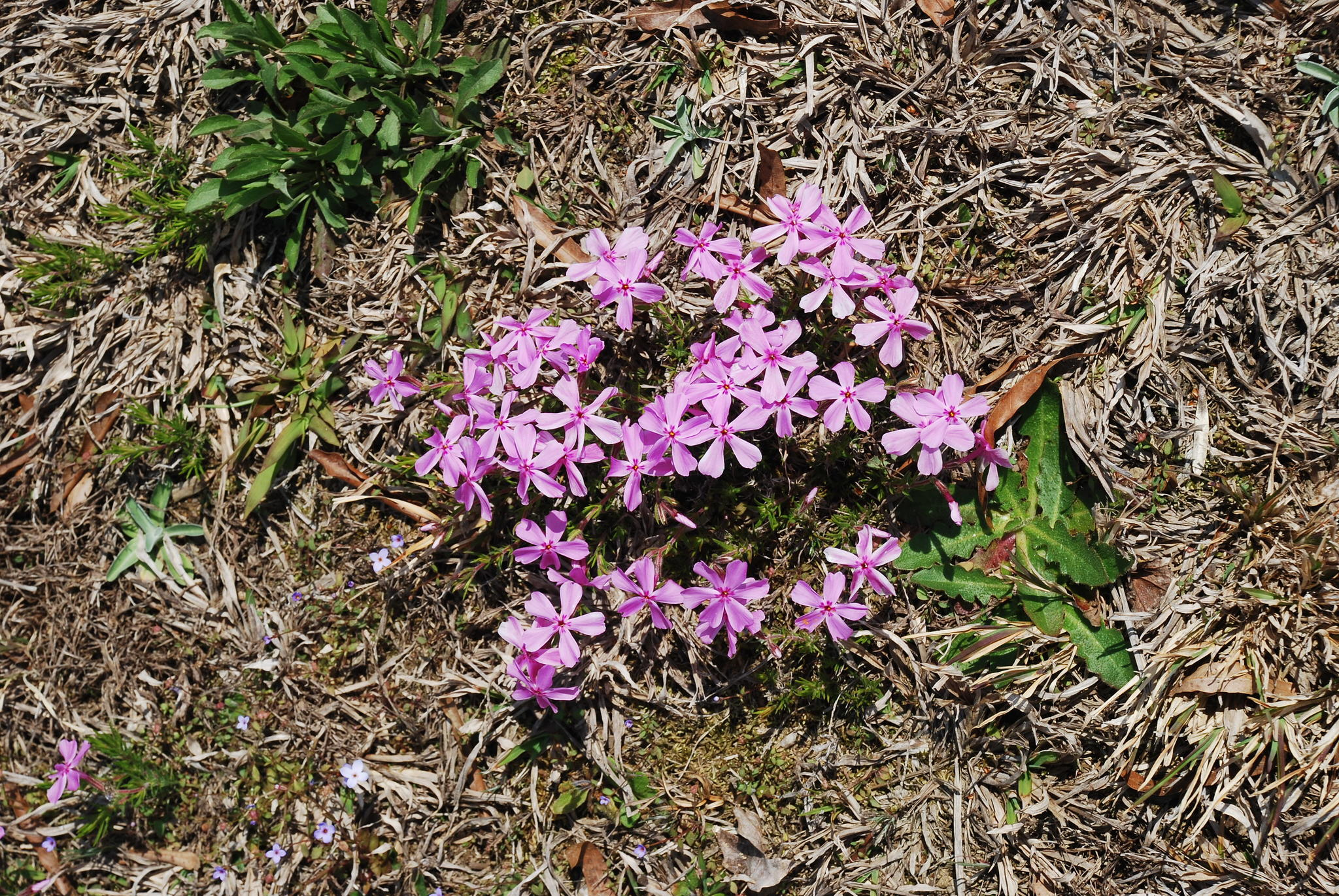

Conservation status
- Apparently Secure (NatureServe)

Scientific classification
- Kingdom: Plantae
- Clade: Embryophytes
- Clade: Tracheophytes
- Clade: Spermatophytes
- Clade: Angiosperms
- Clade: Eudicots
- Clade: Asterids
- Order: Ericales
- Family: Polemoniaceae
- Genus: Phlox
- Species: P. nivalis

Binomial name
- Phlox nivalis G.Lodd. ex Sweet

Subspecies
- Phlox nivalis subsp. nivalis; Phlox nivalis subsp. texensis Lundell

Synonyms
- Phlox hentzii; Phlox texensis

= Phlox nivalis =

Species of flowering plant

Phlox nivalis is a species of flowering plant in the Polemoniaceae family with the common names trailing phlox and pineland phlox. It is native to the southeastern United States, Texas, Michigan, and Utah.

One subspecies of this plant, Phlox nivalis subsp. texensis, the Texas trailing phlox or Texan phlox, is a rare plant federally listed as an endangered species of the United States. The subspecies is endemic to Texas, where there are populations in three counties. At one time, the subspecies was thought to be extinct. It was rediscovered in 1972.

== Taxonomy ==
In 1827 Phlox nivalis was named by Robert Sweet, though he attributed the name to George Loddiges. It is part of the Phlox genus which is classified in the Polemoniaceae family and has two accepted subspecies.

- Phlox nivalis subsp. nivalis – Native to the southeastern US, Michigan, and Utah
- Phlox nivalis subsp. texensis – Native to Texas

Phlox nivalis has 11 synonyms of the species or one of its two subspecies.

Table of Synonyms
Name	Year	Rank	Synonym of:	Notes
Phlox hentzii Nutt.	1834	species	subsp. nivalis	= het.
Phlox nivalis subsp. hentzii (Nutt.) Wherry	1956	subspecies	subsp. nivalis	= het.
Phlox nivalis var. hentzii (Nutt.) D.B.Ward	2012	variety	subsp. nivalis	= het.
Phlox nivalis f. roseiflora Fernald	1949	form	subsp. nivalis	= het.
Phlox nivalis f. rubella Moldenke	1973	form	subsp. nivalis	= het.
Phlox nivalis var. texensis (Lundell) B.L.Turner	1998	variety	subsp. texensis	≡ hom.
Phlox subulata subvar. hentzii (Nutt.) Brand	1907	subvariety	subsp. nivalis	= het.
Phlox subulata f. hentzii (Nutt.) Voss	1894	form	subsp. nivalis	= het.
Phlox subulata subsp. nivalis (G.Lodd. ex Sweet) Brand	1907	subspecies	P. nivalis	≡ hom.
Phlox subulata f. nivalis (G.Lodd. ex Sweet) Voss	1894	form	P. nivalis	≡ hom.
Phlox texensis (Lundell) Lundell	1945	species	subsp. texensis	≡ hom.
Notes: ≡ homotypic synonym; = heterotypic synonym
