= Phlox glabriflora =

Scientific classification
- Kingdom: Plantae
- Clade: Tracheophytes
- Clade: Angiosperms
- Clade: Eudicots
- Clade: Asterids
- Order: Ericales
- Family: Polemoniaceae
- Genus: Phlox
- Species: P. glabriflora

Binomial name
- Phlox glabriflora (Brand) Whitehouse

Species of flowering plant

Phlox glabriflora is an annual species of Phlox found in southern Texas. It is commonly called Rio Grande phlox.
