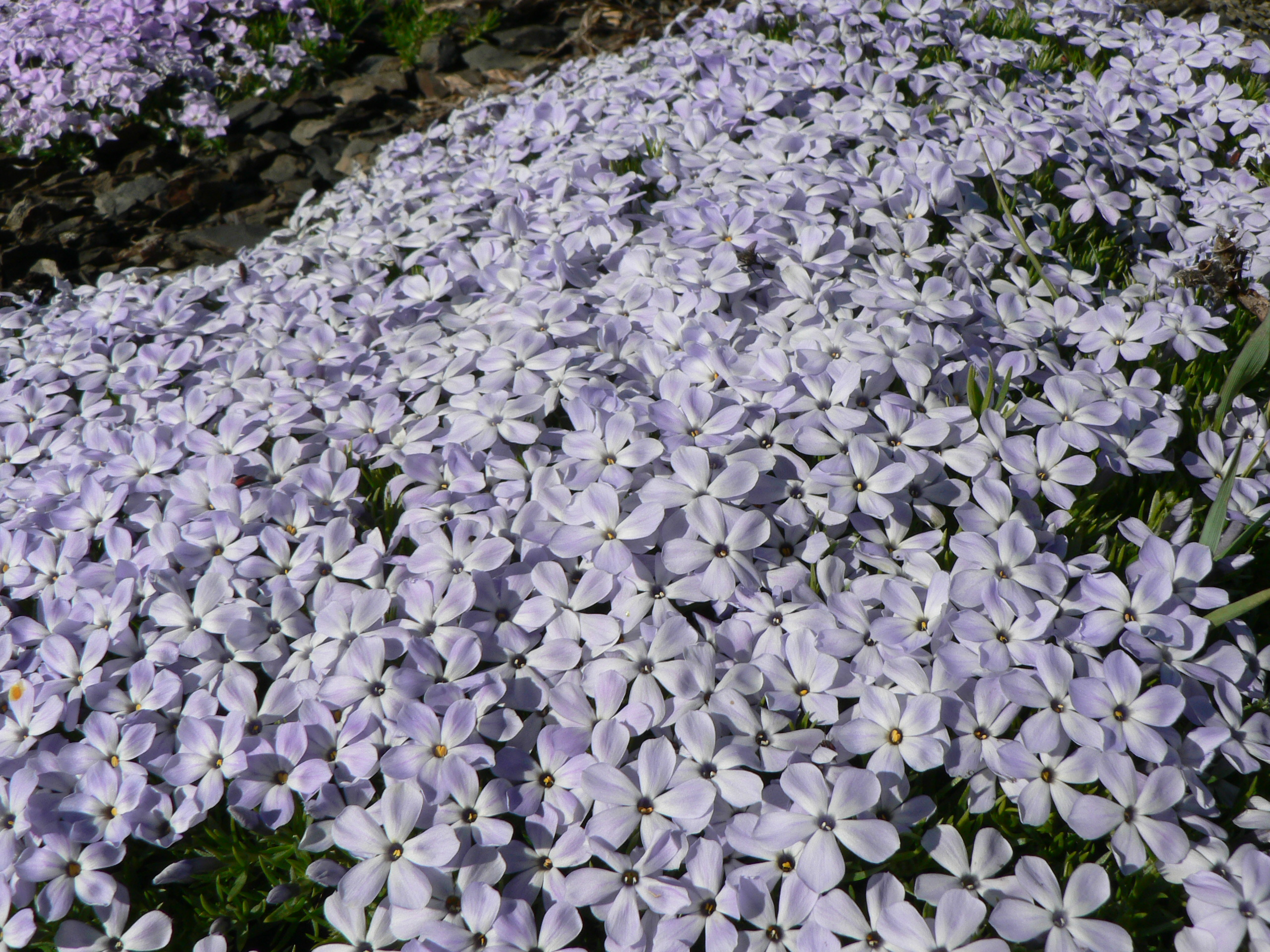

Scientific classification
- Kingdom: Plantae
- Clade: Tracheophytes
- Clade: Angiosperms
- Clade: Eudicots
- Clade: Asterids
- Order: Ericales
- Family: Polemoniaceae
- Genus: Phlox
- Species: P. diffusa

Binomial name
- Phlox diffusa Benth.

= Phlox diffusa =

Species of flowering plant

Phlox diffusa is a species of phlox known by the common name spreading phlox. It is native to western North America from British Columbia to the southwestern United States to the Dakotas, where it grows in many types of habitat, including rocky, high elevation mountain slopes. It is a very compact mat-forming perennial herb growing in cushions or patches of short, decumbent stems. The linear, lance-shaped, or needle-like leaves are no more than 1.5 centimeters long and are oppositely arranged in bundles on the short stems. The inflorescence is a solitary tubular flower around a centimeter long. It has a flat white or pale pink or blue corolla with five lobes each just under a centimeter in length.

== Description ==
Phlox diffusa is a perennial herb subshrub. Its matted to the ground no more than 8 inches tall and its stem is usually prostrate or decumbent to erect. Phlox diffusa has opposite simple pinnate needle like leaves. Flowers are quite showy and range from Lavender to pink in color. Flowers have five petals with a tubular corolla that is fused at the base.

== Habitat ==
Phlox diffusa prefers dry hillsides such as areas like rocky slopes and terrains such as alpine or sub-alpine or pumice fields.

== Distribution ==
Phlox diffusa is widely distributed throughout the western United States going as far east as Nebraska. It spreads northerly to British Columbia in Canada with its Southern limits being Southern California. Specific areas in United States are North Nevada, Idaho along with small areas of Montana and South Dakota along with Arizona, California, Colorado, Idaho, Montana, Nebraska, New Mexico, Nevada, Oregon, South Dakota, Utah, Washington, Wyoming and Nevada mountains.

== Ecology ==
Based on a study at Chowder ridge fell-view community the flower morphology of Phlox diffusa such as flora color and insect visitors dominated the methods they are pollinated. The study showed that due to early blooming of Phlox diffusa, butterflies and bumblebees visited the flowers less frequently than expected but still are considered major pollinators. Two minor pollinators for Phlox diffusa are Muscoid flies and Syrphid flies which both visited significantly less. Evidence from this study points to Phlox diffusa being an important nectar source for early season queen bumblebees. Phlox diffusa is a perennial plant which blossoms early May through Mid August which then goes dormant in November until next spring.
