= Phlox roemeriana =

Scientific classification
- Kingdom: Plantae
- Clade: Tracheophytes
- Clade: Angiosperms
- Clade: Eudicots
- Clade: Asterids
- Order: Ericales
- Family: Polemoniaceae
- Genus: Phlox
- Species: P. roemeriana

Binomial name
- Phlox roemeriana Scheele

Synonyms
- Armeria roemeriana (Scheele) Kuntze; Phlox macrantha Buckley; Phlox roemeriana var. elata Brand

Species of plant

Phlox roemeriana, the goldeneye phlox, is a species of flowering plant in the family Polemoniaceae, native to Texas. There it is found only on dry limestone soils of the Edwards Plateau and nearby areas of the High Plains. An annual reaching 13 cm (5 in), it has pink flowers with a yellow center.
