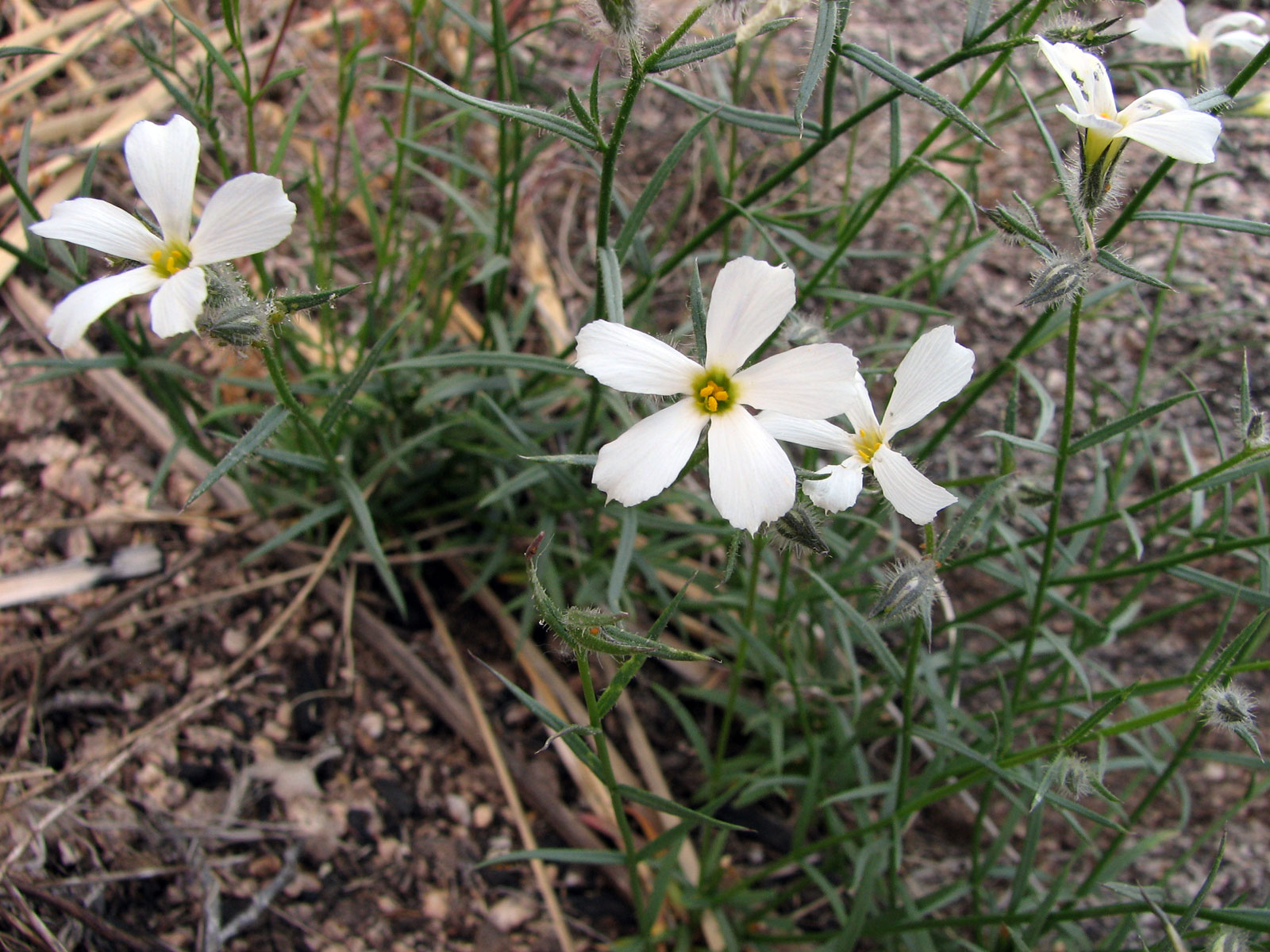

Scientific classification
- Kingdom: Plantae
- Clade: Tracheophytes
- Clade: Angiosperms
- Clade: Eudicots
- Clade: Asterids
- Order: Ericales
- Family: Polemoniaceae
- Genus: Phlox
- Species: P. tenuifolia

Binomial name
- Phlox tenuifolia E.E.Nelson

= Phlox tenuifolia =

Species of flowering plant

Phlox tenuifolia, the Santa Catalina Mountain phlox, is a white flowered plant in the phlox family (Polemoniaceae) that can be found with stems climbing through shrubs and other vegetation growing on rocky slopes of the Sonoran Desert in Arizona. Botanist Richard Spellenberg has described its floral displays over supporting vegetation as "spectacular".
