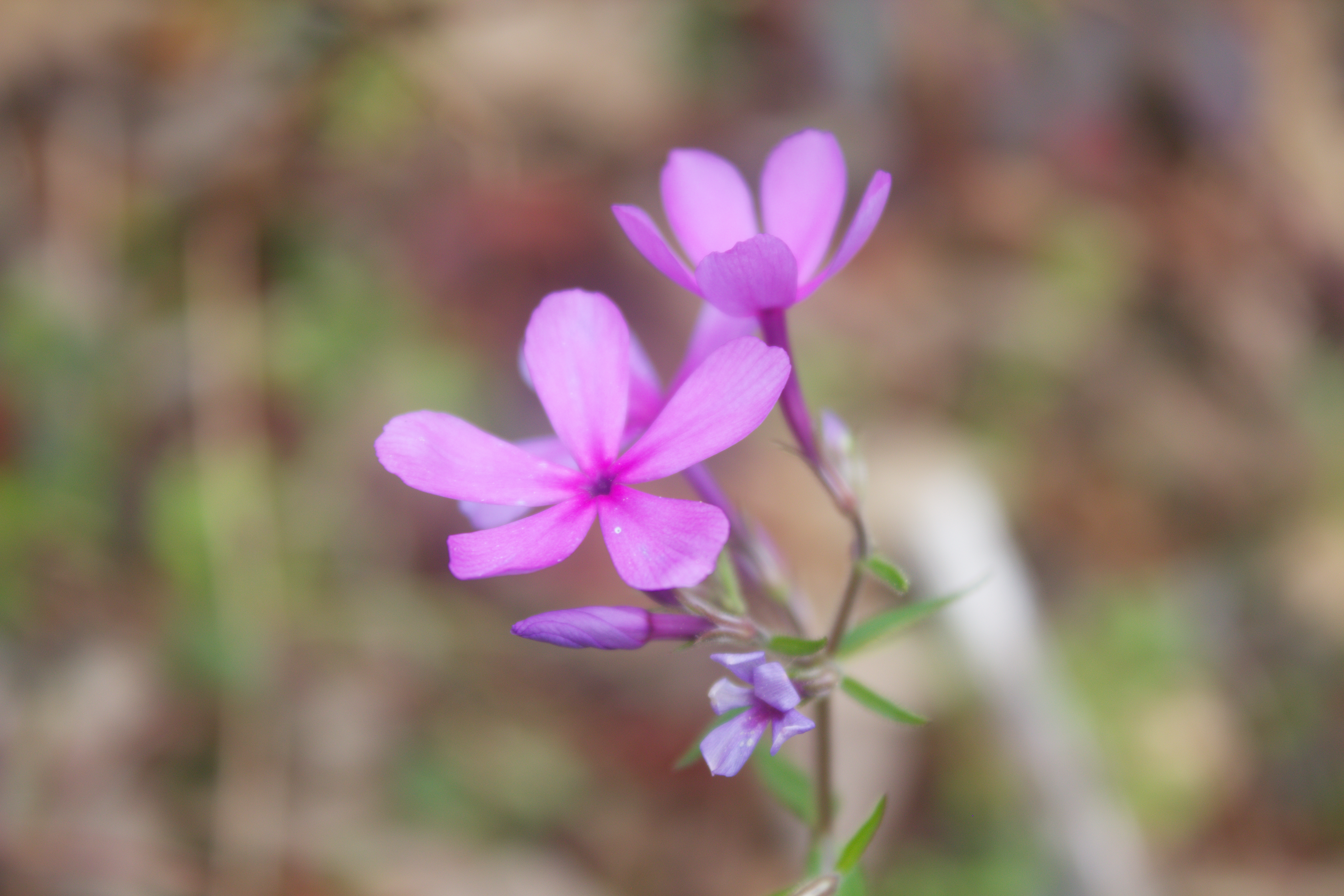

Conservation status
- Vulnerable (NatureServe)

Scientific classification
- Kingdom: Plantae
- Clade: Tracheophytes
- Clade: Angiosperms
- Clade: Eudicots
- Clade: Asterids
- Order: Ericales
- Family: Polemoniaceae
- Genus: Phlox
- Species: P. floridana

Binomial name
- Phlox floridana Benth.

Synonyms
- List: Armeria floridana (Benth.) Kuntze; Phlox floridana subsp. bella Wherry; Phlox floridana var. typica Wherry; Phlox nuttalliana G.Don; Phlox nuttallii Courtois ex Steud.; Phlox pilosa var. floridana (Benth.) Alph.Wood

= Phlox floridana =

Species of flowering plant

Phlox floridana, commonly known as Florida phlox, is a perennial herb endemic to the southeastern region of the United States, occurring in the states of Florida, Georgia, and Alabama. P. floridana is considered to be a facultative upland species, and can be found in habitats such as pine flatwoods, hammocks, and sandhills.

== Description ==
This species may reach a height of up to 30 in (0.76 m) and produces five-petaled blooms that are pink in color.
