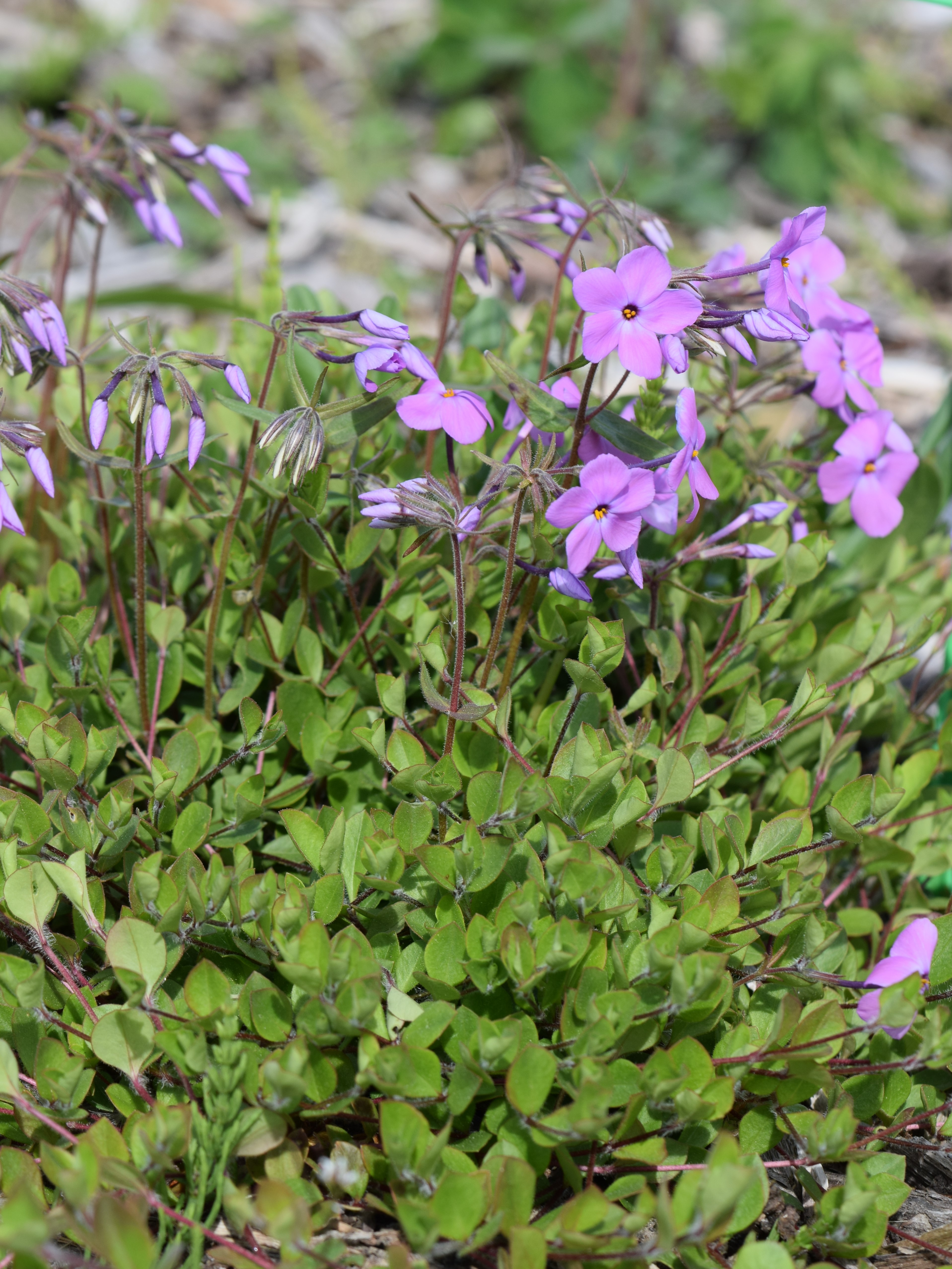

Scientific classification
- Kingdom: Plantae
- Clade: Tracheophytes
- Clade: Angiosperms
- Clade: Eudicots
- Clade: Asterids
- Order: Ericales
- Family: Polemoniaceae
- Genus: Phlox
- Species: P. ovata

Binomial name
- Phlox ovata L.

Synonyms
- List: Armeria ovata (L.) Kuntze; Phlox carolina var. ovata (L.) Benth.; Phlox latifolia Michx.; Phlox montana Raf.; Phlox ovata var. elatior A.Gray; Phlox ovata var. latifolia (Michx.) Wherry; Phlox triflora Sweet

= Phlox ovata =

Species of plant

Phlox ovata (syn. Phlox latifolia), the Allegheny phlox, mountain phlox, or wideflower phlox, is a species of flowering plant in the family Polemoniaceae, native to the eastern United States. A creeping perennial found in open montane woodlands, its taxonomic history has been marked by nomenclatural issues.
