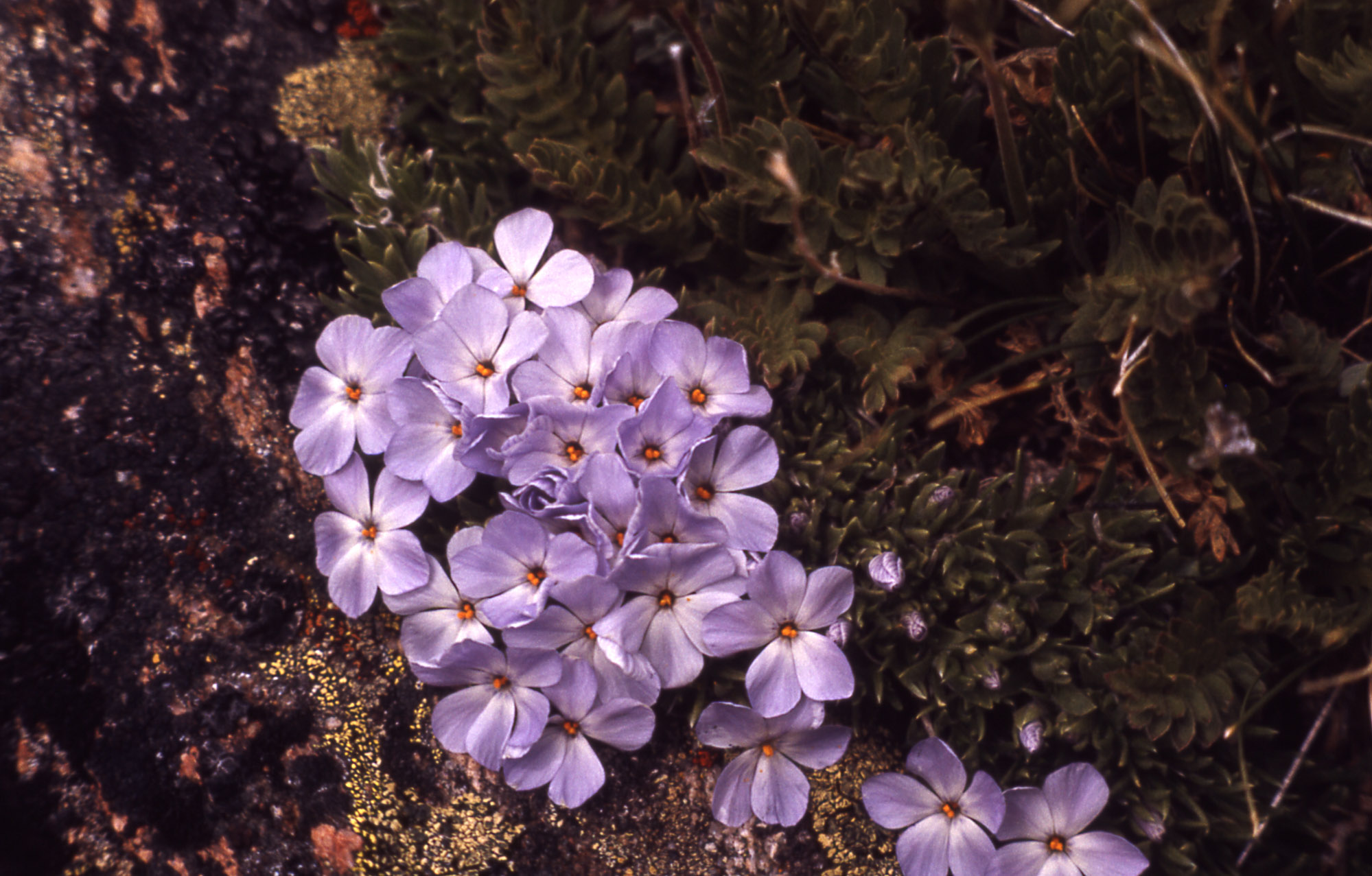

Conservation status
- Secure (NatureServe)

Scientific classification
- Kingdom: Plantae
- Clade: Embryophytes
- Clade: Tracheophytes
- Clade: Angiosperms
- Clade: Eudicots
- Clade: Asterids
- Order: Ericales
- Family: Polemoniaceae
- Genus: Phlox
- Species: P. pulvinata

Binomial name
- Phlox pulvinata (Wherry) Cronquist

Synonyms
- Phlox caespitosa subsp. platyphylla; Phlox caespitosa subsp. pulvinata; Phlox sibirica subsp. pulvinata

= Phlox pulvinata =

Plant species in the phlox family

Phlox pulvinata is a species of phlox known by the common name cushion phlox. It is native to the western United States where it grows in mountain and plateau habitat, in rocky subalpine and alpine climates, including exposed tundra habitat. It is a perennial herb taking a flat, dense, cushionlike form on the ground. Its very short stems are lined with hair-fringed lance-shaped leaves each no more than one centimeter (2/5 in) long. The plant is among the first to flower in the spring in many areas. It blooms densely, forming carpets of flowers. Each white to pale pink flower has a tubular throat up to one centimeter (2/5 in) long and a flat five-lobed corolla.

== Taxonomy ==
Phlox pulvinata was initially described as a subspecies of Phlox caespitosa by Edgar T. Wherry in 1941. It was reclassified as a species in 1959 by the botanist Arthur Cronquist. It is part of the Phlox genus which is classified in the Polemoniaceae family.

=== Names ===
In Botanical Latin the species name, pulvinata, means cushion shaped. It is similarly known by the common name cushion phlox.
