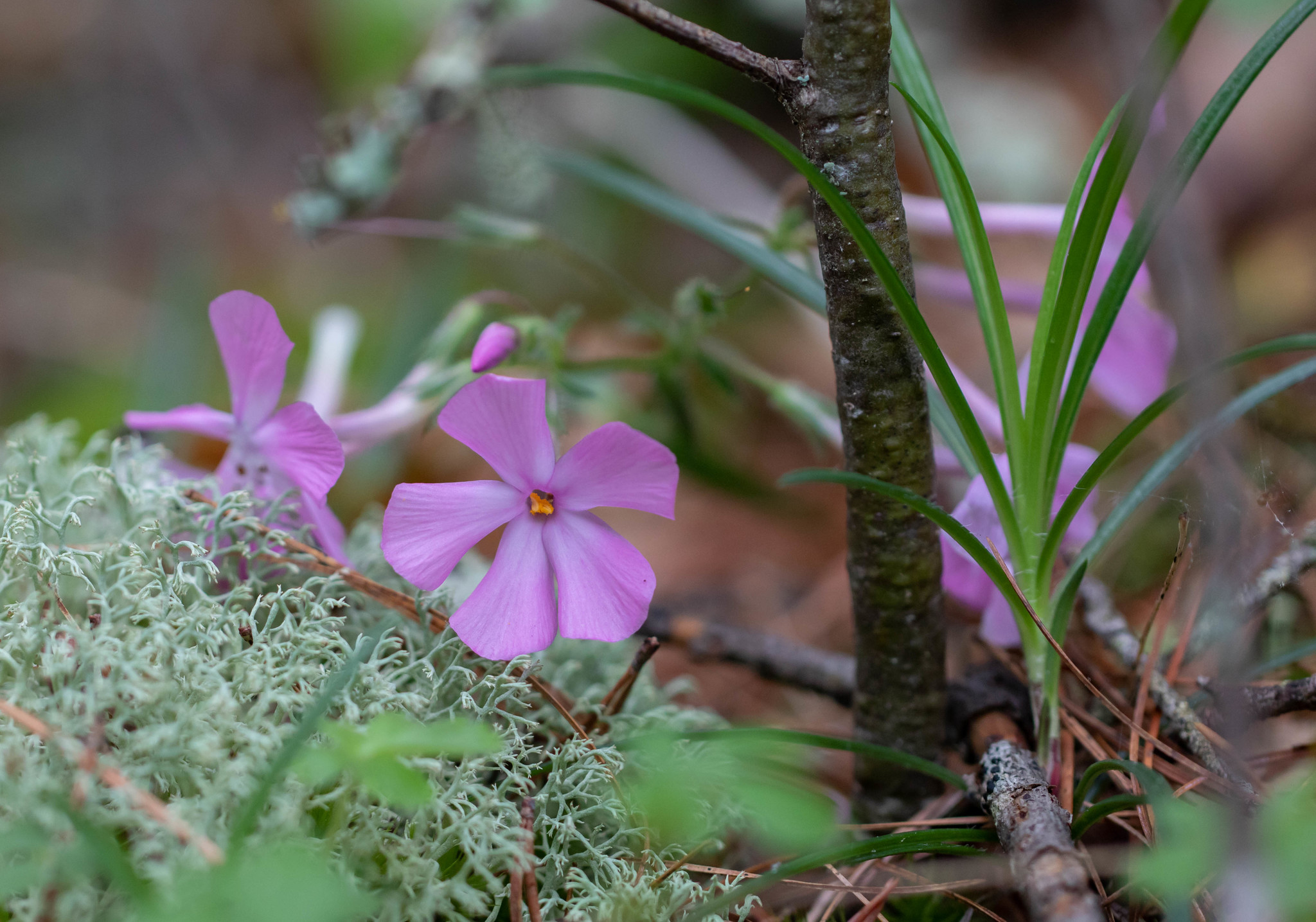

Scientific classification
- Kingdom: Plantae
- Clade: Tracheophytes
- Clade: Angiosperms
- Clade: Eudicots
- Clade: Asterids
- Order: Ericales
- Family: Polemoniaceae
- Genus: Phlox
- Species: P. buckleyi

Binomial name
- Phlox buckleyi Wherry

= Phlox buckleyi =

Species of flowering plant

Phlox buckleyi, common name swordleaf phlox or shale-barren phlox, is a plant species native to Virginia and West Virginia. It grows in open woodlands, primarily on hillsides derived from shale. The first known specimen was first collected in 1838 but not described as a species until 1930.

Phlox buckleyi is a perennial herb spreading by means of stolons running on the surface of the ground. Rosettes of long, narrow, evergreen leaves form at the tips of the stolons, from the center of which arises a vertical stem up to 40 cm (16 inches) tall. Inflorescence is a cyme or a paniculate group of cymes. Flowers are bright purple with lighter purple nearer the center but very dark purple at the very center.
