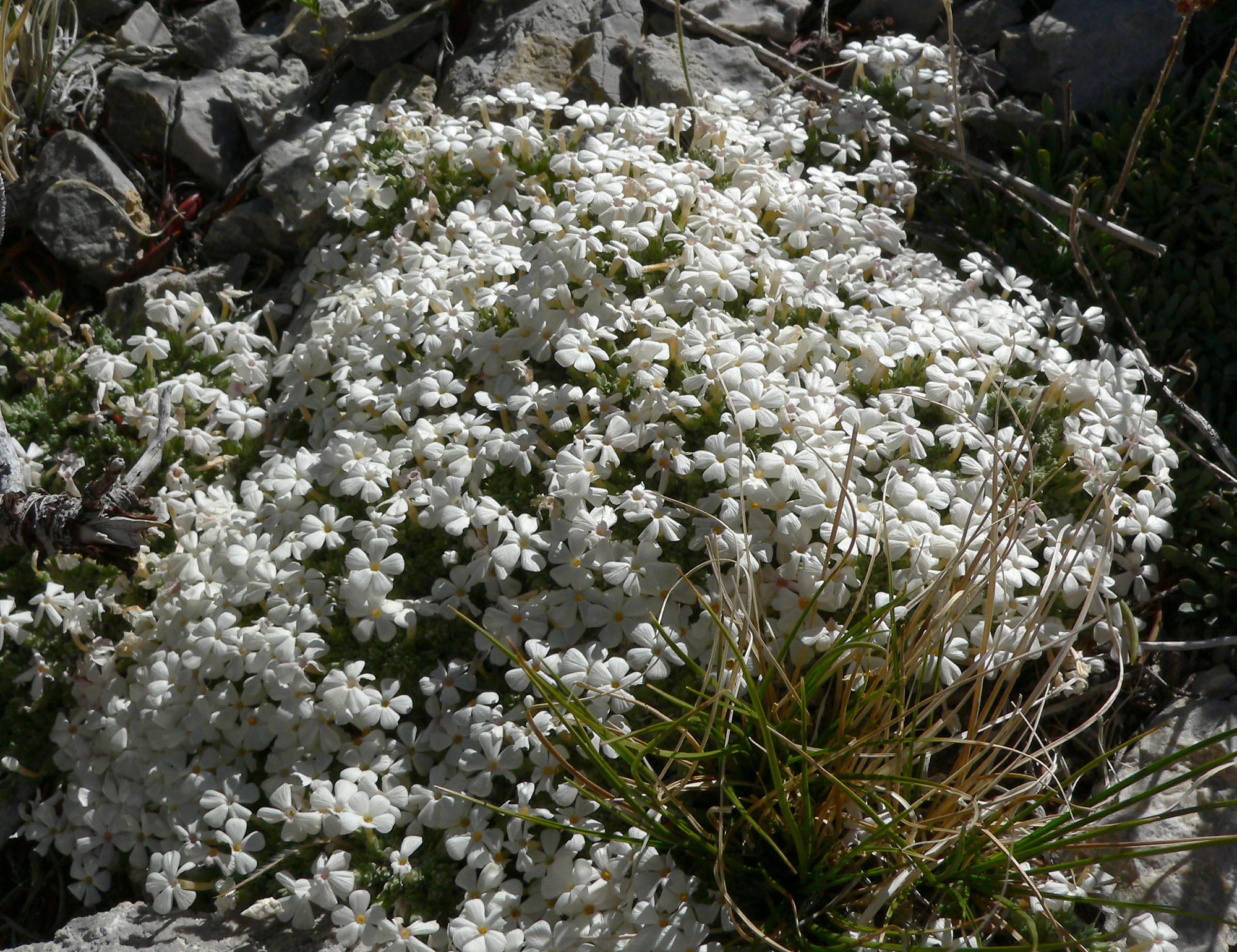

Conservation status
- Apparently Secure (NatureServe)

Scientific classification
- Kingdom: Plantae
- Clade: Embryophytes
- Clade: Tracheophytes
- Clade: Spermatophytes
- Clade: Angiosperms
- Clade: Eudicots
- Clade: Asterids
- Order: Ericales
- Family: Polemoniaceae
- Genus: Phlox
- Species: P. condensata

Binomial name
- Phlox condensata (A.Gray) E.E.Nelson

Subspecies
- P. c. subsp. condensata; P. c. subsp. covillei

Synonyms
- Phlox covillei; Phlox dejecta

= Phlox condensata =

Plant species in the phlox family

Phlox condensata is a species of phlox known by the common name dwarf phlox. It is native to the western United States including eastern California, Nevada, and Colorado, where it grows in rocky, mountainous areas. It is a very compact mat-forming perennial herb growing in patches often less than a centimeter tall. The toothlike lance-shaped leaves are no more than half a centimeter long and lined with stiff hairs. The inflorescence is a solitary tubular flower up to a centimeter long with a flat white or pale pink corolla.

== Taxonomy ==
Phlox condensata was first described by Asa Gray as variety of Phlox caespitosa in 1870. It was recategorized as a species by Elias Emanuel Nelson in 1899, though Edgar T. Wherry disagreed, describing it as a subspecies of Phlox caespitosa in 1941. It is part of the Phlox genus within the wider Polemoniaceae family and has two accepted subspecies.

- Phlox condensata subsp. condensata – Native to California, Nevada, New Mexico, and Colorado
- Phlox condensata subsp. covillei – Native to California and Nevada

Phlox condensata has seven synonyms of the species or subspecies covillei according to Plants of the World Online. However, NatureServe follows an alternate taxonomy with Phlox covillei as a species confined to California and Nevada and Phlox condensata as a Rocky Mountain Species growing in New Mexico, Colorado, and Wyoming.

Table of Synonyms
Name	Year	Rank	Synonym of:	Notes
Phlox caespitosa subsp. condensata (A.Gray) Wherry	1941	subspecies	P. condensata	≡ hom.
Phlox caespitosa var. condensata A.Gray	1870	variety	P. condensata	≡ hom.
Phlox caespitosa var. covillei (E.E.Nelson) Brand	1907	variety	subsp. covillei	≡ hom.
Phlox covillei E.E.Nelson	1899	species	subsp. covillei	≡ hom.
Phlox covillei f. dejecta (A.Nelson & P.B.Kenn.) Wherry	1942	form	subsp. covillei	= het.
Phlox dejecta A.Nelson & P.B.Kenn.	1906	species	subsp. covillei	= het.
Phlox douglasii var. covillei (E.E.Nelson) Jeps.	1943	variety	subsp. covillei	≡ hom.
Notes: ≡ homotypic synonym; = heterotypic synonym
