= Schinia indiana =

Scientific classification
- Domain: Eukaryota
- Kingdom: Animalia
- Phylum: Arthropoda
- Class: Insecta
- Order: Lepidoptera
- Superfamily: Noctuoidea
- Family: Noctuidae
- Genus: Schinia
- Species: S. indiana

Binomial name
- Schinia indiana Smith, 1908

Species of moth

Schinia indiana, or the phlox moth, is a moth of the family Noctuidae. It is found in the Mid-Western United States.

The wingspan is about 17–21 mm.

The larvae feed on Phlox pilosa.
