= Phlox variabilis =

Scientific classification
- Kingdom: Plantae
- Clade: Tracheophytes
- Clade: Angiosperms
- Clade: Eudicots
- Clade: Asterids
- Order: Ericales
- Family: Polemoniaceae
- Genus: Phlox
- Species: P. variabilis

Binomial name
- Phlox variabilis Brand

Synonyms
- Phlox aspera E.E.Nelson; Phlox drummondii subvar. aspera (E.E.Nelson) Brand; Phlox kelseyi subsp. variabilis (Brand) Wherry; Phlox pilosa subsp. latisepala Wherry

Species of plant

Phlox variabilis, the variegated phlox, is a species of flowering plant in the family Polemoniaceae, native to the U.S. states of Idaho, Montana, Wyoming, Utah and Texas. A mat-forming perennial reaching 10 cm (4 in), it is found in a variety of habitats that have limited competition from other plants.

== Subtaxa ==
The following subspecies are accepted:

- Phlox variabilis subsp. latisepala (Wherry) Locklear – Texas
- Phlox variabilis subsp. nudata Wherry – Montana
- Phlox variabilis subsp. variabilis – Idaho, Montana, Utah, Wyoming
