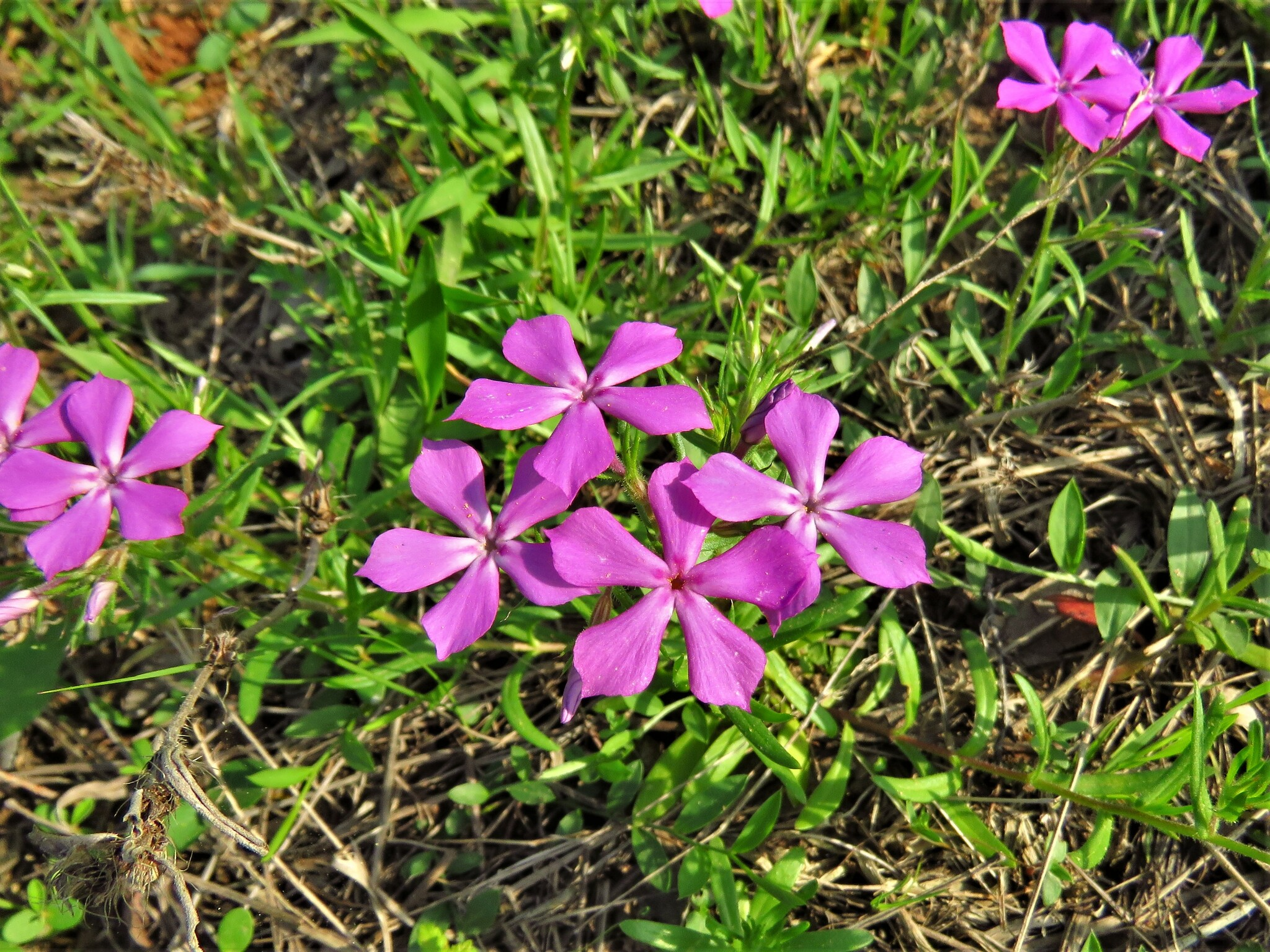
- In Texas

Scientific classification
- Kingdom: Plantae
- Clade: Tracheophytes
- Clade: Angiosperms
- Clade: Eudicots
- Clade: Asterids
- Order: Ericales
- Family: Polemoniaceae
- Genus: Phlox
- Species: P. cuspidata

Binomial name
- Phlox cuspidata Scheele

Synonyms
- Phlox cuspidata var. grandiflora Whitehouse; Phlox cuspidata var. humilis Whitehouse; Phlox cuspidata var. typica Whitehouse; Phlox drummondii var. tenuis A.Gray; Phlox tenuis (A.Gray) E.E.Nelson

= Phlox cuspidata =

Species of plant

Phlox cuspidata, the pointed phlox, is a species of flowering plant in the family Polemoniaceae, native to the US states of Oklahoma, Texas, and Louisiana. An annual reaching 25 cm (10 in), its hybridization dynamics with and partial reproductive isolation from Phlox drummondii are the subject of scientific inquiry.
