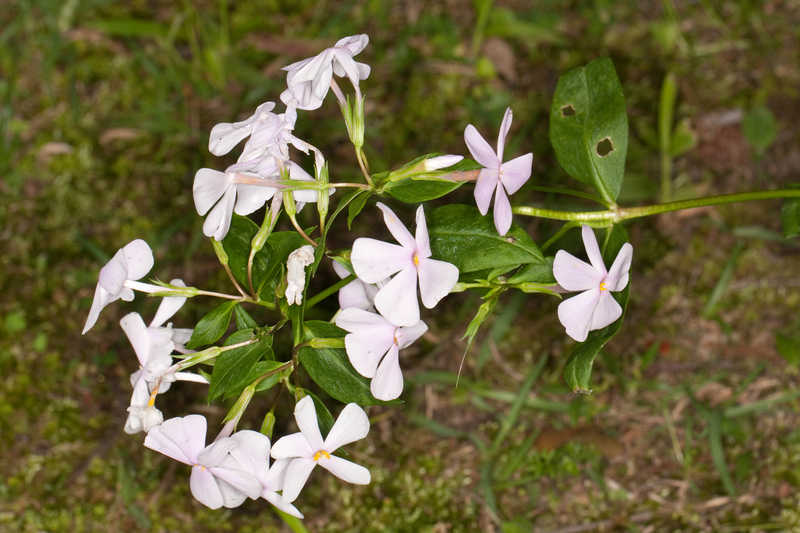

Conservation status
- Critically Imperiled (NatureServe)

Scientific classification
- Kingdom: Plantae
- Clade: Tracheophytes
- Clade: Angiosperms
- Clade: Eudicots
- Clade: Asterids
- Order: Ericales
- Family: Polemoniaceae
- Genus: Phlox
- Species: P. pulchra

Binomial name
- Phlox pulchra Wherry (1955)

= Phlox pulchra =

Species of flowering plant

Phlox pulchra, commonly known as Wherry's phlox or Alabama phlox, is a perennial species of flowering plant in the family Polemoniacea. It is endemic to Alabama in the United States and historic to nine counties (Autauga, Bibb, Butler, Jackson, Jefferson, Lawrence, Shelby, Tuscaloosa, and Walker) Some occurrences are greatly diminished in size or extirpated, others have not been officially surveyed since the 1980s. Specimens have been vouchered in at least five of these counties. It was originally collected by Dr. Wherry in 1929 in Walker County and thought to be Phlox ovata. Under his cultivation, it was observed to differ as follows: sterile shoot present with partially evergreen leaves, small number of nodes on flowering shoots, large calyx and corolla. He published his findings in the journal Bartonia in 1934. The plant was collected in Walker County by Weezie Smith for Dr. Wherry prior to the publication of his book, The Genus Phlox, in 1955, which details the taxa. The showy, compact flowers bloom in May and June in a color spectrum from bright pink, delicate rose to soft peach and occasionally white. Phlox pulchra, for this reason, has horticulture appeal and is available as “Bibb Pink” and “Eco Pale Moon” cultivars.

== Description ==
Both flowering and sterile shoots arise from the same rhizomes. The erect flowering stems are green in color and glabrous in texture, 12–18 inches in height; the sprawling sterile stem is 6–8 inches in height. Stem leaves are opposite in placement, elliptic to oblong in shape, glabrous, with entire margins and have short, clasping petioles or are sessile. Basal internodes are shorter than the distal internodes. Sterile stem leaves are crowded. Bright pink to white fragrant flowers form a terminal cyme. Their narrow tube is composed of 5 linear-lanceolate fused sepals. Corolla is salverform with narrow tube and spreading lobes. Some stamens extend beyond the tube. Fruit is capsular.

== Habitat ==
Alabama phlox occurs on roadsides and within forests openings with mixed pines, oak, hickory, vaccinium and hydrangea and on also on powerline right of ways. Soils tend to be well drained sandy loam. Occurrences are most frequent in areas that have been logged or burned.

== Conservation ==
Alabama phlox is listed as a S1 species in Alabama (typically 5 or fewer occurrences, very few remaining individuals, acres, or miles of stream, or some factor of its biology making it especially vulnerable in the state.), and globally as a G1 species (critically imperiled). It is not protected under the US Endangered Species Act. This species is currently protected and properly managed only within the Cahaba River National Wildlife Refuge, Bibb County, Alabama. Fire and forest clearing are supportive conservation methods. Plant loss is due to invasive species competition, commercial exploitation, urbanization, and grazing.
