= Phlox dolichantha =

Conservation status
- Imperiled (NatureServe)

Scientific classification
- Kingdom: Plantae
- Clade: Tracheophytes
- Clade: Angiosperms
- Clade: Eudicots
- Clade: Asterids
- Order: Ericales
- Family: Polemoniaceae
- Genus: Phlox
- Species: P. dolichantha

Binomial name
- Phlox dolichantha A.Gray

Species of flowering plant

Phlox dolichantha is a species of phlox known by the common name Big Bear Valley phlox. It is endemic to San Bernardino County, California, where it is limited to the area around Big Bear Lake in the San Bernardino Mountains. It grows in forests and the unique local pebble plain habitat. It occurs at elevations over 2,000 meters (6,600 ft). It is an erect, branching perennial herb growing up to 30 centimeters (12 in) tall. The linear or narrowly lance-shaped leaves are 2 to 5 centimeters (0.79 to 1.97 in) long and are oppositely arranged on the slender stems. The inflorescence is made up of one or more showy flowers at the tip of the stem. Each flower has a very slender tubular throat up to 5 centimeters (2.0 in) long which can be white, pink, or lavender.

The flowers are pollinated by a variety of insects including the hawkmoth Hyles lineata and flies of the genera Anthomyia and Tachypeza.
