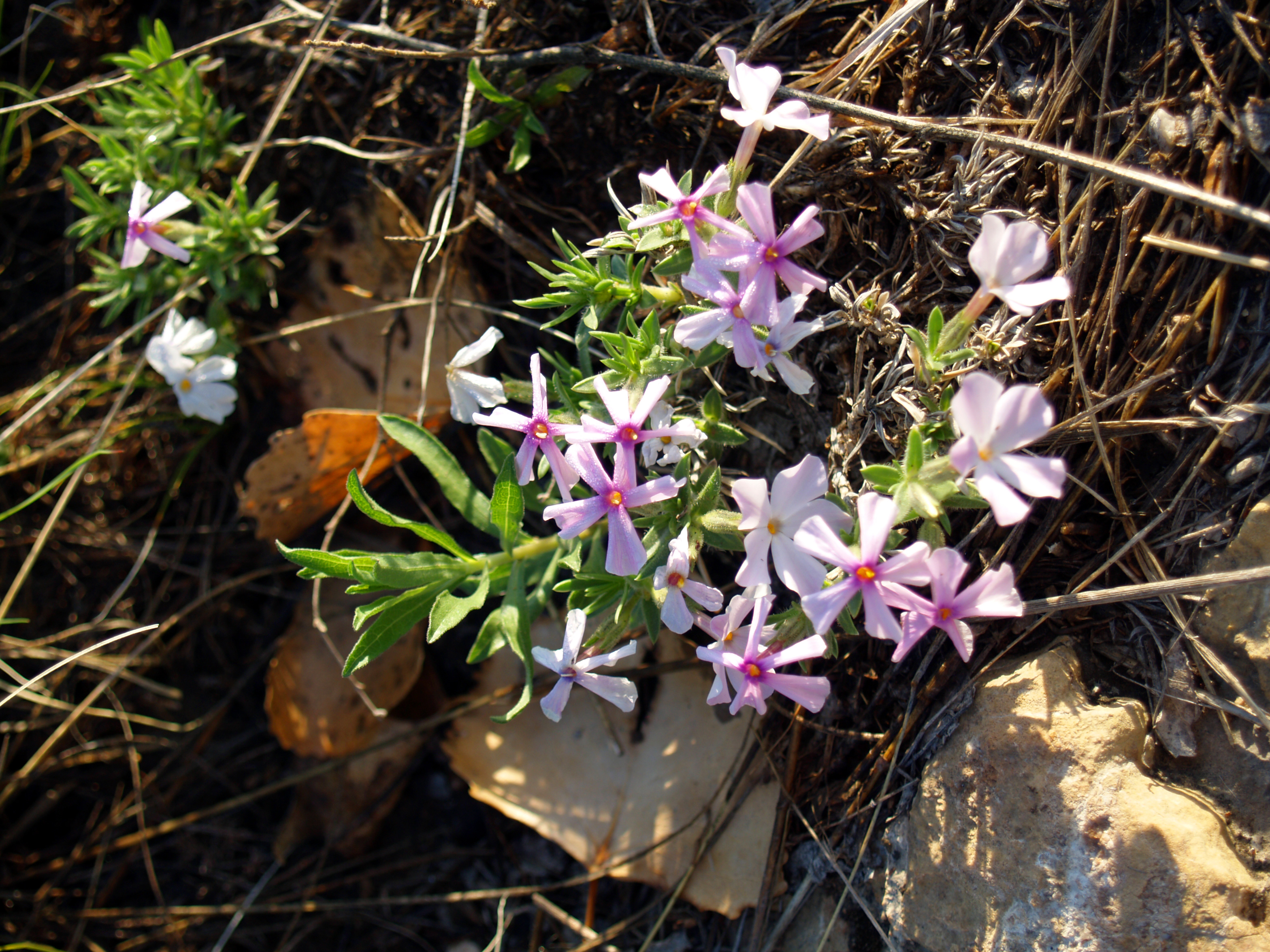

Scientific classification
- Kingdom: Plantae
- Clade: Tracheophytes
- Clade: Angiosperms
- Clade: Eudicots
- Clade: Asterids
- Order: Ericales
- Family: Polemoniaceae
- Genus: Phlox
- Species: P. alyssifolia

Binomial name
- Phlox alyssifolia Greene

= Phlox alyssifolia =

Species of flowering plant

Phlox alyssifolia, the alyssum-leaved phlox, is a flowering plant in the genus Phlox. It is native to central North America.

== Range and habitat ==
Alyssum-leaved phlox is native to the grasslands of Wyoming, Montana, Nebraska, and the Dakotas. Its range also extends into the prairie provinces of Canada. Its preferred habitat is dry grassland.

== Description ==
Alyssum-leaved phlox grows many tough, tufted branches that only reach 2 to 4 inches in height. The flowers are borne on the branch tips in May. The five-petaled flowers are white, sometimes tinted pale pink or purple.
