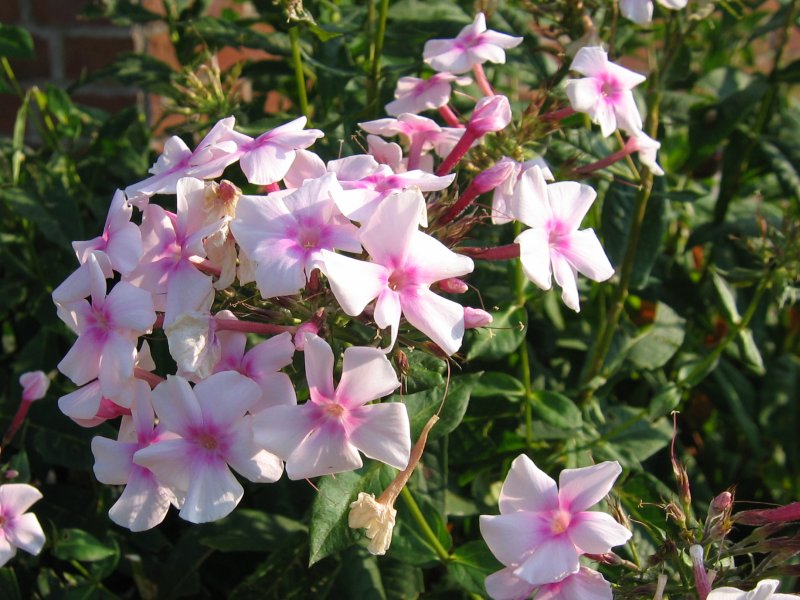
- Cultivar 'Eva Cullum'

Conservation status
- Secure (NatureServe)

Scientific classification
- Kingdom: Plantae
- Clade: Embryophytes
- Clade: Tracheophytes
- Clade: Spermatophytes
- Clade: Angiosperms
- Clade: Eudicots
- Clade: Asterids
- Order: Ericales
- Family: Polemoniaceae
- Genus: Phlox
- Species: P. paniculata

Binomial name
- Phlox paniculata L. (1753)

= Phlox paniculata =

Species of flowering plant

Phlox paniculata is a species of flowering plant in the phlox family (Polemoniaceae). It is native to parts of the eastern and central United States. It is extensively cultivated in temperate regions as an ornamental plant and has become established in the wild in scattered locales in other regions. Common names include fall phlox, garden phlox, perennial phlox, summer phlox, and panicled phlox.

== Description ==
Phlox paniculata is an erect herbaceous perennial growing to 120 cm (47 in) tall by 100 cm (39 in) wide, with opposite, simple leaves on slender green stems. The flowers are 1.5–2.5 cm (0.6–1.0 in) in diameter, often strongly fragrant and borne in summer through fall (autumn). The flowers are grouped in panicles (with many branching stems), hence the specific epithet paniculata. Typical flower colors in wild populations are pink or purple (rarely white).

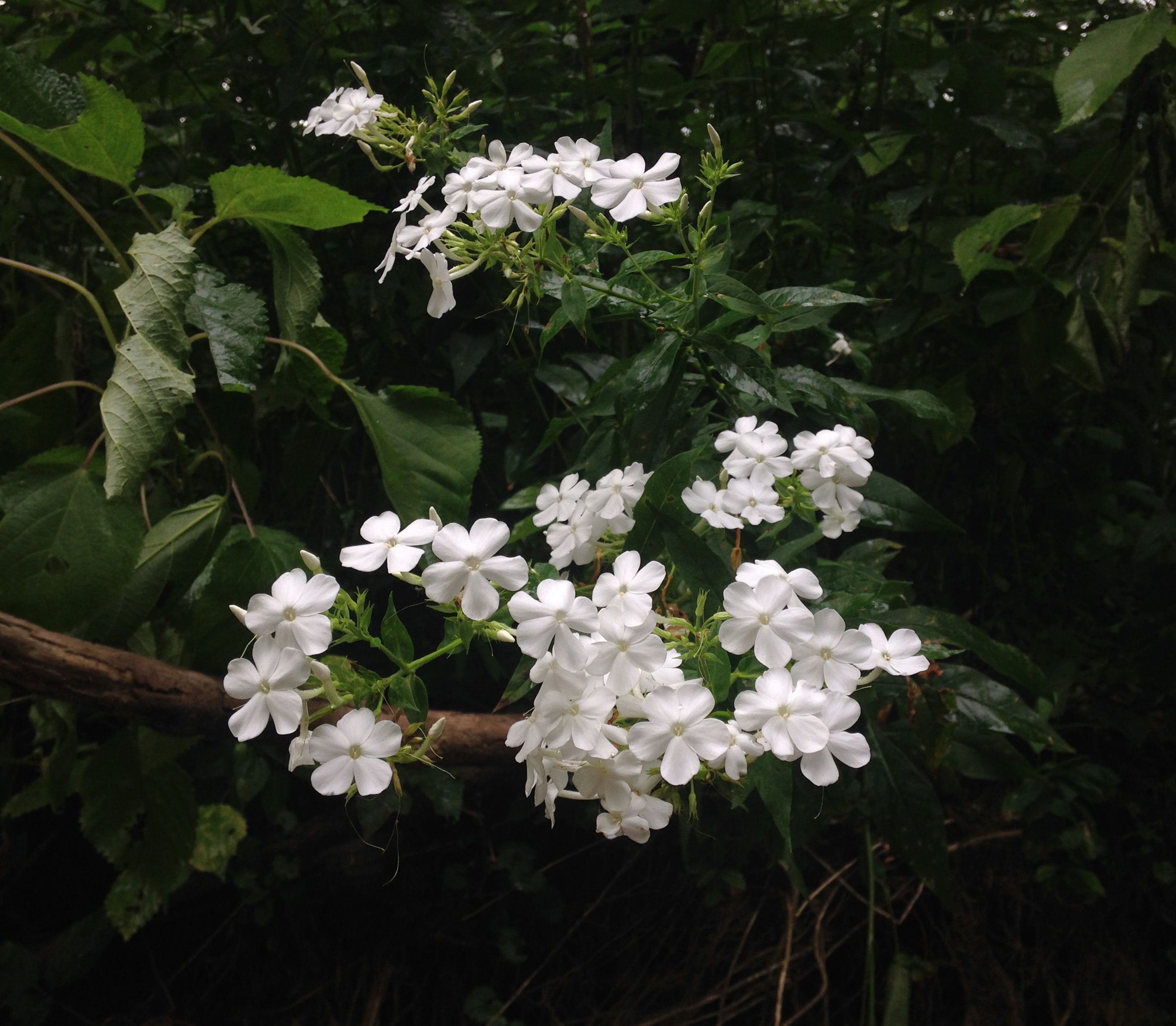
Pure white wild population

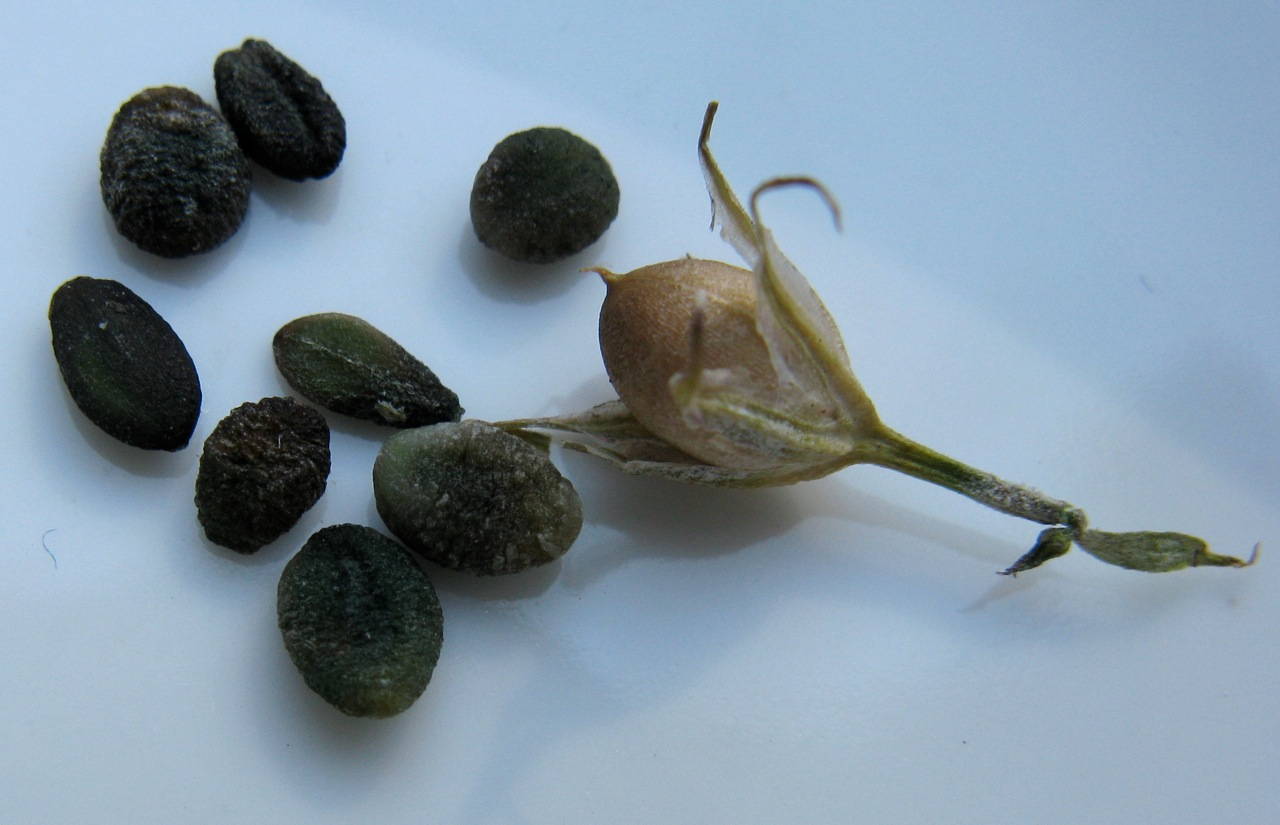
Fruit and seeds

== Distribution and habitat ==
Fall phlox is native to parts of the central and eastern United States. It occurs as an introduced species in other parts of the United States, Canada,, Europe, and Asia. In the Chicago Region, it is questionably native, or native populations may have all been destroyed: "populations in our area appear to be escapes from gardens to nearby woods and waste ground, which no doubt accounts for all collections since 1945".

In its natural range, it grows along stream banks and in moist wooded areas.

== Cultivation ==
Phlox paniculata is grown largely for its showy fragrant flowers in high summer. It requires a sheltered spot with full sun or partial shade, in fertile moist soil. Plants may be propagated by division or root cuttings in autumn, or by basal cuttings in spring.

Plants make excellent cut flowers. In hot, dry areas they are sensitive to powdery mildew, and affected stems should be removed immediately.

=== Cultivars ===
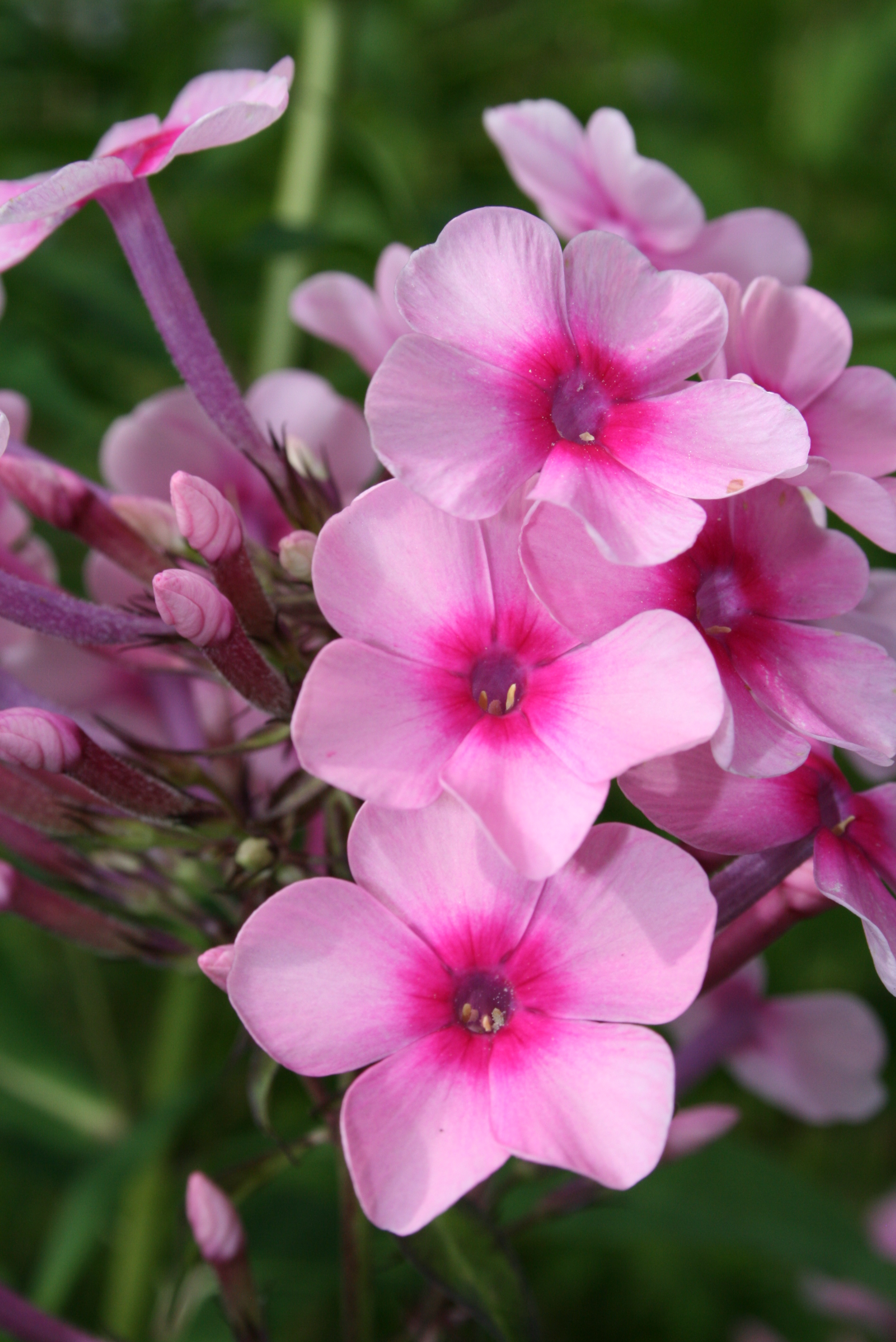
Phlox paniculata 'Miss Pepper'

Many cultivars have been developed for garden use. The following have gained the Royal Horticultural Society's Award of Garden Merit:

- 'Alba Grandiflora' (white)
- 'Becky Towe' (pink, variegated leaves)
- 'Danielle' (white)
- 'David' (white)
- 'Eva Cullum' (deep pink)
- 'Eva Foerster' (pink/white)
- 'Flamingo' (bright pink)
- 'Franz Schubert' (pale pink/purple)
- 'Grenadine Dream' (red/purple)
- 'Grey Lady' (lavender-grey)
- 'Luc's Lilac'
- 'Le Mahdi' (violet blue)
- 'Miss Elie' (pink)
- 'Miss Mary' (deep pink)
- 'Miss Pepper' (pale pink/deep pink)
- 'Monica Lynden-Bell' (pale pink)
- 'Mother of Pearl' (pearl white)
- 'Norah Leigh' (pale/dark pink, variegated)
- Peacock Cherry Red'
- Peacock Lilac
- Peacock Neon Purple
- Peacock White
- 'Prince of Orange' (orange-red)
- 'Prospero' (lilac/white)
- Purple Eye Flame (purple/white)
- 'Rosa Pastell' (pale pink)
- 'Starfire' (crimson)
- 'Uspekh' (violet/white)
- 'Utopia' (pale pink)
- 'Velvet Flame' (purple/white)
- 'Visions' (pale/medium pink)
- 'White Admiral' (white)

== Uses ==
The plant has been used medicinally, with the leaf extract serving as a laxative and to treat boils.

== Bibliography ==
- "How to propagate phlox". Gardeners' World. BBC. 24 September 2019.
