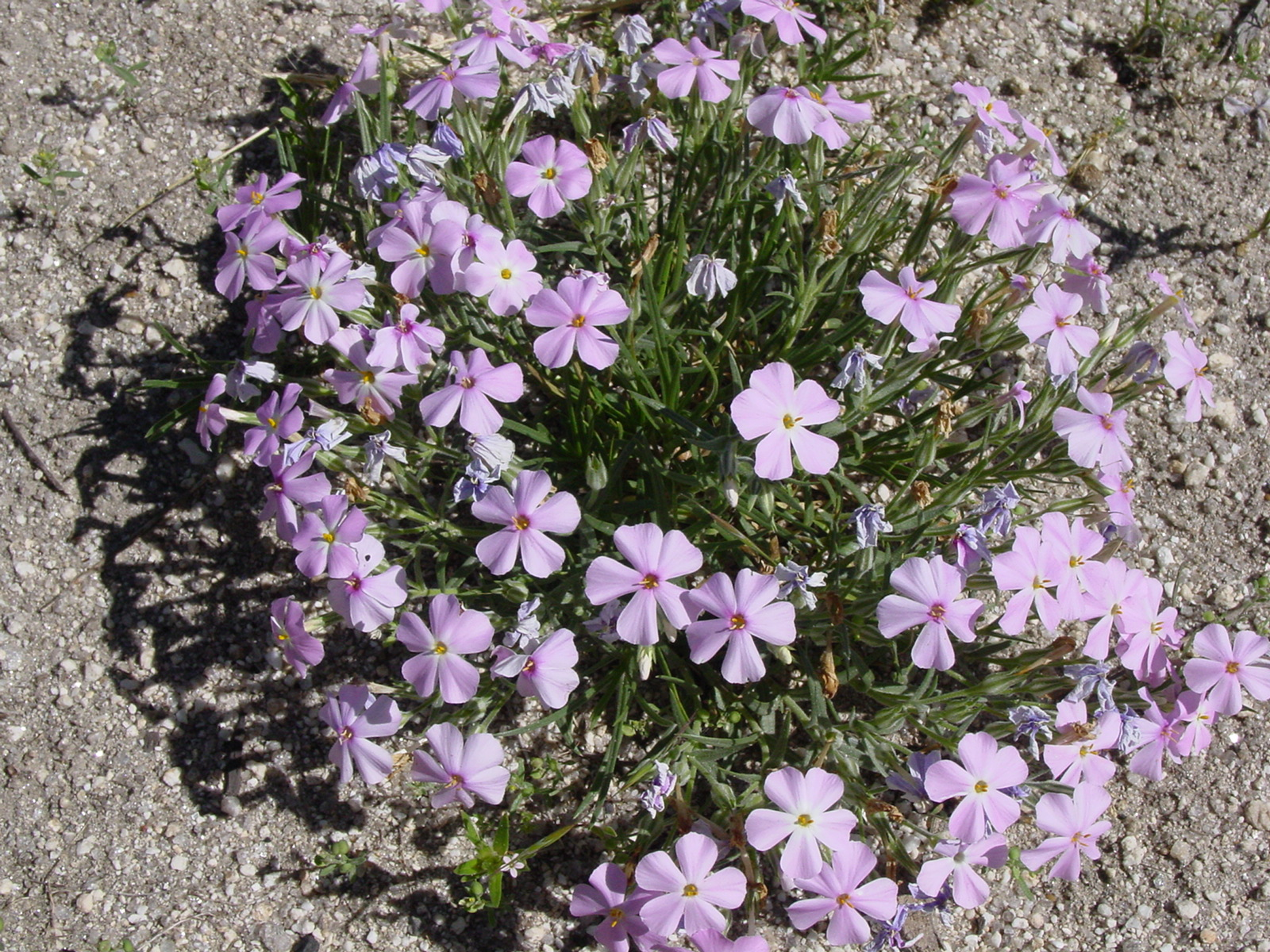
- Habit
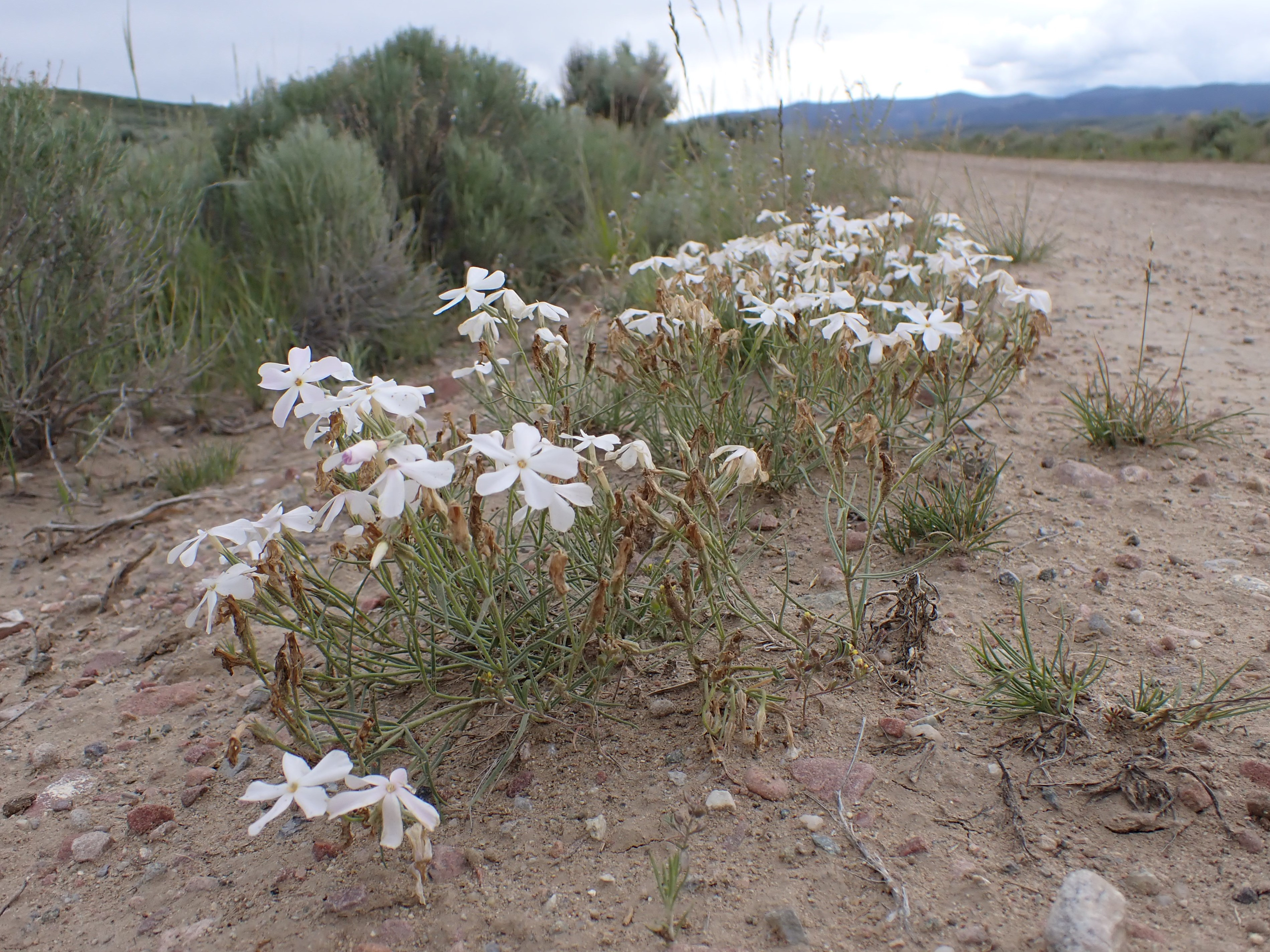
- White-flowered individuals

Conservation status
- Secure (NatureServe)

Scientific classification
- Kingdom: Plantae
- Clade: Embryophytes
- Clade: Tracheophytes
- Clade: Spermatophytes
- Clade: Angiosperms
- Clade: Eudicots
- Clade: Asterids
- Order: Ericales
- Family: Polemoniaceae
- Genus: Phlox
- Species: P. longifolia

Binomial name
- Phlox longifolia Nutt.

Synonyms
- List: Armeria linearifolia (Hook.) Kuntze; Phlox cernua E.E.Nelson; Phlox cortezana A.Nelson; Phlox grahamii Wherry; Phlox humilis Douglas ex Benth.; Phlox linearifolia (Hook.) A.Gray; Phlox linearifolia var. longipes M.E.Jones; Phlox longifolia subsp. calva Wherry; Phlox longifolia var. calva (Wherry) M.Peck; Phlox longifolia subsp. compacta (Brand) Wherry; Phlox longifolia var. compacta (Brand) M.Peck; Phlox longifolia subsp. cortezana (A.Nelson) Wherry; Phlox longifolia var. filifolia A.Nelson; Phlox longifolia subsp. humilis (Douglas ex Benth.) Wherry; Phlox longifolia var. humilis (Douglas ex Benth.) Brand; Phlox longifolia f. humilis (Douglas ex Benth.) Voss; Phlox longifolia var. linearifolia (Hook.) Brand; Phlox longifolia subsp. longipes (M.E.Jones) Wherry; Phlox longifolia var. longipes (M.E.Jones) M.Peck; Phlox longifolia subsp. marginata Brand; Phlox longifolia var. puberula E.E.Nelson; Phlox longifolia subsp. typica Wherry; Phlox puberula (E.E.Nelson) A.Nelson; Phlox speciosa var. linearifolia Hook.; Phlox stansburyi subsp. compacta Brand; Phlox stansburyi var. puberula (E.E.Nelson) Brand; Phlox tenuis Wooton & Standl.; Phlox viridis subsp. compacta (Brand) Wherry; Phlox viridis subsp. longipes (M.E.Jones) Wherry; Phlox visenda A.Nelson

= Phlox longifolia =

Plant species in the phlox family

Phlox longifolia, the longleaf phlox, is a species of flowering plant in the family Polemoniaceae. It is native to British Columbia and the western and west-central United States, but is absent west of the Cascades. A perennial subshrub reaching 15 in (38 cm) but usually shorter, it is typically found in dry, open situations such as slopes, rocky areas, and plains.

== Taxonomy ==
Phlox longifolia was scientifically described and given its scientific name by Thomas Nuttall in 1834. It is classified in the Phlox genus and the Polemoniaceae family. The species has 30 botanical synonyms, of which nine are species names that are heterotypic synonyms.

Table of Synonyms
Name	Year	Notes
Armeria linearifolia (Hook.) Kuntze	1891	
Phlox cernua E.E.Nelson	1899	
Phlox cortezana A.Nelson	1931	
Phlox grahamii Wherry	1943	
Phlox humilis Douglas ex Benth.	1845	
Phlox linearifolia (Hook.) A.Gray	1878	
Phlox puberula (E.E.Nelson) A.Nelson	1909	
Phlox tenuis Wooton & Standl.	1913	nom. illeg. homonym. post.
Phlox visenda A.Nelson	1931	
