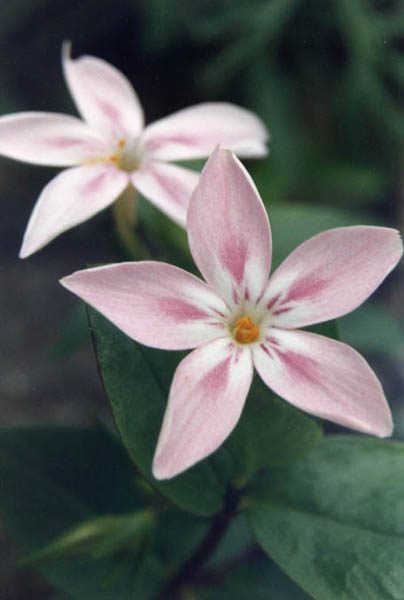

Conservation status
- Apparently Secure (NatureServe)

Scientific classification
- Kingdom: Plantae
- Clade: Tracheophytes
- Clade: Angiosperms
- Clade: Eudicots
- Clade: Asterids
- Order: Ericales
- Family: Polemoniaceae
- Genus: Phlox
- Species: P. adsurgens

Binomial name
- Phlox adsurgens Torr. ex A.Gray

Synonyms
- Armeria adsurgens (Torr. ex A.Gray) Kuntze

= Phlox adsurgens =

Species of flowering plant

Phlox adsurgens, the northern phlox, is a species of flowering plant in the family Polemoniaceae. It is native to the United States, in Oregon and a section of the northern Coast Ranges of California, where it belongs to the flora in forested and wooded mountain habitat. This decumbent herbaceous perennial has erect branches up to 30 cm (1 ft) long. The oval leaves are 1 to 3 cm (2/5 to 1 1/5 in) long and oppositely arranged in pairs. The inflorescence is a cluster of five-lobed pink flowers.

It has gained the Royal Horticultural Society's Award of Garden Merit.

The Latin specific epithet adsurgens means "rising upwards".
