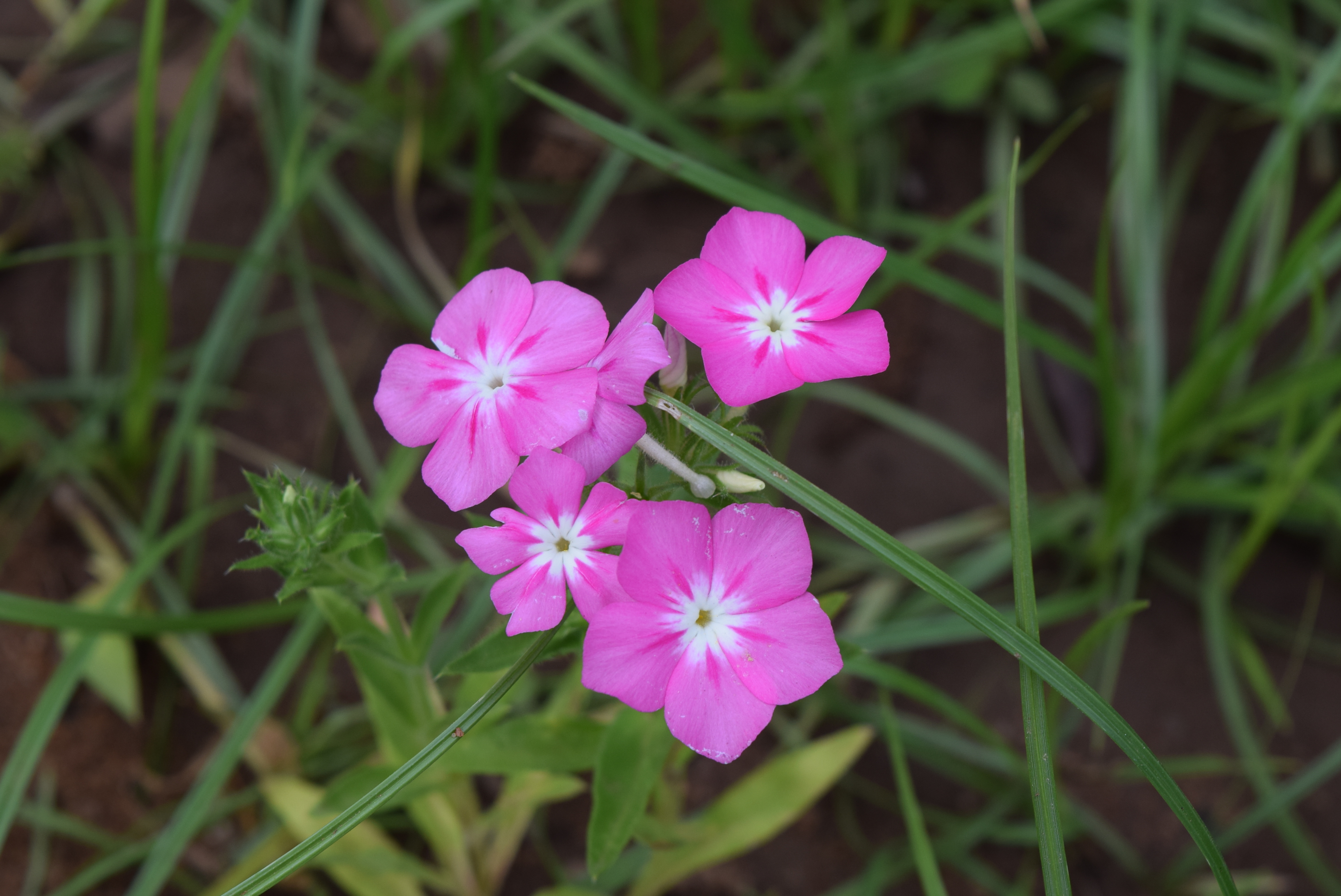

Scientific classification
- Kingdom: Plantae
- Clade: Tracheophytes
- Clade: Angiosperms
- Clade: Eudicots
- Clade: Asterids
- Order: Ericales
- Family: Polemoniaceae
- Genus: Phlox
- Species: P. drummondii

Binomial name
- Phlox drummondii Hook.

= Phlox drummondii =

Species of flowering plant

Phlox drummondii (commonly annual phlox or Drummond's phlox) is a flowering plant in the genus Phlox of the family Polemoniaceae. Native to Texas, it is also widely distributed in the southeastern United States, especially along public highways. P. drummondii is often used as an ornamental plant. The flowers have a wide range of colours "from white and cream through pinks, lilacs, roses, purples and reds, to almost black".

Phlox drummondii is named after Scottish botanist Thomas Drummond, who sent it and a variety of other plant samples back to Britain following his 1833–1835 expedition to Texas.

== Description ==
It is an annual, growing from seed each year. The branches have sharp, pointed, lengthy, ciliated leaves with rounded flowers. The flowers are single or double, with lightly scented, flat, star-shaped petals. The flowers mature to 2.5 cm (1 in) in diameter. It tolerates cold weather well, but requires plentiful watering and dislikes drought, wind and heat. The plant attracts hummingbirds and butterflies, which includes its main pollinator responsible for approximately 80% of pollinator visits, Battus philenor.

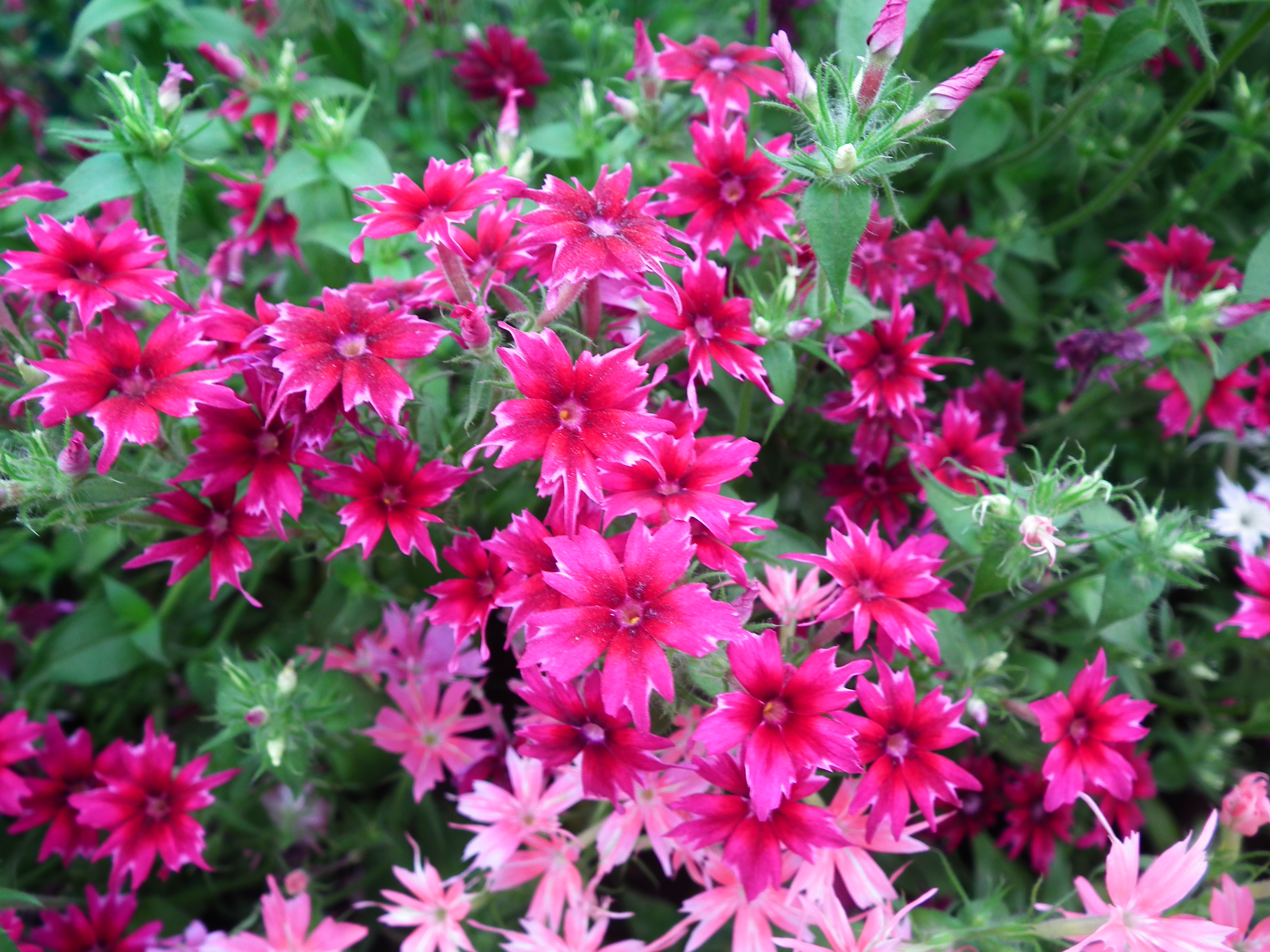
P. drummondii 'Twinkle Star' mixture
