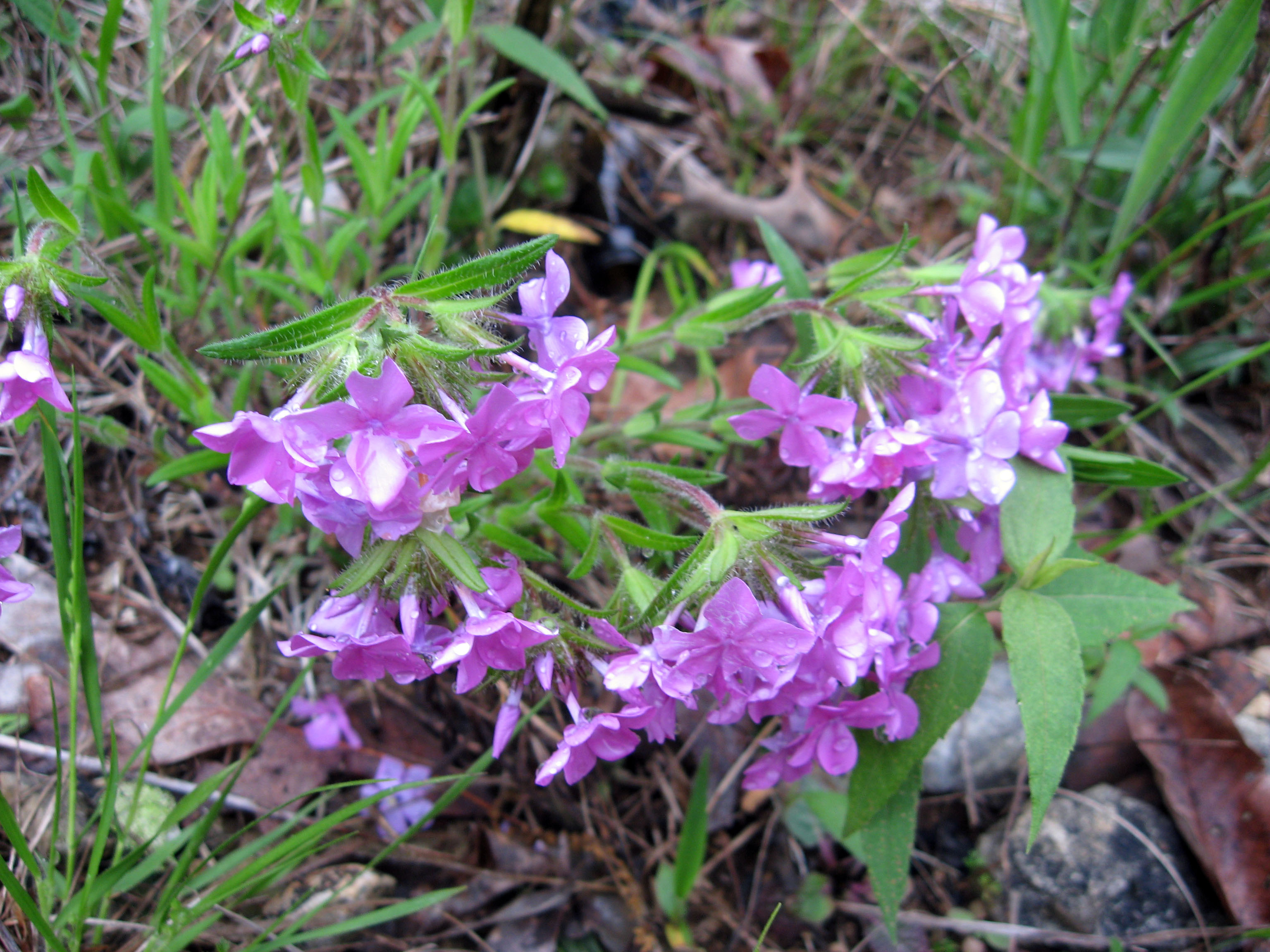

Scientific classification
- Kingdom: Plantae
- Clade: Tracheophytes
- Clade: Angiosperms
- Clade: Eudicots
- Clade: Asterids
- Order: Ericales
- Family: Polemoniaceae
- Genus: Phlox
- Species: P. amoena

Binomial name
- Phlox amoena Sims

= Phlox amoena =

Species of flowering plant

Phlox amoena, commonly called hairy phlox, is a flowering plant in the phlox family. It is native to the Southeastern United States where it is found in sandhills, dry woodlands, and open areas with native vegetation.

It is a perennial that produces purple-pink flowers in the spring. It is distinguished from the similar-looking Phlox pilosa by its more compact and non-glandular flowers.
