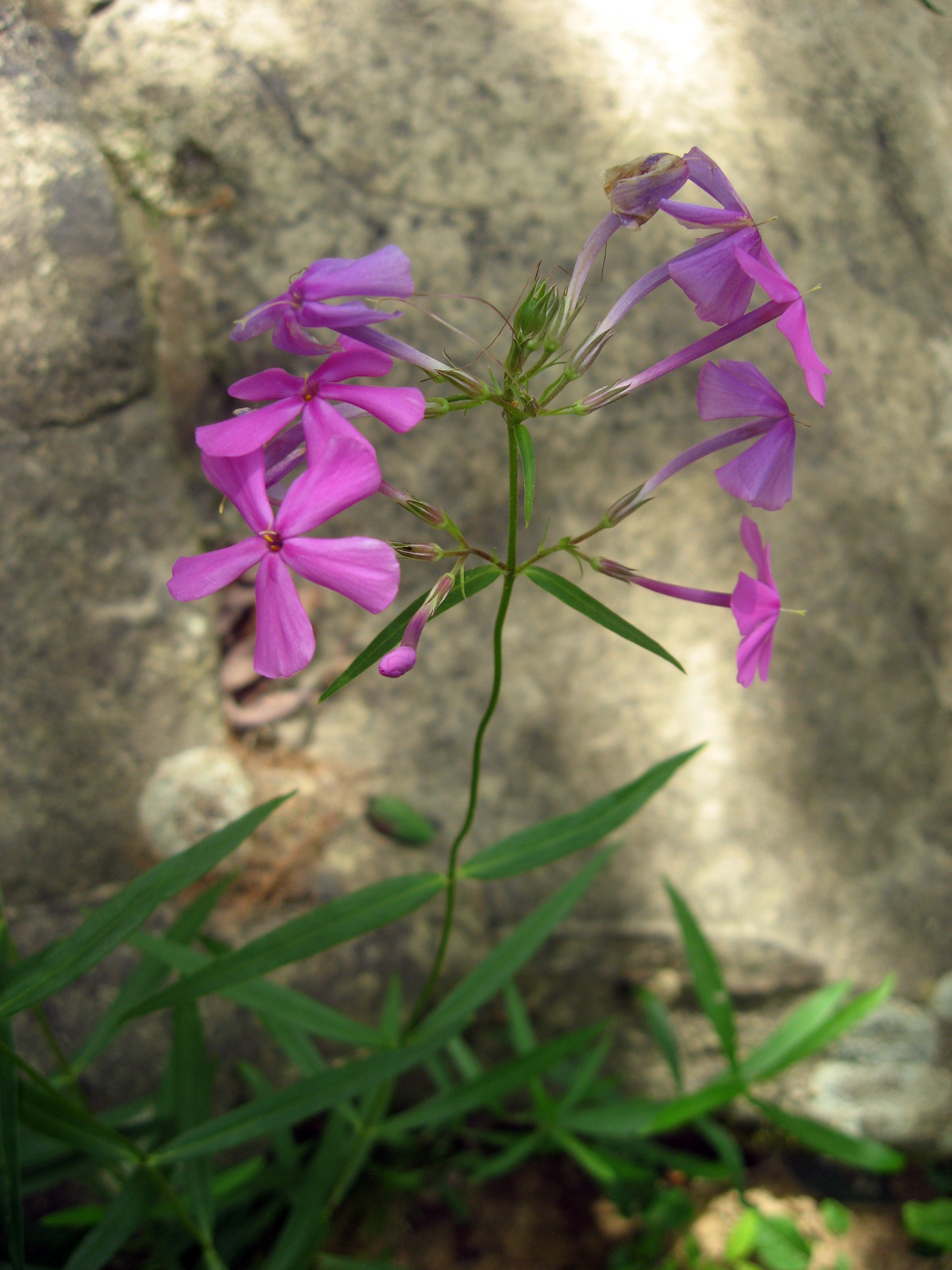
- Phlox glaberrima

Scientific classification
- Kingdom: Plantae
- Clade: Embryophytes
- Clade: Tracheophytes
- Clade: Angiosperms
- Clade: Eudicots
- Clade: Asterids
- Order: Ericales
- Family: Polemoniaceae
- Genus: Phlox; L. (1753)

Type species
- Phlox glaberrima in Alabama L.

Species
- 68; see text

Synonyms
- Armeria L. ex Kuntze (1891), nom. illeg.; Fonna Adans. (1763); Lychnidea Hill (1756), nom. superfl.; Phloxus St.-Lag. (1880), orth. var.

= Phlox =

Genus of flowering plants

Phlox (/ˈflɒks/; Ancient Greek: φλόξ "flame"; plural "phlox" or "phloxes", Ancient Greek: φλόγες phlóges) is a genus of 68 species of perennial and annual plants in the family Polemoniaceae. They are found mostly in North America (one in Siberia) in diverse habitats from alpine tundra to open woodland and prairie. Some flower in spring, others in summer and fall. Flowers may be pale blue, violet, pink, bright red, or white. Many are fragrant.

== Description ==
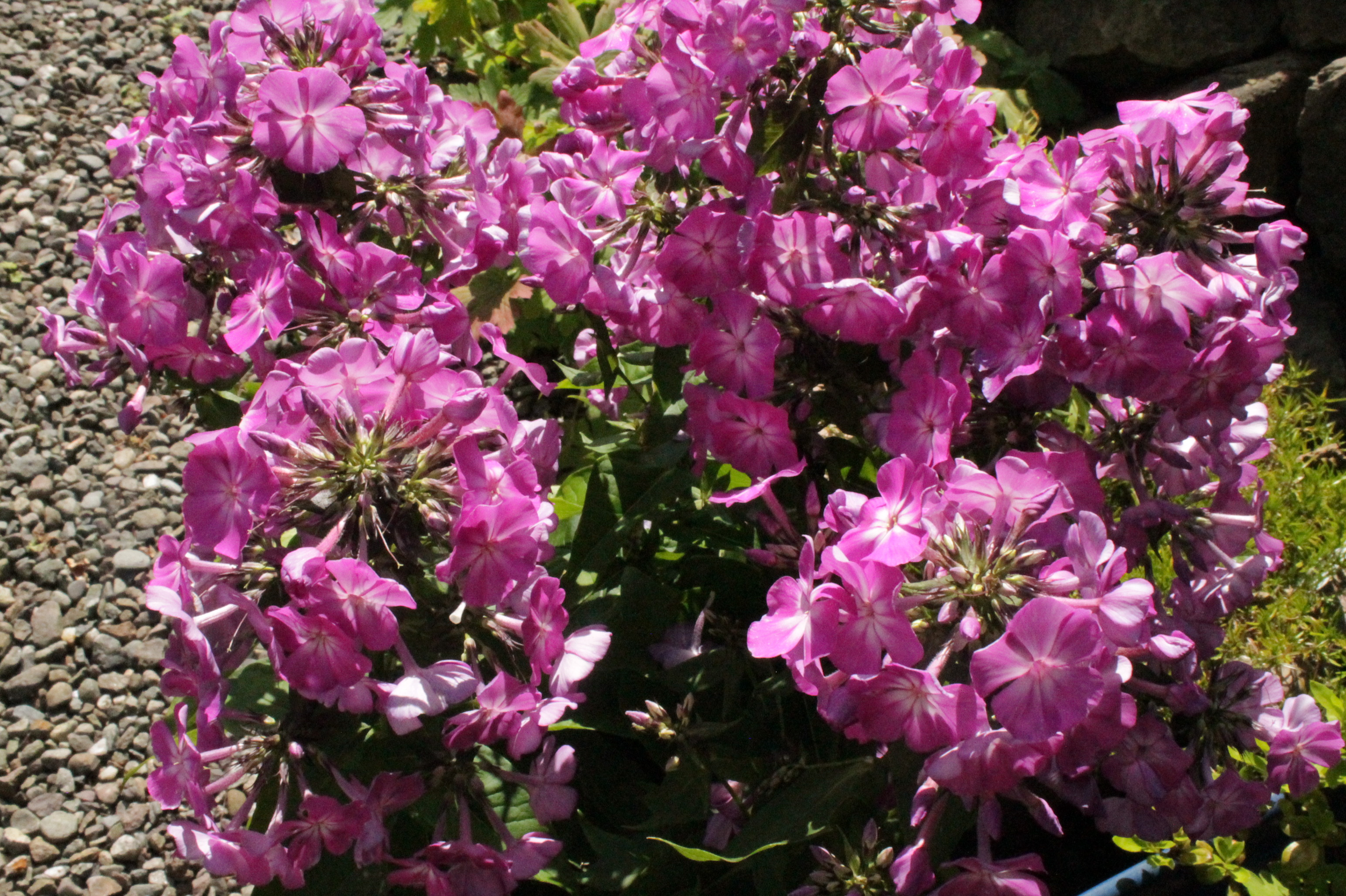
Phlox on a patio

The name is derived from the Ancient Greek word phlox meaning flame in reference to the intense flower colors of some varieties. Fertilized flowers typically produce one relatively large seed. The fruit is a longitudinally dehiscent capsule with three or more valves that sometimes separate explosively.

Some species such as P. paniculata (garden phlox) grow upright, while others such as P. subulata (moss phlox, moss pink, mountain phlox) grow short and matlike. Paniculata or tall phlox, is a native American wildflower that is native from New York to Iowa south to Georgia, Mississippi and Arkansas. It blooms from July to September.

Creeping phlox spreads rapidly and makes great ground cover. It can be planted to cover banks, fill spaces under tall trees, and spill and trail over slopes. Creeping phlox blooms in spring and produces long, spreading stems, which become woody with age. It was introduced into cultivation by the late 1700s.

The foliage of Phlox is a food for the larvae of some Lepidoptera species including dot moth, Gazoryctra wielgusi, hummingbird hawk-moth and Schinia indiana (which feeds exclusively on P. pilosa). Phlox species are also a popular food source for groundhogs, rabbits and deer.

== Species ==
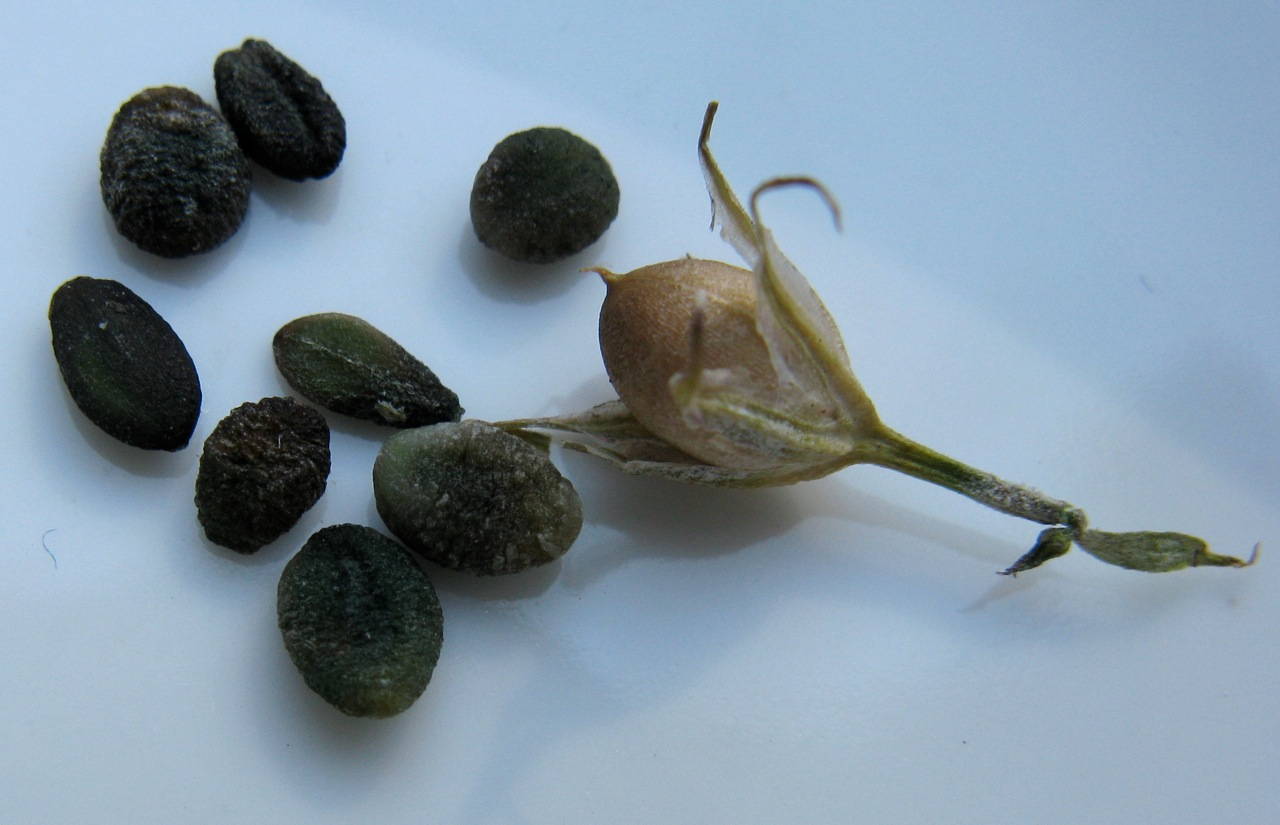
Fruit and seeds of P. paniculata

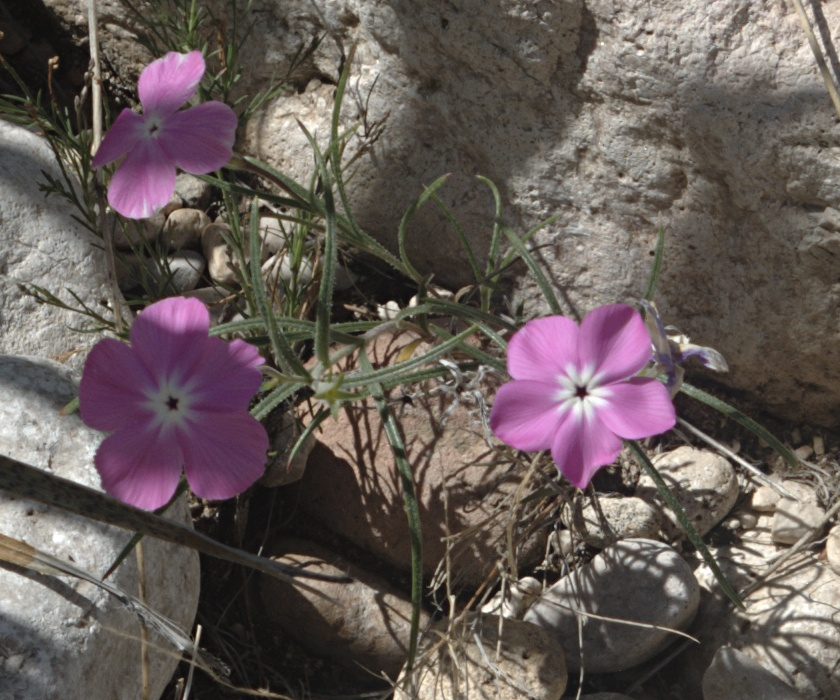
Phlox triovulata (three-seed phlox), New Mexico, US

The species in the genus include:

- Phlox aculeata A.Nelson
- Phlox adsurgens Torr. ex A.Gray
- Phlox albomarginata M.E.Jones
- Phlox alyssifolia Greene
- Phlox amabilis Brand
- Phlox amoena Sims
- Phlox amplifolia Britton
- Phlox andicola (Britton) E.E.Nelson
- Phlox austromontana Coville
- Phlox bifida L.C.Beck
- Phlox buckleyi Wherry
- Phlox caespitosa Nutt.
- Phlox carolina L.
- Phlox caryophylla Wherry
- Phlox cluteana A.Nelson
- Phlox colubrina Wherry & Constance
- Phlox condensata (A.Gray) E.E.Nelson
- Phlox cuspidata Scheele
- Phlox diffusa Benth.
- Phlox dispersa Sharsm.
- Phlox divaricata L.
- Phlox dolichantha A.Gray
- Phlox douglasii Hook.
- Phlox drummondii Hook.
- Phlox floridana Benth.
- Phlox glaberrima L.
- Phlox glabriflora (Brand) Whitehouse
- Phlox gladiformis (M.E.Jones) E.E.Nelson
- Phlox × glutinosa Buckley
- Phlox griseola Wherry
- Phlox hendersonii (E.E.Nelson) Cronquist
- Phlox hirsuta E.E.Nelson
- Phlox hoodii Richardson
- Phlox idahonis Wherry
- Phlox kelseyi Britton
- Phlox longifolia Nutt.
- Phlox maculata L.
- Phlox mesoleuca Greene
- Phlox mexicana Wherry
- Phlox missoulensis Wherry
- Phlox mollis Wherry
- Phlox multiflora A.Nelson
- Phlox nana Nutt.
- Phlox nivalis G.Lodd. ex Sweet
- Phlox oklahomensis Wherry
- Phlox opalensis Dorn
- Phlox ovata L.
- Phlox paniculata L.
- Phlox pattersonii Prather
- Phlox peckii Wherry
- Phlox pilosa L.
- Phlox pulchra (Wherry) Wherry
- Phlox pulvinata (Wherry) Cronquist
- Phlox pungens Dorn
- Phlox × pyramidalis Sm.
- Phlox richardsonii Hook.
- Phlox rigida Benth.
- Phlox roemeriana Scheele
- Phlox sibirica L.
- Phlox solivaga Mayfield & Darrach
- Phlox speciosa Pursh
- Phlox stolonifera Sims
- Phlox subulata L.
- Phlox tenuifolia E.E.Nelson
- Phlox triovulata Thurb. ex Torr.
- Phlox variabilis Brand
- Phlox vermejoensis B.S.Legler
- Phlox viridis E.E.Nelson
- Phlox viscida E.E.Nelson
- Phlox woodhousei (A.Gray) E.E.Nelson

== Cultivation ==
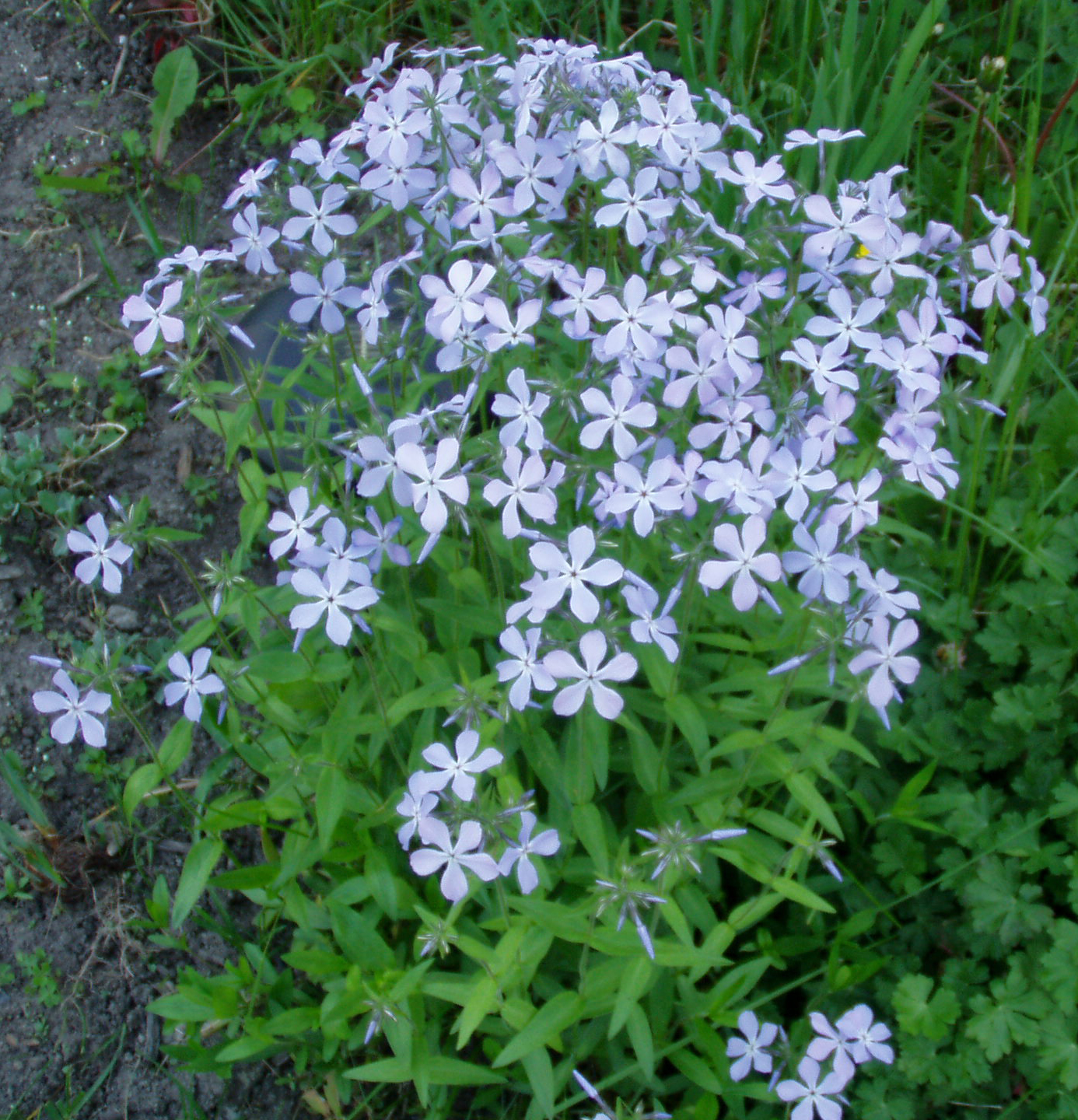
Clump of woodland phlox (P. divaricata)

Phlox species are widely grown for their abundant, colorful blooms and adaptability to a range of garden conditions. Their growth requirements vary by species, with low-growing forms such as Phlox subulata thriving in full sun and well-drained soil, while woodland species like Phlox divaricata prefer partial shade and moist, humus-rich conditions. Taller species such as Phlox paniculata perform best in fertile, evenly moist soil and full to partial sunlight.

Most cultivated phlox, with the notable exception of Phlox drummondii, are perennial. Species from alpine habitats (and cultivars derived from them) require full sun and good drainage. Those from woodland habitats (such as Phlox divaricata) require partial shade and soil rich in humus. Those from waterside habitats (such as P. paniculata) require full sun and moisture at the roots. Phlox are valued in the garden for their ability to attract butterflies. Phlox are propagated from stem cuttings, clump division, and seeds.

Cultivated plants are spaced to allow good air circulation, which helps reduce susceptibility to powdery mildew—a common problem among taller varieties. Regular watering during dry periods and the application of compost or mulch in spring help maintain soil moisture and suppress weeds. Removing spent flower clusters can encourage extended flowering.

Garden phlox benefits from periodic division every few years to maintain vigor and prevent overcrowding. After the flowering season, stems can be cut back to near ground level. Common pests and diseases include powdery mildew, rust, leaf spots, and stem nematodes, though resistant cultivars are widely available.
