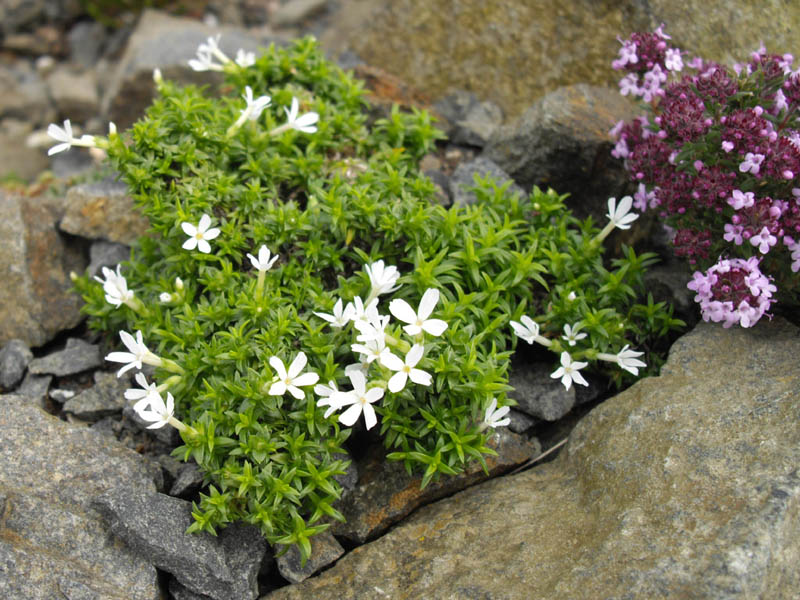

Conservation status
- Secure (NatureServe)

Scientific classification
- Kingdom: Plantae
- Clade: Embryophytes
- Clade: Tracheophytes
- Clade: Spermatophytes
- Clade: Angiosperms
- Clade: Eudicots
- Clade: Asterids
- Order: Ericales
- Family: Polemoniaceae
- Genus: Phlox
- Species: P. austromontana

Binomial name
- Phlox austromontana Coville

Subspecies
- P. a. subsp. austromontana; P. a. subsp. densa; P. a. subsp. jonesii; P. a. subsp. prostrata

Synonyms
- Phlox acerba; Phlox aciculifolia; Phlox cyanea; Phlox densa; Phlox jonesii; Phlox lutescens; Phlox pinifolia

= Phlox austromontana =

Plant species in the phlox family

Phlox austromontana is a species of phlox known by the common name mountain phlox. It is native to the southwestern United States and Baja California, where it grows in forested and wooded mountain habitat, scrub, and open areas. It is a mat-forming perennial herb growing in patches of very short stems. The lance-shaped leaves are no more than 1.5 centimeters long and are arranged oppositely in pairs on the short stems. The inflorescence is a solitary flower at the tip of each stem. The flower is white or light pink or lavender with five rounded lobes. It is just over a centimeter long.

== Taxonomy ==
The botanist Frederick Vernon Coville scientifically described and named Phlox austromontana in 1893. It is part of the Phlox genus which is classified in the Polemoniaceae family. The species has four accepted subspecies.

- Phlox austromontana subsp. austromontana – Widespread from Washington and Wyoming to Baja California
- Phlox austromontana subsp. densa – Native to Oregon to Arizona
- Phlox austromontana subsp. jonesii – Native to Utah
- Phlox austromontana subsp. prostrata – Native to the southwestern US

Phlox austromontana has 15 synonyms of the species or one of its four subspecies.

Table of Synonyms
Name	Year	Rank	Synonym of:	Notes
Phlox acerba A.Nelson	1938	species	subsp. prostrata	= het.
Phlox aciculifolia P.B.Kenn.	1911	species	subsp. austromontana	= het.
Phlox austromontana var. jonesii (Wherry) S.L.Welsh	1985	variety	subsp. jonesii	≡ hom.
Phlox austromontana subsp. lutescens (S.L.Welsh) Locklear	2009	subspecies	subsp. austromontana	= het.
Phlox austromontana var. lutescens S.L.Welsh	1985	variety	subsp. austromontana	= het.
Phlox austromontana var. prostrata E.E.Nelson	1899	variety	subsp. prostrata	≡ hom.
Phlox austromontana subsp. vera Wherry	1939	subspecies	subsp. austromontana	= het.
Phlox cyanea Eastw.	1939	species	subsp. austromontana	= het.
Phlox densa Brand	1907	species	subsp. densa	≡ hom.
Phlox diffusa subsp. subcarinata Wherry	1939	subspecies	subsp. austromontana	= het.
Phlox diffusa var. subcarinata (Wherry) M.Peck	1941	variety	subsp. austromontana	= het.
Phlox douglasii var. austromontana (Coville) Jeps. & H.Mason	1925	variety	P. austromontana	≡ hom.
Phlox jonesii Wherry	1944	species	subsp. jonesii	≡ hom.
Phlox lutescens (S.L.Welsh) S.L.Welsh	2003	species	subsp. austromontana	= het.
Phlox pinifolia Brand	1907	species	subsp. austromontana	= het.
Notes: ≡ homotypic synonym; = heterotypic synonym
