= List of Solanales of Montana =

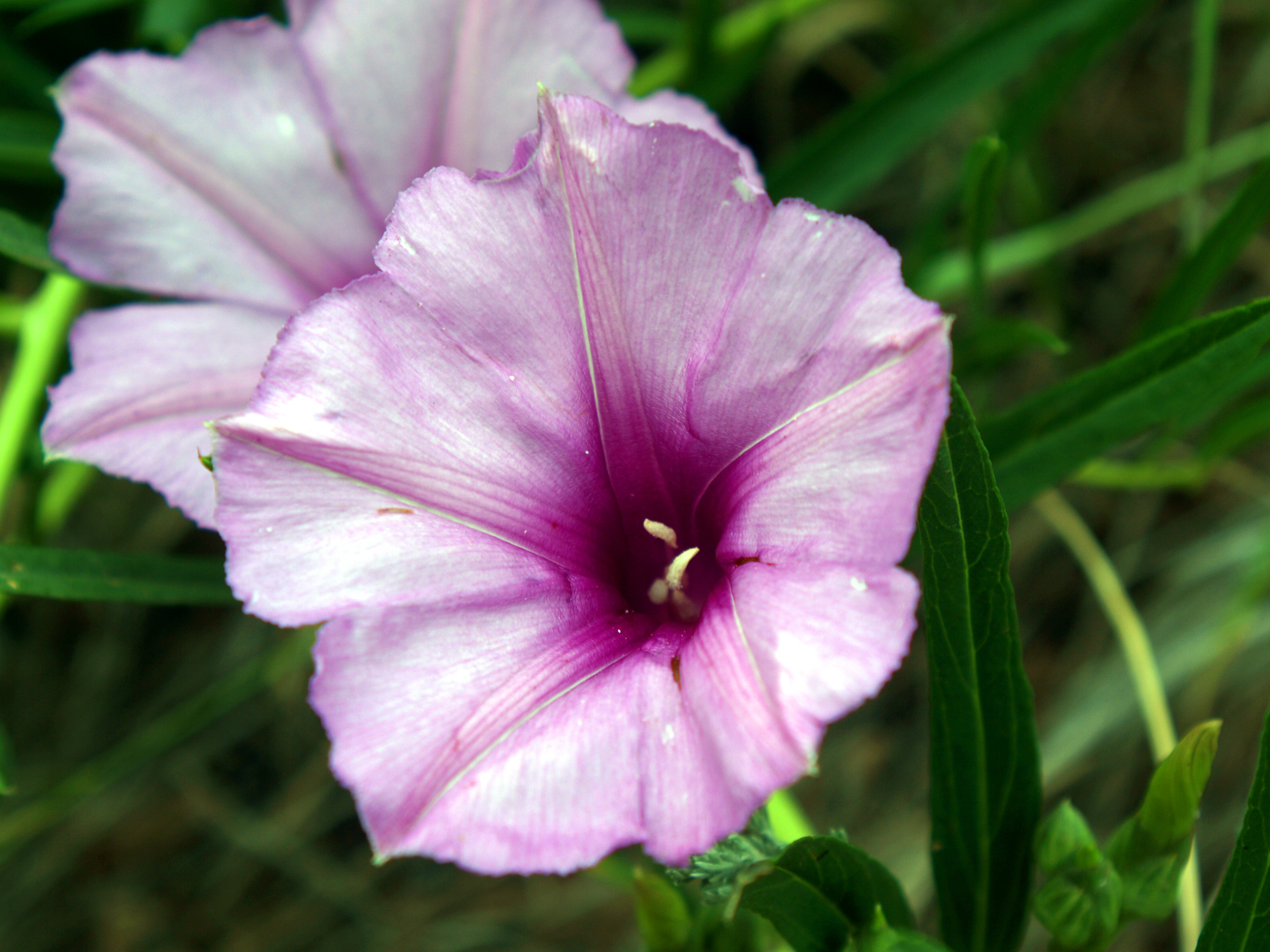
Bush morning-glory, Ipomoea leptophylla

There are at least 94 members of the order Solanales found in Montana. Some of these species are exotics (not native to Montana) and some species have been designated as Species of Concern.

== Buckbean ==
Family: Menyanthaceae

- Menyanthes trifoliata, bog buckbean

== Dodder ==
Family: Cuscutaceae

- Cuscuta approximata, small-seed alfalfa dodder
- Cuscuta coryli, hazel dodder
- Cuscuta epithymum, clover dodder
- Cuscuta gronovii, Gronovius dodder
- Cuscuta indecora, pretty dodder
- Cuscuta megalocarpa, big-fruit dodder
- Cuscuta pentagona, field dodder

== Morning-glory ==
Family: Convolvulaceae

- Calystegia macounii, Macoun's bindweed
- Calystegia sepium, hedge false bindweed
- Convolvulus arvensis, field bindweed
- Evolvulus nuttallianus, shaggy dwarf morning-glory
- Ipomoea leptophylla, bush morning-glory

== Phlox ==
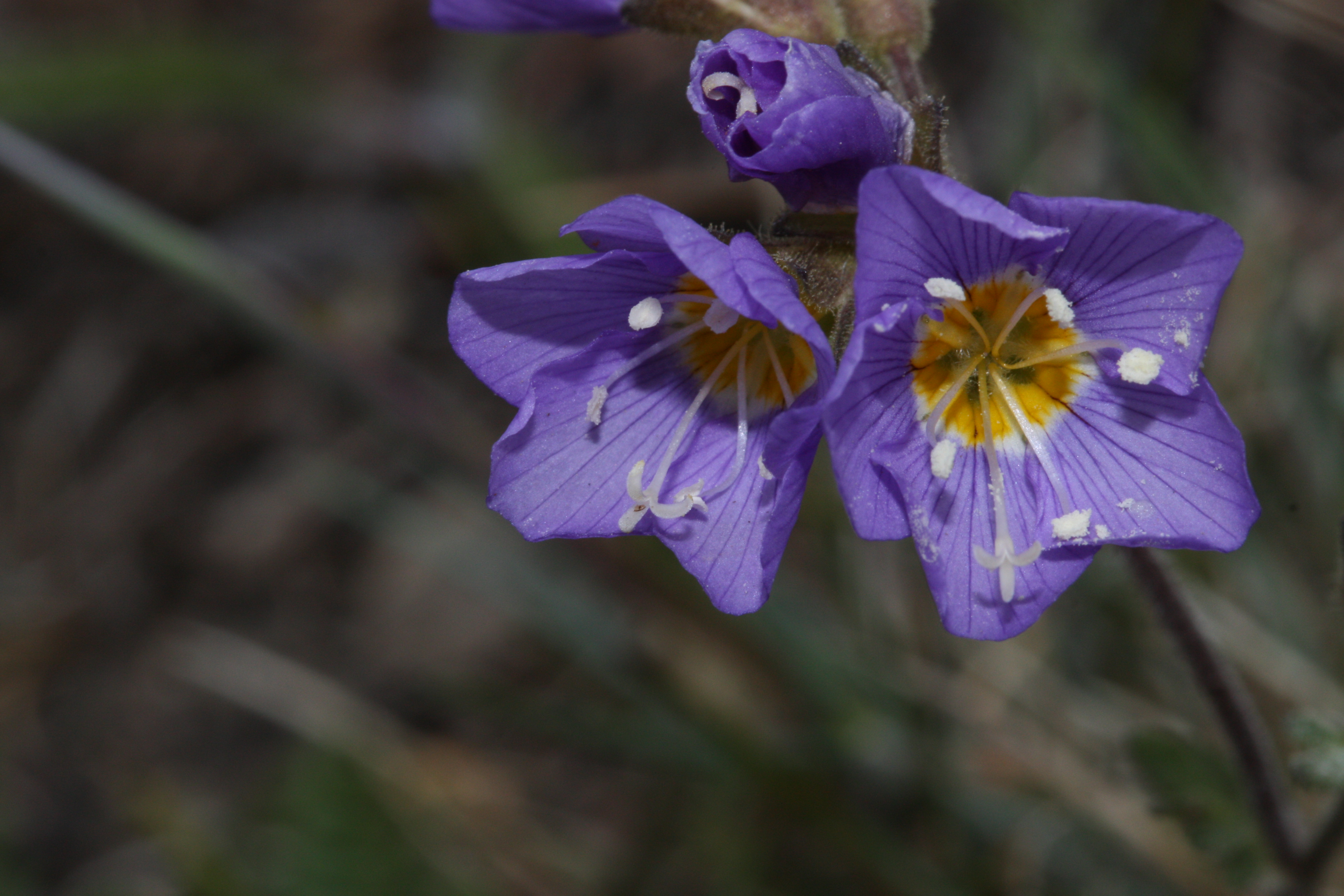
Showy Jacob's ladder, Polemonium pulcherrimum

Family: Polemoniaceae

- Collomia debilis, alpine collomia
- Collomia debilis var. camporum, alpine collomia
- Collomia debilis var. debilis, alpine collomia
- Collomia grandiflora, large-flower collomia
- Collomia linearis, narrow-leaved collomia
- Collomia tinctoria, yellow-staining collomia
- Gilia leptomeria, great basin gilia
- Gilia sinuata var. tweedyi, western polemonium
- Gilia tenerrima, delicate gilia
- Gilia tweedyi, Tweedy's gilia
- Gymnosteris parvula, small-flower gymnosteris
- Ipomopsis aggregata, scarlet skyrocket
- Ipomopsis congesta, ball-head standing-cypress
- Ipomopsis congesta subsp. congesta, ball-head standing-cypress
- Ipomopsis congesta subsp. crebrifolia, ballhead gilia
- Ipomopsis congesta subsp. pseudotypica, Wyoming ipomopsis
- Ipomopsis minutiflora, small-flower standing-cypress
- Ipomopsis pumila, dwarf ipomopsis
- Ipomopsis spicata, spiked standing-cypress
- Ipomopsis spicata subsp. orchidacea, orchid ipomopsis
- Ipomopsis spicata subsp. spicata, spiked ipomopsis
- Leptodactylon caespitosum, leptodactylon
- Leptodactylon pungens, granite prickly-phlox
- Linanthus nuttallii, Nuttall's linanthus
- Linanthus septentrionalis, northern desert-gold
- Microsteris gracilis, slender phlox
- Navarretia divaricata, mountain navarretia
- Navarretia intertexta, needle-leaf navarretia
- Navarretia intertexta subsp. propinqua, near navarretia
- Navarretia leucocephala, white-flower navarretia
- Phlox albomarginata, mountain phlox
- Phlox alyssifolia, alyssum-leaf phlox
- Phlox andicola, Plains phlox
- Phlox austromontana, desert mountain phlox
- Phlox caespitosa, carpet phlox
- Phlox diffusa, spreading phlox
- Phlox hoodii, Hood's phlox
- Phlox kelseyi, Kelsey's phlox
- Phlox kelseyi subsp. kelseyi, Kelsey's phlox
- Phlox kelseyi var. missoulensis, Missoula phlox
- Phlox longifolia, longleaf phlox
- Phlox multiflora, many-flowered phlox
- Phlox muscoides, moss phlox
- Phlox pulvinata, cushion phlox
- Phlox speciosa, showy phlox
- Polemonium micranthum, annual polemonium
- Polemonium pulcherrimum, showy Jacob's-ladder
- Polemonium viscosum, skunk polemonium

== Potato ==
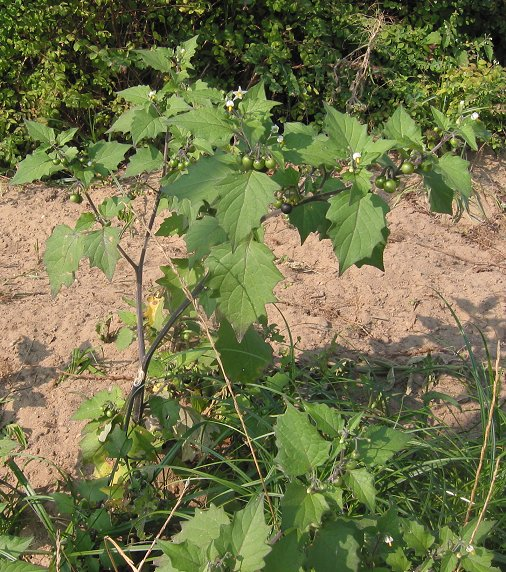
Black nightshade, Solanum nigrum

Family: Solanaceae

- Datura stramonium, jimsonweed
- Hyoscyamus niger, black henbane
- Lycium barbarum, common matrimony vine
- Nicotiana attenuata, coyote tobacco
- Physalis hederifolia, ivyleaf ground-cherry
- Physalis heterophylla, clammy ground-cherry
- Physalis longifolia, longleaf ground-cherry
- Physalis pumila subsp. hispida, prairie ground-cherry
- Solanum dulcamara, climbing nightshade
- Solanum nigrum, black nightshade
- Solanum physalifolium, ground-cherry nightshade
- Solanum rostratum, buffalo bur
- Solanum triflorum, cut-leaf nightshade

== Waterleaf ==
Family: Hydrophyllaceae

- Ellisia nyctelea, nyctelea
- Hesperochiron californicus, California hesperochiron
- Hesperochiron pumilus, dwarf hesperochiron
- Hydrophyllum capitatum, dwarf waterleaf
- Nama densa, nama
- Nemophila breviflora, Great Basin nemophila
- Phacelia bakeri, Baker's phacelia
- Phacelia franklinii, Franklin's phacelia
- Phacelia glandulosa, glandular scorpionweed
- Phacelia hastata, silverleaf scorpion-weed
- Phacelia heterophylla, virgate scorpion-weed
- Phacelia incana, hoary phacelia
- Phacelia ivesiana, Ives' phacelia
- Phacelia ivesiana var. glandulifera, sticky scorpion-weed
- Phacelia linearis, linearleaf phacelia
- Phacelia lyallii, Lyall phacelia
- Phacelia scopulina, dwarf phacelia
- Phacelia sericea, silky scorpion-weed
- Phacelia thermalis, hot spring phacelia
- Romanzoffia sitchensis, Sitka mistmaid

== See also ==
- List of dicotyledons of Montana
