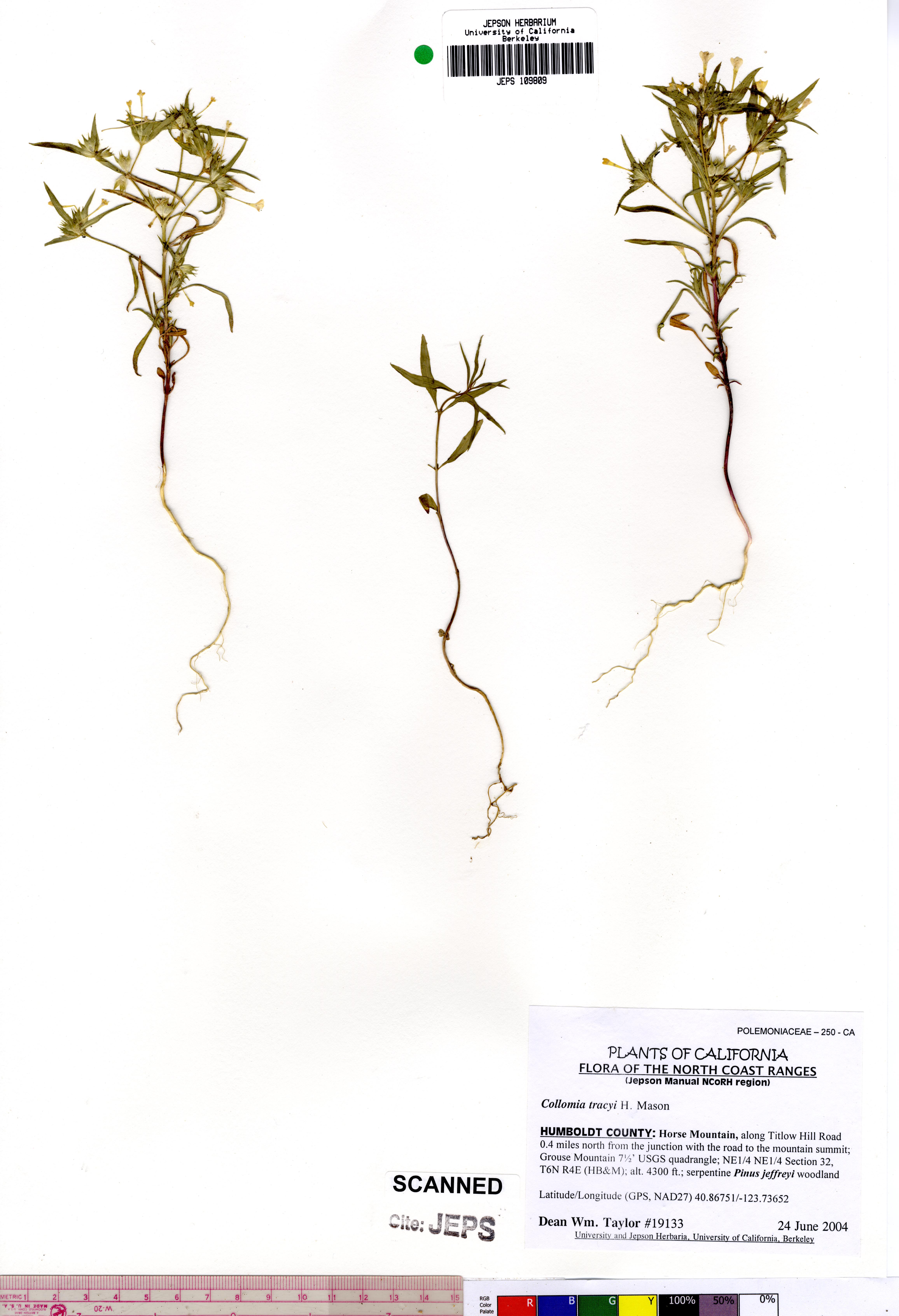

Scientific classification
- Kingdom: Plantae
- Clade: Tracheophytes
- Clade: Angiosperms
- Clade: Eudicots
- Clade: Asterids
- Order: Ericales
- Family: Polemoniaceae
- Genus: Collomia
- Species: C. tracyi

Binomial name
- Collomia tracyi H.Mason

= Collomia tracyi =

Species of flowering plant

Collomia tracyi is a species of flowering plant in the phlox family known by the common name Tracy's collomia. It is endemic to northern California, where it grows in the coniferous forests of the mountain ranges, including the Klamath Mountains. It is an annual herb producing a slender, branched stem no taller than about 8 centimeters. The glandular, hairy leaves are lance-shaped. The inflorescence is composed of two or three flowers emerging from the leaf axils. Each flower is white to lavender and up to 2 centimeters long. This species can be distinguished from the more common and widespread Collomia tinctoria by the positioning of the stamens and stigma in the flower.
