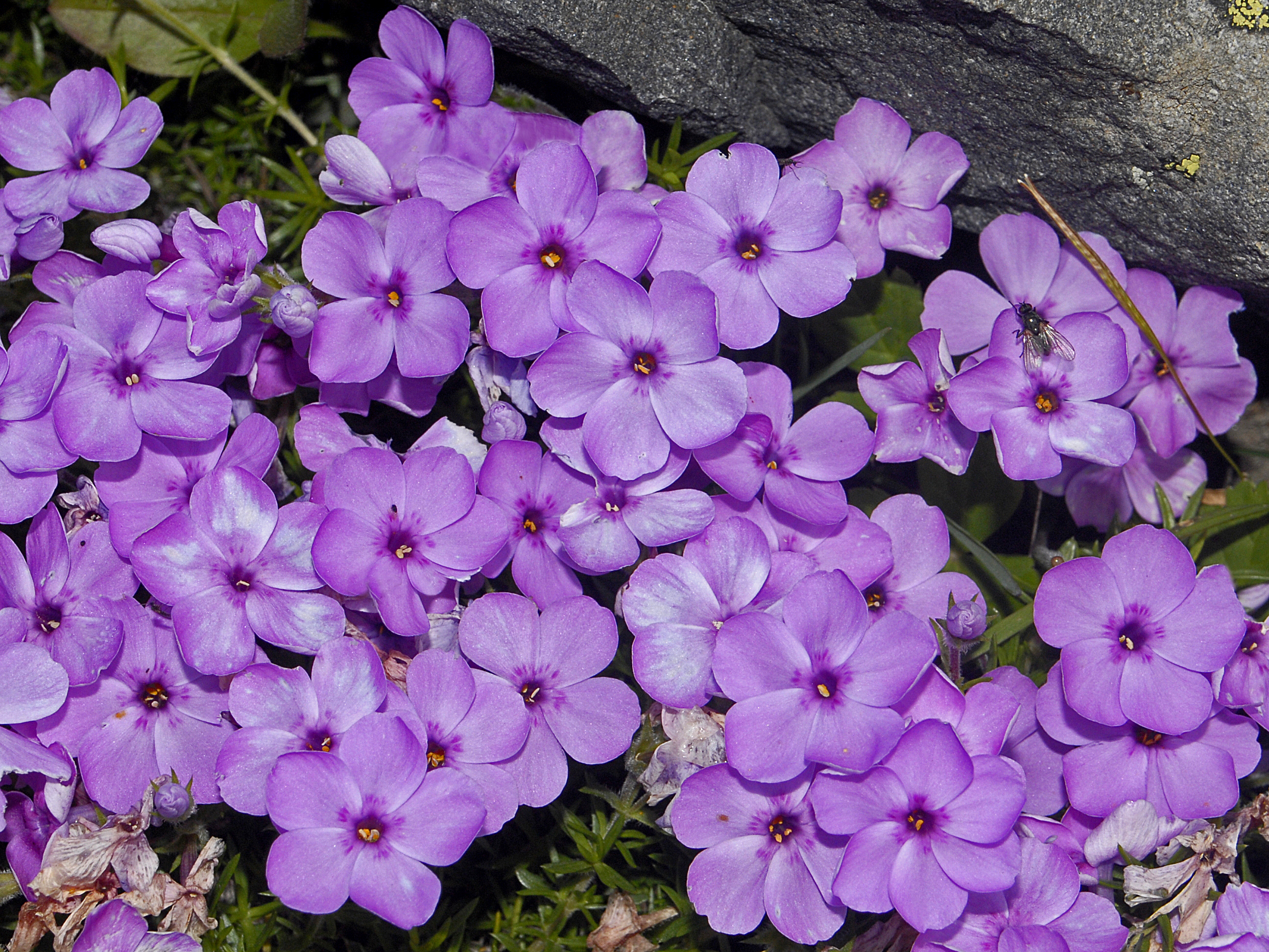
- Flowers of Phlox douglasii at the Giardino Botanico Alpino Chanousia

Scientific classification
- Kingdom: Plantae
- Clade: Tracheophytes
- Clade: Angiosperms
- Clade: Eudicots
- Clade: Asterids
- Order: Ericales
- Family: Polemoniaceae
- Genus: Phlox
- Species: P. douglasii

Binomial name
- Phlox douglasii Hook.

Synonyms
- Phlox rigida Benth.; Phlox douglasii subsp. rigida (Benth.) Wherry

= Phlox douglasii =

Species of flowering plant

Phlox douglasii, common name tufted phlox or Columbia phlox, is a species of perennial herb belonging to the family Polemoniaceae. In the past it has been mistakenly included within the species Phlox caespitosa.

== Description ==
Phlox douglasii can reach a height of about 10 cm, forming low mounds or cushions of simple needle-like dark green leaves, 4–8 millimetres (0.16–0.31 in) long, with sharp tips and forming short tufts. Growth is from short basal woody stems but during the growth season these are largely hidden by leaves. Both the leaves and the floral calyx bear short gland-tipped hairs. Flowers may be purple, pink, pale lavender or magenta-red, about 1.5 cm across, usually in terminal clusters of 1 to 3 flowers born on very short pedicels. They bloom from April to August.

== Distribution ==
Phlox douglasii is native to northwestern United States, mostly on the Columbia Plateau in Oregon and Washington State, and probably extending in similar habitat in northern California and parts of Idaho.

== Habitat ==
This species grows in dry areas, sagebrush scrubs and woodlands, at elevation of 300–2,000 metres (980–6,560 ft) above sea level. It can be found in Columbia plateau scabland in rocky soil over shallow basalt bedrock.

== Cultivars ==
The following hybrid cultivars have received the Royal Horticultural Society's Award of Garden Merit:

- 'Boothman's Variety' (pink, darker eye)
- 'Crackerjack' (magenta)
- 'Iceberg' (white)
- 'Kelly's Eye' (pale pink)
- 'Red Admiral' (deep pink)

== Gallery ==
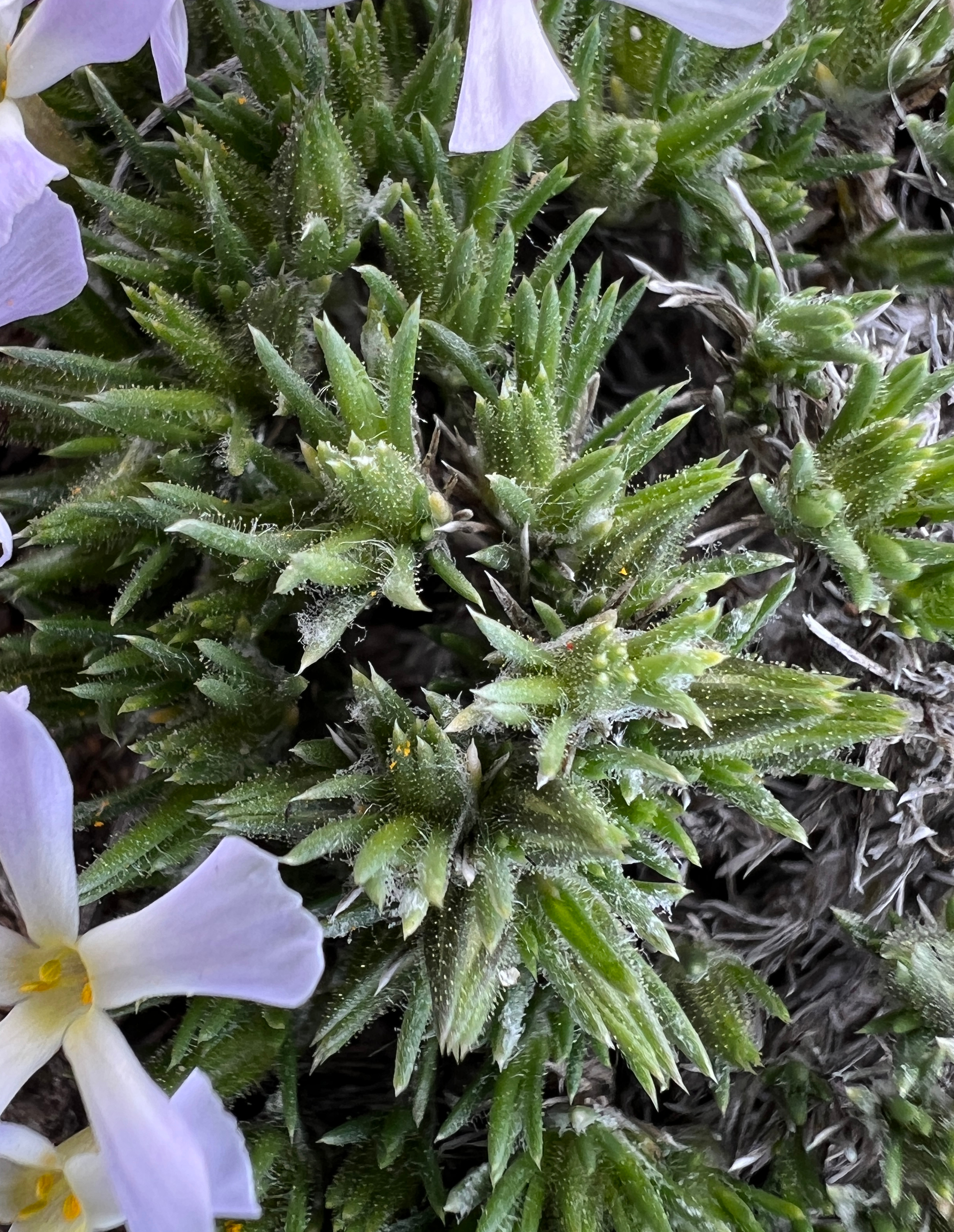
Leaves with sharp tips and glandular hairs

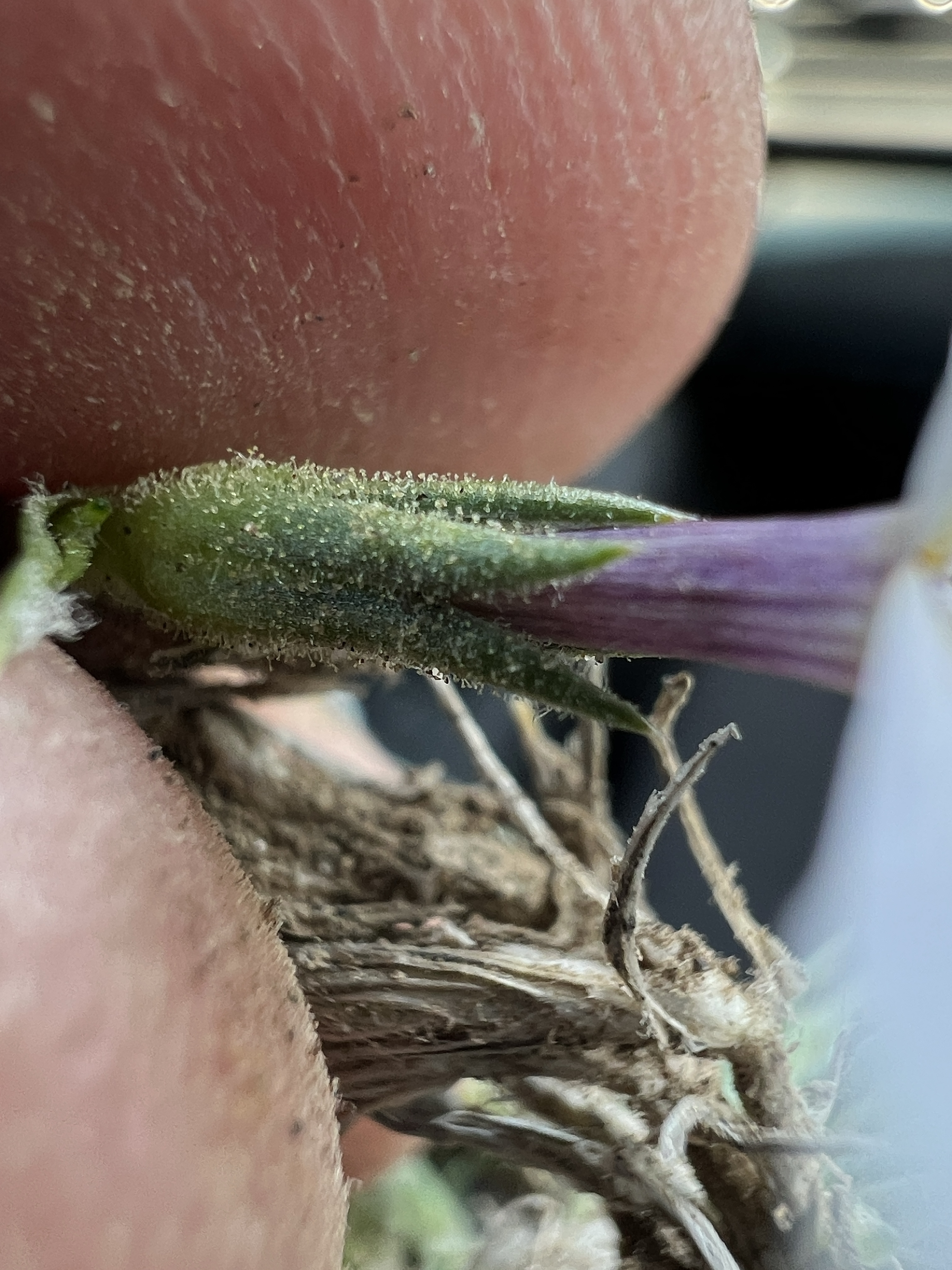
Calyx with short glandular hairs
