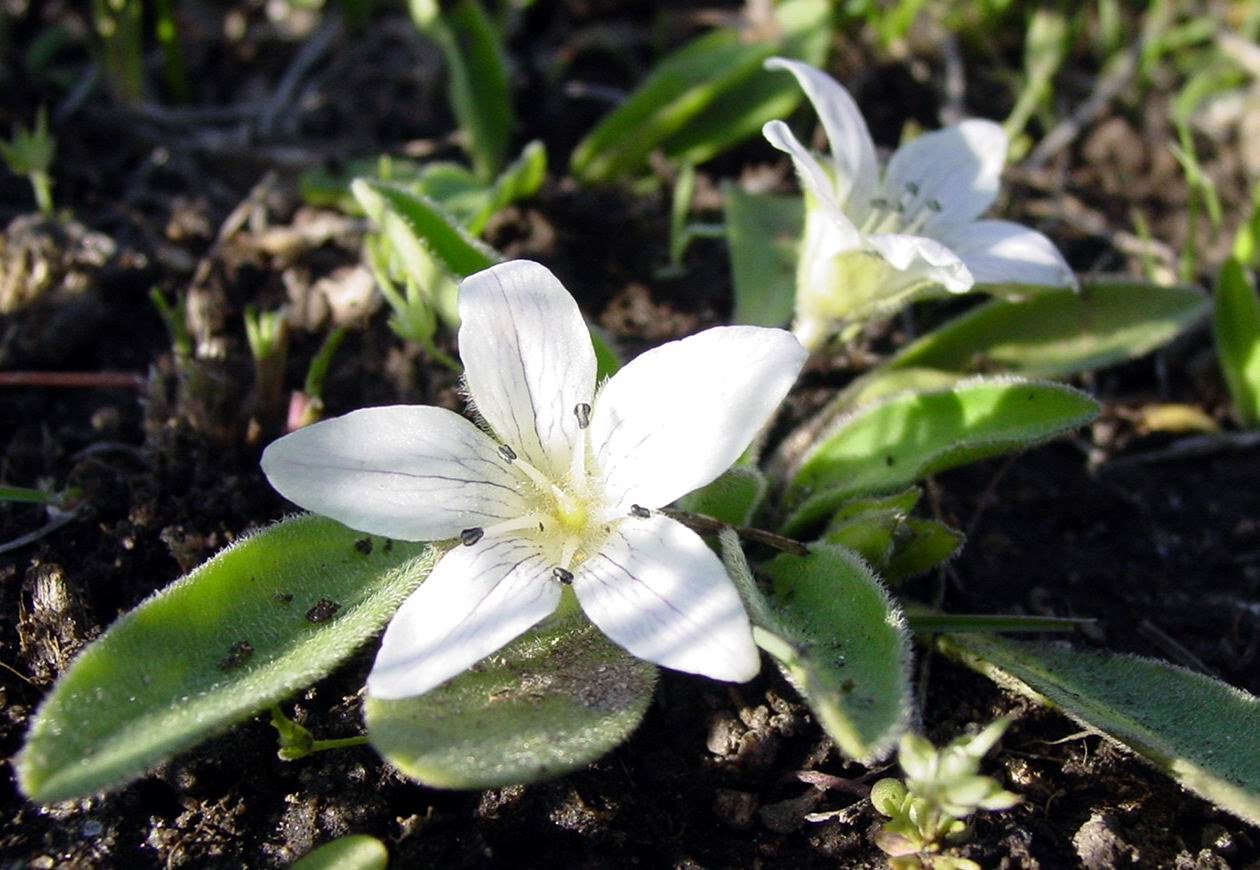
- Hesperochiron nanus, syn. Hesperochiron californicus

Scientific classification
- Kingdom: Plantae
- Clade: Tracheophytes
- Clade: Angiosperms
- Clade: Eudicots
- Clade: Asterids
- Order: Boraginales
- Family: Hydrophyllaceae
- Genus: Hesperochiron; S.Wats.

Species
- See text.

= Hesperochiron =

Genus of flowering plants

Hesperochiron is a small genus of plants in the waterleaf family containing two species native to western North America. These are thick-rooted perennial herbs growing in squat patches at ground level and producing bluish-white flowers with yellow throats. They grow in wet areas such as seepy meadows.

The species are generally similar in appearance, with oblong green leaves up to 7 or 8 centimeters long and 2 to 3 wide, often coated with tiny hairs. Hesperochiron nanus, the California hesperochiron, produces slightly larger flowers than the dwarf hesperochiron, Hesperochiron pumilus.

The H. pumilus flower resembles wild strawberry, but has only five stamens and distinct elliptical leaves. They bloom briefly in early spring in the sagebrush steppe.

== Species ==
As of December 2025, the number of accepted species varied. Plants of the World Online (PoWO) accepted only two:

- Hesperochiron nanus (Lindl.) Greene
- Hesperochiron pumilus (Griseb.) Porter

World Flora Online accepted two species treated as synonyms by PoWO:

- Hesperochiron californicus (Benth.) S.Watson (syn. of H. nanus)
- Hesperochiron campanulatus (Greene) Brand (syn. of H. pumilus)
