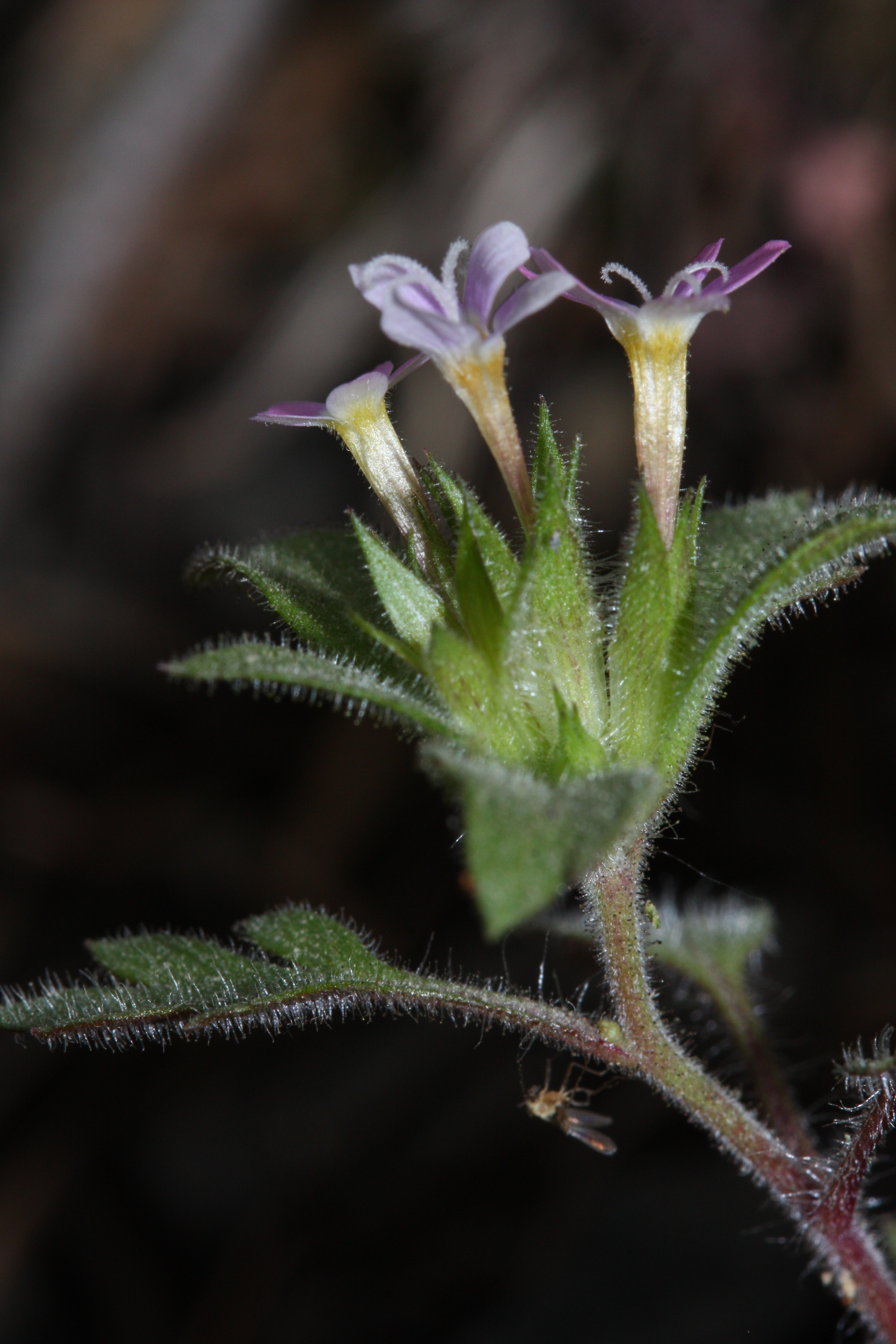

Scientific classification
- Kingdom: Plantae
- Clade: Tracheophytes
- Clade: Angiosperms
- Clade: Eudicots
- Clade: Asterids
- Order: Ericales
- Family: Polemoniaceae
- Genus: Collomia
- Species: C. heterophylla

Binomial name
- Collomia heterophylla Dougl. ex Hook.

= Collomia heterophylla =

Species of flowering plant

Collomia heterophylla is a species of flowering plant in the phlox family known by the common name variableleaf collomia. It is native to western North America from British Columbia to Idaho to central California, where it grows in several types of habitat, including open areas on gravelly mountain slopes. It is a hairy annual herb producing a branching, erect stem. As the common name suggests, the leaves are variable in shape, the lower generally with several toothed lobes and the upper sometimes lacking lobes. The inflorescence is a cluster of flowers emerging from the top of the stem or from the axil of a leaf. It may bear up to 25 flowers, each with star-shaped corolla at the tip of an elongated tube. The corolla lobes are lance-shaped and white to deep pink with white bases.
