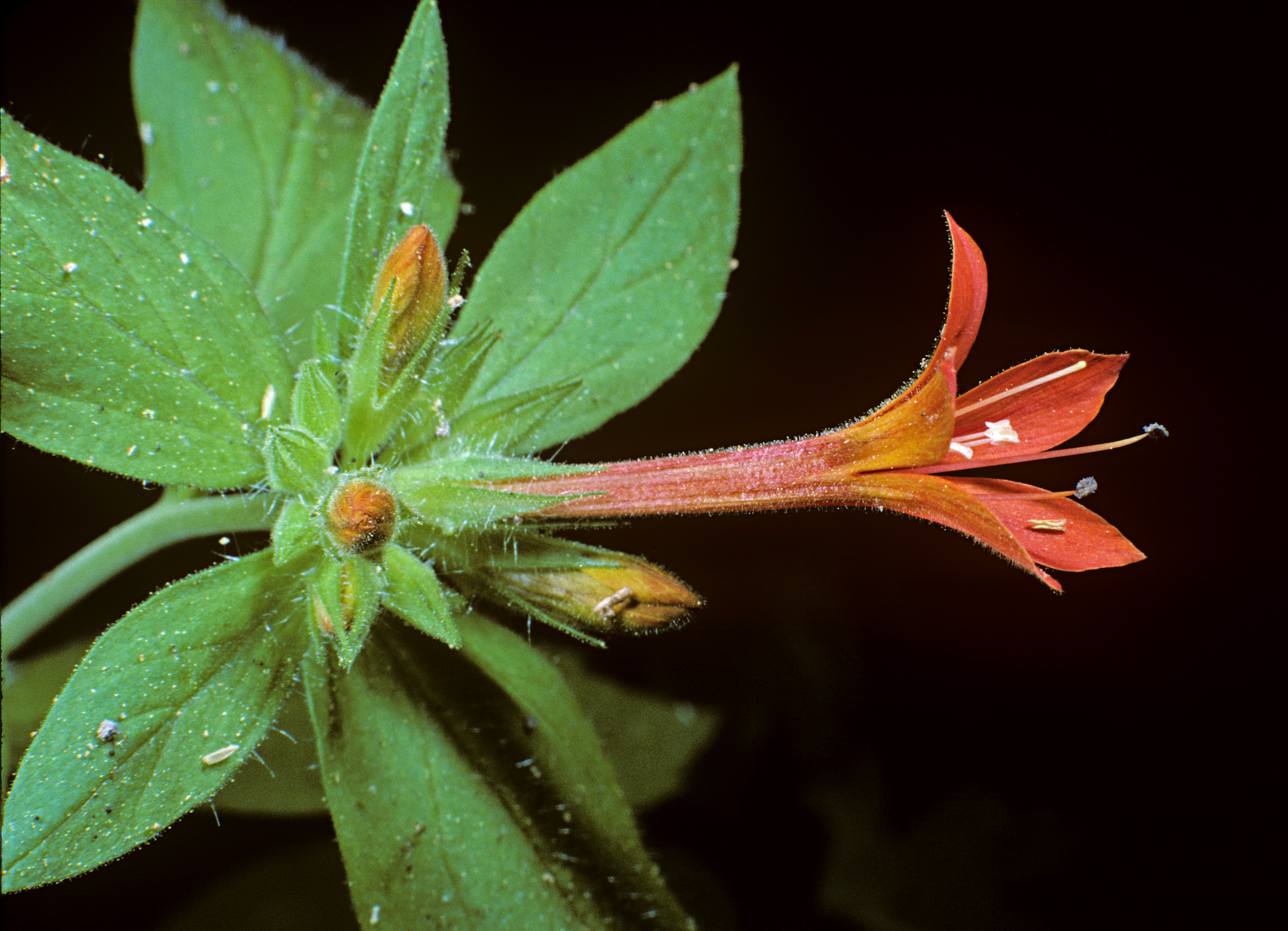

Conservation status
- Imperiled (NatureServe)

Scientific classification
- Kingdom: Plantae
- Clade: Tracheophytes
- Clade: Angiosperms
- Clade: Eudicots
- Clade: Asterids
- Order: Ericales
- Family: Polemoniaceae
- Genus: Collomia
- Species: C. rawsoniana

Binomial name
- Collomia rawsoniana Greene

= Collomia rawsoniana =

Species of flowering plant

Collomia rawsoniana is a species of flowering plant in the phlox family known by the common name flaming trumpet. This perennial wildflower is endemic to California, where it is known from only two counties: Mariposa and Madera. It grows in the woodland understory in the Sierra Nevada foothills. This plant produces a thin, erect stem to about half a meter in height with widely spaced, deeply toothed hairy leaves each several centimeters long. Atop the stem is an inflorescence of three to seven showy red-orange flowers. Each flower is up to 4 centimeters long and trumpet-shaped, with a protruding pistil and stamens tipped with anthers covered in blue pollen.

The species name commemorates the collector of its type material, Lucy Adeline Briggs Cole Rawson Peckinpah Smallman.
