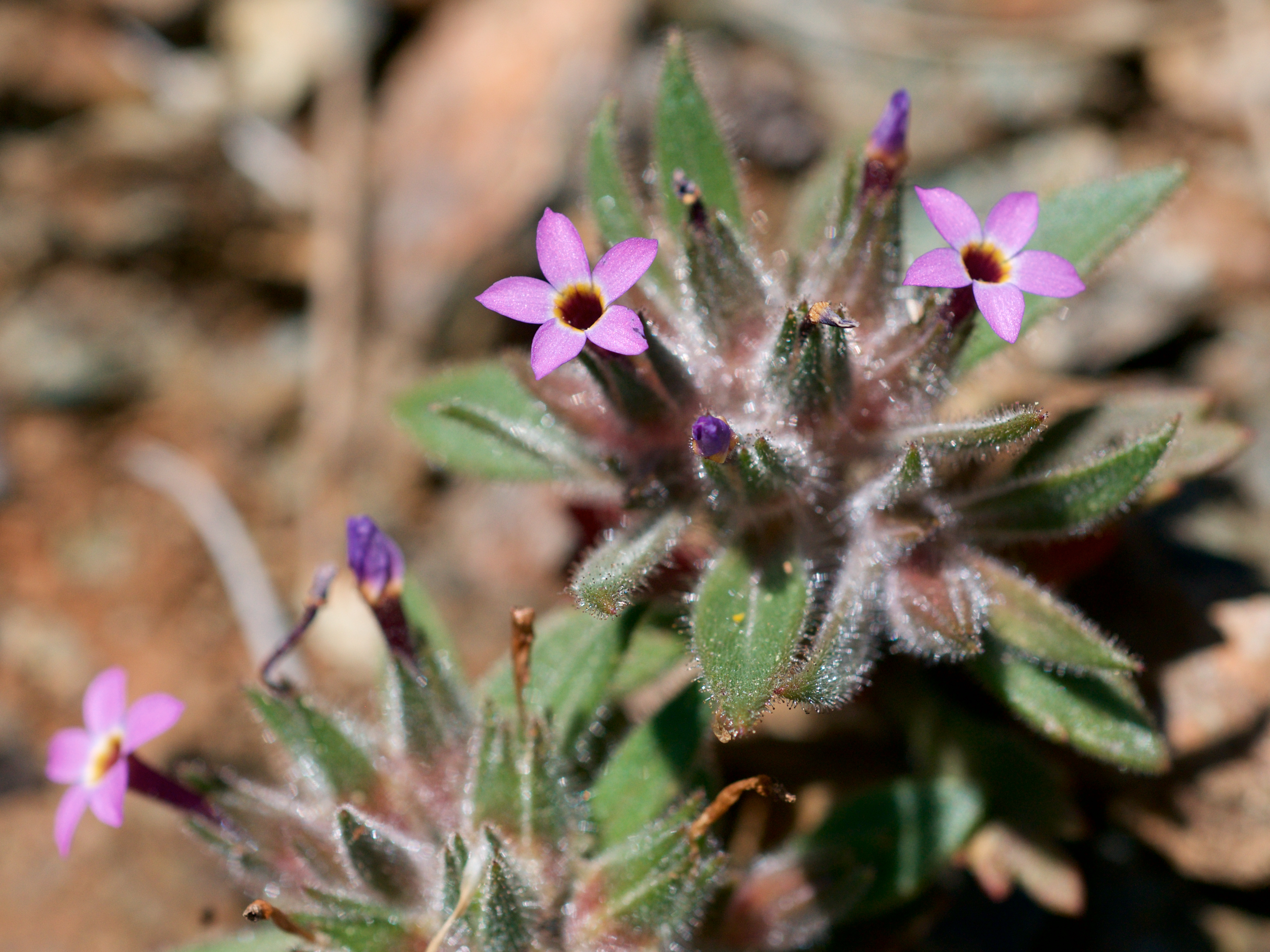

Conservation status
- Apparently Secure (NatureServe)

Scientific classification
- Kingdom: Plantae
- Clade: Tracheophytes
- Clade: Angiosperms
- Clade: Eudicots
- Clade: Asterids
- Order: Ericales
- Family: Polemoniaceae
- Genus: Collomia
- Species: C. diversifolia

Binomial name
- Collomia diversifolia Greene

= Collomia diversifolia =

Species of flowering plant

Collomia diversifolia is a species of flowering plant in the phlox family known by the common name serpentine collomia. It is endemic to California, where it is a member of the serpentine soils flora in the North Coast Ranges from the northern San Francisco Bay Area to Shasta County. It is a small annual herb with many branches bearing dark lance-shaped leaves, the most basal ones having three small teeth. Leaves and stems are lightly to densely covered with glandular hairs. The inflorescence is a cluster of several flowers each about a centimeter wide. The star-shaped flower has pointed violet lobes with yellowish bases coming together at a purple throat.
