= Lucy Adeline Briggs Cole Rawson Peckinpah Smallman =

American watercolor botanical artist and collector

- Born: 25 August 1840; Middleboro, Massachusetts
- Died: 12 October 1920 (aged 80)
- Resting place: Mountain View Cemetery (Oakland, California)
- Style: Botanical artist

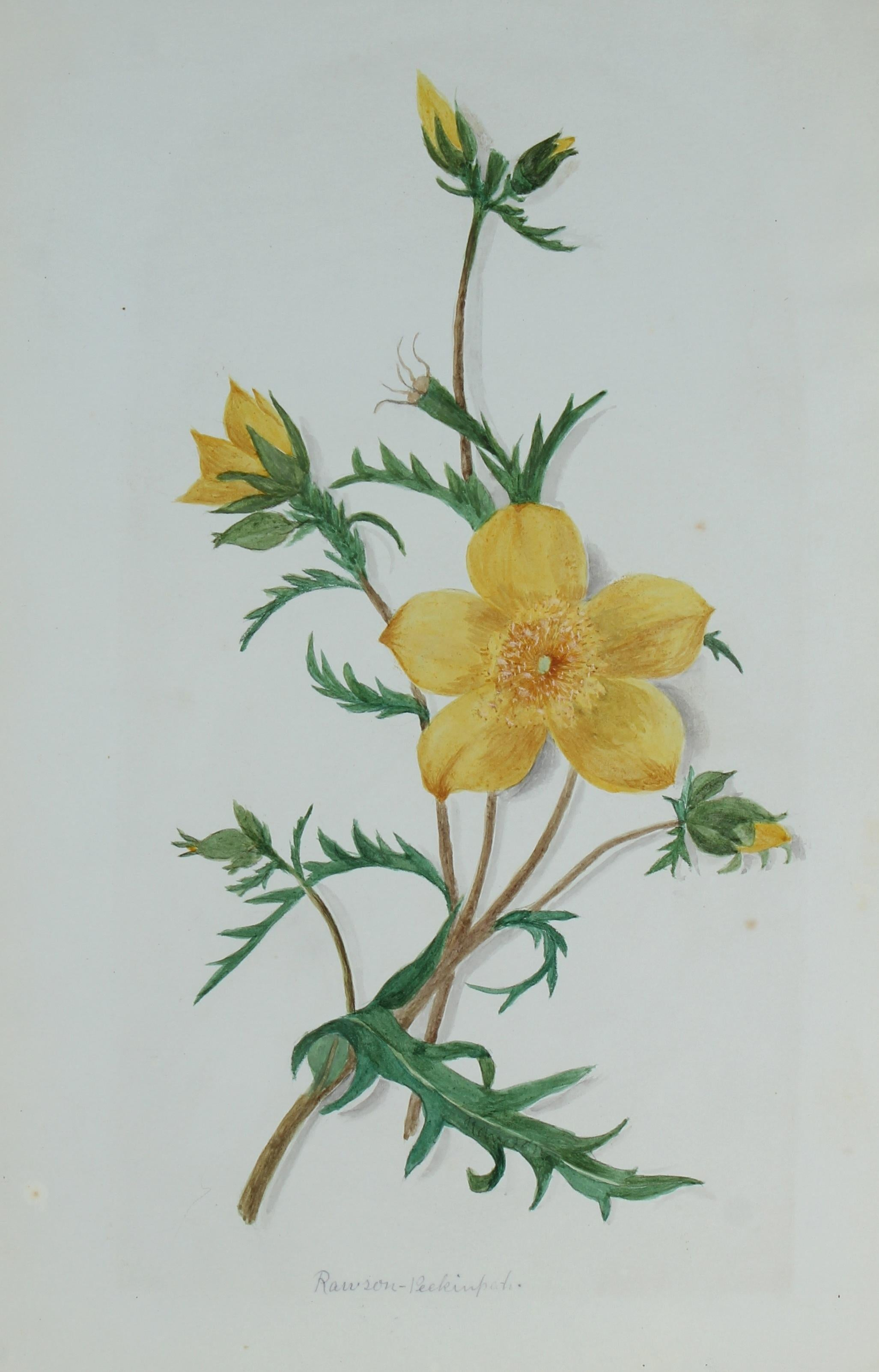
Painting of an unidentified yellow flower, signed Rawson-Peckinpah.

Lucy Adeline Briggs (25 August 1840 – 12 October 1920) was an American watercolor botanical artist and botanical collector.

== Life ==
Born in Middleboro, Massachusetts, Lucy married her first husband, James Cole, in 1860, who died due to drowning in the Mokelumne River in 1862. Lucy subsequently married her second husband a year later, Julius Addison Rawson, in San Francisco. Rawson then died, along with Lucy's only child, in 1877. She then re-married in 1886, to Thaddeus Edgar Peckinpah. They lived near the Napa Valley, where Peckinpah had purchased 91 acres of land. Later, she married James Knight Smallman in 1912.

In the botanical literature, she is often referred to simply as Mrs. Peckinpah, or Mrs. L.A. Rawson Peckinpah.

== Art ==
According to the History of Solano and Napa Counties, California, published 1912, "as a close student of nature [Lucy] has made a deep study of botany.... Her painted collection of California wild flowers numbers over three hundred." Lucy also taught painting at the Young Ladies' Seminary of Benicia. Her artwork was exhibited with the San Francisco Art Association and the Arriola Relief Fund in 1872, and the California State Fair in 1878.

== Basket collecting ==
History of Solano and Napa Counties, California noted that Mrs Peckinpah possessed "a fine collection of Indian baskets and curios," of which a portion are now held at the National Museum of the American Indian, that had been acquired by Homer Earle Sargent, Jr. after her death. In 1917, she had gifted a portion of the basket collection, and other items, to the Oakland Museum of California.

== Botanical legacy ==
The History of Solano and Napa Counties, California notes that Lucy collected type material for multiple Californian species, two of which eponymise one of her married names: Rawson. These are:

- Arabis rectissima Greene, a synonym of Boechera rectissima (Greene) Al-Shehbaz.
- Nemophila venosa Jeps., a synonym of Nemophila menziesii var. menziesii.
- Collomia rawsoniana Greene, or Rawson's Flaming Trumpet.
- Senecio rawsonianus Greene (a synonym of Senecio aronicoides DC.), or the Rayless Ragwort.
- Viola anodonta Greene.

Species collected by Lucy are today held by the Steere Herbarium, New York Botanical Gardens, the Greene-Nieuwland Herbarium at the University of Notre Dame, and the National Herbarium of Victoria at the Royal Botanic Gardens Victoria.
