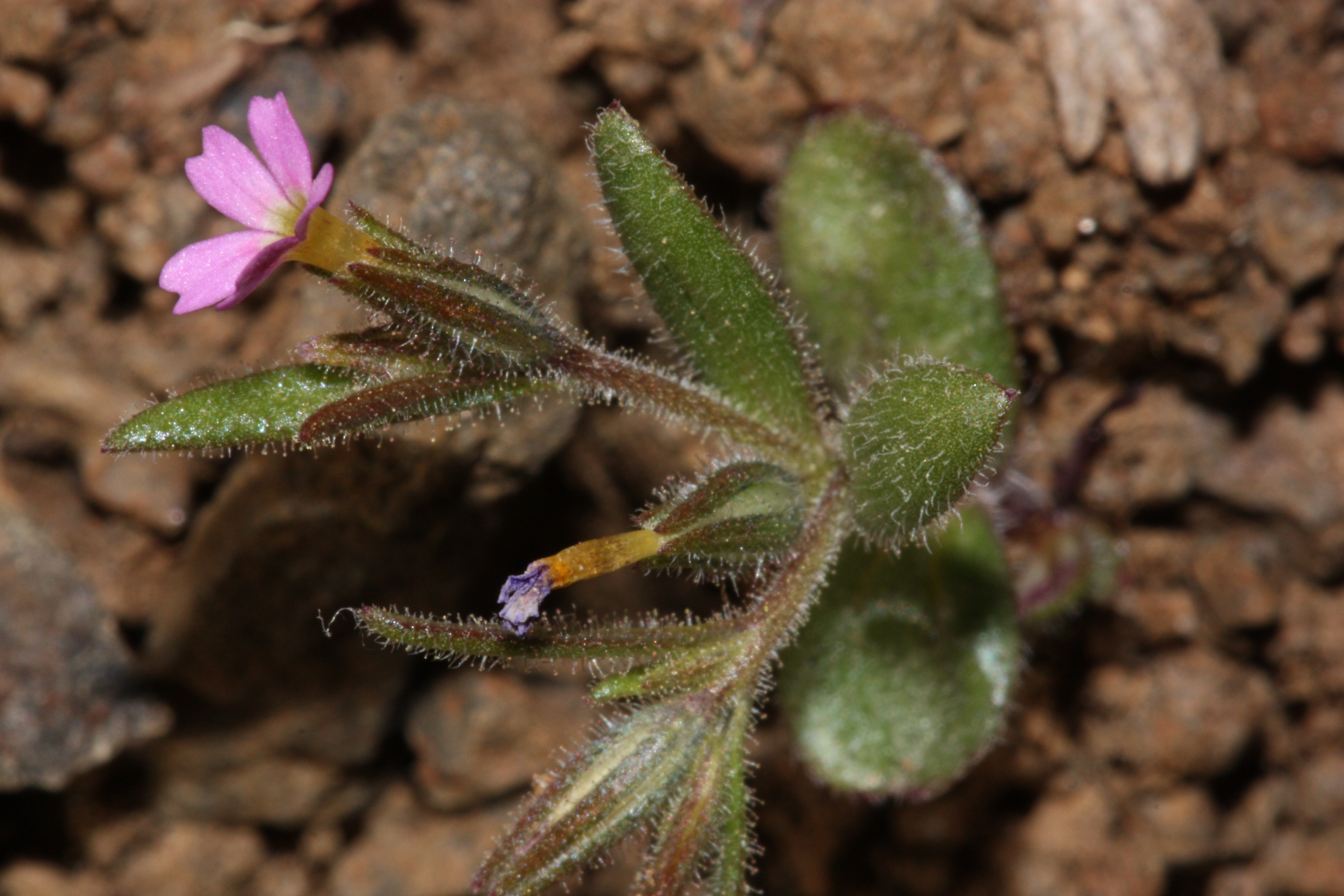

Scientific classification
- Kingdom: Plantae
- Clade: Embryophytes
- Clade: Tracheophytes
- Clade: Spermatophytes
- Clade: Angiosperms
- Clade: Eudicots
- Clade: Asterids
- Order: Ericales
- Family: Polemoniaceae
- Genus: Microsteris; Greene
- Species: M. gracilis

Binomial name
- Microsteris gracilis (Hook.) Greene

Varieties
- M. g. var. gracilis; M. g. var. humilior

Synonyms
- List: Myotoca Griseb.; Collomia bellidifolia Douglas ex Hook.; Collomia chubutensis Speg.; Collomia eritrichoides Griseb.; Collomia gracilis (Hook.) Douglas ex Benth.; Collomia gracilis var. andicola Benth.; Collomia gracilis var. congesta Wedd.; Collomia gracilis var. eritrichoides (Griseb.) Brand; Collomia gracilis var. humilior Hook.; Collomia gracilis var. minuartioides Franch.; Collomia humilis Douglas ex Hook.; Collomia micrantha Kellogg; Eutoca gracilis Griseb. ex Brand; Gilia gracilis Hook.; Gilia gracilis Phil.; Gilia gracilis subvar. angustifolia Brand; Gilia gracilis subvar. bellidifolia Brand; Gilia gracilis subvar. californica Brand; Gilia gracilis var. congesta (Wedd.) Borsini; Gilia gracilis subvar. congesta (Wedd.) Brand; Gilia gracilis var. elatior Suksd.; Gilia gracilis var. eritrichoides Brand; Gilia gracilis subsp. eugracilis Brand; Gilia gracilis var. euphorbioides Brand; Gilia gracilis var. glabella Suksd.; Gilia gracilis var. humilior (Hook.) H.St.John; Gilia gracilis subsp. humilis (Greene) Brand; Gilia gracilis var. micrantha (Kellogg) Brand; Gilia gracilis var. minuartioides (Franch.) Borsini; Gilia gracilis var. nana Brand; Gilia gracilis var. pratensis Suksd.; Gilia gracilis subvar. spathulifolia Speg.; Gilia gracilis subsp. spirillifera Brand; Gilia gracilis var. stricta Brand; Gilia gracilis var. villosa Jeps. & Hoover; Gilia humilis (Greene) Piper; Gilia humilis subsp. glabella (Greene) Piper; Gilia micrantha (Kellogg) A.Nelson; Gilia microsteris Piper; Gilia traskiae Eastw. ex Milliken; Microsteris andicola Greene; Microsteris californica Greene; Microsteris diffusa A.Heller; Microsteris glabella Greene; Microsteris gracilis subsp. humilis (Greene) V.E.Grant; Microsteris heterophylla Brockman; Microsteris humilis Greene; Microsteris macdougalii A.Heller; Microsteris micrantha (Kellogg) Greene; Microsteris stricta Greene; Microsteris traskiae (Eastw. ex Milliken) Davidson & Moxley; Myotoca eritrichoides Griseb. ex Brand; Navarretia eritrichoides (Griseb.) Kuntze; Navarretia gracilis (Hook.) Kuntze; Phlox gracilis (Hook.) Greene; Phlox gracilis var. humilior (Hook.) B.Boivin; Phlox gracilis subsp. humilis (Greene) H.Mason; Polemonium morenonis Kuntze

= Microsteris =

Plant genus in the phlox family

Microsteris is a genus of flowering plants in the phlox family containing the single species Microsteris gracilis, known by the common name slender phlox.

The segregation of this species into a genus of its own is controversial, and many botanists continue to include the plant in genus Phlox. Genetic analysis is continuing.

== Description ==
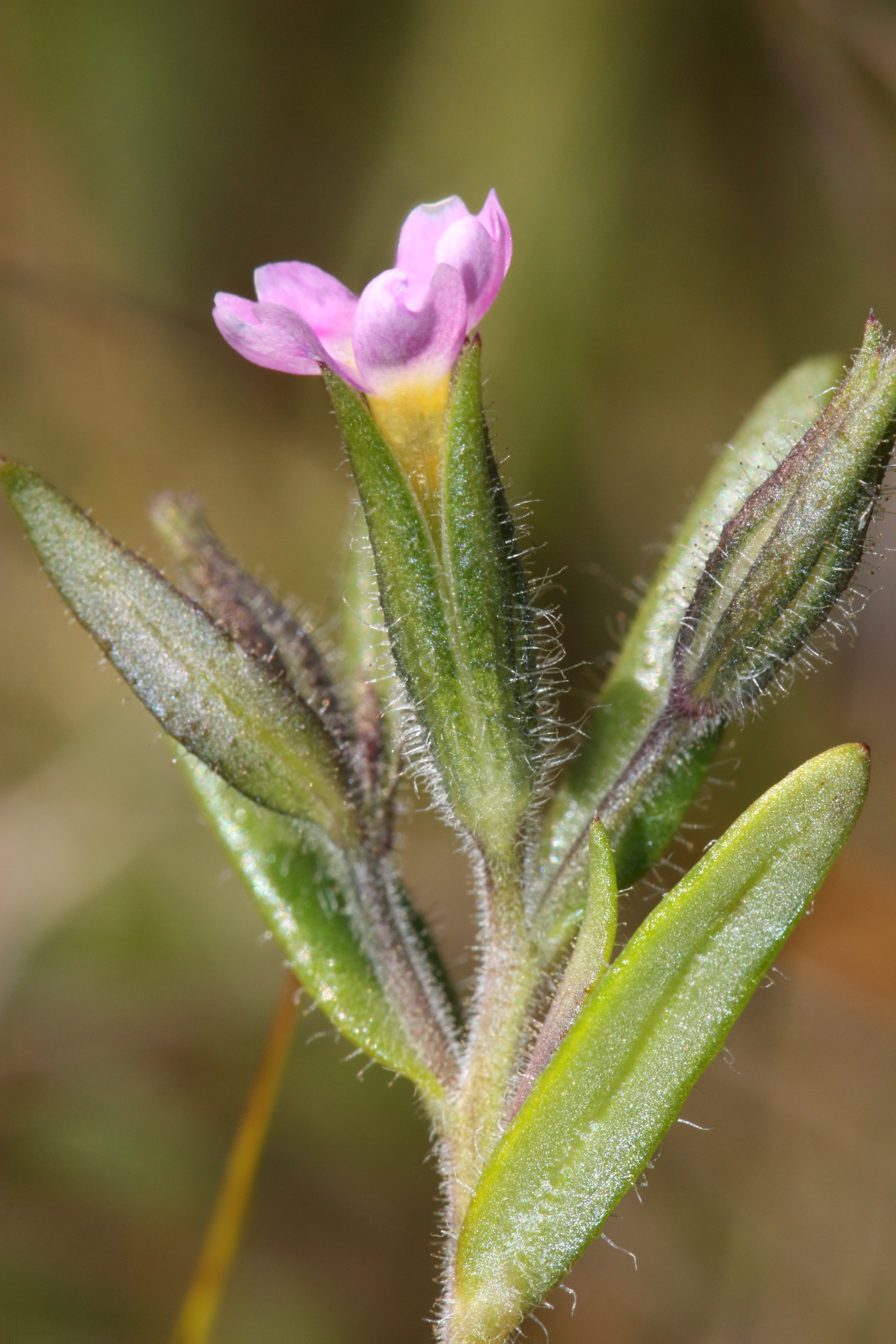
The flower has a tubular yellow throat encased in a tubular gladular-hairy calyx. Corolla lobes are just 1 to 2 mm long.

Microsteris gracilis is an annual herb which is variable in shape, taking a decumbent, branching, sometimes almost tuftlike form or growing erect and very slender. Its maximum height approaches 20 centimeters, but it may be much smaller.

The lance-shaped leaves are 1 to 3 centimeters long and oppositely arranged except for the upper ones, which are alternate. The herbage is glandular and hairy in texture. The inflorescence at the top of the stem bears one or more small flowers.

The flower has a tubular throat around a centimeter long encased in a tubular calyx of sepals. The flat corolla has five flat-tipped or notched lobes just 1 or 2 millimeters long. The flower is white to bright pink with a yellowish throat.

== Taxonomy ==
In 1829 William Jackson Hooker named a new species in the Gilia genus, Gilia gracilis. The genus Microsteris was named and described by Edward Lee Greene, including Microsteris gracilis. Together with its genus the species is classified in the Polemoniaceae family.

Although Microsteris is monotypic genus 13 species names have been created that are a synonym another species or one of its two accepted varieties.

Table of Species
Name	Year	Synonym of:	Notes
Microsteris andicola Greene	1898	var. gracilis	= het.
Microsteris californica Greene	1898	var. gracilis	= het.
Microsteris depressa (M.E.Jones ex A.Gray) Davidson & Moxley	1923	L. depressum	≡ hom.
Microsteris diffusa A.Heller	1899	var. gracilis	= het.
Microsteris gilioides (Benth.) Davidson & Moxley	1923	A. gilioides	≡ hom.
Microsteris glabella Greene	1898	var. humilior	= het.
Microsteris heterophylla Brockman	1947	var. gracilis	= het., without a Latin descr.
Microsteris humilis Greene	1898	var. humilior	= het.
Microsteris larsenii (A.Gray) Brockman	1947	C. larsenii	≡ hom.
Microsteris macdougalii A.Heller	1899	var. gracilis	= het.
Microsteris micrantha (Kellogg) Greene	1898	var. gracilis	= het.
Microsteris stricta Greene	1898	var. gracilis	= het.
Microsteris traskiae (Eastw. ex Milliken) Davidson & Moxley	1923	var. gracilis	= het.
Notes: ≡ homotypic synonym; = heterotypic synonym

The genus Myotoca with the single species Myotoca eritrichoides was created in 1907 by August Brand and attributed to August Grisebach and is synonymous with Microsteris and variety gracilis respectively. In addition there are five alternate classifications for the species that are homotypic synonyms.

Table of Synonyms
Name	Year
Collomia gracilis (Hook.) Douglas ex Benth.	1834
Gilia gracilis Hook.	1829
Navarretia gracilis (Hook.) Kuntze	1891
Phlox gracilis (Hook.) Greene	1887
Polemonium morenonis Kuntze	1898

=== Names ===
The genus name, Microsteris, is a Botanical Latin compound meaning 'tiny star', a reference to the small, star shaped flower.

== Distribution ==
Microsteris gracilis is native to western North America from northwestern Canada to the American Midwest and West Coast, through Mexico, as well as South America from Peru to southern Chile.

In Canada it does sometimes occur in the Yukon, but its has not established a recurring population. It is stated to be introduced to the Yukon in the Flora of Alberta, but is listed as native in Plants of the World Online. In British Columbia and Alberta it is found in southern parts of the provinces. In the northwestern United States it is common throughout Washington and Oregon, mostly found in southern Idaho, and widely scattered in Montana. Southward in Wyoming it is recorded in all but four counties and is found on both the western and eastern slopes of Colorado. It reaches its easternmost native distribution in a few western counties of South Dakota and Nebraska.

In the southwestern US the species is native to all the diverse plant communities in California, with records in almost every county. It is likewise found in all but one county in Nevada and all but five counties in Utah. Plants grow in most of Arizona, but only in western counties of New Mexico. South of the border it is found in just two northwestern Mexican states, Baja California and Sonora.
