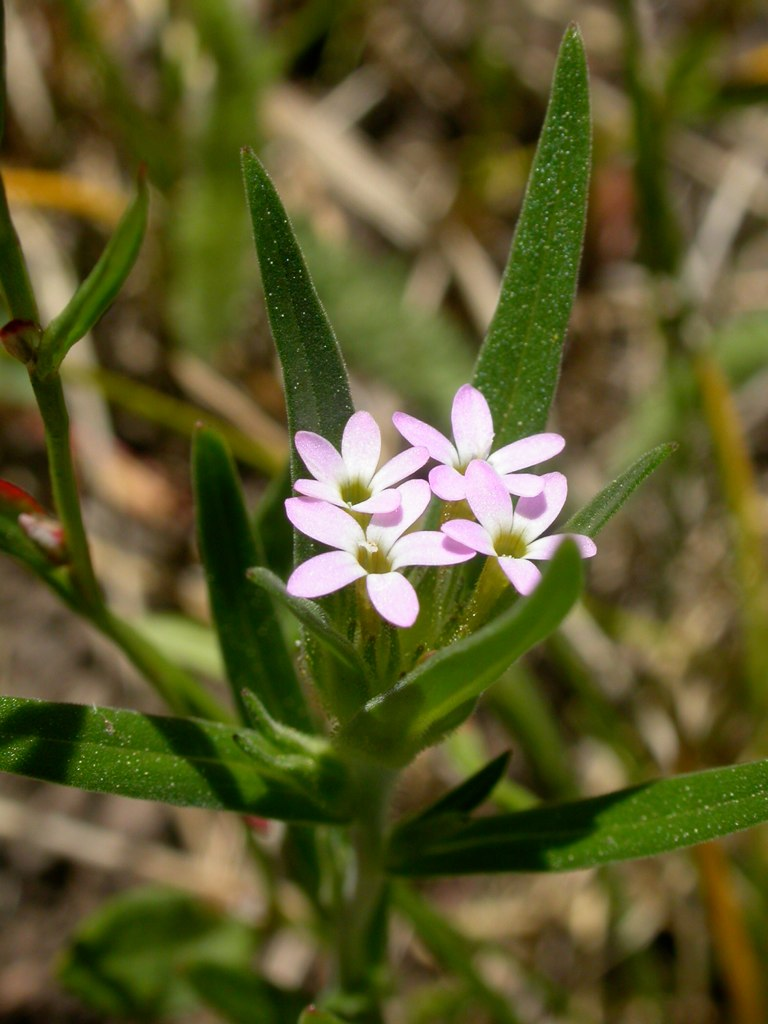
- Collomia linearis

Scientific classification
- Kingdom: Plantae
- Clade: Tracheophytes
- Clade: Angiosperms
- Clade: Eudicots
- Clade: Asterids
- Order: Ericales
- Family: Polemoniaceae
- Genus: Collomia; Nutt. (1818)

Species
- See text

Synonyms
- Collomiastrum (Brand) S.L.Welsh (2003); Courtoisia Rchb. (1829)

= Collomia =

Genus of flowering plants

Collomia is a genus of flowering plants in the family Polemoniaceae. Species in the genus are known generally as trumpets, mountain trumpets, or trumpet flowers. They are native to North America and southern South America. The genus name comes from the Greek kolla ("glue"), a reference to the seeds, which become gelatinous in texture when wet.

== Species ==
There are about 15 species in the genus. They include:

- Collomia biflora (Ruiz & Pav.) Brand
- Collomia debilis (S.Watson) Greene - alpine collomia
- Collomia diversifolia Greene – serpentine collomia
- Collomia grandiflora Douglas ex Lindl. – grand collomia, largeflowered collomia, California strawflower
- Collomia heterophylla Hook. – variableleaf collomia
- Collomia larsenii (A.Gray) Payson – talus collomia
- Collomia linearis Nutt. – tiny trumpet, narrow-leaf mountain trumpet
- Collomia macrocalyx Leiberg ex Brand – bristleflower collomia
- Collomia mazama Coville – Mt. Mazama collomia, Crater Lake collomia
- Collomia rawsoniana Greene – flaming trumpet, Rawson's flaming trumpet
- Collomia renacta Joyal – Barren Valley collomia
- Collomia tenella A.Gray – diffuse collomia
- Collomia tinctoria Kellogg – staining collomia, yellowstain collomia
- Collomia tracyi R.Mason – Tracy's collomia
- Collomia wilkenii L.A.Johnson & R.L.Johnson – Dieter's trumpet
