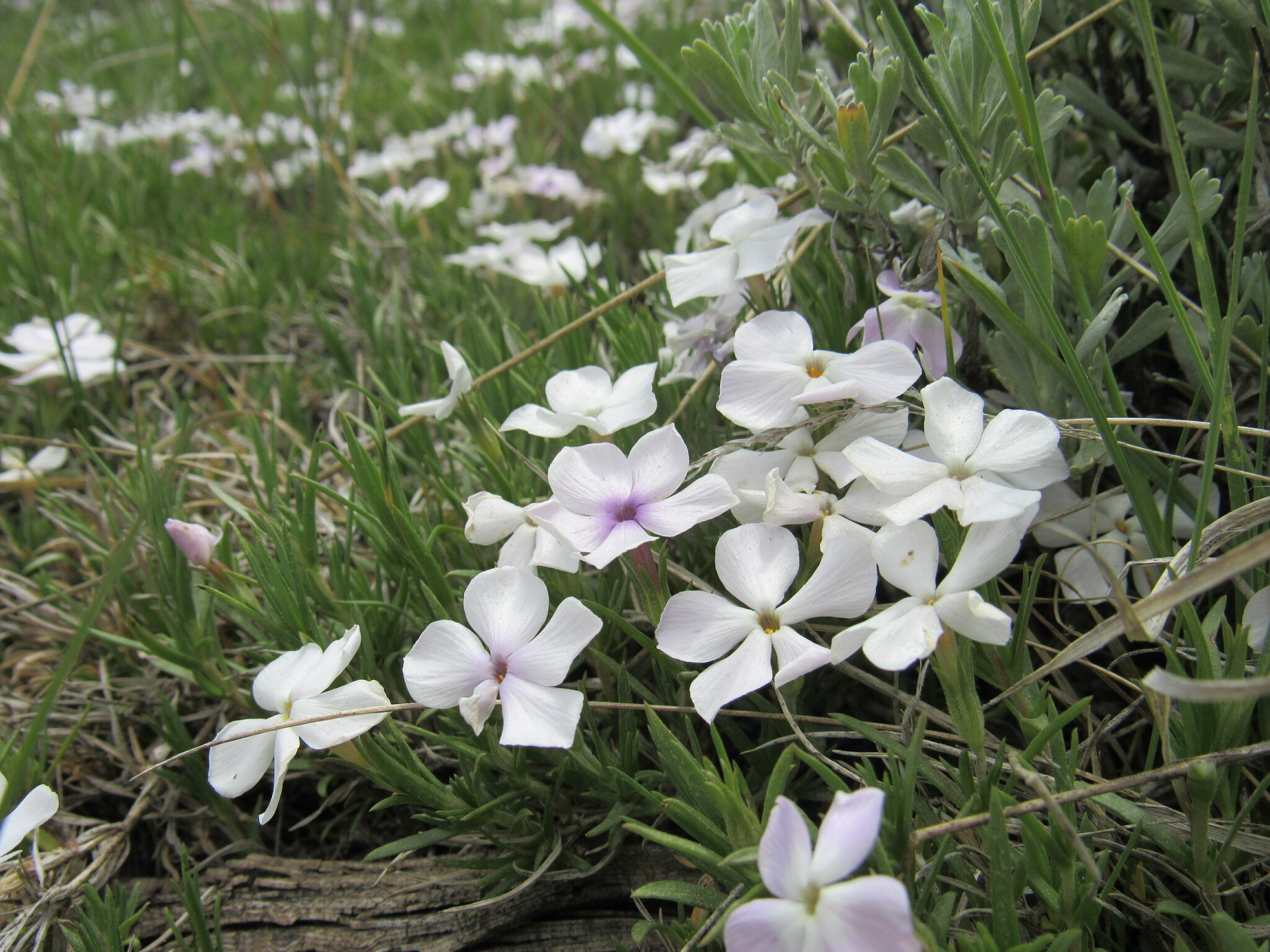
- Near Gunnison, Colorado

Conservation status
- Apparently Secure (NatureServe)

Scientific classification
- Kingdom: Plantae
- Clade: Embryophytes
- Clade: Tracheophytes
- Clade: Spermatophytes
- Clade: Angiosperms
- Clade: Eudicots
- Clade: Asterids
- Order: Ericales
- Family: Polemoniaceae
- Genus: Phlox
- Species: P. multiflora

Binomial name
- Phlox multiflora A.Nelson

Subspecies
- P. m. subsp. depressa; P. m. subsp. multiflora

Synonyms
- Phlox costata; Phlox dasyphylla; Phlox depressa; Phlox patula

= Phlox multiflora =

Plant species in the phlox family

Phlox multiflora, the Rocky Mountain phlox, is a low growing perennial plant native to the Rocky Mountains and parts of the Great Basin in western North America. It has white to lavender flowers.

== Description ==
Rocky mountain phlox is a low growing perennial plant that grows from a taproot. The main stems trail along the ground and are woody, as much as 30 centimeters (12 in) long, though individual plants are more typically 8–25 cm (3–10 in) wide. Shorter branches rise off main stems and are covered in the leaves. Its numerous stems rarely grow to even 15 centimeters (6 in) tall, packed together forming a loose mat of about 5 to 10 cm (2 to 4 in) in height. Large numbers of plants can be found covering shrubby hillsides in some areas.

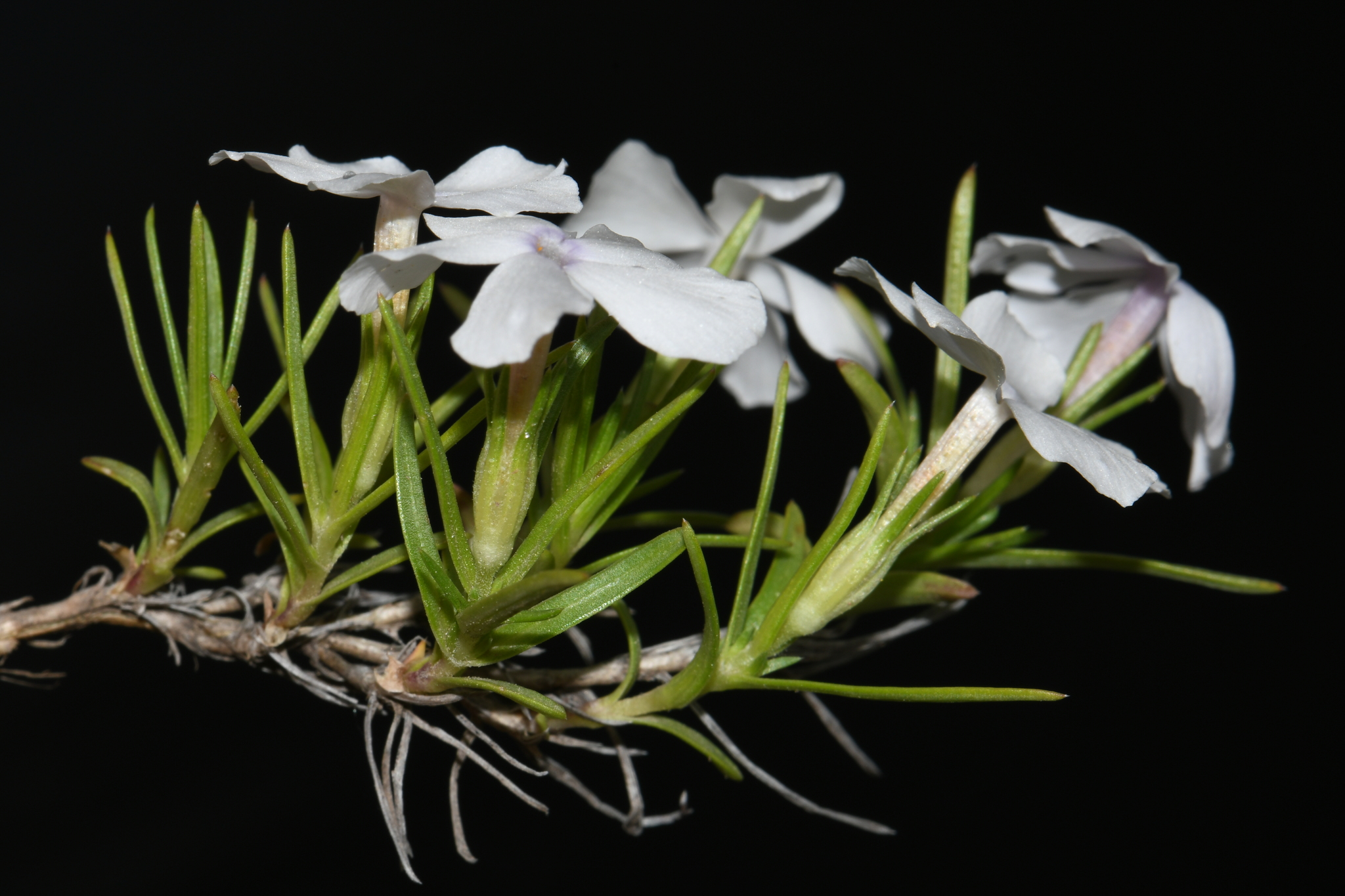
Side view of a detached stem from Yellowstone National Park

Fully developed leaves are thin, needle-like, just 1–2 millimeters wide and usually 12–30 mm long, though occasionally even the longest leaves will be just 10 mm. Their surface is often hairless, but can have a slight rough and grainy texture or be slightly ciliate, fringed with hairs on the leaf edges. Leaves attach to the stems in pairs on opposite sides of the stems.

When blooming the whole of the plant surface can be covered in a carpet of flowers. The flowers are salverform, the petals open up to a flat surface and unite at the base into a tube extending downwards at a right angle. Each flower has five petal-lobes and five sepals with three lobes to the style. The flower petals can be lilac, pale blue, pink, or white. The flower's tube is 10–14 mm long while each petal is 6–11 mm. The stamens either extend slightly out of the floral tube or are contained within it. If the flowers have a pedicel, a flower stalk, it will be short. They are at the end of the stems in groups of one to three. Blooming can start as early as May or be ongoing as late as August in its native habitat, the start of blooming depending on elevation and orientation of the location with north facing slopes blooming considerably later than south facing ones.

Though similar to spiny phlox (Phlox hoodii), its leaves are much less stiff.

== Taxonomy ==
Phlox multiflora was scientifically described in 1898 by the botanist Aven Nelson. The type specimen was collected in Telephone Canyon in the hills near Laramie, Wyoming on 16 June 1897 by Nelson. It is classified in the genus Phlox as part of the family Polemoniaceae and has two accepted subspecies according to Plants of the World Online. The USDA Natural Resources Conservation Service (NRCS) additionally recognizes subspecies patula. It also has been observed hybridizing with Phlox hoodii in lower parts of the Uinta Mountains.

- Phlox multiflora subsp. depressa
  The more widespread subspecies, it was described as a variety by Elias Emanuel Nelson in 1899 and elevated to a subspecies by Edgar T. Wherry in 1955. It is found from New Mexico to Oregon. It is distinguished by being more cushion-like and forming mounds just 4–8 cm in height according to Wherry.
- Phlox multiflora subsp. multiflora
  The autonymic subspecies is found from Colorado to Montana. Its tufts are taller, 8–15 cm according to Wherry.

There are nine synonyms of the species or its two subspecies including four species names.

Table of Synonyms
Name	Year	Rank	Synonym of:	Notes
Phlox costata Rydb.	1900	species	subsp. depressa	= het.
Phlox dasyphylla Brand	1907	species	subsp. multiflora	= het.
Phlox depressa Rydb.	1906	species	subsp. multiflora	= het.
Phlox kelseyi var. costata (Rydb.) Brand	1907	variety	subsp. depressa	= het.
Phlox multiflora var. depressa E.E.Nelson	1899	variety	subsp. depressa	≡ hom.
Phlox multiflora var. intermedia Brand	1921	variety	subsp. multiflora	= het.
Phlox multiflora subsp. patula (A.Nelson) Wherry	1956	subspecies	subsp. multiflora	= het.
Phlox multiflora subsp. typica Wherry	1941	subspecies	P. multiflora	≡ hom., not validly publ.
Phlox patula A.Nelson	1924	species	subsp. multiflora	= het.
Notes: ≡ homotypic synonym; = heterotypic synonym

=== Names ===
The species name, multiflora, is Botanical Latin meaning "many flowers". Due to being a very common and typical plant of the Rocky Mountains it is known as Rocky Mountain phlox. It is also known by the related common names flowery phlox, many-flowered phlox, manyflowered phlox, and multiflowered phlox. Though it frequently referred to as white phlox, white flowered strains of Phlox divaricata are also called this. Other names include mountain phlox, rockhill phlox, spreading phlox, and Yellowstone phlox.

In the Cheyenne language it is known as heškovaneo.

== Range and habitat ==
Rocky Mountain phlox is native to eight western US states. It grows in north-central New Mexico, but the NRCS only records it in Mora County. It is widespread in western Colorado with more records in the central north and another concentration in the central mountains. In Wyoming it is found in every county in the western two-thirds of the state. Plants are mostly in the southwestern mountain counties of Montana, but there are also records of its in Flathead County in the north. The range in Idaho is in the northeastern mountains and the eastern part of the state, but though native to Oregon it is only recorded in Union County in the northeast. It is known from five northern Utah counties, Box Elder, Rich, Summit, Daggett, and Uintah. To the west it is only found in as a disjunct population in the Jarbidge Mountains in Elko County, Nevada.

It usually grows in fairly rocky areas and can be found in both open and wooded habitats from above timberline to the highest parts of the foothills at elevations of 2,200 to 3,265 meters (7,218–10,712 ft). The species is associated with habitats dominated by sagebrush, quaking aspens, Rocky Mountain ponderosa pine forests, Douglas-fir forests, and lodgepole pines.

== Uses ==
In the traditional medicine of the Cheyenne, as recorded by George Bird Grinnell and his collaborators, Rocky Mountain phlox is used as a mild stimulant. The leaves and flowers are infused into warm water after being pulverized. The liquid is then rubbed into the body of a person experiencing numbness and a small amount might be taken as a tea.

=== Cultivation ===
Rocky Mountain phlox is grown in native plant gardens, though like other cushion phloxes from the western United States it not a common garden plant. It is valued by gardeners for the pleasant scent of its flowers. Plants can be propagated both by seed and by the division of mature individuals in autumn. According to Coloradan author Lauren Springer, it requires dry conditions and is successful in sunny locations. However, according to Australian writer and botanist Frances Bodkin it is intolerant of drought and prefers moist, loamy soil.
