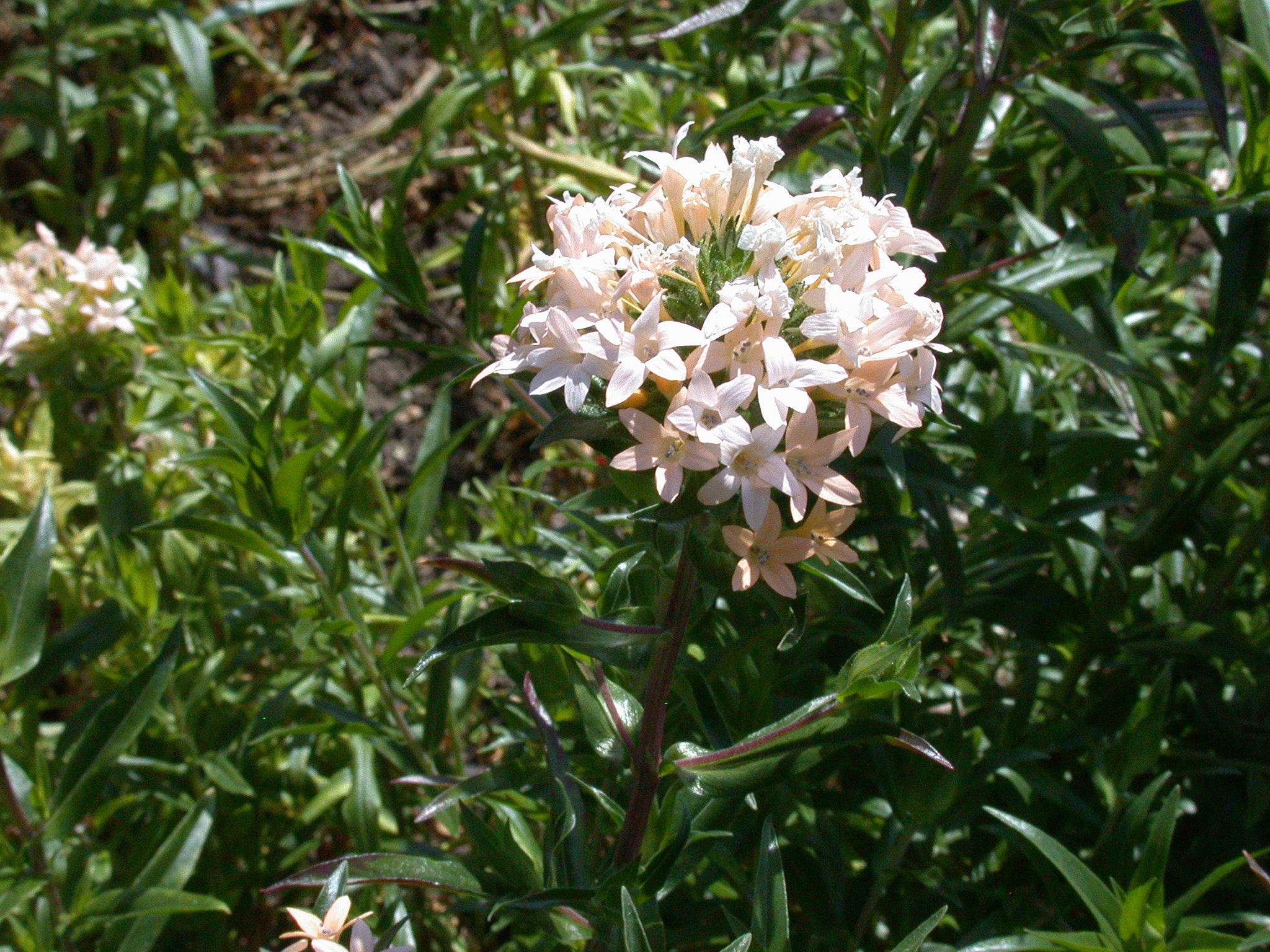

Conservation status
- Secure (NatureServe)

Scientific classification
- Kingdom: Plantae
- Clade: Tracheophytes
- Clade: Angiosperms
- Clade: Eudicots
- Clade: Asterids
- Order: Ericales
- Family: Polemoniaceae
- Genus: Collomia
- Species: C. grandiflora

Binomial name
- Collomia grandiflora Douglas ex Lindl.

Synonyms
- Gilia grandiflora; Collomia scabra

= Collomia grandiflora =

Plant species in the phlox family

Collomia grandiflora is a western North American annual plant in the phlox family (Polemoniaceae), known by the common names grand collomia, large-flowered mountain trumpet, and large-flowered collomia. It usually appears in sandy habitats and is cultivated as an ornamental.

== Description ==
The plant grows to about 1 metre (3 ft 3 in) and produces an erect, hairy or fuzzy stem which may be red to green in color. Arranged at wide intervals along the stem are long, lance-shaped leaves growing to about 10 centimetres (4 in), the lowermost sometimes toothed along the edges. Atop the stem is an inflorescence of several flowers in white to yellow or orange. Lower flowerheads may branch from the axils of the alternate leaves. Each tubular, flat-faced flower is 2 or 3 cm wide with five fused and curving light-colored petals and five stamens tipped with anthers which bear blue pollen. The fruit is a capsule containing sticky seeds.

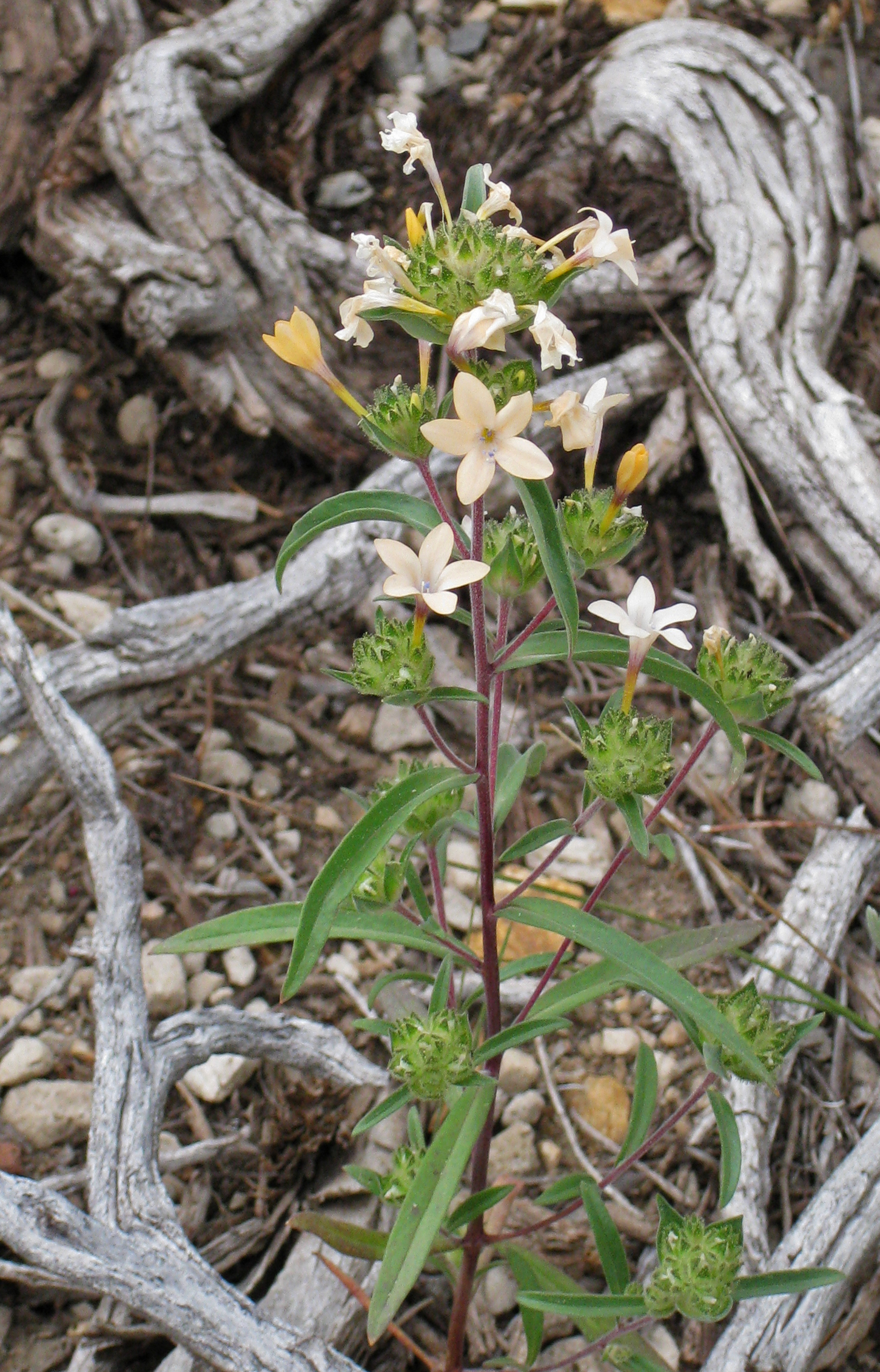
C. grandiflora, with purple stem and top and side flower heads

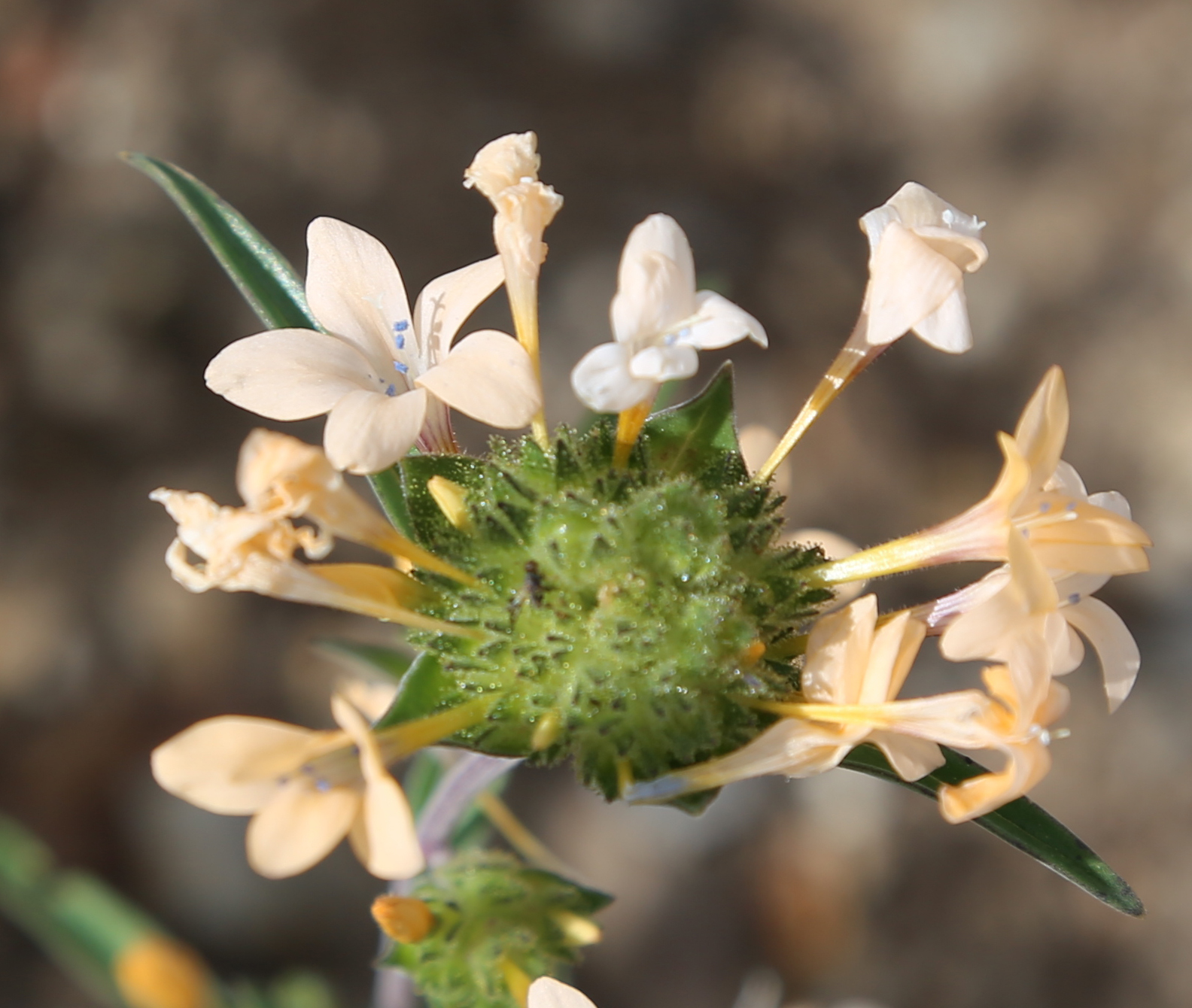
Five-petaled apricot flower (top left), with blue anthers and three-branched style

== Taxonomy ==
Collomia grandiflora was given its scientific name by John Lindley, who gave credit to David Douglas. It is classified in the genus Collomia as part of the Polemoniaceae family. It has no accepted subspecies or varieties, but has several among its 16 synonyms.

Table of Synonyms
Name	Year	Rank	Notes
Collomia grandiflora var. axillaris A.Nelson	1911	variety	= het.
Collomia grandiflora f. axillaris (A.Nelson) Wherry	1944	form	= het.
Collomia grandiflora var. cryptantha A.Gray	1870	variety	= het.
Collomia grandiflora var. cryptantha Regel	1869	variety	= het.
Collomia grandiflora f. cryptantha (Regel) Wherry	1944	form	= het.
Collomia grandiflora subsp. diffusa (Mulford) Piper	1906	subspecies	= het.
Collomia grandiflora f. diffusa (Mulford) Wherry	1944	form	= het.
Collomia grandiflora proles europaea P.Fourn.	1937	proles	= het., not validly publ.
Collomia grandiflora f. scabra (Greene) Wherry	1944	form	= het.
Collomia grandiflora var. tenuiflora Benth.	1845	variety	= het.
Collomia grandiflora var. tenuiflora DC.	1845	variety	= het.
Collomia grandiflora f. tenuiflora (Benth.) Wherry	1944	form	= het.
Collomia scabra Greene	1910	species	= het.
Gilia grandiflora (Douglas ex Lindl.) A.Gray	1882	species	≡ hom., nom. illeg., homonym. post.
Gilia grandiflora var. axillaris A.Nelson & J.F.Macbr.	1918	variety	= het.
Gilia grandiflora var. diffusa Mulford	1894	variety	= het.
Notes: ≡ homotypic synonym; = heterotypic synonym

== Uses ==
Some Native Americans used the roots and leaves for medicinal purposes.
