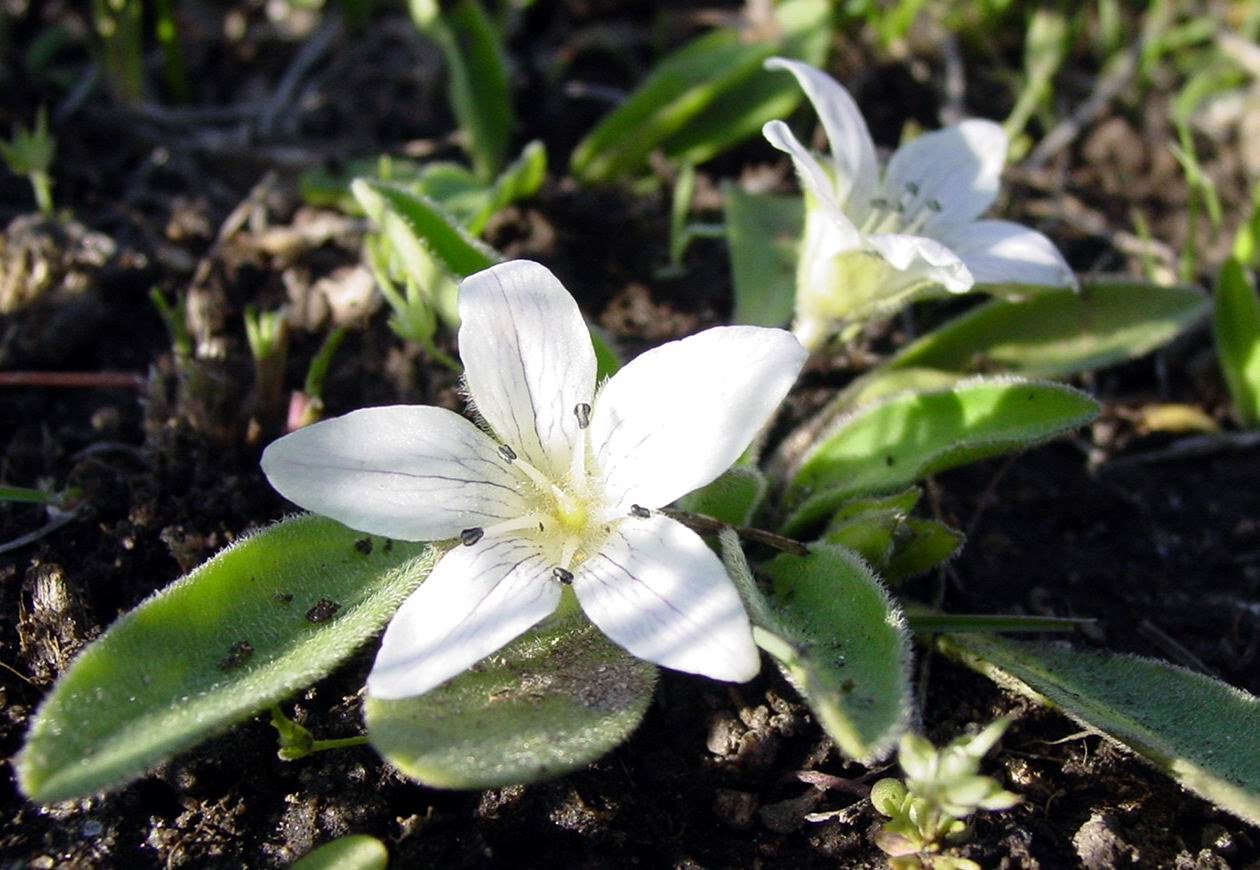

Scientific classification
- Kingdom: Plantae
- Clade: Tracheophytes
- Clade: Angiosperms
- Clade: Eudicots
- Clade: Asterids
- Order: Boraginales
- Family: Hydrophyllaceae
- Genus: Hesperochiron
- Species: H. nanus

Binomial name
- Hesperochiron nanus (Lindl.) Greene

Synonyms
- List: Capnorea californica (Benth.) Greene; Capnorea incana Greene; Capnorea lasiantha Greene; Capnorea leporina Greene; Capnorea nana (Lindl.) Raf.; Capnorea strigosa Greene; Capnorea watsoniana Greene; Hesperochiron californicus (Benth.) S.Watson; Hesperochiron californicus var. benthamianus Brand; Hesperochiron californicus var. incanus (Greene) Brand; Hesperochiron californicus var. latifolius Brand; Hesperochiron californicus var. strigosus Brand; Hesperochiron californicus var. watsonianus Brand; Hesperochiron incanus Garrett; Hesperochiron lasianthus (Greene) H.St.John; Hesperochiron latifolius Kellogg; Menyanthes pumila Douglas ex Griseb., not validly publ.; Nicotiana nana Lindl.; Nierembergia nana Miers; Ourisia californica Benth.

= Hesperochiron nanus =

Species of plant

Hesperochiron nanus, synonym Hesperochiron californicus, is a species of flowering plant, native from the western United States to northern Mexico (Baja California). The genus Hesperochiron is placed in the family Hydrophyllaceae. The species was first described by John Lindley in 1824 as Nicotiana nana.
