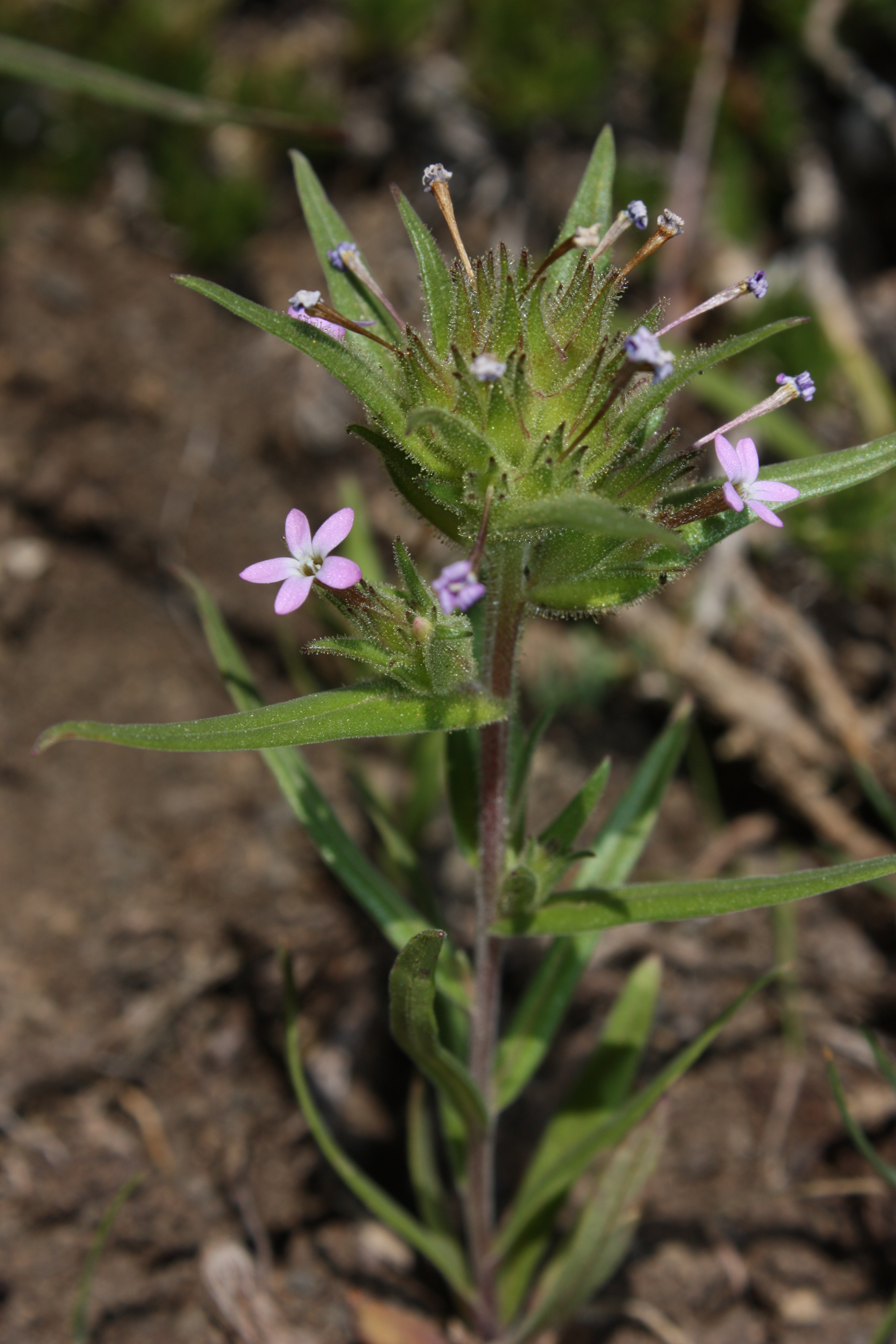

Conservation status
- Secure (NatureServe)

Scientific classification
- Kingdom: Plantae
- Clade: Embryophytes
- Clade: Tracheophytes
- Clade: Spermatophytes
- Clade: Angiosperms
- Clade: Eudicots
- Clade: Asterids
- Order: Ericales
- Family: Polemoniaceae
- Genus: Collomia
- Species: C. linearis

Binomial name
- Collomia linearis Nutt.

Synonyms
- List: Collomia lanceolata; Collomia linearis var. boulderensis; Collomia linearis var. congesta; Collomia linearis f. congesta; Collomia linearis var. humilis; Collomia linearis f. humilis; Collomia linearis f. lanceolata; Collomia linearis var. picta; Collomia linearis f. picta; Collomia linearis var. subulata; Collomia parviflora f. boulderensis; Collomia parviflora f. congesta; Collomia parviflora f. humilis; Collomia parviflora f. lanceolata; Collomia parviflora f. picta; Collomia tinctoria var. subulata; Collomia tinctoria f. subulata; Gilia linearis; Gilia linearis var. subulata; Hoitzia linearis; Navarretia linearis

= Collomia linearis =

Plant species in the phlox family

Collomia linearis is a species of flowering plant in the phlox family known by the common names tiny trumpet and slenderleaf collomia. This tiny wildflower is native to North America, where it is fairly widespread across the north and west. It is an annual herb, rarely exceeding 30 centimetres (12 in) in height, with a velvety erect stem bearing long, narrow green leaves. Atop the stem is a cluster of up to 20 white or light pink flowers, each about a centimeter across. Each has five small rounded petals and stamens tipped with anthers bearing white pollen.

== Taxonomy ==
Collomia linearis was given its scientific name in 1818 by Thomas Nuttall. It is part of the genus Collomia which is classified in the Polemoniaceae family. The species has no accepted varieties, but has five among its 21 synonyms as well as 10 forms of this species or mistakenly described as part of other species.

Table of Synonyms
Name	Year	Rank	Notes
Collomia lanceolata Greene ex Brand	1907	species	= het.
Collomia linearis var. boulderensis Daniels	1911	variety	= het.
Collomia linearis var. congesta Lunell	1916	variety	= het.
Collomia linearis var. humilis Brand	1907	variety	= het.
Collomia linearis var. picta Lunell	1908	variety	= het.
Collomia linearis var. subulata (A.Gray) A.Gray	1870	variety	= het.
Collomia tinctoria var. subulata (A.Gray) Brand	1907	variety	= het.
Gilia linearis (Nutt.) A.Gray	1882	species	≡ hom.
Gilia linearis var. subulata A.Gray	1886	variety	= het.
Hoitzia linearis Spreng.	1824	species	= het.
Navarretia linearis (Nutt.) Kuntze	1891	species	≡ hom.
Notes: ≡ homotypic synonym; = heterotypic synonym
