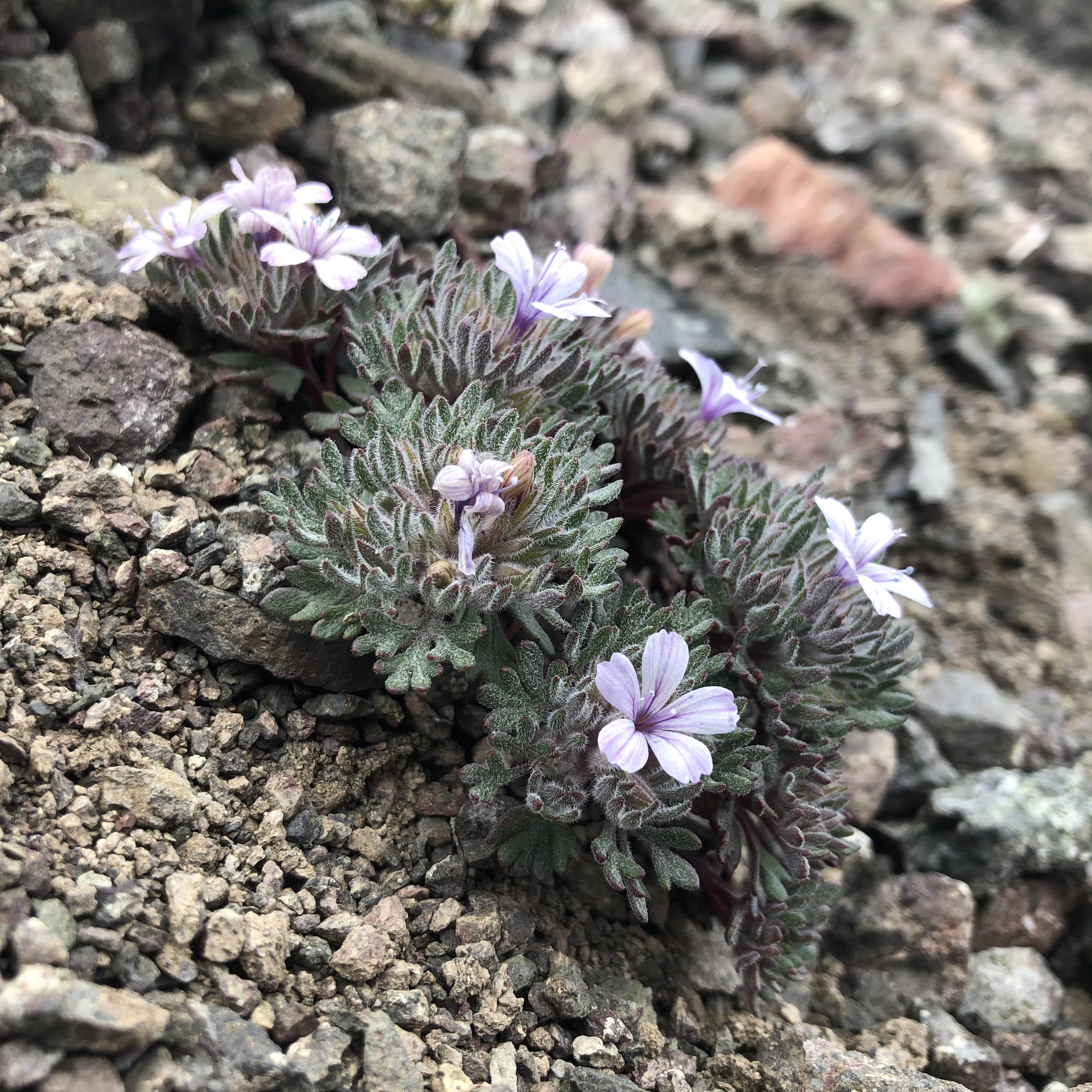

Scientific classification
- Kingdom: Plantae
- Clade: Tracheophytes
- Clade: Angiosperms
- Clade: Eudicots
- Clade: Asterids
- Order: Ericales
- Family: Polemoniaceae
- Genus: Collomia
- Species: C. larsenii

Binomial name
- Collomia larsenii (A.Gray) Payson

= Collomia larsenii =

Species of flowering plant

Collomia larsenii is a species of flowering plant in the phlox family known by the common name talus collomia. It is native to the Olympic Mountains of Washington and the Cascade Range from Washington to northern California, where it grows in high exposed mountainside talus. It is a perennial herb forming a clump in the volcanic rocks. The branching stem is covered in fleshy, glandular, hairy leaves, each divided into many lobes. The inflorescence is a cluster of 6 to 9 tubular purple flowers, each with a face up to 1.5 centimeters wide.
