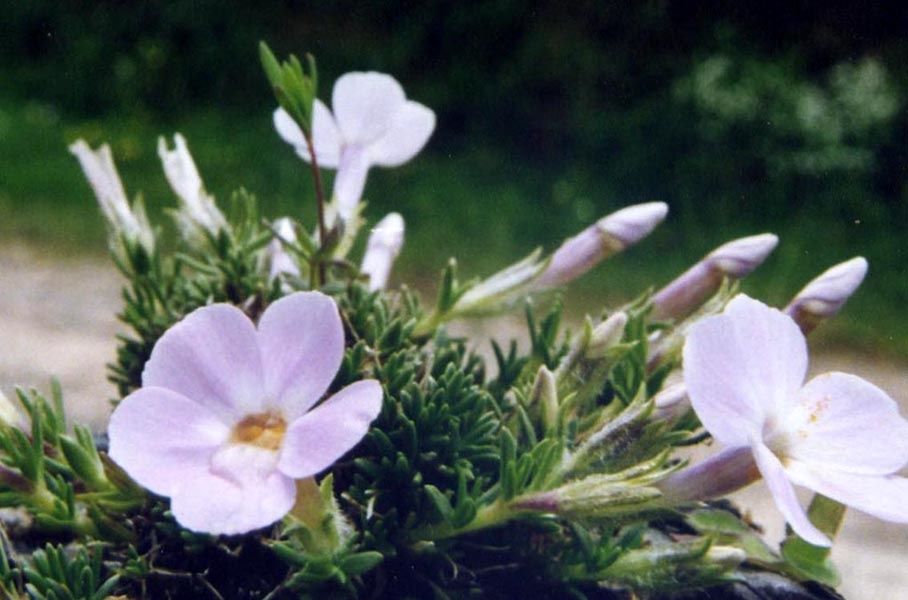

Conservation status
- Apparently Secure (NatureServe)

Scientific classification
- Kingdom: Plantae
- Clade: Tracheophytes
- Clade: Angiosperms
- Clade: Eudicots
- Clade: Asterids
- Order: Ericales
- Family: Polemoniaceae
- Genus: Phlox
- Species: P. caespitosa

Binomial name
- Phlox caespitosa Nutt.

Synonyms
- Phlox piperi

= Phlox caespitosa =

Plant species in the phlox family

Phlox caespitosa is a species of phlox known by the common name tufted phlox. It is native to western North America from British Columbia through the Great Basin to New Mexico, where it grows in scrub, woodland, and other open plateau habitat. It is one of several cushion-forming species that occur in the same region and require careful observation to distinguish. In the past, this species and Phlox douglasii have been erroneously lumped together.

== Description ==
It is a mat-forming perennial herb growing in patches of short, hairy, glandular stems. The stems are lined with pairs of very narrow, sharp-tipped linear leaves each under a centimeter in length. The inflorescence is a solitary flower or cluster of up to three flowers at the tip of each stem. The flower is white or light pink or lavender with five rounded lobes. It is around a centimeter long.

== Taxonomy ==
Phlox caespitosa was given its scientific name by Thomas Nuttall in 1834. It is classified in the Phlox genus as part of the Polemoniaceae family. The species has four synonyms, including one from when it was described as a variety of Phlox douglasii by Herbert Louis Mason in 1925.

Table of Synonyms
Name	Year	Rank	Notes
Phlox caespitosa subsp. eucaespitosa Brand	1907	subspecies	≡ hom., not validly publ.
Phlox caespitosa subvar. piperi (E.E.Nelson) Brand	1907	subvariety	= het.
Phlox douglasii var. caespitosa (Nutt.) H.Mason	1925	variety	≡ hom.
Phlox piperi E.E.Nelson	1899	species	= het.
Notes: ≡ homotypic synonym; = heterotypic synonym
