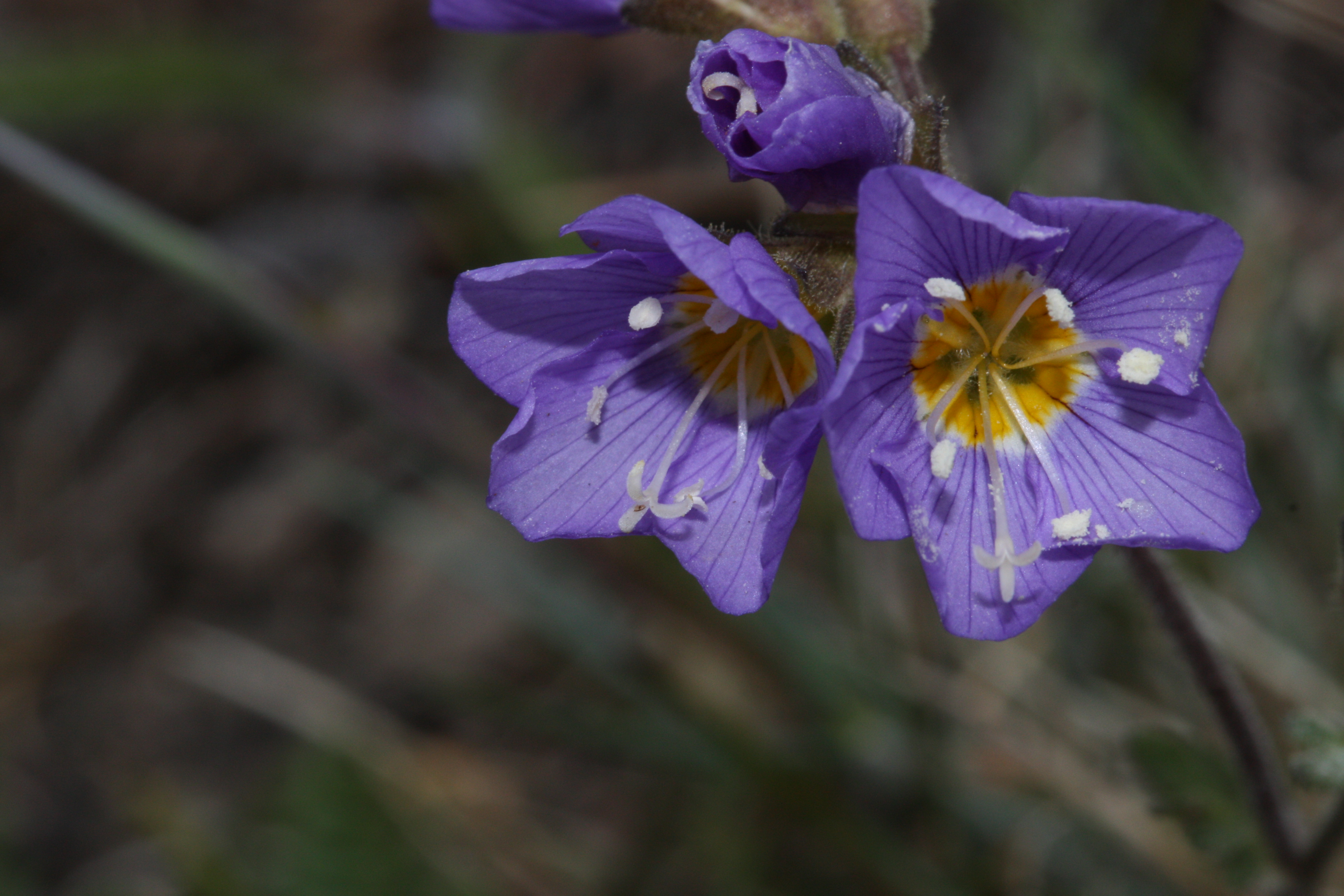

Conservation status
- Least Concern (IUCN 3.1)

- Secure (NatureServe)

Scientific classification
- Kingdom: Plantae
- Clade: Embryophytes
- Clade: Tracheophytes
- Clade: Angiosperms
- Clade: Eudicots
- Clade: Asterids
- Order: Ericales
- Family: Polemoniaceae
- Genus: Polemonium
- Species: P. pulcherrimum

Binomial name
- Polemonium pulcherrimum Hook.

Subspecies and varieties
- P. p. var. delicatum; P. p. subsp. lindleyi; P. p. subsp. pulcherrimum; P. p. var. shastense

Synonyms
- List: Polemonium berryi Eastw.; Polemonium caeruleum var. pulcherrimum (Hook.) Hook.; Polemonium delicatum Rydb.; Polemonium delicatum f. coryphocola (Clem. ex Brand) Wherry; Polemonium delicatum subsp. scopulinum (Greene ex Rydb.) Wherry; Polemonium delicatum subsp. typicum Wherry; Polemonium fasciculatum Eastw.; Polemonium haydenii A.Heller; Polemonium haydenii f. orbiculare (Gand.) Wherry; Polemonium humile f. pulcherrimum (Hook.) Voss; Polemonium lindleyi Wherry; Polemonium montrosense A.Nelson; Polemonium orbiculare Gand.; Polemonium parviflorum Tolm.; Polemonium parvifolium Nutt. ex Rydb.; Polemonium pilosum (Greenm.) G.N.Jones; Polemonium pulcherrimum var. berryi (Eastw.) Brand; Polemonium pulcherrimum f. candidum B.Boivin; Polemonium pulcherrimum subsp. delicatum (Rydb.) Brand; Polemonium pulcherrimum var. haydenii (A.Heller) Brand; Polemonium pulcherrimum var. lindleyi (Wherry) J.P.Anderson; Polemonium pulcherrimum f. montrosense (A.Nelson) Wherry; Polemonium pulcherrimum subsp. parvifolium (Nutt. ex Rydb.) Brand; Polemonium pulcherrimum var. parvifolium (Nutt. ex Rydb.) A.Nelson; Polemonium pulcherrimum f. parvifolium (Nutt. ex Rydb.) Wherry; Polemonium pulcherrimum var. pilosum (Greenm.) Brand; Polemonium pulcherrimum subvar. shastense (Eastw.) Brand; Polemonium pulcherrimum f. tevisii (Eastw.) Brand; Polemonium rotatum Eastw.; Polemonium rotatum var. fasciculatum (Eastw.) Brand; Polemonium scopulinum Greene ex Rydb.; Polemonium shastense Eastw.; Polemonium shastense f. pilosum (Greenm.) Wherry; Polemonium tevisii Eastw.; Polemonium viscosum subsp. pilosum (Greenm.) Piper & Beattie; Polemonium viscosum var. pilosum Greenm.

= Polemonium pulcherrimum =

Plant species in the phlox family

Polemonium pulcherrimum is a species of flowering plant in the phlox family known by several common names, including beautiful Jacob's-ladder, showy Jacob's-ladder, and skunk-leaved polemonium. It is native to western North America from Alaska and Yukon to Arizona and New Mexico, where it can be found in many types of mountain habitat, including alpine talus and rock cracks at high elevations. It is a common and widespread wildflower in several regions. It is a perennial herb producing a clump of several erect stem approaching a maximum height of 30 centimeters. The leaves are mostly basal, with smaller ones arranged along the stem. The leaves are made up of several pairs of lance-shaped to oval or round leaflets. The herbage is lightly hairy, densely glandular, sticky, and strongly scented, the odor reminiscent of skunk. The showy inflorescence is a dense elongated or headlike cluster of bell-shaped flowers each just under a centimeter wide. The flower is deep to bright or pale blue to nearly white with a yellow throat.

== Taxonomy ==
Polemonium pulcherrimum was scientifically described and named by William Jackson Hooker in 1830. However, Hooker revised his own classification in 1837, describing it as a variety of Polemonium caeruleum. Similarly, Andreas Voss classified it as a form of Polemonium humile in 1894, but it is an accepted species according to Plants of the World Online. It is classified in the genus Polemonium as part of the Polemoniaceae family. It has two accepted subspecies and two accepted varieties.

- Polemonium pulcherrimum var. delicatum – Native to Nevada, Arizona, Utah, New Mexico, Colorado, and Wyoming
- Polemonium pulcherrimum subsp. lindleyi – From Alaska to Idaho
- Polemonium pulcherrimum subsp. pulcherrimum – Northwestern North America and eastern Siberia
- Polemonium pulcherrimum var. shastense – Endemic to California

Polemonium pulcherrimum has 36 synonyms of the species or its four subdivisions, including 14 species names.

Table of Synonyms
Name	Year	Synonym of:	Notes
Polemonium berryi Eastw.	1904	subsp. pulcherrimum	= het.
Polemonium delicatum Rydb.	1901	var. delicatum	≡ hom.
Polemonium fasciculatum Eastw.	1904	subsp. lindleyi	= het.
Polemonium haydenii A.Heller	1899	subsp. pulcherrimum	= het.
Polemonium lindleyi Wherry	1942	subsp. lindleyi	≡ hom.
Polemonium montrosense A.Nelson	1905	subsp. pulcherrimum	= het.
Polemonium orbiculare Gand.	1918	subsp. pulcherrimum	= het.
Polemonium parviflorum Tolm.	1923	subsp. pulcherrimum	= het.
Polemonium parvifolium Nutt. ex Rydb.	1897	subsp. pulcherrimum	= het.
Polemonium pilosum (Greenm.) G.N.Jones	1936	subsp. pulcherrimum	= het.
Polemonium rotatum Eastw.	1904	subsp. pulcherrimum	= het.
Polemonium scopulinum Greene ex Rydb.	1906	var. delicatum	= het.
Polemonium shastense Eastw.	1905	var. shastense	≡ hom.
Polemonium tevisii Eastw.	1904	subsp. pulcherrimum	= het.
Notes: ≡ homotypic synonym; = heterotypic synonym

=== Names ===
The species name, pulcherrimum, means "beautiful" in Botanical Latin. It is similarly known by the common name showy polemonium, showy Jacob's-ladder, and pretty Jacob's ladder. It is also simply called Jacob's ladder, due to the oppositely attached leaflets suggesting the shape of a ladder.

== Range ==
Showy polemonium is native to the far eastern parts of Asia and to northwestern North America. In Asia it grows in Yakutiya (the Sakha Republic), Khabarovsk Krai, and Magadan Oblast in eastern Russia. In North America it is native to Alaska, the Yukon, and Northwest Territories in the far north. Further south in Canada it is found in British Columbia and Alberta. In the western United States it grows in both the southwest and northwest from the Pacific states to as far east as New Mexico and Montana.
