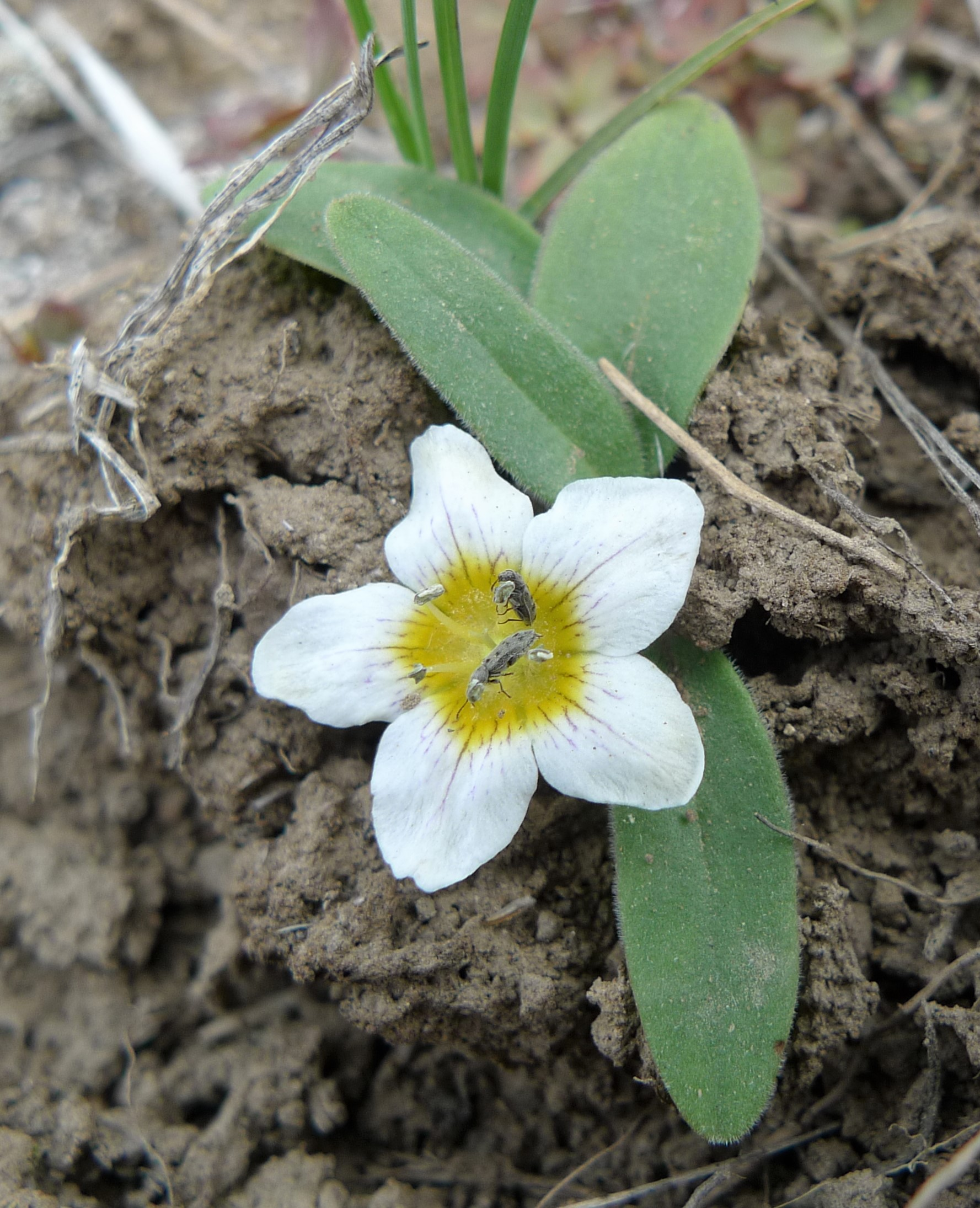

Scientific classification
- Kingdom: Plantae
- Clade: Tracheophytes
- Clade: Angiosperms
- Clade: Eudicots
- Clade: Asterids
- Order: Boraginales
- Family: Hydrophyllaceae
- Genus: Hesperochiron
- Species: H. pumilus

Binomial name
- Hesperochiron pumilus (Griseb.) Porter

Synonyms
- List: Capnorea campanulata Greene; Capnorea ciliata Greene; Capnorea fulcrata Greene; Capnorea hirtella Greene; Capnorea nervosa Greene; Capnorea pumila (Griseb.) Greene; Capnorea villosula Greene; Hesperochiron campanulatus (Greene) Brand; Hesperochiron ciliatus Greene; Hesperochiron pumilus var. ciliatus (Greene) Brand; Hesperochiron pumilus var. genuinus Brand; Hesperochiron pumilus var. vestitus Brand; Hesperochiron villosulus (Greene) Suksd.; Villarsia pumila Griseb.

= Hesperochiron pumilus =

Species of plant

Hesperochiron pumilus, synonym Hesperochiron campanulatus, is a species of flowering plant, native from southeast British Columbia to the western United States. The genus Hesperochiron is placed in the family Hydrophyllaceae. The species was first described by August Grisebach in 1837.
