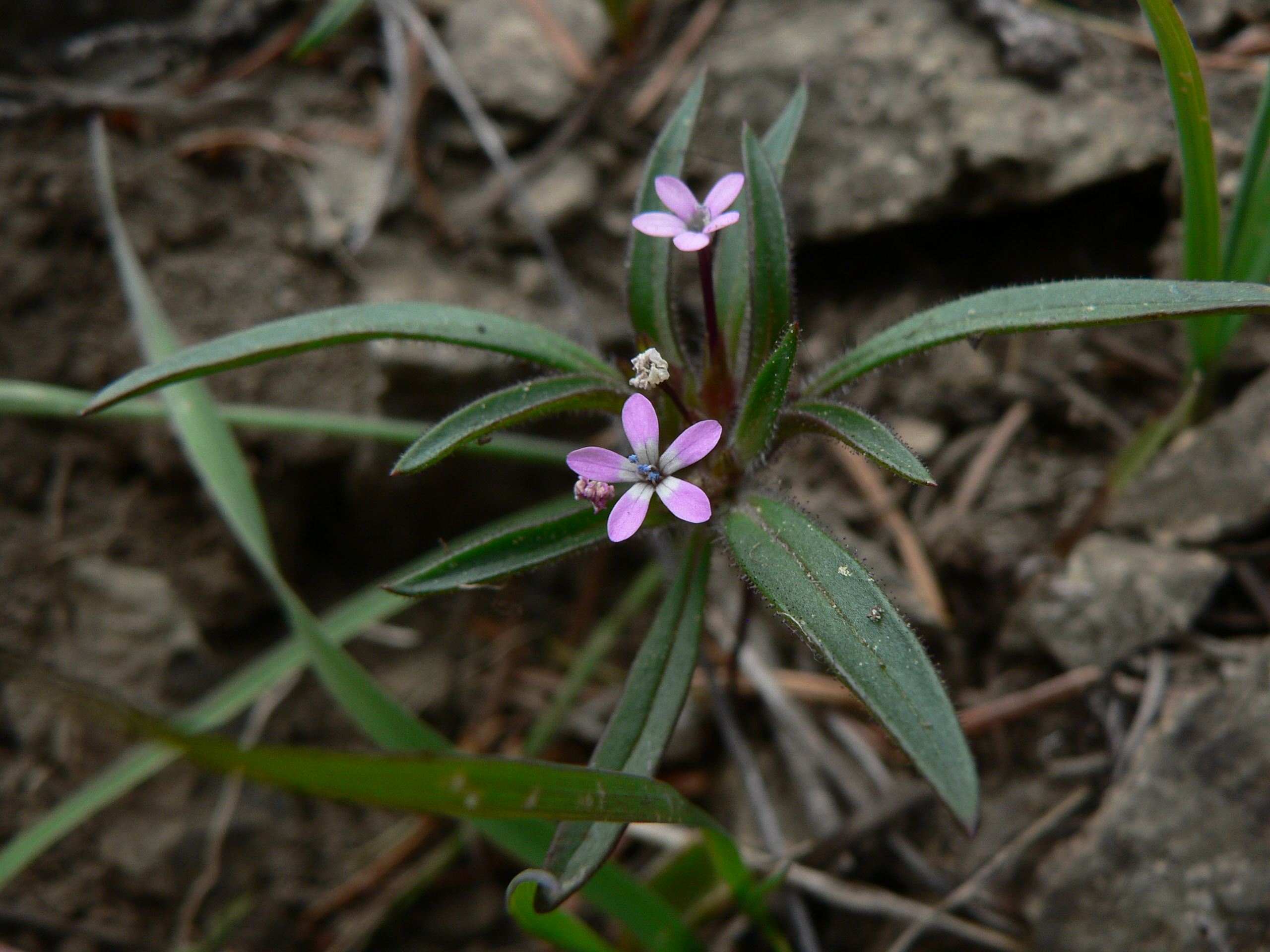

Scientific classification
- Kingdom: Plantae
- Clade: Tracheophytes
- Clade: Angiosperms
- Clade: Eudicots
- Clade: Asterids
- Order: Ericales
- Family: Polemoniaceae
- Genus: Collomia
- Species: C. tinctoria

Binomial name
- Collomia tinctoria Kellogg

= Collomia tinctoria =

Species of flowering plant

Collomia tinctoria is a species of flowering plant in the phlox family known by the common name staining collomia. It is native to the western United States from Washington to Montana to California, where it grows in open, rocky habitat in mountains. It is an annual herb producing a slender, branched stem no taller than about 8 centimeters. The glandular, hairy leaves are lance-shaped. The inflorescence is composed of two or three flowers emerging from the leaf axils. Each flower has pointed sepals tipped with awns. The flower has a purplish tube and a pinkish corolla.
