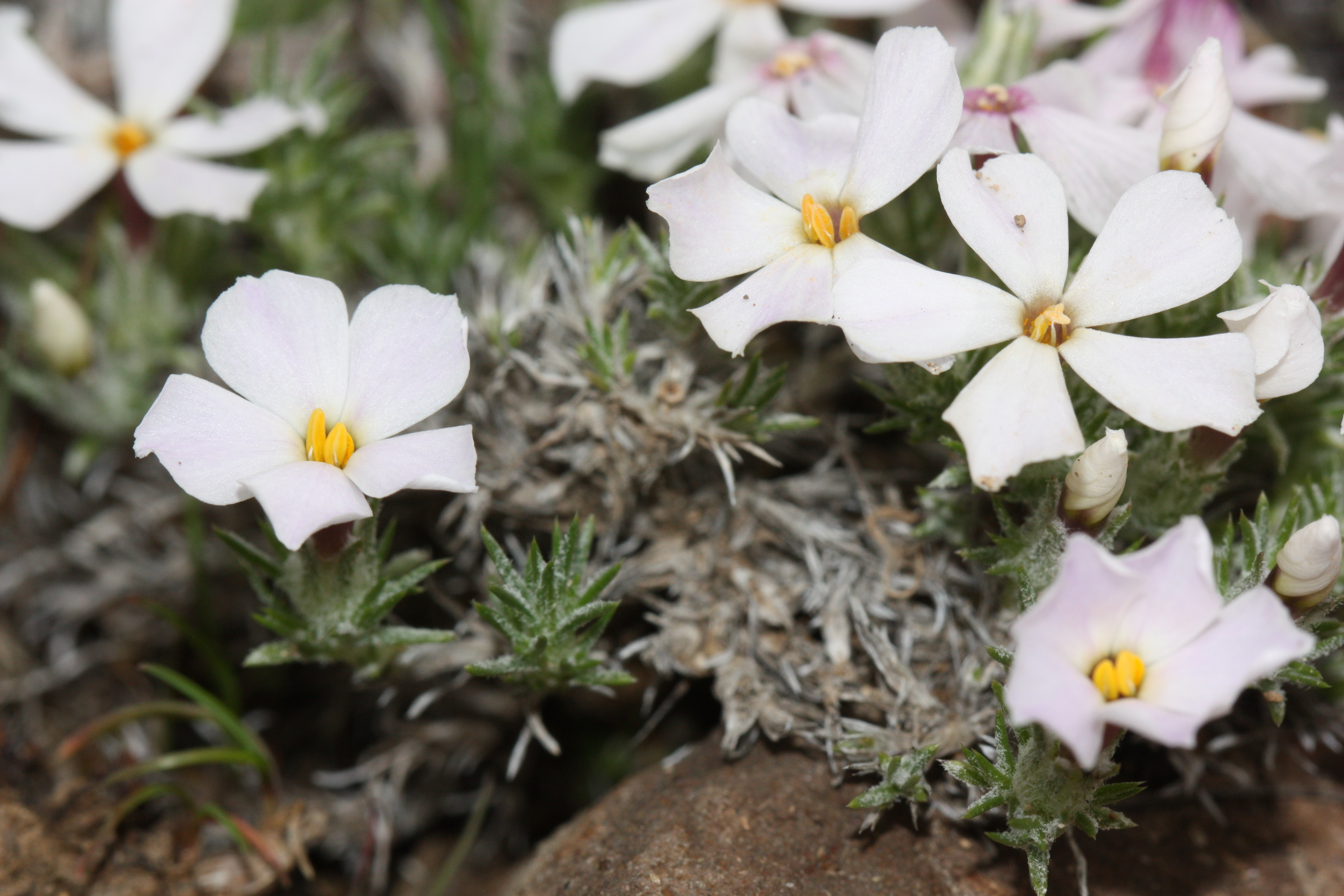

Conservation status
- Secure (NatureServe)

Scientific classification
- Kingdom: Plantae
- Clade: Embryophytes
- Clade: Tracheophytes
- Clade: Spermatophytes
- Clade: Angiosperms
- Clade: Eudicots
- Clade: Asterids
- Order: Ericales
- Family: Polemoniaceae
- Genus: Phlox
- Species: P. hoodii

Binomial name
- Phlox hoodii Richardson

Synonyms
- Armeria hoodii; Fonna hoodii; Phlox hoodii subsp. genuina

= Phlox hoodii =

Plant species in the phlox family

Phlox hoodii, the spiny phlox or carpet phlox, is a species of phlox. It is a plant of western North America, where it is a common flower in sagebrush country, mostly growing in dry lithosol habitats. It is among the first plants to bloom in spring, after the snow has melted. Its distribution extends from Alaska to Arizona. There are many subspecies.

This perennial herb is variable in morphology, but usually forms a tight mat or loose clump on the ground. The short stems emerge from a woody taproot and caudex unit and the plant form is no more than 13 centimetres (5 in) tall. The abundant tiny, sharp-pointed leaves are oppositely arranged and barely exceed one centimetre (1/3 in) long. The herbage is hairy in texture, the hairs short to long, woolly to cobwebby. The appearance of the plant is almost mosslike until blooming. The inflorescence is a solitary flower in shades of white, pink, or blue. It has a tubular throat about one centimetre (1/3 in) long spreading into a flat five-lobed corolla.

== Taxonomy ==
In 1823 John Richardson scientifically described a new species in the Phlox genus with the name Phlox hoodii. Together with its genus it is classified in the Polemoniaceae family and the species has six accepted subspecies and one variety according to Plants of the World Online.

- Phlox hoodii subsp. canescens – Native from British Columbia to New Mexico
- Phlox hoodii subsp. glabrata – Native to Idaho, Montana, Nebraska, North Dakota, South Dakota, and Wyoming
- Phlox hoodii subsp. hoodii – Native to Alaska and the Yukon and from southern Canada to Arizona
- Phlox hoodii subsp. lanata – Native from Washington to Arizona
- Phlox hoodii var. madsenii – Native to Utah
- Phlox hoodii subsp. muscoides – Native from California to North Dakota
- Phlox hoodii subsp. viscidula – Native to Alberta, British Columbia, Idaho, Montana, Oregon, Washington, and Wyoming

Phlox hoodii has 14 synonyms of the species or of four of its subspecies.

Table of Synonyms
Name	Year	Rank	Synonym of:	Notes
Armeria bryoides (Nutt.) Kuntze	1891	species	subsp. muscoides	= het.
Armeria hoodii (Richardson) Kuntze	1891	species	P. hoodii	≡ hom.
Armeria muscodes (Nutt.) Kuntze	1891	species	subsp. muscoides	≡ hom.
Fonna hoodii (Richardson) Nieuwl. & Lunell	1916	species	P. hoodii	≡ hom.
Phlox bryoides Nutt.	1848	species	subsp. muscoides	= het.
Phlox canescens Torr. & A.Gray	1854	species	subsp. canescens	≡ hom.
Phlox canescens var. spinosa Brand	1907	variety	subsp. canescens	= het.
Phlox douglasii var. canescens (Torr. & A.Gray) H.Mason	1925	variety	subsp. canescens	≡ hom.
Phlox glabrata (E.E.Nelson) Brand	1907	species	subsp. glabrata	≡ hom.
Phlox hoodii var. canescens (Torr. & A.Gray) M.Peck	1941	variety	subsp. canescens	≡ hom.
Phlox hoodii subsp. genuina Wherry	1941	subspecies	P. hoodii	≡ hom., not validly publ.
Phlox hoodii var. glabrata E.E.Nelson	1899	variety	subsp. glabrata	≡ hom.
Phlox lanata Piper	1902	species	subsp. lanata	≡ hom.
Phlox muscoides Nutt.	1834	species	subsp. muscoides	≡ hom.
Notes: ≡ homotypic synonym; = heterotypic synonym
