= List of plants on the Modoc National Forest =

This list includes most of the more common plants to be found on the Modoc National Forest in California, USA as well as plants of some particular note, especially rare plants known or suspected to occur there. If you click on the genus, you will be taken to the page for the genus only; you must click on the specific epithet to be taken to the page for that particular species.

== Bryophytes ==
=== Liverworts ===
- Ptilidium californicum

=== Mosses ===
- Bruchia bolanderi
- Buxbaumia viridis
- Helodium blandowii
- Meesia triquetra
- Meesia uliginosa

== Ferns ==
=== Dennstaedtiaceae ===
- Pteridium aquilinum

=== Dryopteridaceae ===
- Athyrium filix-femina
- Polystichum

=== Equisetaceae ===
- Equisetum arvense
- Equisetum hyemale

=== Marsileaceae ===
- Marsilea
- Pilularia

=== Ophioglossaceae ===
- Botrychium pumicola

=== Pteridaceae ===
- Cheilanthes
- Pellaea

== Conifers ==
=== Cupressaceae ===
- Calocedrus decurrens
- Cupressus bakeri - Modoc Cypress or Baker Cypress
- Juniperus communis
- Juniperus occidentalis

=== Pinaceae ===
- Abies concolor
- Abies magnifica
- Pinus albicaulis
- Pinus attenuata
- Pinus contorta
- Pinus jeffreyi
- Pinus lambertiana
- Pinus monticola
- Pinus ponderosa
- Pseudotsuga menziesii
- Tsuga mertensiana

== Dicots ==
=== Amaranthaceae ===
- Amaranthus californicus

=== Apiaceae ===
- Berula
- Cicuta douglasii
- Conium maculatum
- Eryngium
- Heracleum maximum
- Ligusticum
- Lomatium bicolor
- Lomatium dissectum
- Lomatium macrocarpum
- Lomatium nudicaule
- Lomatium roseanum
- Lomatium utriculatum
- Osmorhiza
- Sanicula

=== Apocynaceae ===
- Apocynum androsaemifolium
- Apocynum cannabinum

=== Asclepiadaceae ===
- Asclepias

=== Asteraceae ===
- Achillea millefolium
- Ageratina
- Antennaria
- Arnica
- Artemisia douglasiana
- Artemisia tridentata
- Bidens tripartita
- Carduus nutans
- Centaurea diffusa
- Centaurea maculosa
- Centaurea solstitialis
- Chrysothamnus
- Cirsium arvense
- Cirsium occidentale
- Cirsium vulgare
- Crepis
- Ericameria
- Erigeron acris
- Eriophyllum lanatum
- Eurybia
- Euthamia
- Gnaphalium
- Grindelia
- Helianthus annuus
- Hieracium albiflorum
- Hymenoxys
- Ionactis
- Iva
- Lactuca serriola
- Leucanthemum vulgare
- Madia
- Microseris nutans
- Onopordum acanthium
- Packera
- Senecio
- Solidago canadensis
- Sonchus
- Stephanomeria
- Symphyotrichum
- Taraxacum officinale
- Tragopogon dubius
- Tragopogon porrifolius
- Xanthium strumarium

=== Berberidaceae ===
- Mahonia aquifolium
- Mahonia nervosa
- Mahonia repens

=== Boraginaceae ===
- Amsinckia
- Asperugo procumbens
- Cryptantha
- Hackelia
- Heliotropium
- Lithospermum
- Mertensia

=== Brassicaceae ===
- Alyssum
- Arabis
- Barbarea
- Brassica rapa
- Cardamine
- Draba verna
- Erysimum
- Isatis tinctoria
- Lepidium campestre
- Lepidium virginicum
- Nasturtium officinale
- Phoenicaulis cheiranthoides
- Polyctenium fremontii
- Streptanthus
- Thelypodium howellii

=== Callitrichaceae ===
- Callitriche

=== Campanulaceae ===
- Campanula
- Downingia

=== Capparaceae ===
- Cleome

=== Caprifoliaceae ===
- Lonicera involucrata
- Sambucus nigra
- Symphoricarpos

=== Caryophyllaceae ===
- Arenaria
- Cerastium
- Holosteum
- Minuartia
- Silene
- Spergularia rubra
- Stellaria media

=== Chenopodiaceae ===
- Chenopodium
- Salsola tragus

=== Clusiaceae ===
- Hypericum perforatum

=== Convolvulaceae ===
- Calystegia
- Convolvulus arvensis

=== Cornaceae ===
- Cornus sericea

=== Crassulaceae ===
- Rhodiola
- Sedum

=== Cuscutaceae ===
- Cuscuta

=== Droseraceae ===
- Drosera anglica
- Drosera rotundifolia

=== Ericaceae ===
- Arctostaphylos
- Kalmia microphylla
- Ledum
- Vaccinium

=== Euphorbiaceae ===
- Chamaesyce
- Croton setigerus
- Euphorbia

=== Fabaceae ===
- Astragalus anxius — endemic & Critically Endangered
- Astragalus inversus — endemic
- Astragalus lemmonii
- Lathyrus species
- Lotus corniculatus
- Lupinus latifolius var. barbatus
- Lupinus polyphyllus
- Medicago sativa
- Melilotus officinalis
- Robinia pseudoacacia
- Thermopsis species
- Trifolium pratense
- Trifolium repens
- Trifolium wormskioldii
- Vicia species

=== Fagaceae ===
- Chrysolepis
- Quercus kelloggii

=== Fumariaceae ===
- Dicentra

=== Garryaceae ===
- Garrya

=== Gentianaceae ===
- Centaurium
- Gentiana

=== Geraniaceae ===
- Erodium cicutarium
- Geranium viscosissimum

=== Grossulariaceae ===
- Ribes

=== Hippuridaceae ===
- Hippuris vulgaris

=== Hydrophyllaceae ===
- Hydrophyllum
- Nama
- Nemophila
- Phacelia

=== Lamiaceae ===
- Agastache
- Lycopus
- Marrubium vulgare
- Mentha arvensis
- Monardella odoratissima
- Prunella
- Salvia
- Scutellaria
- Stachys ajugoides
- Trichostema lanceolatum

=== Lentibulariaceae ===
- Utricularia vulgaris

=== Linaceae ===
- Linum lewisii

=== Loasaceae ===
- Mentzelia

=== Lythraceae ===
- Lythrum

=== Malvaceae ===
- Iliamna
- Sidalcea

=== Menyanthaceae ===
- Menyanthes trifoliata

=== Monotropaceae ===
- Allotropa virgata
- Monotropa hypopithys
- Pterospora andromedea

=== Oleaceae ===
- Fraxinus latifolia

=== Onagraceae ===
- Camissonia
- Chamerion angustifolium
- Circaea
- Clarkia
- Epilobium minutum

=== Orobanchaceae ===
- Orobanche

=== Paeoniaceae ===
- Paeonia brownii

=== Papaveraceae ===
- Eschscholzia californica

=== Polemoniaceae ===
- Collomia
- Gilia
- Ipomopsis aggregata
- Linanthus
- Phlox stansburyi
- Phlox hoodii var. canescens
- Polemonium

=== Polygonaceae ===
- Eriogonum nudum
- Oxyria digyna
- Polygonum arenastrum
- Rumex acetosella
- Rumex aquaticus
- Rumex crispus

=== Portulacaceae ===
- Calandrinia
- Claytonia perfoliata
- Lewisia rediviva

=== Primulaceae ===
- Dodecatheon

=== Pyrolaceae ===
- Chimaphila umbellata
- Pyrola asarifolia

=== Ranunculaceae ===
- Aconitum
- Actaea rubra
- Adonis aestivalis
- Anemone
- Aquilegia formosa
- Caltha
- Delphinium
- Enemion stipitatum
- Myosurus
- Pulsatilla
- Ranunculus aquatilis
- Ranunculus glaberrimus
- Ranunculus testiculatus
- Thalictrum

=== Rhamnaceae ===
- Ceanothus
- Frangula
- Rhamnus

=== Rosaceae ===
- Amelanchier alnifolia
- Cercocarpus ledifolius
- Chamaebatiaria millefolium
- Comarum palustre
- Crataegus
- Fragaria virginiana
- Geum aleppicum
- Geum macrophyllum
- Holodiscus discolor
- Malus pumila
- Peraphyllum ramosissimum
- Potentilla fruticosa
- Prunus emarginata
- Prunus subcordata
- Prunus virginiana
- Purshia tridentata
- Rosa
- Rubus leucodermis
- Sanguisorba
- Sorbus
- Spiraea douglasii

=== Rubiaceae ===
- Galium aparine
- Galium triflorum

=== Salicaceae ===
- Populus alba
- Populus tremuloides
- Salix alba

=== Saxifragaceae ===
- Heuchera
- Parnassia
- Saxifraga

=== Scrophulariaceae ===
- Castilleja
- Collinsia
- Cordylanthus capitatus
- Linaria
- Mimulus guttatus
- Pedicularis
- Penstemon
- Scrophularia
- Verbascum thapsus
- Veronica americana

=== Solanaceae ===
- Nicotiana
- Solanum physalifolium

=== Urticaceae ===
- Urtica dioica

=== Valerianaceae ===
- Valeriana

=== Violaceae ===
- Viola beckwithii

=== Viscaceae ===
- Arceuthobium

=== Zygophyllaceae ===
- Tribulus terrestris

== Monocots ==
=== Asparagaceae ===
- Camassia quamash

=== Alliaceae ===
- Allium validum

=== Alismataceae ===
- Damasonium
- Sagittaria

=== Cyperaceae ===
- Carex
- Eleocharis bella
- Eriophorum
- Schoenoplectus acutus
- Scirpus

=== Iridaceae ===
- Iris
- Olsynium douglasii

=== Juncaceae ===
- Juncus tenuis
- Luzula

=== Liliaceae ===
- Calochortus
- Fritillaria pudica
- Lilium pardalinum

=== Melanthiaceae ===
- Toxicoscordion venenosum
- Veratrum

=== Orchidaceae ===
- Cephalanthera
- Corallorhiza maculata
- Cypripedium montanum
- Goodyera
- Piperia
- Platanthera
- Spiranthes

=== Poaceae ===
- Achnatherum
- Agropyron desertorum
- Agrostis stolonifera
- Alopecurus pratensis
- Arrhenatherum elatius
- Beckmannia
- Briza
- Briza maxima
- Bromus tectorum
- Calamagrostis
- Cinna
- Crypsis
- Dactylis glomerata
- Danthonia
- Deschampsia
- Distichlis spicata
- Echinochloa crus-galli
- Elymus repens
- Festuca
- Glyceria
- Hesperostipa
- Hordeum jubatum
- Koeleria
- Leymus
- Melica
- Muhlenbergia
- Orcuttia tenuis
- Phalaris arundinacea
- Phleum pratense
- Poa palustris
- Poa pratensis
- Taeniatherum caput-medusae
- Trisetum
- Vulpia

=== Potamogetonaceae ===
- Potamogeton

=== Ruscaceae ===
- Maianthemum racemosum

=== Sparganiaceae ===
- Sparganium

=== Themidaceae ===
- Brodiaea
- Dichelostemma
- Triteleia

=== Typhaceae ===
- Typha latifolia

== See also ==
- Modoc National Forest topics
- Modoc Plateau topics — with flora articles.
