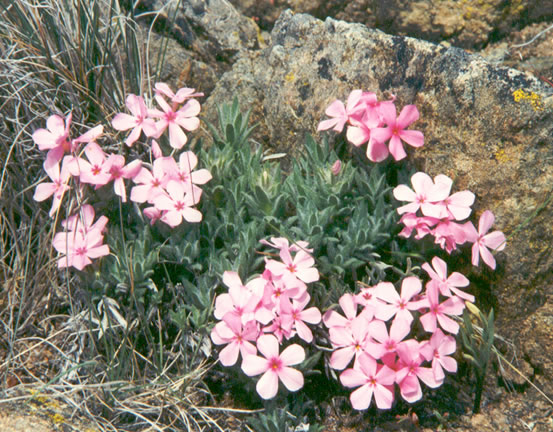

Conservation status
- Endangered (ESA)

Scientific classification
- Kingdom: Plantae
- Clade: Tracheophytes
- Clade: Angiosperms
- Clade: Eudicots
- Clade: Asterids
- Order: Ericales
- Family: Polemoniaceae
- Genus: Phlox
- Species: P. hirsuta

Binomial name
- Phlox hirsuta E.E. Nelson

= Phlox hirsuta =

Species of flowering plant

Phlox hirsuta, the Yreka phlox or hairy phlox, is a species of phlox. It is a small flowering plant that grows in the serpentine soils of Siskiyou County, California and is the official city flower of Yreka, California, after which it is named.

== Description ==
Yreka phlox plants grow to a height of up to six inches, with thick hairy stems at the base (the specific epithet hirsuta means hairy). In April through June they become covered by small pink or purple flowers.

== Related species ==
Yreka phlox often grows near another more common species of phlox, Phlox speciosa, which it resembles, but the latter species has deep notches in its flower petals that are not present in Yreka phlox. Additionally, unlike Yreka phlox, Phlox speciosa is capable of growing on non-serpentine soils. Some biologists have classified Yreka phlox as a variant of Phlox stansburyi, but its status as a separate species is now recognized by most biologists as well as by the CalFlora and USDA PLANTS databases.

== History ==
The first recorded specimen of Yreka phlox was discovered by Edward Lee Greene in 1876. Greene was the priest at St. Laurence's Episcopal Church in Yreka (since renamed as St. Mark's) from 1876 to 1877, when he made the discovery; he later became the first botanist at the University of California, Berkeley. The discovery was recorded in 1899 by Elias Nelson, who described its location as "rocky hilltops near Yreka, Siskiyou County, California".

In 2009, Yreka phlox was named as the official city flower of Yreka.

== Status ==
Because Yreka phlox is only known to grow in a few locations near Yreka, it is endangered by land use plans that threaten those locations as well as by other factors stemming from the increased urbanization of the Yreka area, such as off-road vehicle use and the encroachment of non-native species. In 1975, the Secretary of the Smithsonian Institution included Phlox hirsuta on a list of endangered plants. It was listed as an endangered species by the state of California in 1986, and by the U.S. Fish and Wildlife Service in 2000. A recovery plan was drafted by the Fish and Wildlife Service in 2006, and was dedicated to the memory of Larry G. Bacon, the city attorney of Yreka from 1970 to 2002, who had been a leader of local efforts to protect the species.
