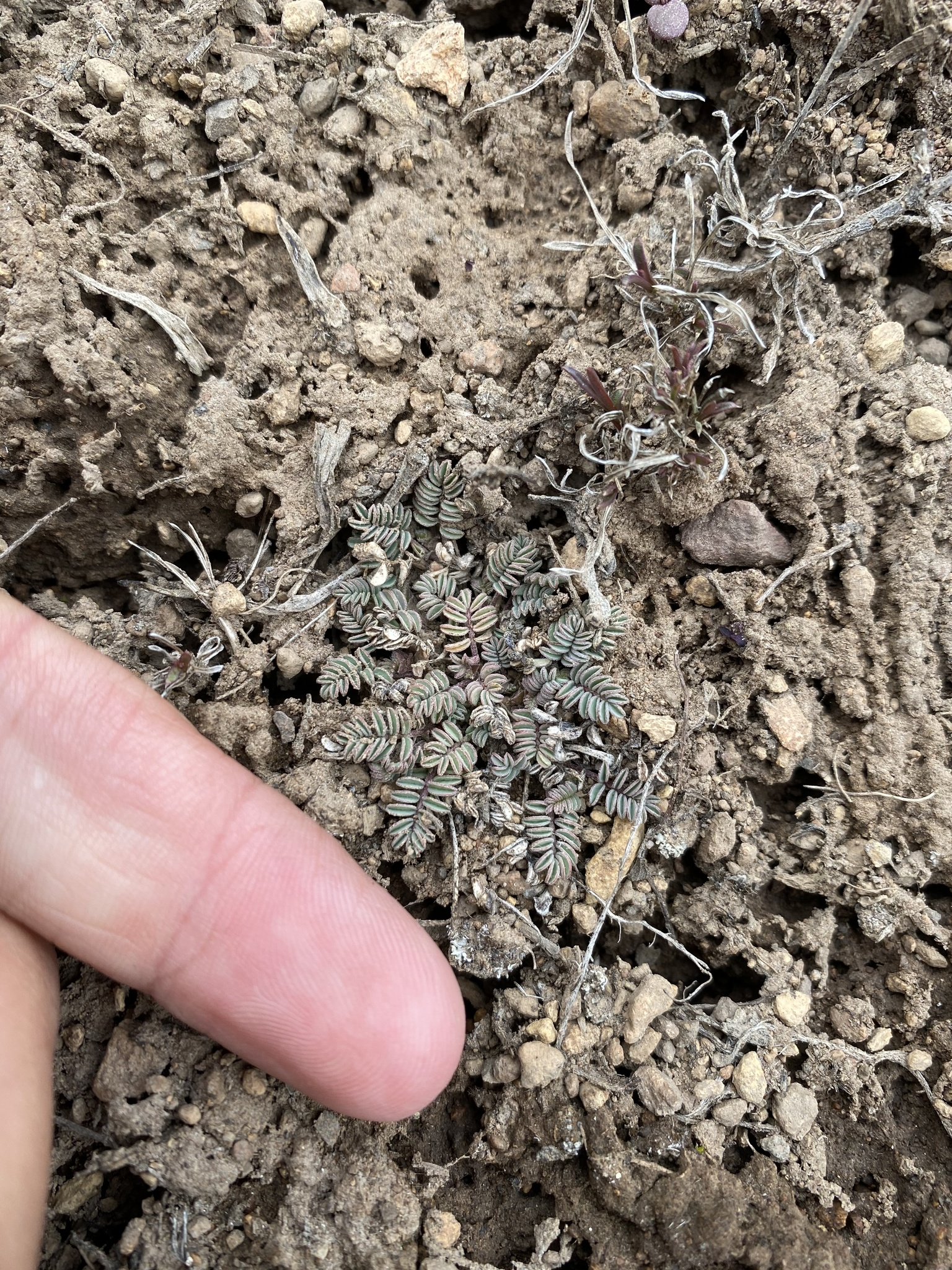
- Var. tegetarioides

Scientific classification
- Kingdom: Plantae
- Clade: Tracheophytes
- Clade: Angiosperms
- Clade: Eudicots
- Clade: Rosids
- Order: Fabales
- Family: Fabaceae
- Subfamily: Faboideae
- Genus: Astragalus
- Species: A. tegetarioides

Binomial name
- Astragalus tegetarioides M.E.Jones

Synonyms
- Homalobus tegetarioides

= Astragalus tegetarioides =

Plant species in the pea family

Astragalus tegetarioides, the bastard milkvetch or bastard kentrophyta, is a species of rare flowering plant in the pea family from California and Oregon.

== Taxonomy ==
Astragalus tegetarioides was scientifically described and named in 1902 by Marcus E. Jones. It is part of the Astragalus genus, which is classified in the Fabaceae family. As of April 2023, Plants of the World Online accepted two varieties:

- Astragalus tegetarioides var. anxius (Meinke & Kaye) S.L.Welsh
- Astragalus tegetarioides var. tegetarioides

However, in a few sources such as the Jepson eFlora variety anxius is treated as a species named Astragalus anxius, in which case A. tegetarioides is native only to Oregon and A. anxius to California.

=== Names ===
Astragalus tegetarioides is known by the common name bastard milkvetch or bastard kentrophyta. Variety tegetarioides is called the Blue Mountain milkvetch.

== Range and habitat ==
The variety tegetarioides grows in Deschutes, County, Oregon|Grant, and Harney counties in eastern Oregon. There it grows in dry habitats of the pine forests and sagebrush steppe. It can be found at elevations of 1,300–1,600 meters (4,300–5,200 ft).

Variety anxius is endemic to the Ash Valley, an area near the headwaters of Ash Creek, in Lassen County, California. It can be found at elevations of 1,500–1,700 meters (4,900–5,600 ft) flat, open, dry areas juniper–sagebrush steppes or Jeffrey pine woodlands.
