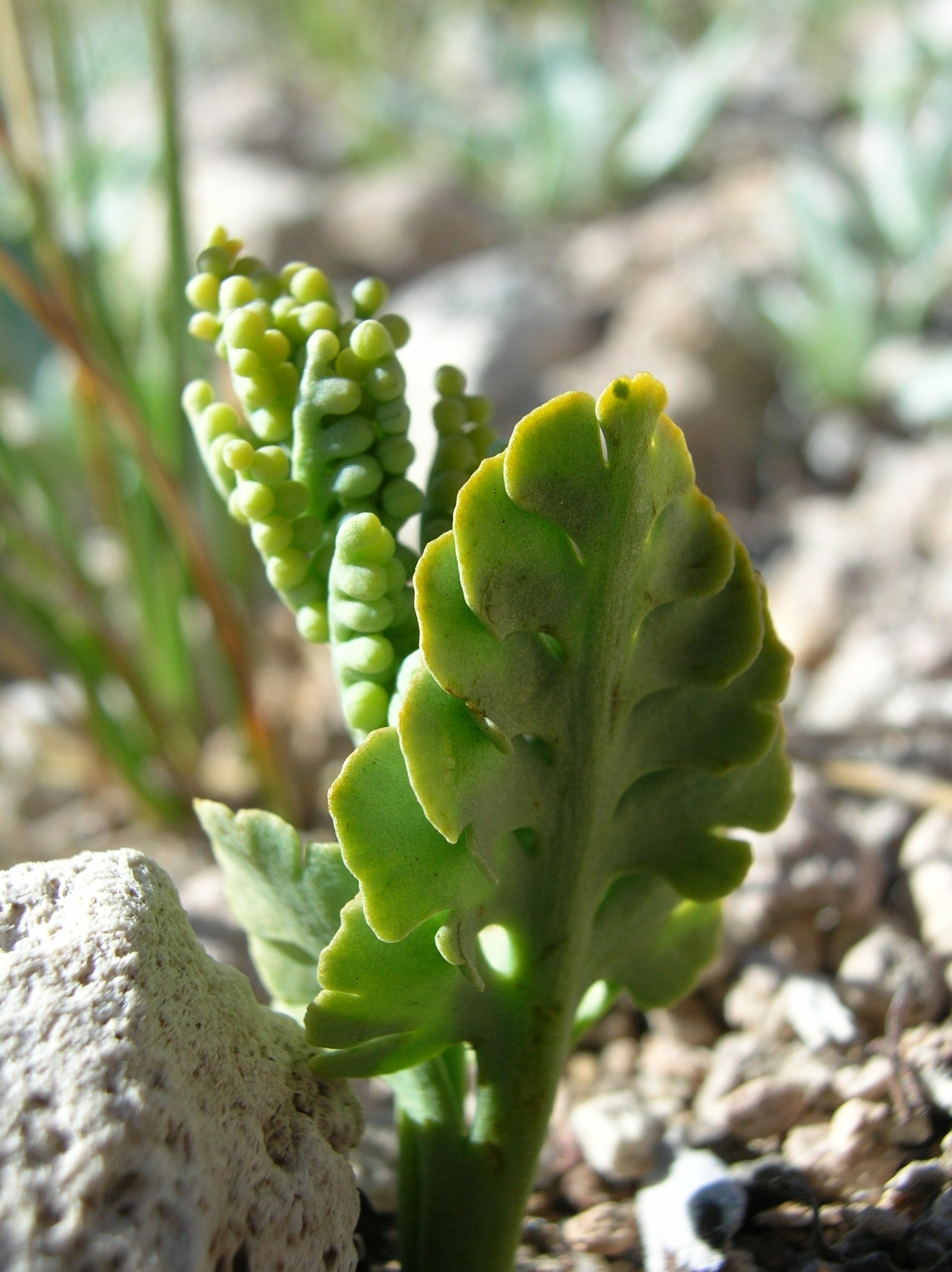

Conservation status
- Vulnerable (NatureServe)

Scientific classification
- Kingdom: Plantae
- Clade: Embryophytes
- Clade: Tracheophytes
- Division: Polypodiophyta
- Class: Polypodiopsida
- Order: Ophioglossales
- Family: Ophioglossaceae
- Genus: Botrychium
- Species: B. pumicola

Binomial name
- Botrychium pumicola Coville ex Underw.

= Botrychium pumicola =

Pumice moonwort

Species of fern

Botrychium pumicola is a rare fern with the common name pumice moonwort.

== Distribution ==
The fern is endemic to the Modoc Plateau in northern California and the Crater Lake area in southern Oregon.

A specimen from a population found on Mount Shasta in California by Cooke in 1941 was thought to have been misidentified, but the specimen was recently reviewed by Farrar and found to be correctly identified. Botrychium pumicola was rediscovered on Mt. Shasta in 2008 by M. Colberg. It is also found in the Modoc National Forest.

=== Habitat ===
As its common name suggests, Pumice moonwort lives in dry, fine to coarse pumice gravel and scree without any admixture of humus, in places that retain moisture into late spring. Its native landscape is open, fully exposed, sparsely vegetated pumice fields and gently rolling slopes, from subalpine lodgepole pine forest to area above timberline. It may also occur in Pinus contorta−Purshia tridentata basins with open frost pockets. During the winter, it is usually covered by several feet of snow. Botrychium pumicola has been found growing with B. lanceolatum and B. simplex. Elevation of occurrence is from 4,240 to 9,065 feet (1,292 to 2,763 m) above sea level.

== Description ==
Botrychium pumicola is a mycorrhizal fern and grows sporophytic gemmae (i.e., little structures for the asexual reproduction of the sporophytic, or diploid, phase of the plant's life cycle). Some botanists believe that the gemmae might be adaptations to a dry climate and fires. Another name for plants of the genus Botrychium is 'grapeferns,' since the sexual reproductive structures (synangia) look like tiny yellow-green grapes.

The plant is stout, with a very congested appearance, fleshy, 8–22 cm (3–9 in) high. Leaves appear in summer. Roots are abundant, 1 mm (0.004 in) or less in diameter. The rhizome is erect, stout, elongate (2–8 cm, 1–3 in, long and 3 mm, 0.1 in, in diameter).

Fronds are one or sometimes two, erect, 6–14 cm, 2-5½ in, long, the common stalk hypogean, 4–9 cm, 1½-3½ in, long and 2-3½ mm, 0.08-0.14 in, in diameter, thickly sheathed with the stems of old fronds. Trophophore is sessile or nearly so; stalk 0–10 mm, 0–0.4 in, a tenth to a half the length of trophophore rachis; blade is dull, strongly glaucous, whitish green, deltate (triangular), thickly leathery, twice pinnate, with apex bent down in vernation, 2–4 cm, 1–1½ in, long and 1½–4 cm, ½–1½ in, broad; ternate, the middle division the largest, broadly oblong to rounded-deltoid, the lateral ones similar or rhombic-oblong, all pinnately parted; pinnae closely imbricate (overlapping), up to 6 pairs, strongly ascending, sublunate to flabelliform, broadly crenate to incised, or the larger ones radially cleft into cuneiform lobes; distance between 1st and 2nd pinnae not or slightly more than between the 2nd and 3rd pairs, asymmetrically cuneate; basal pinna pair often divided into 2 unequal parts, lobed to tip, margins entire, sinuate to shallowly crenate, apex rounded to truncate, venation pinnate.

The trophophore is located high on the common stalk, but the common stalk is subterranean, giving the impression that the leaf originates near ground level. Sporophore is once to thrice pinnate, with a recurved tip in vernation, sessile or short-stalked, equalling or surpassing (1 to 1½ times) the sterile blade, but with a stalk that is shorter than the trophophore; extremely compact sporangial cluster.

== Taxonomy ==
Botrychium pumicola was named by Frederick Vernon Coville, who collected the type specimen with Elmer Ivan Applegate at Crater Lake in 1898. It was first described by Lucien Marcus Underwood in 1900.

It is in the adder's-tongue family (Ophioglossaceae) and may be closely related to the whisk ferns of the family Psilotaceae. Recent research suggests that these two families share a common ancestor which appears to have diverged early on from the rest of the fern lineage; this probably explains the distinctive morphologies of the members of these two families.

There was speculation that Botrychium pumicola is a variety of Botrychium simplex. The two species are indeed closely related, with Botrychium montanum also somewhat closely related. It has been determined that Botrychium pumicola is a separate species.

== Ecology ==
The fire ecology of this plant is not known, but open, sparsely vegetated pumice probably does not carry fire well. Therefore, this plant is neither likely to encounter fire nor tolerate it well.

=== Conservation status and threats ===
- U.S. Forest Service – Pacific Southwest Region, Sensitive Species.
- California Native Plant Society Inventory of Rare and Endangered Plants – 2B.2 (Fairly endangered in California).
- NatureServe Vulnerable species – Oregon State Rank S3; California State Rank S1; Global Rank G3.

Some of the principal threats to this species are fern collecting and habitat disruption caused by recreational use, timber harvesting, and pumice mining.

=== Field identification ===
The best time of year to look for this plant is from July to September. The sessile trophophore and very short-stalked sporophore serve to distinguish this species from B. simplex. Pumice moonwort has a bluish-grey-green color, as opposed to B. lanceolatum, whose color is more yellow-green.

== See also ==
- Ferns of California
- List of plants on the Modoc National Forest
