= Bearded lupine =

Bearded lupine is a common name for several flowering plants and may refer to:

- Lupinus barbiger, native to Utah and Arizona
- Lupinus latifolius var. barbatus, native to California and Oregon
