= South Warner Wilderness =

Protected wilderness area in California, United States

- IUCN category Ib (wilderness area)
- Location within California Location within the United States
- Interactive map of South Warner Wilderness
- Location: Modoc County, California, United States
- Nearest city: Alturas, California
- Coordinates: 41°19′00″N 120°10′34″W
- Area: 70,385 acres (284.84 km^{2})
- Established: 1964
- Governing body: U.S. Forest Service

The South Warner Wilderness is a federally designated wilderness area 12 miles (19 km) east of Alturas, California, United States. It encompasses more than 70,000 acres (283 km^{2}) of the Warner Mountains. It is within the Modoc National Forest and managed by the US Forest Service. Elevations range from 5,000 feet (1,500 m) to 9,895 feet at Eagle Peak.

The highest parts of the Warner Mountains were set aside in 1931 as a primitive area. In 1964, the Wilderness Act created the South Warner Wilderness. In 1984, 1,940 acres (7.9 km^{2}) were added to the wilderness with the passage of the California Wilderness Act.

The Warner crest divides waters that flow west into the Sacramento/Pit River drainage, and east into the Great Basin alkali lakes of Surprise Valley. Much of the crest is a narrow ridgeline with notable peaks such as Emerson Peak and Warren Peak. The eastern side of the wilderness is a steep, abrupt escarpment of volcanic terrain of cliff bands and terraces. Very different from the east side are the western slopes. Heavily forested, steadily rising slopes furrowed by several drainages such as Mill Creek.

The west side also includes a portion of a 6,016-acre (2,435 ha) state game refuge.

== Landscape ==
The Warner Mountain Range is a fault block range, with the Surprise Valley Fault on the east and the Likely Fault to the west. The steep escarpment on the east side of the range is the exposed side of the Surprise Valley fault. Geologists estimate that basalt lava flows occurred 15 to 30 million years ago, creating the Modoc Plateau which is a part of the larger Columbia Plateau. The breaking up of the crust occurred about 10 million years ago with large blocks moving and more volcanic lava flows, which created the mountains and block fault valleys of recent time. The landscape of today is not from mountain building but from the forces of erosion such as wind, water, and past glaciation.

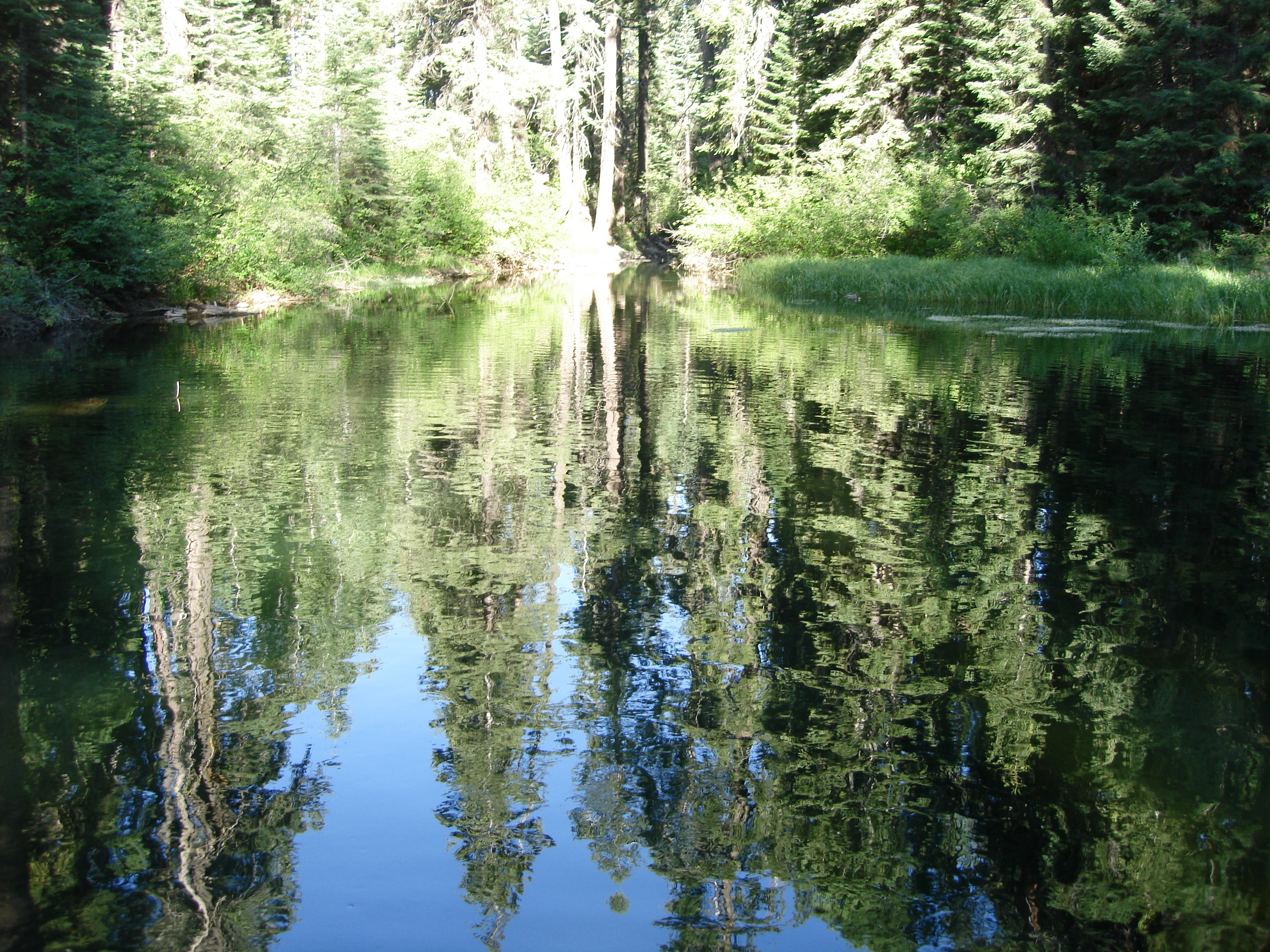
Clear Lake

=== Lakes and waterways ===
There are several lakes in the wilderness: Patterson, Mosquito, South Emerson, North Emerson, Clear Lake, Cottonwood, Cougar, Linderman, and Irons. Patterson Lake is the largest, highest in elevation and most visited. It also has a self-sustaining population of trout. Major streams draining the range are Poison Creek, Mill Creek, Parker Creek, and on the east side, Eagle Creek.

=== Flora and fauna ===
The rich volcanic soils support dense stands of western juniper, ponderosa pine, Jeffrey pine, and white fir trees. At the highest elevations are lodgepole pine, whitebark pine, fields of sagebrush and bitterbrush. Many species of rare plants are protected in the South Warner Wilderness, a few of which are perennial wildflowers such as tufted saxifrage (Saxifraga cespitosa) and High Sierra phlox (Phlox dispersa). Annuals include Cusick's monkeyflower (Mimulus cusickii). A notable rare shrub is the native western black currant (Ribes hudsonianum var. petiolare), which grows in wetland/riparian habitat, blooms from May through July, and has less than five documented occurrences in the state.

Wildlife include Rocky Mountain mule deer, also mountain lions, beaver, bobcat, coyote and martens. Black bears are very rare but present. The wilderness is on the path of the Pacific Flyway.

== Recreation ==
Hiking is the most popular activity, both day hikes and backpacking, with fishing, horseback riding, snowshoeing, and cross-country skiing making up the remainder. Dramatic views from the crest include Mount Shasta in the west, Modoc Plateau to the north, Surprise Valley in the Great Basin in the east and in the south, the Sierra Nevada range.

There are 79.2 miles (127 km) of trails within the wilderness area, plus unmaintained pathways adding another 20 miles (32 km). There are eight trailheads surrounding the wilderness and five campgrounds. Pepperdine Trailhead offers corrals for horses and stock parties.

The Forest Service and many organizations encourage the practice of Leave No Trace principles of outdoor travel to minimize human impact on the environment and wilderness.
