= Rancho de Briesgau =

Mexican land grant in California, US

Rancho de Briesgau was a rancho granted in 1844 to William Benitz (alternatively spelled Bennitz and misspelled Banitz) by Manuel Micheltorena for his service in the Mexican Army. The location was on the east bank of the Sacramento River on the traditional homelands of the Yana people. Benitz was a land manager for John Sutter, and was granted or purchased land along the Sonoma Coast as well, including parts of Rancho German and Rancho Muniz. The location of Rancho de Briesgau now straddles the Tehama and Shasta county line. It was the second most northern Mexican land grant.

Its contemporary name is Rancho Breisgau, and it's also been known as New Breisgau or Breisgan.

The northern boundary was just south of Ash Creek, and its southern boundary was the south tip of Bloody Island, where Battle Creek joins the Sacramento.

Two place names in the area, Bloody Island (marked on the original land grant map as "Isla de Sangre") and the area just to the south currently named Massacre Flats, memorialize the impact of the California Genocide here. During the Mexican-American War, the Gold Rush, and subsequent American settlement, the Sacramento River dwelling Nomlaki and Yana peoples were nearly made extinct. The area is the traditional homelands of the River Nomlaki and Yana (Nozi) peoples.

Benitz never lived on the site.

Rancho Buena Ventura was on the opposite bank of the Sacramento River, on Nomlaki land, with a meeting point with Rancho Breisgau at Bloody Island, home of the Yana.

Gover Ranch is the largest current land owner of the original land grant. Much of the land grant is also now BLM land, and the blue oak woodlands and spring wildflowers that grow in the riparian meadows are California native plants, many of which were also food crops for the Indigenous Californians of the area.
