= Ash Creek State Wildlife Area =

Protected area in California, US

- Ash Creek Wildlife Refuge
- IUCN category V (protected landscape/seascape)
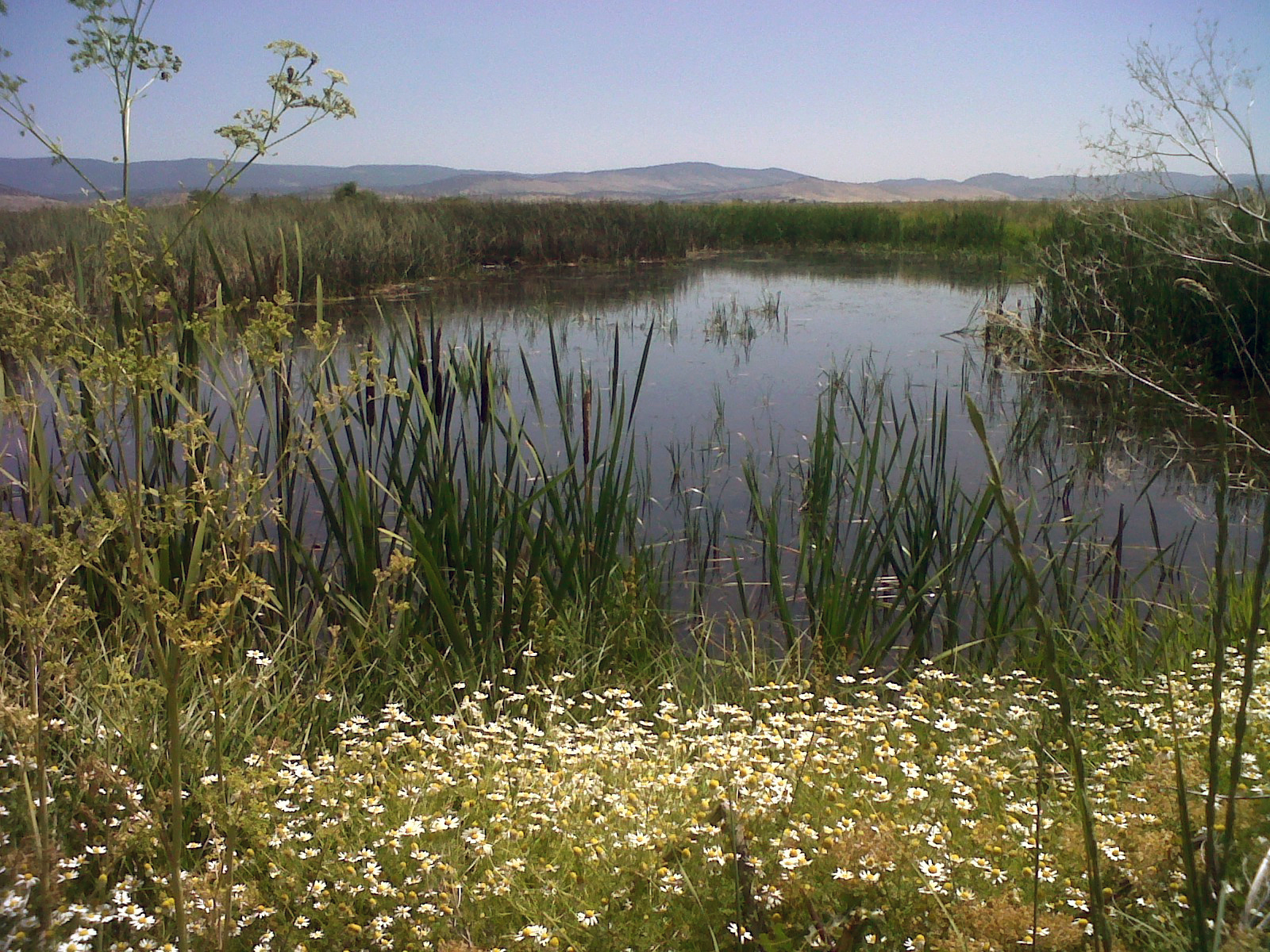

- Location within California Location within the United States
- Location: Lassen County, California
- Nearest city: Alturas, CA
- Coordinates: 41°10′34.7124″N 121°4′7.6692″W
- Area: 14,582 acres (59.01 km^{2})
- Established: 1986
- Governing body: California Department of Fish and Wildlife

The Ash Creek State Wildlife Area is a protected region managed by the California Department of Fish and Wildlife (CDFW) in the heart of Big Valley. Spanning approximately 14,500 acres, it comprises various natural habitats and serves as a vital sanctuary for diverse plant and animal species.

== Overview ==
Previously known as Ash Creek Wildlife Refuge, the area was renamed to Ash Creek State Wildlife Area after the California Department of Fish and Game licensed waterfowl hunting within its boundaries. It is one of the most remote, least improved, and pristine wildlife areas managed by the CDFW.

== Habitat ==
The Ash Creek State Wildlife Area primarily consists of freshwater wetlands, which are formed by the seasonal flow of six streams, including Ash Creek. The region contains 3,000 acres of natural wetlands, vernal pools, and upland sagebrush. The wildlife area boasts the largest acreage of vernal pools in the watershed, providing a unique habitat for various plant and invertebrate species.

=== Flora and fauna ===
Various mammal and bird species inhabit the Ash Creek State Wildlife Area. Mammals include pronghorn antelope, beaver, and bobcat. Bird species range from waterfowl, sandhill cranes, falcons, sage grouse, short-eared owls, to bald eagles.

== Recreational activities ==
The Ash Creek State Wildlife Area is popular among hunters, who travel from across California and neighboring states to hunt waterfowl during fall and winter. Other recreational activities available include fishing and bird watching. Ash Creek offers opportunities for catching local trout, and bird watching during fall and spring migration.

== Historic sites ==
Two historic barns, remnants of a time when the area was a working ranch, can be accessed via a county road from the east.

== Access and routes ==
Visitors can travel via paved roads around the Ash Creek State Wildlife Area, beginning at the mill north of Bieber, California. The route offers views of the wetlands and a chance to explore the historic barns. Visitors can also find refreshments and a picnic spot at Adin Supply, a market located on the bank of Ash Creek in the town of Adin.
