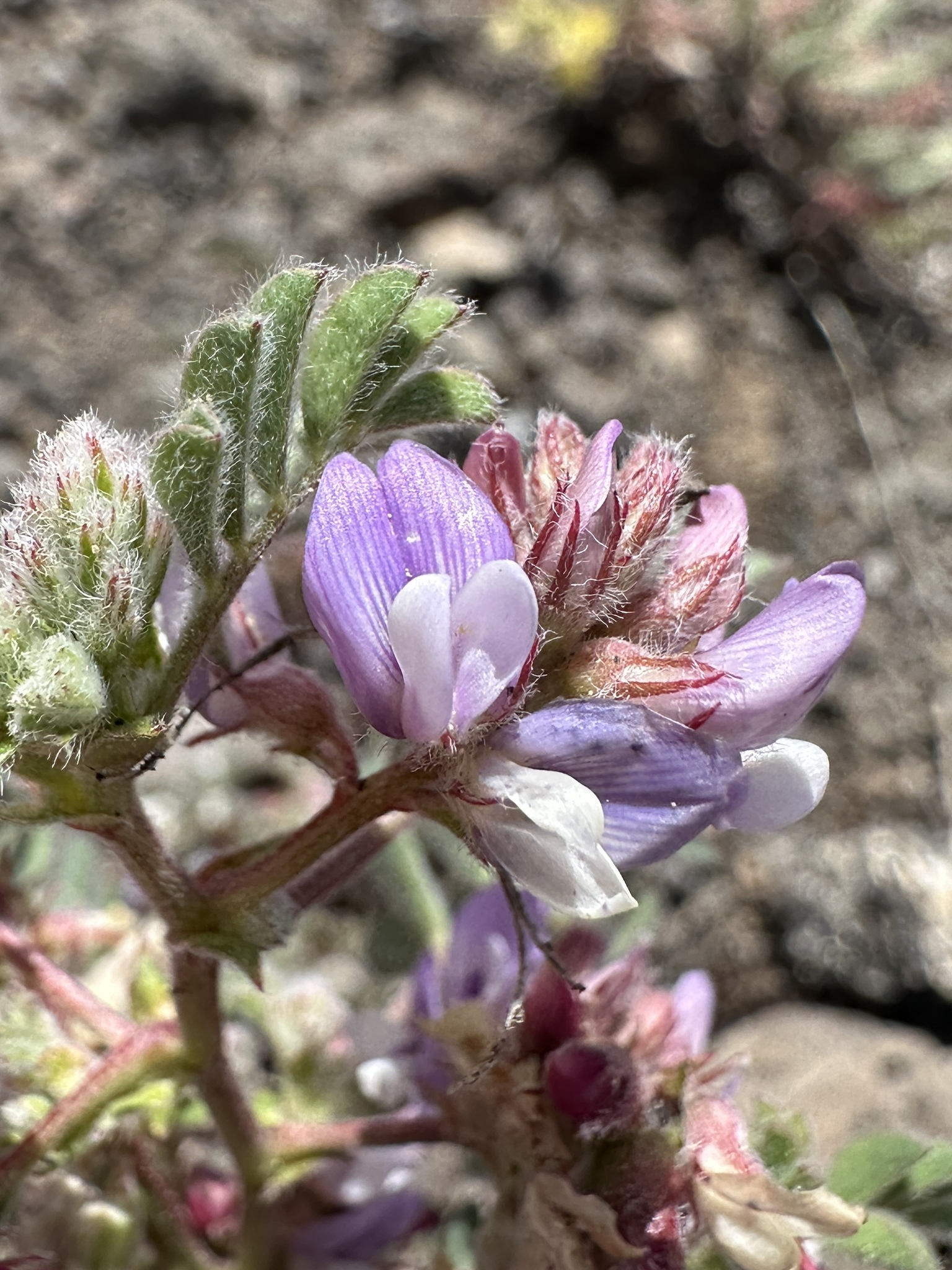
- Close up of flowers

Conservation status
- Critically Imperiled (NatureServe)

Scientific classification
- Kingdom: Plantae
- Clade: Embryophytes
- Clade: Tracheophytes
- Clade: Spermatophytes
- Clade: Angiosperms
- Clade: Eudicots
- Clade: Rosids
- Order: Fabales
- Family: Fabaceae
- Subfamily: Faboideae
- Genus: Astragalus
- Species: A. anxius

Binomial name
- Astragalus anxius Meinke & Kaye

Synonyms
- Astragalus tegetarioides var. anxius (Meinke & Kaye) S.L.Welsh

= Astragalus anxius =

Plant species in the pea family

Astragalus anxius is a rare species of milkvetch known by the common names troubled milkvetch and Ash Valley milkvetch. It is endemic to northern Lassen County, California, where it is critically imperiled. It was formally described in 1992.

== Description ==
Astragalus anxius is a perennial herb forming a matted patch of slender, delicate stems no longer than 20 centimeters. It is coated thinly in wavy hairs. The leaves are a few centimeters long and made up of several leaflets. The inflorescence contains 7 to 15 pealike flowers. Each flower is bicolored, the lower petals usually white and the upper banner petals purple to purple-veined white. The fruit is a hairy, oval-shaped legume pod up to half a centimeter long which dries to a papery texture.

== Taxonomy ==
Astragalus anxius was first described in 1992, when it was separated from Astragalus tegetarioides. Some sources treat it as a variety of A. tegetarioides, A. tegetarioides var. anxius.

== Distribution ==
Astragalus anxius is endemic to northern Lassen County, California, where it grows in the volcanic soil of the Modoc Plateau. There are 97 observations as of 2019 reported to Calflora.org, some of which are threatened by livestock trampling.
