= Warner Mountains National Forest =

Former National Forest in California, United States of America

Warner Mountains National Forest was established as the Warner Mountains Forest Reserve by the United States General Land Office in California on November 29, 1904 with 306,518 acres (1,240.43 km^{2}). After the transfer of federal forests to the U.S. Forest Service in 1905, it became a National Forest on March 4, 1907. On July 1, 1908 the forest was combined with Modoc National Forest and the name was discontinued.
