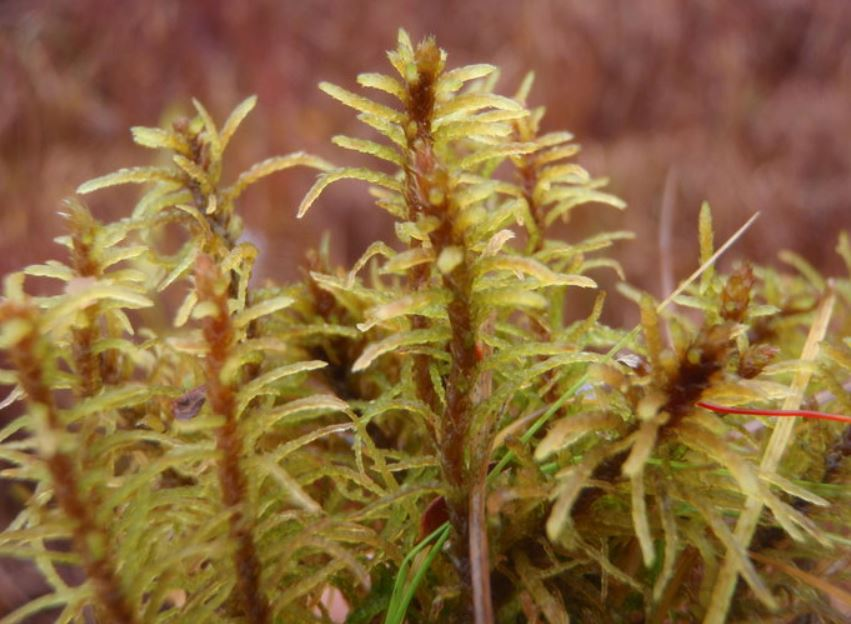
- Helodium blandowii

Scientific classification
- Kingdom: Plantae
- Division: Bryophyta
- Class: Bryopsida
- Subclass: Bryidae
- Order: Hypnales
- Family: Helodiaceae; Ochyra

= Helodiaceae =

Family of plants

Helodiaceae is a family of mosses belonging to the order Hypnales.

Genera:

- Actinothuidium (Besch.) Broth.
- Bryochenea C. Gao & K.C. Chang
- Elodium (Sull.) Austin
- Helodium Warnst.
