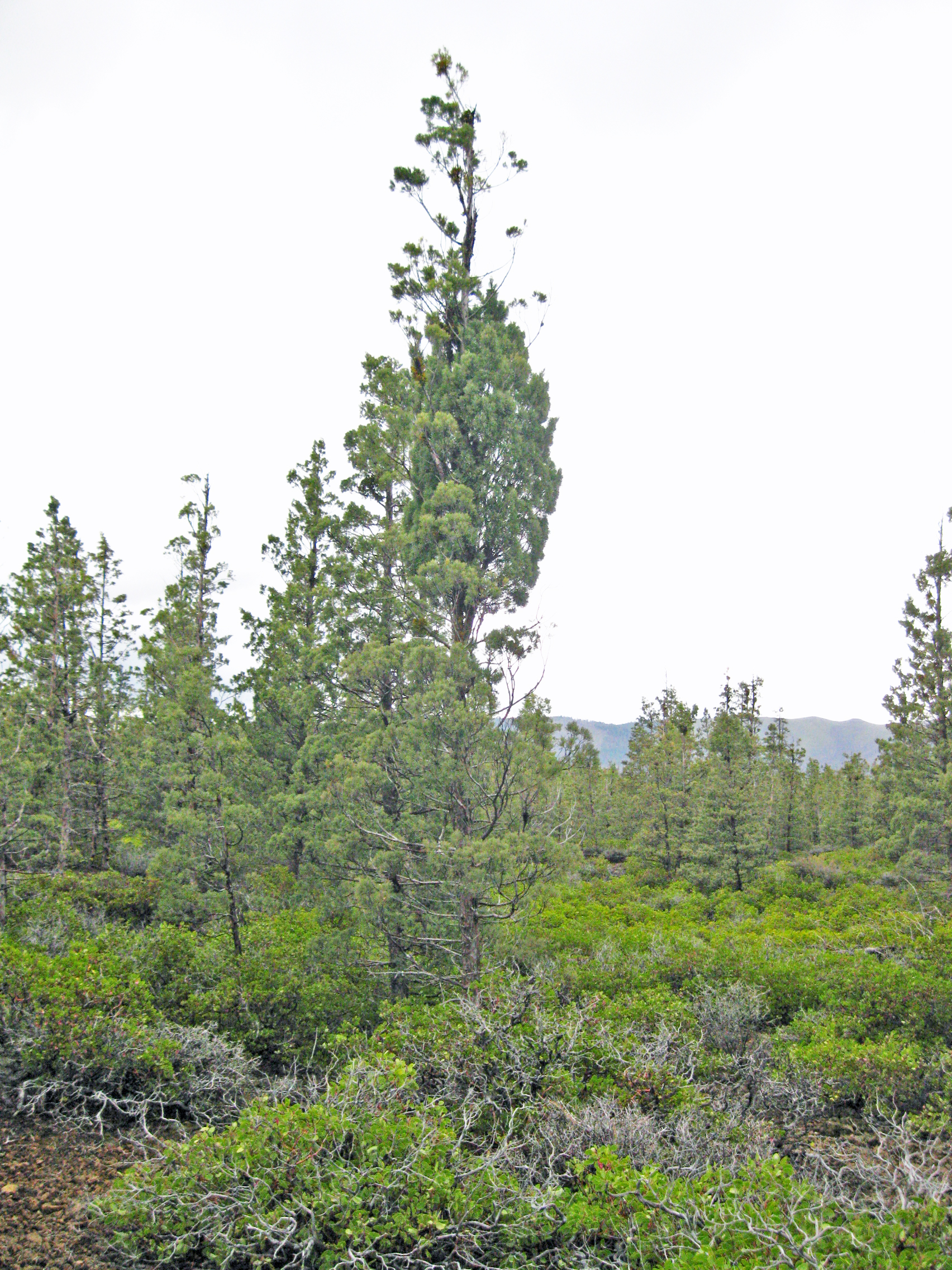

Conservation status
- Vulnerable (IUCN 3.1)

- Vulnerable (NatureServe)

Scientific classification
- Kingdom: Plantae
- Clade: Tracheophytes
- Clade: Gymnosperms
- Division: Pinophyta
- Class: Pinopsida
- Order: Cupressales
- Family: Cupressaceae
- Genus: Hesperocyparis
- Species: H. bakeri

Binomial name
- Hesperocyparis bakeri (Jeps.) Bartel
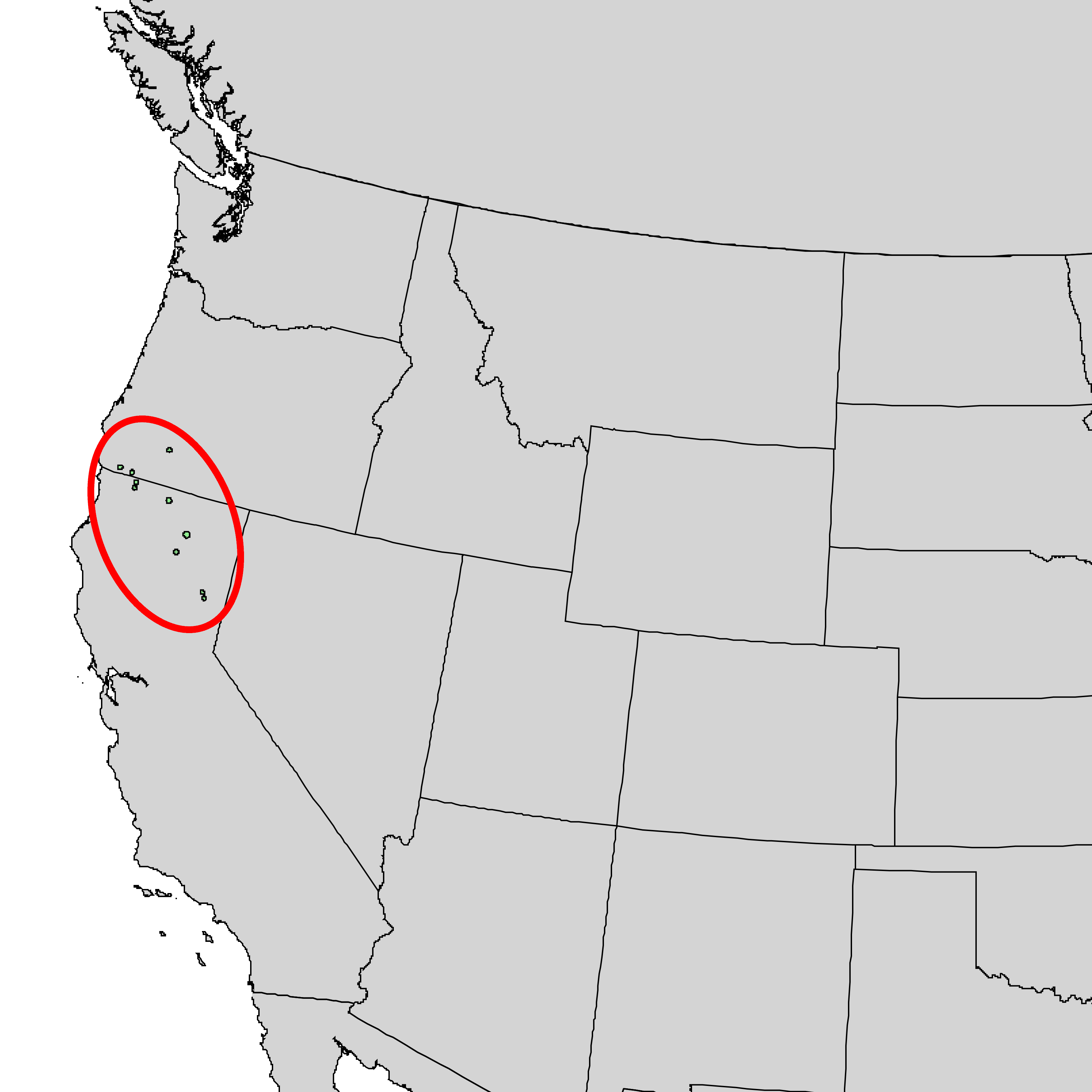
- Natural range

Synonyms
- List: Callitropsis bakeri (Jeps.) D.P.Little; Cupressus bakeri Jeps.; Cupressus bakeri subsp. typica C.B.Wolf; Cupressus macnabiana var. bakeri (Jeps.) Jeps.; Neocupressus bakeri (Jeps.) de Laub.; Cupressus bakeri subsp. mathewsii C.B.Wolf

= Hesperocyparis bakeri =

Western North American species of conifer

Hesperocyparis bakeri, the Baker cypress, Modoc cypress, or Siskiyou cypress, is a rare species of conifer in the cypress family, Cupressaceae. It is a tree endemic to a small area across far northern California and extreme southwestern Oregon, in the western United States.

== Description ==
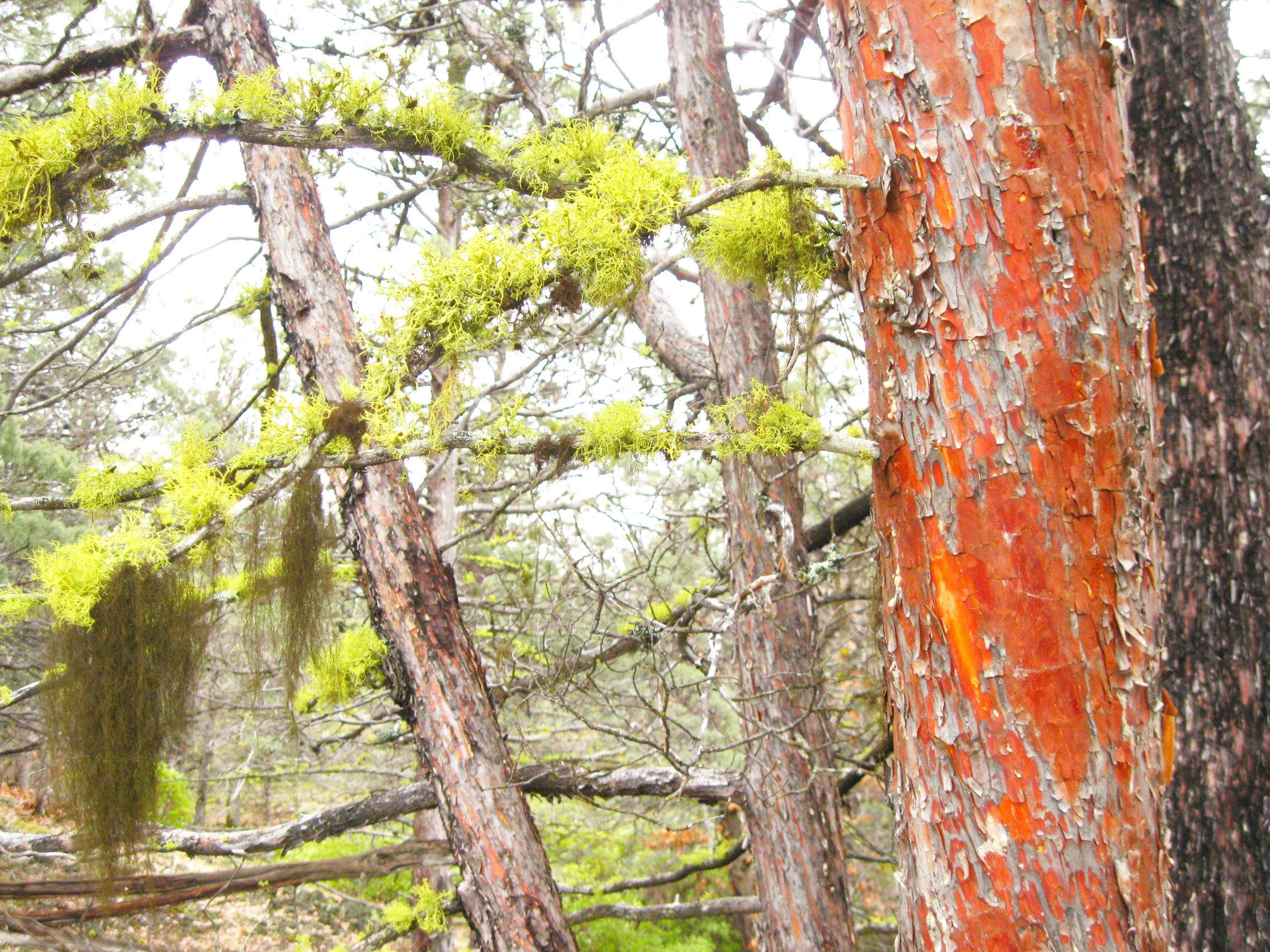
Trunk of a young tree

Hesperocyparis bakeri is a tree with a conical crown, growing to heights of 9–25 meters (30–82 ft), exceptionally to 39 m (130 ft), and a trunk diameter of up to 50 centimeters (20 inches), exceptionally to 1 m (40 in). The bark is thin, red when young, and gray in maturity.

The foliage grows in sparse, very fragrant, usually pendulous sprays, varying from dull gray-green to glaucous blue-green in color. The leaves are scale-like, 2–5 millimeters long, and produced on rounded (not flattened) shoots.

The seed cones are globose to oblong, covered in warty resin glands, 10–25 mm (3/8–1 in) long, with 6 or 8 (rarely 4 or 10) scales, green to brown at first, maturing gray or gray-brown about 20–24 months after pollination. The male cones are 3–5 mm long, and release pollen in February–March.

== Taxonomy ==
Hesperocyparis bakeri was given its first scientific description and named Cupressus bakeri in 1909 by the botanist Willis Linn Jepson. Jepson changed his mind about this classification in 1923, publishing a description of it as a subspecies named Cupressus macnabiana var. bakeri. Since that time the genus has also changed several times with the most recent being as part of Hesperocyparis.

As of 2024 Hesperocyparis bakeri is listed as the correct classification in Plants of the World Online (POWO), World Flora Online, and the USDA Natural Resources Conservation Service PLANTS database (PLANTS).

== Distribution and habitat ==
The tree grows in limited populations in southwestern Oregon's Josephine and Jackson counties, and slightly more populously in a small section of Northern California within Siskiyou, Modoc, Shasta, Plumas and Tehama counties. It is probably the northernmost cypress.

It is usually found in small, scattered populations, not in large forests, at altitudes of 900–2,000 m (3,000–6,600 ft). This includes locales in the Modoc Plateau, southern Cascade Range, Klamath Mountains, and northern Sierra Nevada. It is slow-growing in the wild, and is mostly restricted to sites difficult for plant growth, on serpentine soils and on old lava flows. Its tolerance of these sites enables it to avoid competition from much faster-growing trees. It is found in chaparral and yellow pine forest habitats.

== Ecology ==
The tree's thin bark makes it susceptible to wildfire, exposure to which is required to release the seeds; these then colonize the scorched earth left behind. Fire suppression policies of the past decades have severely limited reproduction of the species. It is listed as a vulnerable species on the IUCN Red List.

== See also ==
- Flora of the Klamath Mountains
- List of plants on the Modoc National Forest
- Milo Samuel Baker
- Rogue River-Siskiyou National Forest
