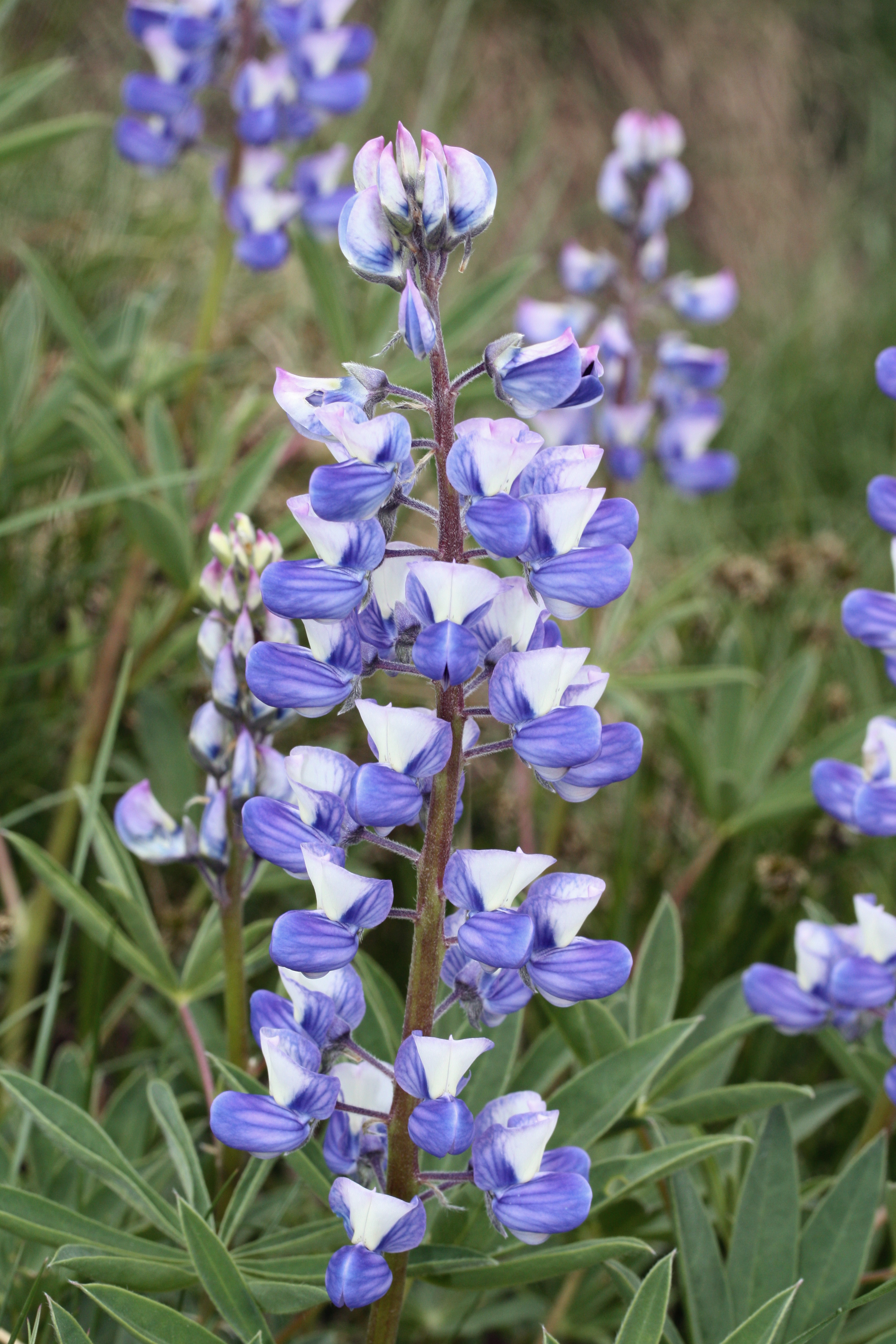
- Lupinus latifolius subsp. latifolius

Scientific classification
- Kingdom: Plantae
- Clade: Tracheophytes
- Clade: Angiosperms
- Clade: Eudicots
- Clade: Rosids
- Order: Fabales
- Family: Fabaceae
- Subfamily: Faboideae
- Genus: Lupinus
- Species: L. latifolius

Binomial name
- Lupinus latifolius Lindl. ex J.Agardh

= Lupinus latifolius =

Species of legume

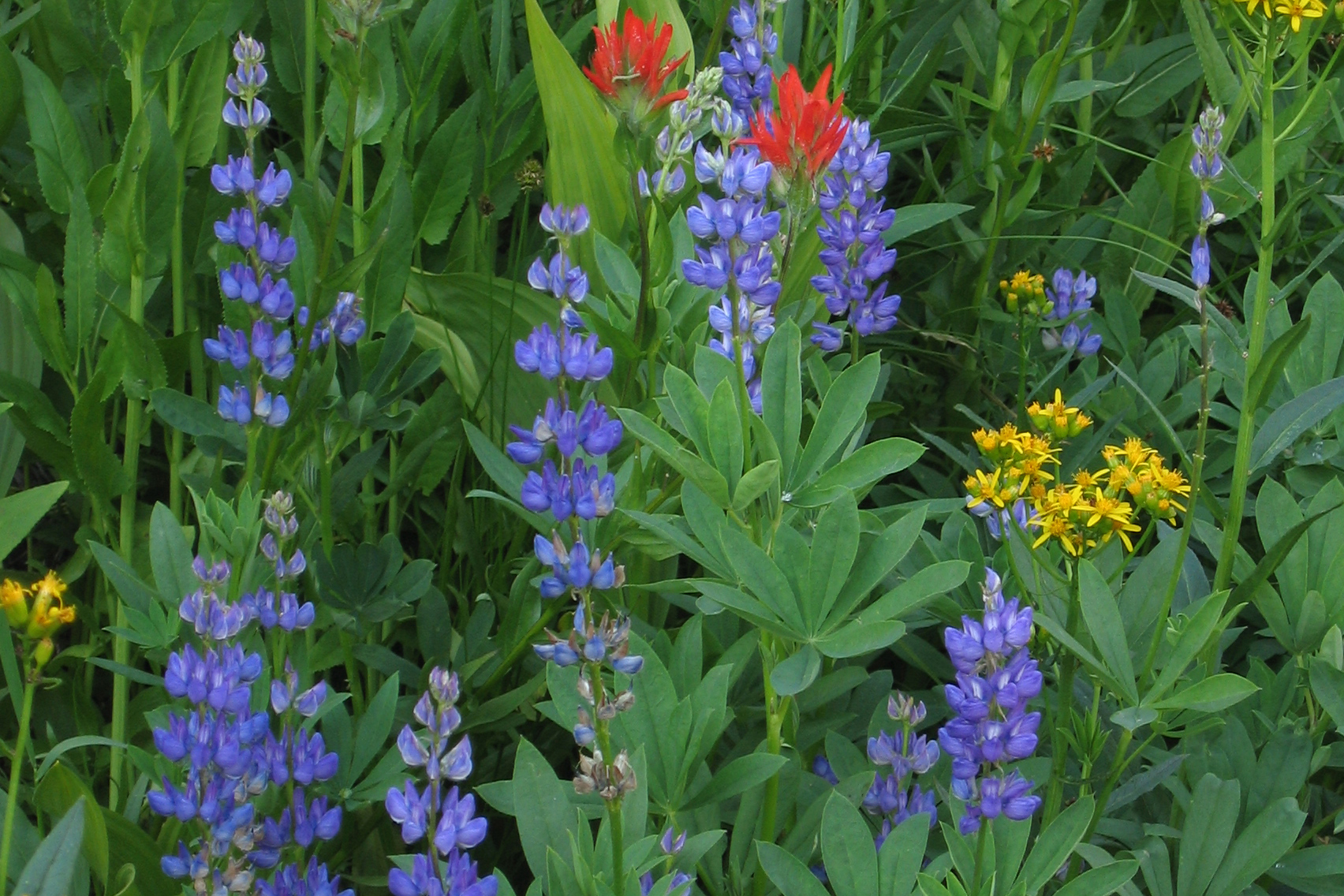
Lupinus latifolius plants in alpine meadow

Lupinus latifolius is a species of lupine known by the common name broadleaf lupine. It is native to western North America from British Columbia to Baja California to New Mexico, where it is common and can be found in several types of habitat. There are several subtaxa, described as subspecies or varieties, some common and some rare. They vary in morphology. In general this plant is an erect perennial herb. It grows 30 centimeters to over two meters in height, in texture hairy to nearly hairless. Each palmate leaf is made up of several leaflets, those on larger plants up to 10 centimeters long. The inflorescence bears many flowers, sometimes in whorls. Each flower is one to two centimeters in length, purple to blue to white in color, the spot on its banner yellowish, pinkish, or white.

One rare subtaxon, Lupinus latifolius var. barbatus, is endemic to the Modoc Plateau of northeastern California and adjacent territory in Oregon and Nevada. The subtaxon dudleyi is known only from the San Francisco Bay Area.

It is a larval host to Boisduval's blue, clouded sulphur, orange sulphur, Persius duskywing, and silvery blue butterflies.
