= Edward Lee Greene =

American botanist (1843–1915)

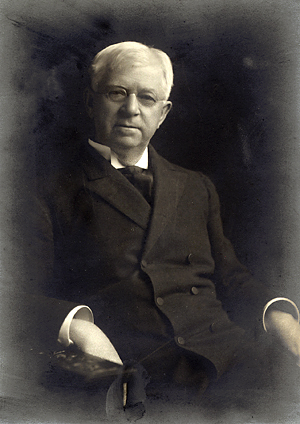
- Born: 20 August 1843; Hopkinton, Rhode Island, United States
- Died: 10 November 1915 (aged 72); Washington, D.C., United States
- Known for: Landmarks of Botanical History
- Scientific career
- Fields: Botany
- Author abbrev. (botany): Greene

Edward Lee Greene (August 20, 1843–November 10, 1915) was an American botanist known for his numerous publications including the two-part Landmarks of Botanical History and the describing of over 4,400 species of plants in the American West.

== Early life ==
Edward Lee Greene was born on August 20, 1843, in Hopkinton, Rhode Island. In 1859 Greene moved to Wisconsin and began studying at Albion Academy, a very reputable institution with a religious emphasis. There Greene met Thure Kumlien, a Swedish naturalist with an interest in botany. Greene accompanied Kumlein on field trips, further developing Greene's interest in botany. In August 1862, Greene joined his father and brothers in joining the 13th Wisconsin Volunteer Infantry Regiment of the Union Army. Though he never rose above the rank of private in his three years of service, Greene was able to advance his botanical studies, collecting specimens as he marched through Tennessee, Kentucky and Alabama.

Following his release from the Army, Greene returned to Albion Academy, earning his Bachelor of Philosophy in 1866. While in the service, Greene thought of moving west of the Mississippi, a desire he realized in 1870. With the aid of botanists Asa Gray of Cambridge, Massachusetts and George Engelmann of St. Louis, Missouri, Greene made preparations to study botany in the West. While in Colorado in 1871, Greene renewed his spirituality and became both a botany teacher and a candidate for Episcopal priesthood, becoming ordained in 1873. In February 1874 Greene assumed pastorship of a church in Vallejo, California, the beginning of many short stays with churches throughout the Southwest. During these travels, Greene continued collecting plants, making forays into Arizona, New Mexico, and Mexico. In 1876–1877, while Greene was an episcopal priest in Yreka, California, he discovered the first specimens of Phlox hirsuta, a small flowering plant found only in that area. He eventually accepted a position as rector of St. Mark's Episcopal Church in Berkeley, California.

Between his arrival in 1881 and 1883, Greene began to drift away from the Episcopal Church toward Roman Catholicism, costing him his congregation and his standing within the ministry. Locked out of St. Mark's, Greene gave in to pressure and resigned in 1883, converting to Catholicism only a year later.

== Academic career ==
Beginning in 1882, Greene began lecturing at the University of California. Following his resignation, he became curator of the herbarium at the California Academy of Sciences.

In 1885, was hired as the first professor of botany at the University of California, Berkeley (1885–1895). While he was chair of the newly founded botany department, Greene was one of only three American representatives to the International Committee on Botanical Nomenclature and president of the Madison Botanical Congress.

His controversial advocacy of nomenclature reform brought him into conflict with the president of the university, leading him to accept a position at the Catholic University of America in Washington, D.C., from 1895 to 1904. Greene then became an associate in botany at the Smithsonian Institution (1904–1915), transferring some 4,000 volumes and his valuable herbarium to the institution for a period of ten years.

Greene began to focus on the history of his field, publishing his seminal work Landmarks of Botanical History, Part 1 in 1909. The second volume was submitted to the Smithsonian as a work in progress but was never completed, the rough draft being published posthumously in 1936. While at the Smithsonian, Greene renewed contact with Fr. Julius Nieuwland, a professor of botany at the University of Notre Dame and a student from Greene's years at the Catholic University of America. Following the expiration of his agreement with the Smithsonian in 1915, Greene moved to South Bend, Indiana along with his library and herbarium specimens. Greene returned to Washington, D.C., in October that same year to continue work on the Landmarks of Botanical History, Part 2, which would eventually be published posthumously in 1983.

Edward Lee Greene fell ill while in Washington, D.C., and died in Providence Hospital on November 10, 1915.

== Legacy ==
By the end of his career Greene had named over 4,400 new species of plants, published 565 original papers, and amassed a library of over 4,000 volumes, some of which have no duplicates in North America.

Greene's library and collections remain at the University of Notre Dame in the Greene-Nieuwland Herbarium.
