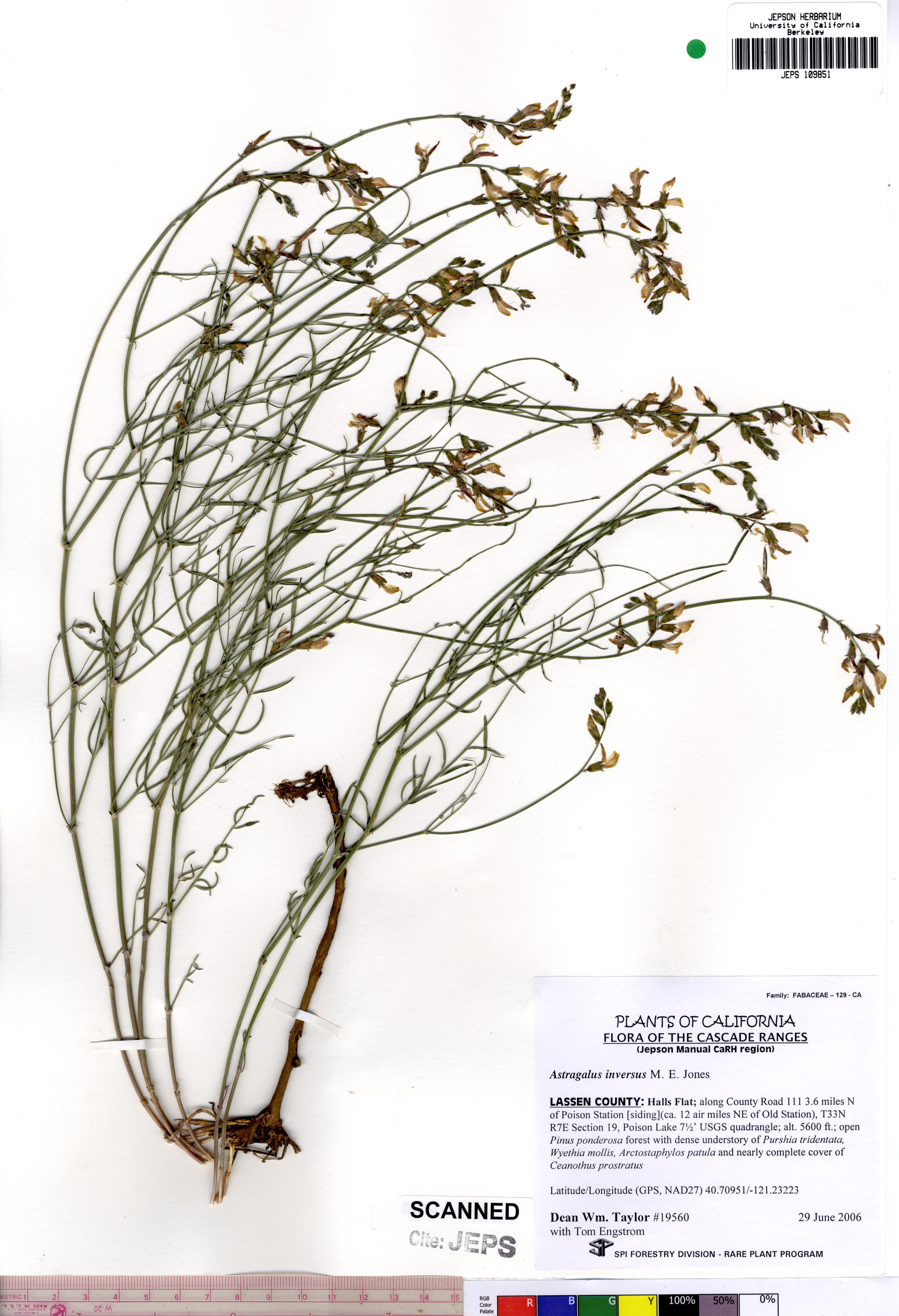

Conservation status
- Apparently Secure (NatureServe)

Scientific classification
- Kingdom: Plantae
- Clade: Embryophytes
- Clade: Tracheophytes
- Clade: Spermatophytes
- Clade: Angiosperms
- Clade: Eudicots
- Clade: Rosids
- Order: Fabales
- Family: Fabaceae
- Subfamily: Faboideae
- Genus: Astragalus
- Species: A. inversus

Binomial name
- Astragalus inversus M.E.Jones

Synonyms
- Astragalus filipes var. inversus (M.E.Jones) Jeps.; Homalobus inversus (M.E.Jones) Rydb.

= Astragalus inversus =

Plant species in the pea family

Astragalus inversus is a species of milkvetch known by the common name Susanville milkvetch.

It is endemic to the northeastern corner of California, between 900–1,980 metres (2,950–6,500 ft) in elevation. It grows in southern Cascade Range Yellow pine forests and dry Great Basin Sagebrush scrub habitats.

== Description ==
Astragalus inversus is a perennial herb with slender, wiry, mostly leafless stems growing 20 to 50 centimeters long. They grow upright or form a spreading clump. The leaves are up to 12 centimeters long and are made up of a few small, widely spaced narrow leaflets.

The whole size of the plant ranges from 0.7 to 1.6 ft tall. Its flower color comes in pink, yellow, and red. It hosts up to 21 butterflies and moths, including, the Painted Lady, the Silver-Spotted Skipper, and others native to northeast California.

The inflorescence is a loose array of 5 to 12 pale to reddish pink flowers, sometimes tinted with yellow. Each flower is about a centimeter long.

The fruit is a hanging legume pod 2 to 3.5 centimeters long, narrow and flat in shape and drying to a hairy, papery texture.

Its bloom period is May to September. It has major toxicity.

== Range ==
Susanville milkvetch only grows in four counties in northern California, Siskiyou, Shasta, Lassen, and Modoc counties.

== See also ==
- List of plants on the Modoc National Forest
