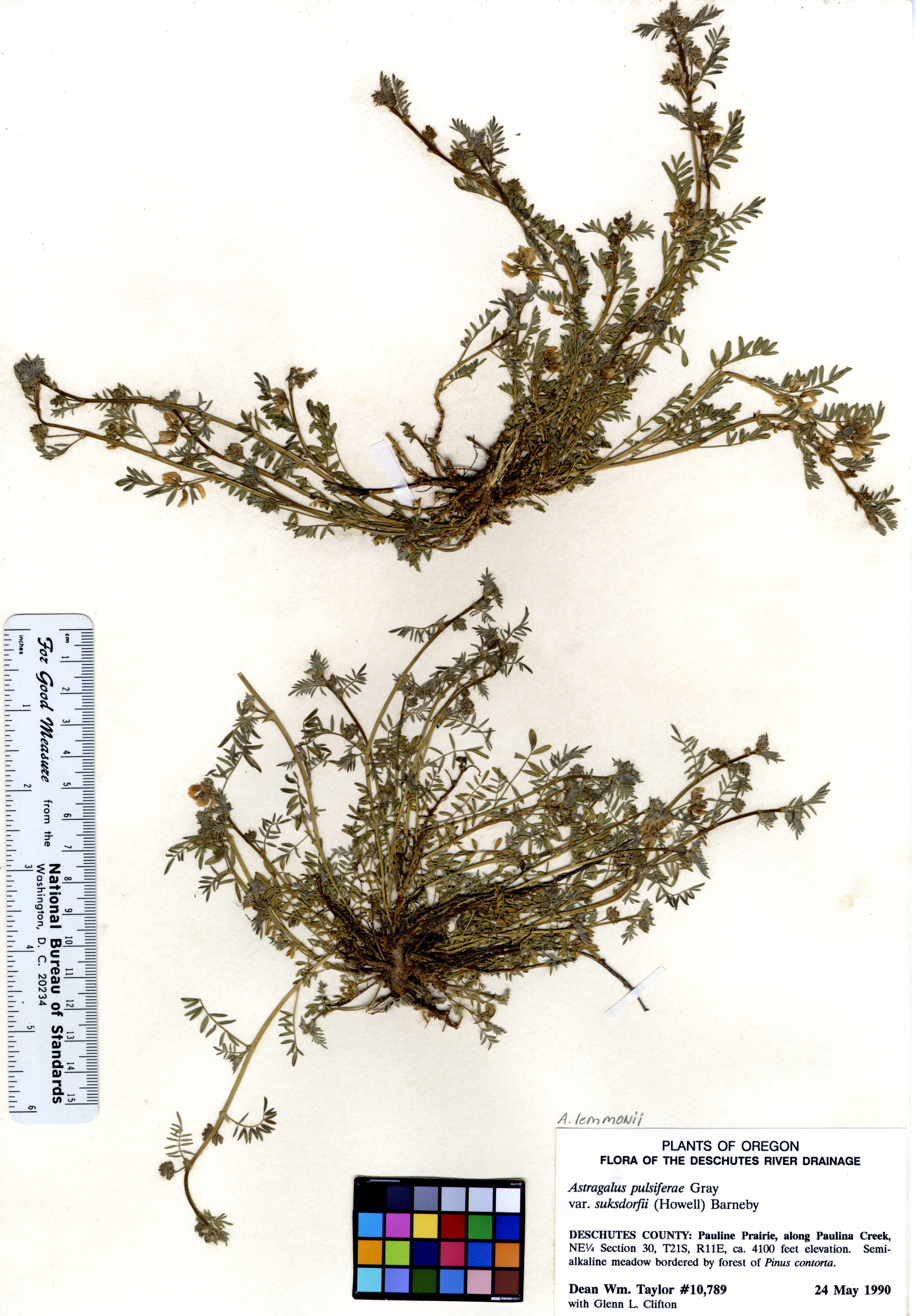

Conservation status
- Imperiled (NatureServe)

Scientific classification
- Kingdom: Plantae
- Clade: Embryophytes
- Clade: Tracheophytes
- Clade: Spermatophytes
- Clade: Angiosperms
- Clade: Eudicots
- Clade: Rosids
- Order: Fabales
- Family: Fabaceae
- Subfamily: Faboideae
- Genus: Astragalus
- Species: A. lemmonii

Binomial name
- Astragalus lemmonii A. Gray

= Astragalus lemmonii =

Lemmon's milkvetch

Species of legume

Astragalus lemmonii, the Lemmon's milkvetch, is a rare plant of eastern California. It is a member of the bean family, the Leguminosae (a.k.a. Fabaceae), and specifically a member of the subfamily Papilionoideae (a.k.a. Faboideae). The genus Astragalus is a large genus within this family; members of this genus are known as milkvetches or locoweeds. Close relatives of this particular species include Astragalus peckii and Astragalus lentiformis.

== Description ==
The plant is a perennial plant. It has a fleshy to woody taproot, loosely matted to open and widely branched, herbage green but sparsely strigose, with basifixed hairs.

Its several stems are slender and radiates from a superficial root-crown, prostrate to procumbent, herbaceous to the base, 10–50 cm, very sparsely strigose, floriferous from near the base. The stipules submembranous, semi- or fully amplexicaul but free, 2–5 mm.

The leaves measures 1–4½ cm. Leaflets are 7–15, narrowly elliptic, lanceolate to oblong to oblanceolate; tips acute, subacute, or exceptionally emarginate; sparingly appressed-pubescent, 2–11 mm. The terminal leaflet is generally much broader than the subfiliform rachis.

=== Inflorescence ===
The inflorescences are several and are often paired in the axils. These are distal, often 2 or 3 in one axil, one raceme of each pair usually developing much sooner than the other.

The peduncles are slender, filiform, incurved-ascending at anthesis, mostly 1–2 cm long (much shorter than the leaves). Several (2-13) flowers are clustered at the ends of the peduncles. These flowers are ascending in subcapitate racemes. The flower's calyx are thinly white- or partly black-strigulose to silky-villous; calyx-tube short-campanulate, ca. 2 mm, 4 mm high; the alternate setaceous-subulate calyx teeth equaling or longer than the tube, ca. 1½ mm. The corolla is ochroleucous (whitish), tinged or veined with dull lilac or purple; banner 4¾–6 mm, moderately recurved (45–85°); wings nearly as long; very obtuse keel, 3½–4 mm.

The pods are small, sessile, puberulent to strigose, spreading to declined, often humistrate, in profile ovoid-oblong, straight or a trifle incurved, obtuse at base, abruptly acute at apex to short-mucronate, thickened, incompletely to fully bilocular (2-celled), cordate in cross-section, trigonous or compressed-triquetrous, the lateral faces flat, the dorsal (upper or adaxial) face narrower and sulcate (grooved), carinate by the ventral suture, the dorsal suture shallowly to deeply sulcate; thin, papery, green to stramineous (brownish) valves strigulose, 4–7 mm long, 1½ -2½ mm in diameter, deciduous from receptacle, dehiscence primarily basal and occurs after falling. The ovary is strigulose and contains a few seeds (ovules 4–8).

== Distribution, habitat, and ecology ==
The plant is described as "scattered and not common." It ranges from eastern foothills of the Cascades in south-western Oregon to the Sierra Nevada of southern Inyo county in California, extending a little into Washoe county in far-western Nevada.

Found in moist places within Great Basin sagebrush scrub communities. More specifically, in moist grassy, sedgy, or rushy flats bordering streams and lake shores; vernally moist summer-dry alkaline meadows, seeps, marshes and swamps; occasionally found in non-wetlands. Found in rare and scattered colonies. Elevation of occurrence is 4,200 to 7,225 feet above mean sea level. Fire does not propagate well in the habitat of A. lemmonii, although the fire tolerance of the species itself is not known.

== Conservation status and threats ==
- U.S. Forest Service Pacific Southwest Region Sensitive Species.
- California Native Plant Society List 1B.2. List 1B: Rare, threatened, or endangered in California and elsewhere; 0.2: Fairly endangered in California
- NatureServe California State Rank S2.2; Global Rank G3.
- Some of the principal threats to this species are land conversion and pipeline construction.

== Field identification ==
The characteristic blooming period for this species is late May to early August, which time window is also considered the best period for definitive identification.

=== Synonymy ===
Tragacantha lemmonii (A. Gray) Kuntze, Revisio Generum Plantarum 2: 946. 1891.
