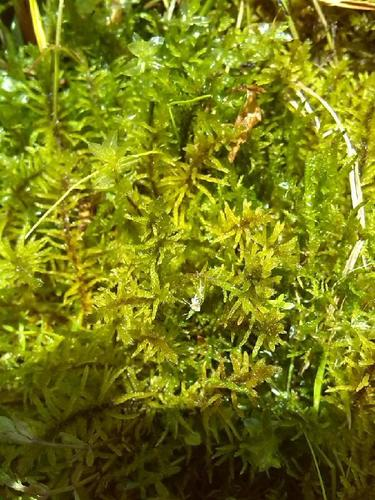

Conservation status
- Secure (NatureServe)

Scientific classification
- Kingdom: Plantae
- Division: Bryophyta
- Class: Bryopsida
- Subclass: Bryidae
- Order: Hypnales
- Family: Helodiaceae
- Genus: Helodium
- Species: H. blandowii

Binomial name
- Helodium blandowii (F. Weber & D. Mohr) Warnst.

= Helodium blandowii =

Species of moss

Helodium blandowii, also known as Blandow's helodium moss, Blandow's tamarisk-moss, Blandow's bogmoss, and Blandow's feathermoss, is a common moss species in Europe. It is also found in North America, Central Asia and Greenland. It is considered rare plant in the Western U.S., including Oregon and California. It occurs all around the northern hemisphere in higher latitudes, and in some places is not as rare as in the Western U.S.

== Technical description ==
- Plants yellow-green, in loose tufts: ascending even though pleurocarpous, regularly and closely pinnately branched, the branches all in one plane like a feather.
- Stems 4–11 cm long, more or less erect (quite stiff when dry), densely clothed in unbranched (but lobed) green filamentous paraphyllia becoming brown below.
- Branches unequal, simple, widely spaced on stem, about 1 cm long.
- Stem leaves large, more or less triangular-ovate, shortly and slenderly acuminate, somewhat plicate (concave), appressed except at the tips, with paraphyllia emanating from the decurrent leaf bases; margins plane or often revolute, entire or irregularly serrulate or dentate in the middle and lower part of the leaf; costa extending beyond the middle, 1.3–1.8 × 0.7–1 mm.
- Branch leaves small (about 0.8 mm long) and contorted when dry, broadly ovate-acuminate to ovate-lanceolate. Autoicous, the perigonia and perichaetia on the stems.
- Seta 3–5 cm long, slender, reddish brown.
- Capsules rare; when present, smooth, oblong-cylindric, becoming strongly arcuate (curved) and cernuous (incurved), the short neck somewhat wrinkled, the urn 2½–3½ mm long, yellowish-brown becoming reddish brown with age; operculum conic, pointed, to 0.8 mm long; annulus of 3 rows of deciduous cells; cilia 2–3, long, and more or less appendiculate.
- Spores smooth, mature in August.
- Calyptra cucullate.

== Distribution, habitat, and ecology ==
This species has a circumboreal distribution.

The habitat of Blandow's bogmoss is montane minerotrophic or "moderately rich" fens or mires, usually with calcareous groundwater, where it forms mats and small hummocks; sometimes it can be found under graminoids and shrubs at the edges of these aquatic features, or within them in small rivulets. Associated vascular plants include Agrostis idahoensis, Betula glandulosa, Salix geyeriana, Carex limosa, Eleocharis pauciflora, and Scheuchzeria palustris. Associated mosses include Aulacomnium palustre, Calligeron stramineum, Hamatocaulis vernicosus, Meesia triquetra, Tomenthypnum nitens, Philonotis fontana, Drepanocladus vernicosus, and Hypnum lindbergii. Fens with Scorpidium spp. or Drepanocladus revolvens, however, are too ion-rich, and not suitable habitat for H. blandowii.

The species was declared extinct across the British Isles in 1901 and has not been recorded there since.

The fire ecology of this plant is not known; however, fens rarely burn. Excess soot from a nearby fire, however, might negatively affect habitat quality.

== Conservation status and threats ==
U.S. Forest Service Pacific Southwest Region Sensitive Species.

California Native Plant Society List 2.3

NatureServe California State Rank: S1.3; Global Rank: G5

Fens are delicate habitats susceptible to impacts from livestock grazing, hydrologic alteration, construction and continued use of roads, and peat mining. Hydrologic alteration has caused the "well-documented extinction" of this species in Britain.

== Field identification ==
This species is superficially similar to other, somewhat related mosses, but presence in a fen habitat significantly helps in identifying this moss. Its feather-like, flattened stems and branches are distinctive, as are its yellow-green colour and the presence of dense paraphyllia on the stems. The pale, yellow-green colour might at first glance look like Sphagnum, but H. blandowii can be distinguished by its pinnate growth habit, as opposed to the fasciculate habit of Sphagnum.
