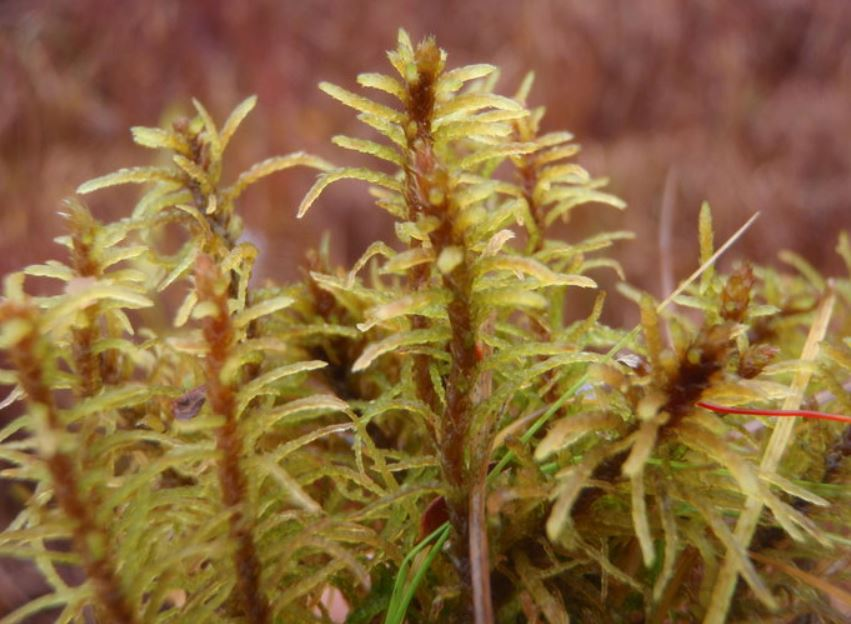
- Helodium blandowii

Scientific classification
- Kingdom: Plantae
- Division: Bryophyta
- Class: Bryopsida
- Subclass: Bryidae
- Order: Hypnales
- Family: Helodiaceae
- Genus: Helodium; Warnst.

= Helodium =

Genus of mosses

Helodium is a genus of mosses belonging to the family Helodiaceae.

The species of this genus are found in Eurasia and Northern America.

== Species ==
As accepted by the GBIF;

- Helodium amurense Broth.
- Helodium blandowii Warnstorf, 1905
  - Helodium blandowii var. helodioides (Renauld & Cardot) H.A.Crum et al.
- Helodium paludosum Brotherus, 1908
- Helodium pseudoabietinum (Kindb.) Broth.
- Helodium sachalinense (Lindb.) Brot
