= Ash Creek (California) =

- Location of Ash Creek in California

Location
- Country: United States
- State: California

Physical characteristics
- Source: Ash Valley
  - coordinates: 41°01′03″N 120°39′10″W
  - elevation: 5,224 ft (1,592 m)
- Mouth: Pit River
  - location: Big Swamp, near Bieber
  - coordinates: 41°09′27″N 121°08′47″W
  - elevation: 4,131 ft (1,259 m)
- Length: 35 mi (56 km)
- Discharge
  - location: Adin
  - average: 71 cu ft/s (2.0 m^{3}/s)
  - minimum: 11.1 cu ft/s (0.31 m^{3}/s)
  - maximum: 2,950 cu ft/s (84 m^{3}/s)

Ash Creek is a 35-mile (56 km) long stream located to the east of the Cascade Range in northeastern California, flowing through Lassen County and Modoc County. It drains a semi-arid watershed composed mainly of volcanic hills and agricultural valleys.

It originates as a number of springs in the Ash Valley, in the Modoc National Forest, about 5 miles (8.0 km) west of Madeline in Lassen County. It flows northwest through a canyon into Ambrose Valley, past the Ash Creek Campground, then crosses into Modoc County and enters Round Valley where it turns southwest. At Adin, the creek is crossed by Highway 299 after passing through a gap in the hills into the much larger Big Valley, where it flows west roughly along the Modoc-Lassen county line. Near its terminus the creek feeds an extensive wetlands area known as Big Swamp, part of the Ash Creek State Wildlife Area. The creek joins with the Pit River on the western end of the swamp, about 2 miles (3.2 km) north of Bieber.

Although located in a semi-desert region the flow of Ash Creek is perennial. The California Department of Fish and Wildlife calls Ash Creek "one of the most remote, least improved and most pristine" wildlife areas in California. There are about 3,000 acres (1,200 ha) of wetlands which provide habitat for many species of mammals, waterfowl and birds of prey. The upper part of the creek, in the Modoc National Forest, is stocked annually with fish.

== See also ==
- List of rivers of California
