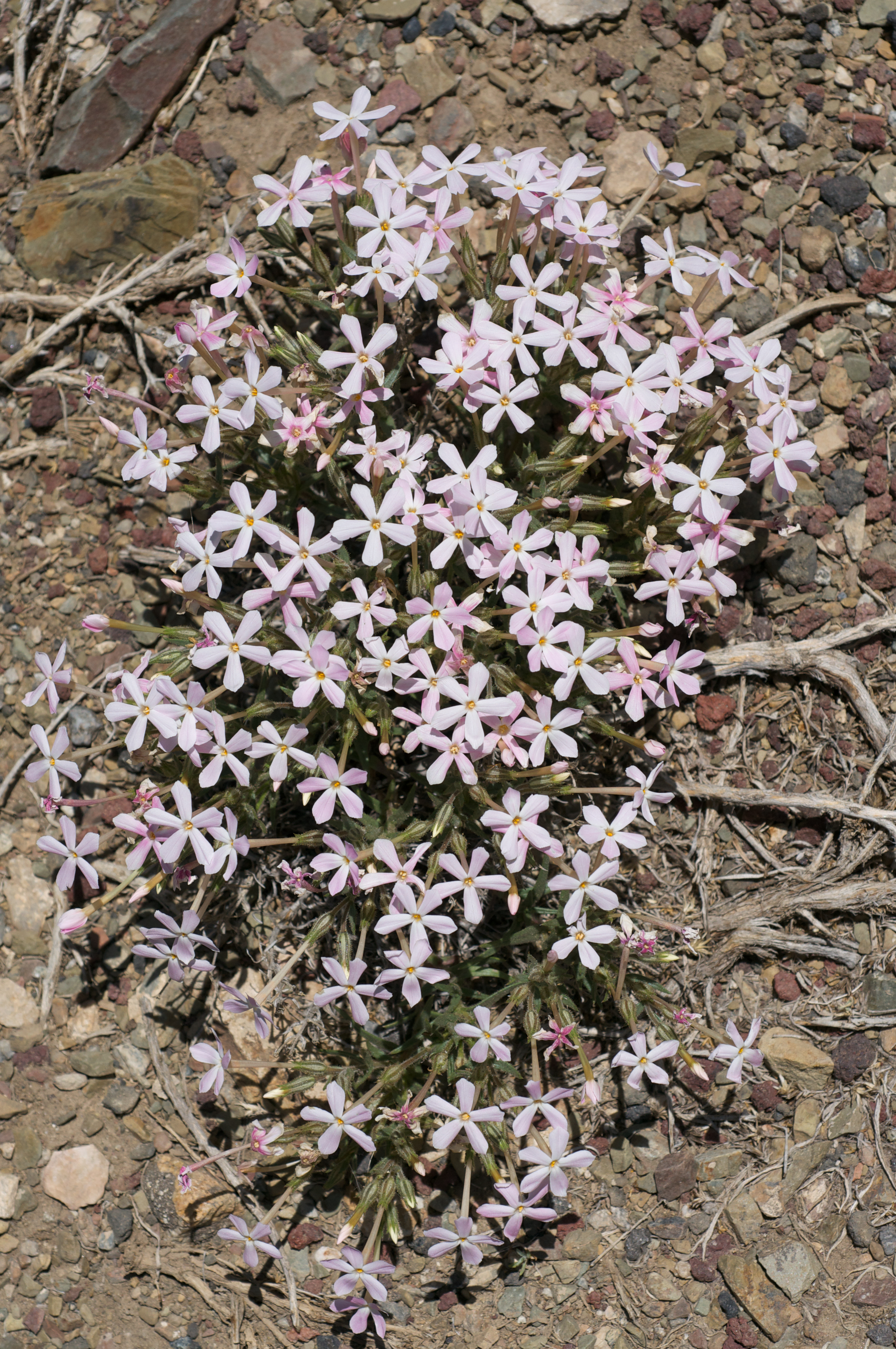

Conservation status
- Secure (NatureServe)

Scientific classification
- Kingdom: Plantae
- Clade: Embryophytes
- Clade: Tracheophytes
- Clade: Angiosperms
- Clade: Eudicots
- Clade: Asterids
- Order: Ericales
- Family: Polemoniaceae
- Genus: Phlox
- Species: P. stansburyi

Binomial name
- Phlox stansburyi (Torr.) A.Heller

= Phlox stansburyi =

Plant species in the phlox family

Phlox stansburyi is a species of phlox known by the common names cold-desert phlox and pink phlox. It is native to the southwestern United States from California to Utah to Texas, where it occurs in desert and plateau scrub and woodland habitat.

It is a perennial herb taking an upright, branching form. The hairy linear or lance-shaped leaves are 1 to 3 centimetres (0.39 to 1.18 in) in length and oppositely arranged. The inflorescence bears one or more white to pink flowers with narrow, tubular throats which may exceed 3 cm (1.2 in) in length. The base of the tube is encased in a calyx of keeled, ribbed sepals. The flower corolla is flat and five-lobed. In drier environments, the corolla-lobes may be narrower and curled, and the plant may be shorter or grow up through other shrubs.

== Taxonomy ==
In 1859 botanist John Torrey scientifically described a new variety of Phlox speciosa which he named stansburyi. In 1897 Amos Arthur Heller reevaluated it and classified it as the species Phlox stansburyi. It is classified in the Phlox genus as part of the Polemoniaceae family. It has twelve synonyms.

Table of Synonyms
Name	Year	Rank	Notes
Phlox grayi Wooton & Standl.	1913	species	= het.
Phlox longifolia subsp. brevifolia (A.Gray) H.Mason	1951	subspecies	= het.
Phlox longifolia var. brevifolia (A.Gray) A.Gray	1878	variety	= het.
Phlox longifolia subvar. brevifolia (A.Gray) A.Gray	1871	subvariety	= het.
Phlox longifolia f. brevifolia A.Gray	1870	form	= het.
Phlox longifolia var. stansburyi (Torr.) A.Gray	1870	variety	≡ hom.
Phlox speciosa var. stansburyi Torr.	1859	variety	≡ hom.
Phlox stansburyi var. brevifolia (A.Gray) E.E.Nelson	1899	variety	= het.
Phlox stansburyi subsp. eustansburyi Brand	1907	subspecies	≡ hom., not validly publ.
Phlox stansburyi subvar. microcalyx Brand	1907	subvariety	= het.
Phlox stansburyi subsp. superba (Brand) Wherry	1942	subspecies	= het.
Phlox superba Brand	1907	species	= het.
Notes: ≡ homotypic synonym; = heterotypic synonym

== References and external links ==
- Jepson Manual Treatment
- Photo gallery
