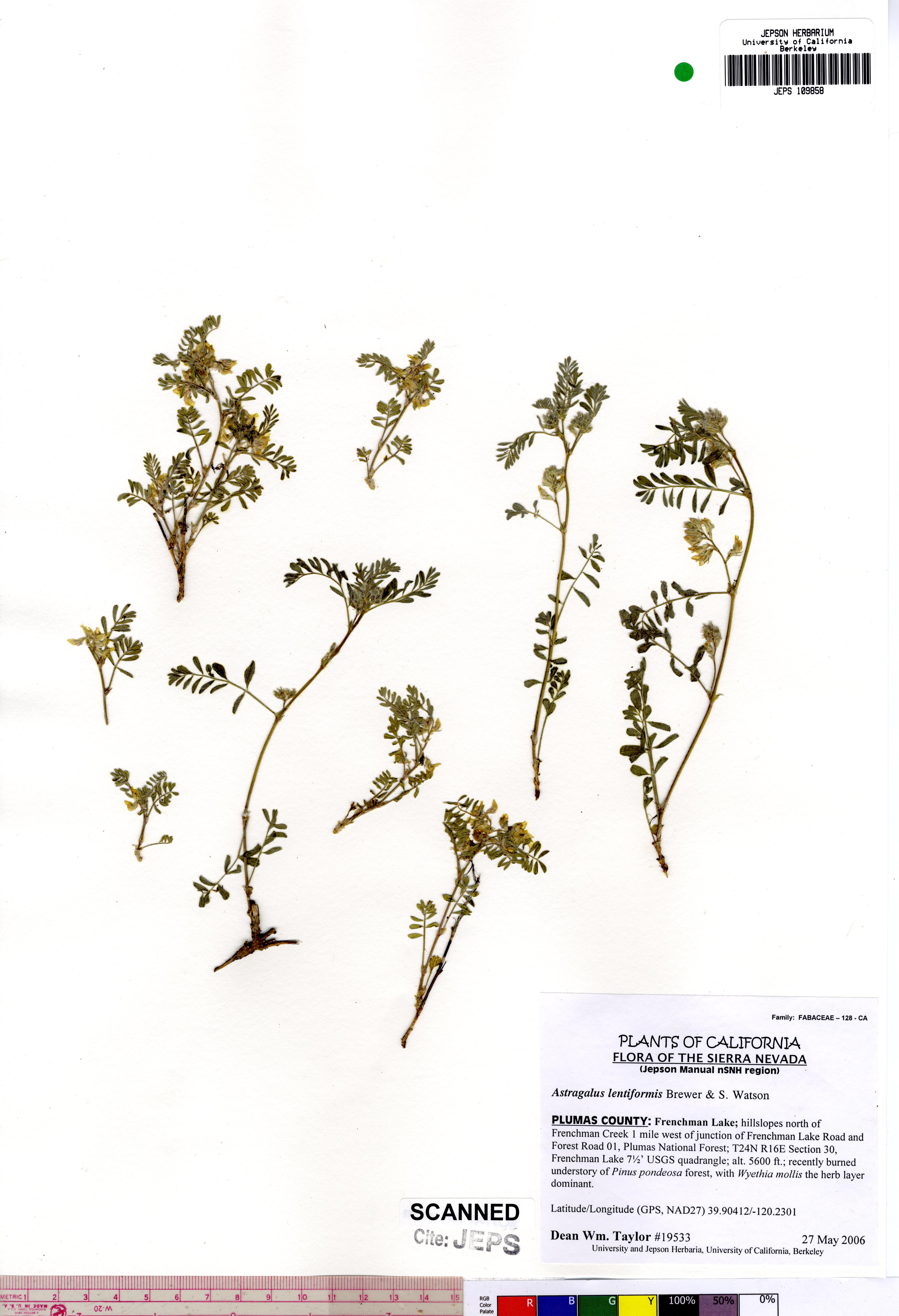
- Jepson Herbarium specimen sheet for Astragalus lentiformis

Conservation status
- Imperiled (NatureServe)

Scientific classification
- Kingdom: Plantae
- Clade: Tracheophytes
- Clade: Angiosperms
- Clade: Eudicots
- Clade: Rosids
- Order: Fabales
- Family: Fabaceae
- Subfamily: Faboideae
- Genus: Astragalus
- Species: A. lentiformis

Binomial name
- Astragalus lentiformis A.Gray ex W.H.Brewer & S.Wats.

= Astragalus lentiformis =

Species of legume

Astragalus lentiformis is a species of milkvetch known by the common name lens-pod milkvetch. It is endemic to the Sierra Nevada in eastern Plumas County, California, where it grows in chaparral scrub and coniferous forests.

== Description ==
Astragalus lentiformis is a small perennial herb forming a patch of spreading stems 10 to 20 centimeters long. The leaves are less than 4 centimeters in length and are made up of several narrow leaflets. Stem and leaves have a thin coat of fine grayish hairs.

The inflorescence is a small cluster of 5 to 10 off-white or pale yellow flowers each a few millimeters long. The fruit is a lens-shaped legume pod less than a centimeter long which is hairy and papery in texture.

== See also ==
- California interior chaparral and woodlands
- Flora of the Sierra Nevada (United States)
