= Lupinus latifolius var. barbatus =

Klamath lupine

Conservation status
- Critically Imperiled (NatureServe)

Scientific classification
- Kingdom: Plantae
- Clade: Tracheophytes
- Clade: Angiosperms
- Clade: Eudicots
- Clade: Rosids
- Order: Fabales
- Family: Fabaceae
- Subfamily: Faboideae
- Genus: Lupinus
- Species: L. latifolius
- Variety: L. l. var. barbatus

Trinomial name
- Lupinus latifolius var. barbatus (L.F.Hend.) Munz

Variety of legume

Lupinus latifolius var. barbatus, the Klamath lupine, sometimes also called bearded lupine, is a very rare plant of the Western U.S., known only from northeastern California and southeastern Oregon. It is a rare variety of the generally common species L. latifolius, which is a member of the bean family.

== Technical description ==
- Stems stout, more or less fistulous, commonly several to many, branched above, 2 feet (0.61 m) or more high, hairy (glabrous to strigose, or rather villous, especially around the nodes).
- Stipules conspicuous, not adnate, not broad; long, villous with spreading hairs (or hirsute with ascending hairs), 5–10 mm.
- Leaves cauline; petiole 4–20 cm.
- Leaflets about 9, upper surface glabrous to hairy, lower surface sparsely subvillous, 3½ –5 (10) cm.
- Bracts conspicuous, long (8–12 mm), villous, deciduous.
- Raceme open, with a long (8–20 cm) peduncle.
- Pedicels slender, glabrate, 2–5 mm long.
- Flowers 8–10 mm, scattered, mostly pale; apex of the banner normally well reflexed from the upper margins of the wing-petals, its ventral meridian sulcus usually shallow, including very little of the wings. Keel ciliate on the upper edge.
- Ovary not very villous.
- Ovules 6–7.
- Fruit 2–4½ cm, quite densely hairy.
- Seeds 3–4 mm, mottled dark brown.

== Distribution, habitat, and ecology ==
Klamath lupine is distributed from northeastern California to southern Oregon.

This plant enjoys mesic conditions, and lives in wet, shady to open, sunny clay banks along streams and on the margins of meadows, within higher elevation conifer woodlands.

"Broadleaf lupine (Lupinus latifolius) is likely top-killed by fire. Established plants are probably resistant to fire-induced mortality because of perennating buds on the deep, lateral root system. It is likely that these characteristics provide for regeneration following fire. Depending on the severity of top-kill by fire, sprouting from the caudex would also be a possibility. Information is lacking on the regeneration of broadleaf lupine seed after fire. Research to date (2006) suggests that broadleaf lupine responds favorably to fire. It was reportedly common or abundant after fire in many locations. The current body of research provides no clear direction for using fire as a management tool for broadleaf lupine populations. The research discussed [in the article] does, however, indicate that fire has a positive influence on broadleaf lupine."

== Conservation status and threats ==
- U.S. Forest Service Pacific Southwest Region Sensitive Species
- California Native Plant Society List 1B.2
- NatureServe California State Rank: S1.2; Global Rank: G1; threatened by grazing

== Field identification ==
This plant most closely resembles other varieties of L. latifolius, and could potentially be confused for L. polyphyllus var. burkei. It occurs between about 4,925 feet (1,501 m) to 8,200 feet (2,500 m) above sea level, and flowers during June and July.
