= Modoc National Forest =

Protected woodland in northeastern California, United States

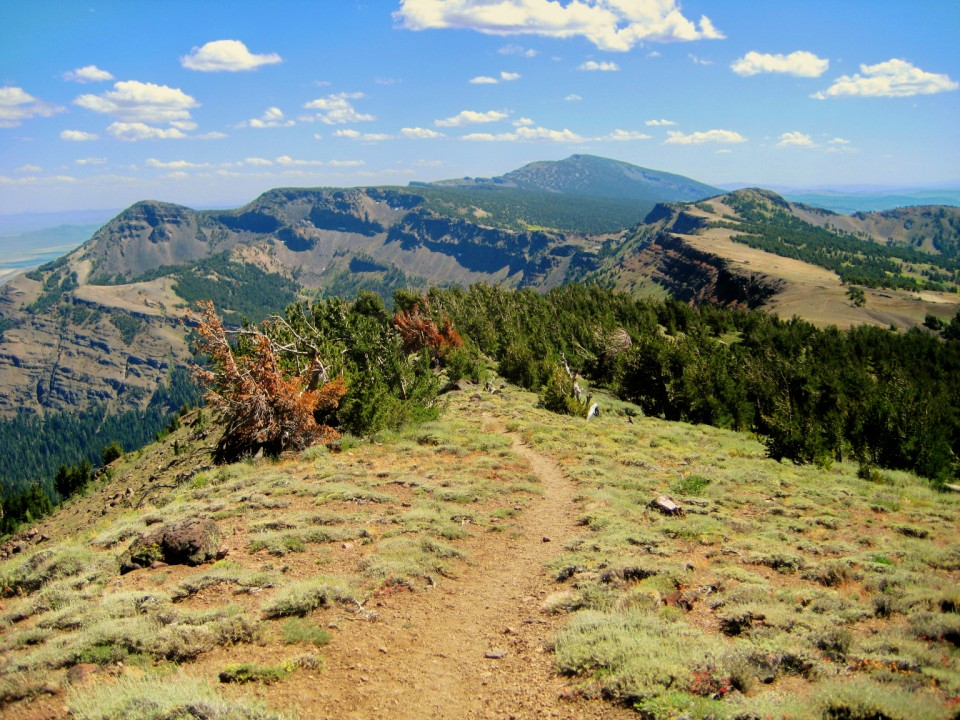
- Summit Trail in Modoc National Forest
- Interactive map of Modoc National Forest
- Location: Modoc County, Lassen County and Siskiyou County, California, United States
- Nearest city: Alturas, California
- Coordinates: 41°30′13″N 120°56′38″W
- Area: 1,654,392 acres (6,695.09 km^{2})
- Governing body: U.S. Forest Service
- Website: Modoc National Forest

Modoc National Forest is a 1,654,392-acre (6,695 km^{2}) U.S. national forest in Northeastern California.

== Geography ==
The Modoc National Forest protects parts of Modoc (82.9% of acreage), Lassen (9.4%), and Siskiyou (7.7%) counties. Most of the forest was covered by immense lava flows occurring over the last 500,000 years.

The eastern part of the forest east of Alturas contains the Warner Mountains. The Warner Mountains drop steeply on the eastern slopes, whereas the western flank has a more gentle topography.

== Ecology ==
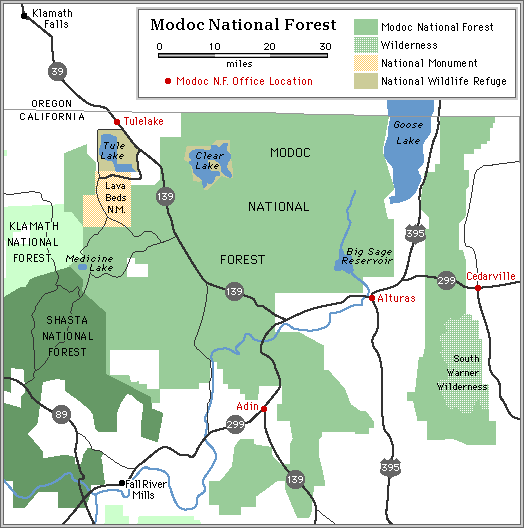
Map of the Modoc National Forest

Due to the elevation and precipitation differences, the forests hosts a large number of plant species. The western side of the brushy foothills consist mostly of bitterbrush and curl-leaf mahogany. As elevation increases, forests of ponderosa pine, white and red firs, incense cedar, and aspen give way to lodgepole and western white pines sprinkle towards the summit. Some 43,400 acres (176 km^{2}) of the forest have been identified as old growth, with lodgepole pine, ponderosa pine, white fir, incense cedar, and red fir being common constituents.

== History ==
Modoc National Forest was established as the Modoc Forest Reserve on November 29, 1904, by the United States General Land Office. It was named for the Modoc people who traditionally had their territory in this area. In 1905 federal forests were transferred to the U.S. Forest Service, and on March 4, 1907, they became National Forests. On July 1, 1908 Warner Mountains National Forest was added to Modoc. The South Warner Wilderness lies within the forest.

== Management ==
Forest headquarters are located in Alturas, California. There are local ranger district offices located in Adin, Alturas, Cedarville, and Tulelake.

== See also ==
- List of plants on the Modoc National Forest
- List of national forests of the United States
