= Modoc Plateau =

Plateau in the northeast corner of California, United States

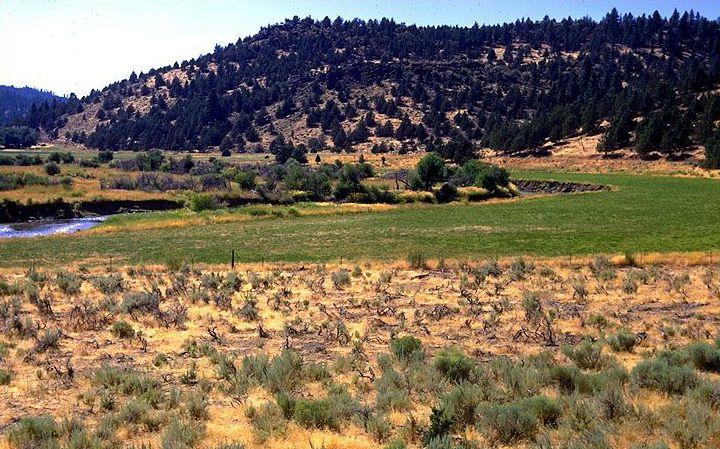
The Pit River winds through the Modoc Plateau.

The Modoc Plateau lies in the northeast corner of California as well as parts of Oregon and Nevada. Nearly 1,000,000 acres (400,000 ha) of the Modoc National Forest are on the plateau between the Medicine Lake Highlands in the west and the Warner Mountains in the east.

Its landform is volcanic table land ranging from 4,000 to 6,000 feet above sea level, cut by many north–south faults. "Occasional lakes, marshes, and sluggishly flowing streams meander across the plateau."

It is a thick accumulation of lava flows and tuff beds, along with many small volcanic cones. It has cinder cones, juniper flats, pine forests, and seasonal lakes. The plateau is thought to have been formed approximately 25 million years ago as a southern extension of the Columbia Plateau flood basalts.

== Vegetation and wildlife ==
Forested areas of the plateau include Ponderosa Pine (Pinus ponderosa), as well as other tree species such as California Buckeye (Aesculus californica). and Modoc Cypress (Cupressus bakeri).

The plateau supports large herds of Mule Deer (Odocoileus hemionus), Rocky Mountain Elk (Cervus canadensis), and Pronghorn (Antilocapra americana). There are also several herds of wild horses on the plateau. The Clear Lake National Wildlife Refuge and Long Bell State Game Refuge are located on the plateau as well.

== Watersheds ==
The Lost River watershed drains the north part of the plateau, while southern watersheds either collect in basin reservoirs or flow into the large Big Sage Reservoir, which sits in the center of Modoc County.

== See also ==
- List of plants on the Modoc National Forest
