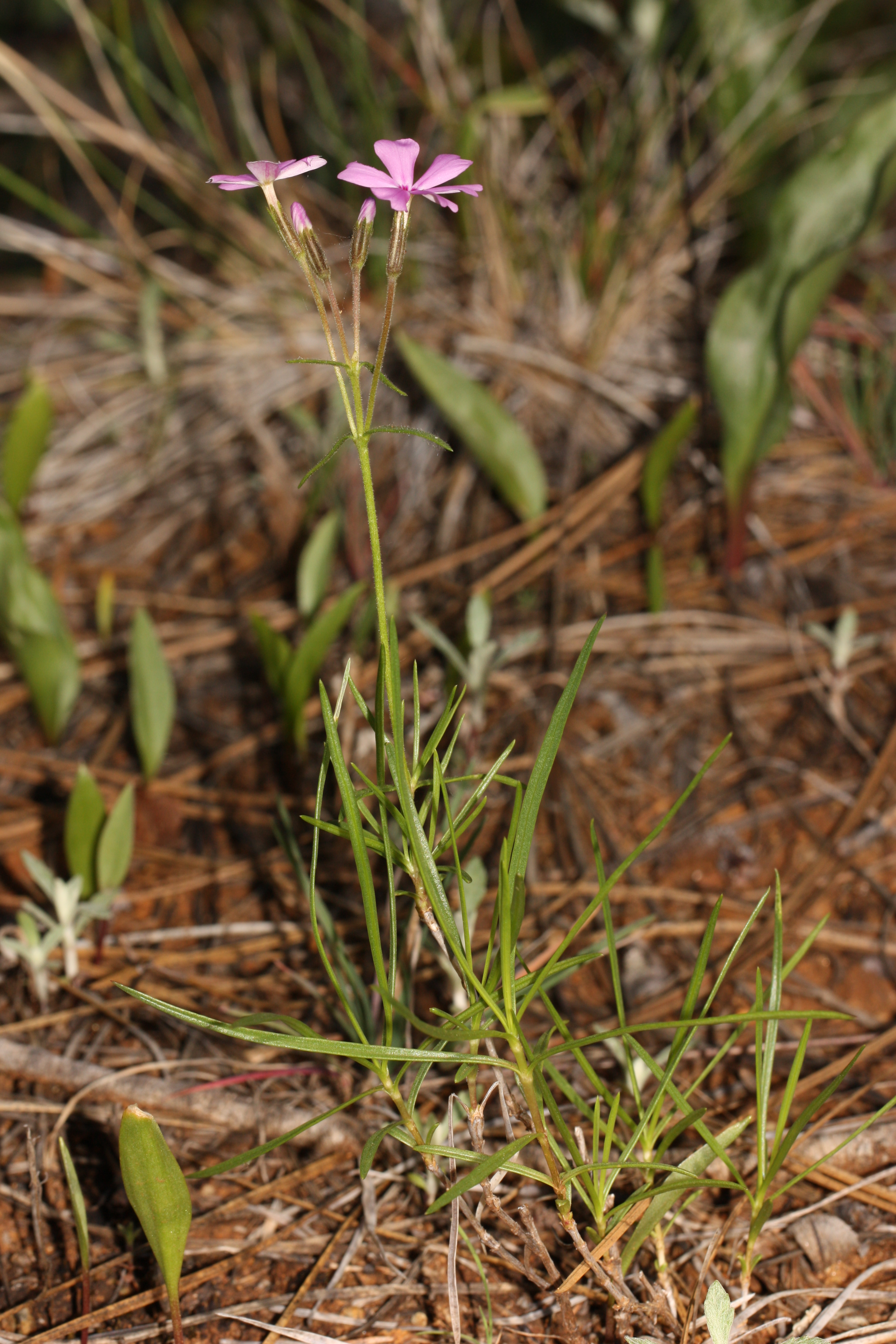

Scientific classification
- Kingdom: Plantae
- Clade: Tracheophytes
- Clade: Angiosperms
- Clade: Eudicots
- Clade: Asterids
- Order: Ericales
- Family: Polemoniaceae
- Genus: Phlox
- Species: P. speciosa

Binomial name
- Phlox speciosa Pursh

= Phlox speciosa =

Species of flowering plant

Phlox speciosa is a species of phlox known by the common name showy phlox. It is native to western North America from British Columbia to Arizona and New Mexico, where it occurs in sagebrush, pine woodlands, and mountain forests.

It is an erect perennial herb with a shrubby base growing up to about 40 centimeters tall. The leaves are linear or lance-shaped, oppositely arranged, and generally glandular.

The inflorescence bears one or more white to pink flowers with elongated tubular throats each up to about 1.5 centimeters long. The corolla has five double-lobed, notched, or heart-shaped lobes.

There are several subspecies, most being limited to certain sections of the plant's overall distribution.

== Description ==
Phlox speciosa has an erect stem. Leaves are between 1–5 cm and lance-linear. Terminal inflorescence with leaf-like bracts below; pedicel 3–20 mm and slender. The calyx is 7–10 mm, membrane not keeled; corolla bright pink to white, with heart-shaped lobes, tube 10–15 mm, lobes obcordate to deeply 2-lobed; stamens short, anthers in corolla tube; style 0.4–2 mm, stigmas > style. Rocky, wooded slopes, sagebrush scrub; 500–2400 m. Several subspecies named, study needed. Flowers Apr- Jun.

== Distribution ==
The plant is widely distributed, occurring at many serpentine sites throughout the western United States. In southern Oregon specifically, P. speciosa has been known to co-occur with Darlingtonia californica the Eight Dollar Mountain Botanical Wayside, managed by the BLM (Medford District.) Additionally, this plant is known to occur in the Deer Creek Center near Selma, Oregon.
