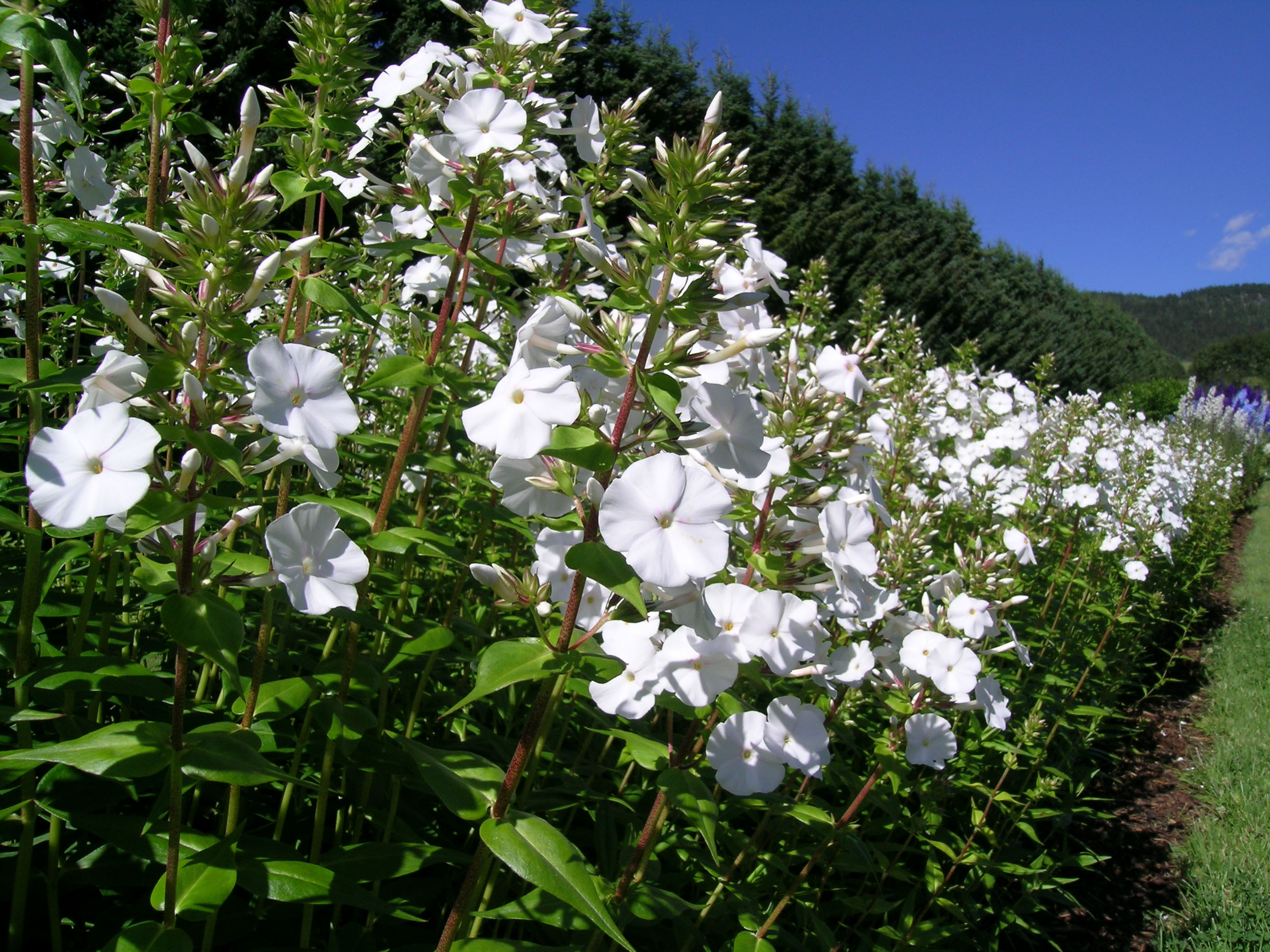
- Phlox carolina 'Mrs Lingard'

Scientific classification
- Kingdom: Plantae
- Clade: Tracheophytes
- Clade: Angiosperms
- Clade: Eudicots
- Clade: Asterids
- Order: Ericales
- Family: Polemoniaceae
- Genus: Phlox
- Species: P. carolina

Binomial name
- Phlox carolina L.

= Phlox carolina =

Species of flowering plant

Phlox carolina, the thickleaf phlox, is a species of flowering plant in the family Polemoniaceae. It is an herbaceous perennial growing to 1.2 m (4 ft) tall by 45 cm (18 in) wide, with leaves to 13 cm (5 in) long, and purple or pink flowers in summer. The specific epithet carolina refers to its native habitat in the eastern United States. It grows in woodland edges and openings. Flowers attract bees, hummingbirds, and butterflies.

It is the parent of numerous garden cultivars, of which 'Bill Baker' (pink) and 'Miss Lingard' (pure white) have gained the Royal Horticultural Society's Award of Garden Merit.

== Description ==
Phlox carolina grows from 1 to 5 feet tall, typically 2 to 3 feet tall, and 1 to 2 feet wide at maturity. It is a herbaceous perennial.

Phlox carolina flowers from May to late June, flowering indeterminately throughout the season. The flowers are less than one inch in length and are pink, purple, or white. They are located in bunches or a dome shape at the top of the plant. The inflorescence of Phlox carolina is panicle-shaped with a fragrant scent.

The leaf type of Phlox carolina is simple with an opposite arrangement, an entire margin, and a lanceolate to ovate shape. They are 1 to 4 inches long. The stem is red and is pubescently haired. The fruit is capsule-shaped and fully matured in summer.

== Taxonomy ==
Phlox carolina belongs to the order Ericales (rhododendrons), the family Polemoniaceae (Jacob's-ladder or phlox family), and the phlox group Ovatae.

It was described and named by several individuals before being included in Carl Linnaeus's second edition of Species Plantarum.

It was named and described many times due to taxonomic confusion. Phlox carolina was also historically used as a catch-all name for undescribed species of phlox. Some databases include Phlox carolina as a subspecies of Phlox glaberrima, or vice versa as the two species are similar. Previous names for Phlox carolina include Phlox caroliniana, Phlox altissima, Phlox triflora, Phlox suffruticosa, and Phlox heterophylla. These names are now either a different species of Phlox or a subspecies or variation of Phlox carolina.

Phlox carolina can be confused with similar-looking relatives such as Phlox paniculata, Phlox maculata, and Phlox glaberrima. The Phlox genus has lots of variation in phenotypes and tends to hybridize quickly, therefore gene sequencing often has to be used to identify which species a phlox is. This confusion is referred to as the "P. glaberrima complex". Plant geneticists use the ITS spacer of ribosomal and chloroplast DNA to differentiate P. carolina from other closely related Phlox species to resolve the complex.

== Distribution and habitat ==
Phlox carolina is native to the southeastern United States from Florida to Indiana west to east and from North Carolina to Texas north to south. It tends to grow in open forested areas, forest edges, roadsides, and clearings. It can also be found in gardens as an ornamental plant.

Phlox carolina grow in moist habitats and can grow in loam, clay, sand, or high-nutrient soil. It thrives in soil pH below 6.8. It is heat tolerant and grows in full sun or partial shade. Phlox carolina grows in hardiness zones 5a to 9b.

Phlox carolina is considered to be critically imperiled in West Virginia.

== Uses ==
Phlox carolina is often used as an ornamental plant in gardens, and it serves as a pollinator plant that attracts bees, hummingbirds, and butterflies. It serves as a food source for small mammals such as Cottontail Rabbits.

Phlox carolina is often used as a reference in gene studies to count the differing number of chromosome that differing species contain. Phlox carolina has 14 diploid chromosomes. Phlox carolina is also used as a Tall Phlox for studies on mechanical aspects of hybridization success in relation to height, as taller phlox species have longer pollen tubes and larger pollen grains than short phlox species.

== Cultivars ==
As a popular ornamental flowering plant, Phlox carolina has many cultivars such as "Minnie Pearl" with white flowers, "Kim" with pink flowers, "Gypsy Love," which is shorter than the others with pink flowers, and "Magnificence," which is taller than the others with purple-pink flowers. The most common cultivar is known as the "Miss Lingard," as known as wedding phlox, with white flowers and is a popular floral arrangement used for weddings.

== Common diseases ==
Phlox carolina is susceptible to black root rot from Berkeleyomyces (root rot fungi), Phytophthora blight and root rot caused by phytophthora (water molds). Other fungi diseases include Cotton root rot caused by Phymatotrichum omnivorum.

Phlox carolina can suffer from leaf spots caused by a number of different fungi ailments including Septoria divaricata, stem blight caused by members of Pyrenochaeta, and wilts caused by Verticillium albo-atrum.

Phlox carolina tends to be more resistant to powdery mildew than other phlox, especially in wild populations. Like most plants, Phlox carolina is susceptible to plant galls, specifically crown galls caused by Agrobacterium tumefaciens.

Phlox carolina is susceptible to several insect pest such as, the four-lined plant bug, Phlox plant bug, Lopidea plant bug, the oriental beetle, and spider mites.
