= Wild sweet William =

Wild sweet William may refer to:

- Phlox divaricata, native to eastern North America
- Phlox maculata, native to eastern North America
- Saponaria officinalis, native to Eurasia
