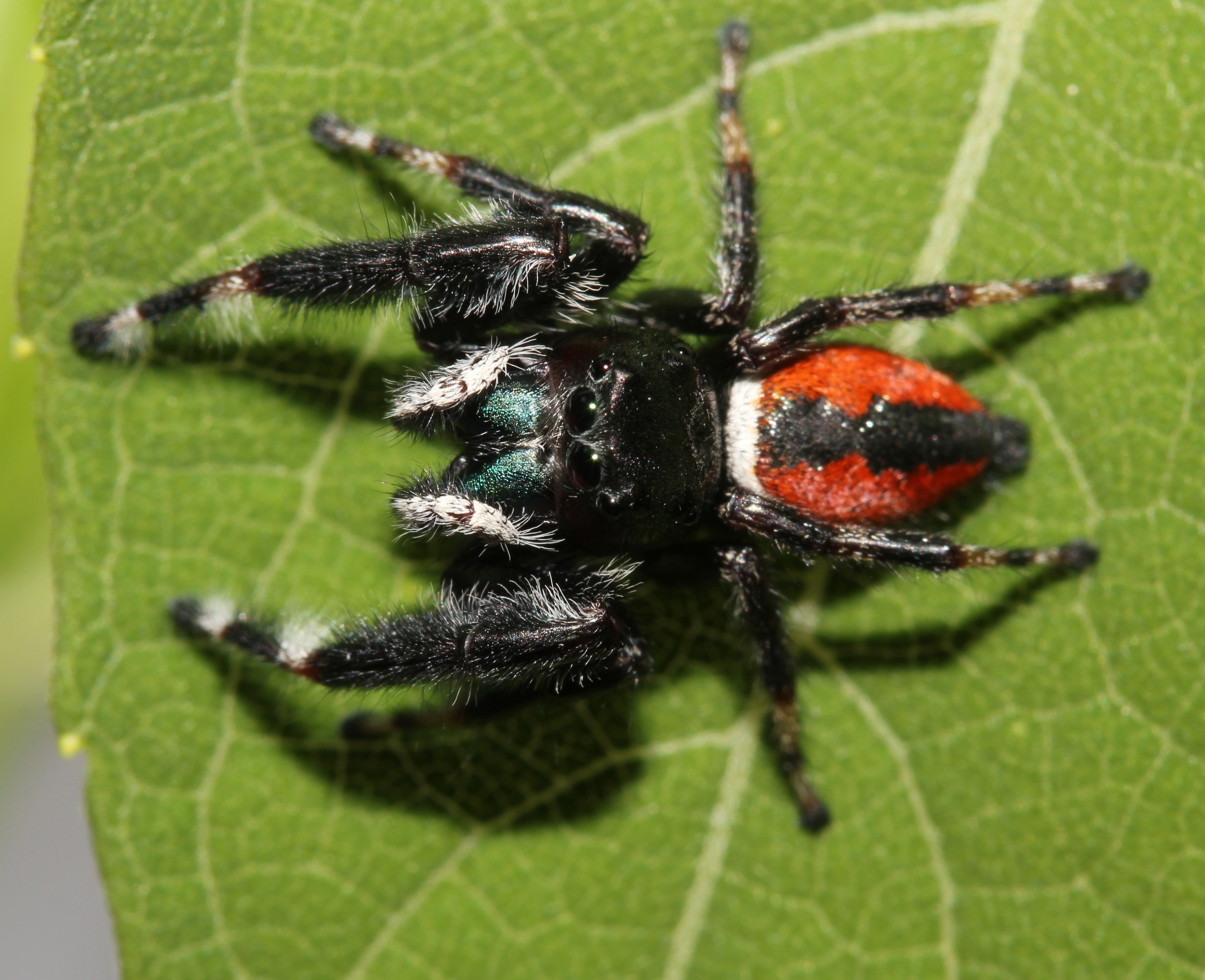
- Male
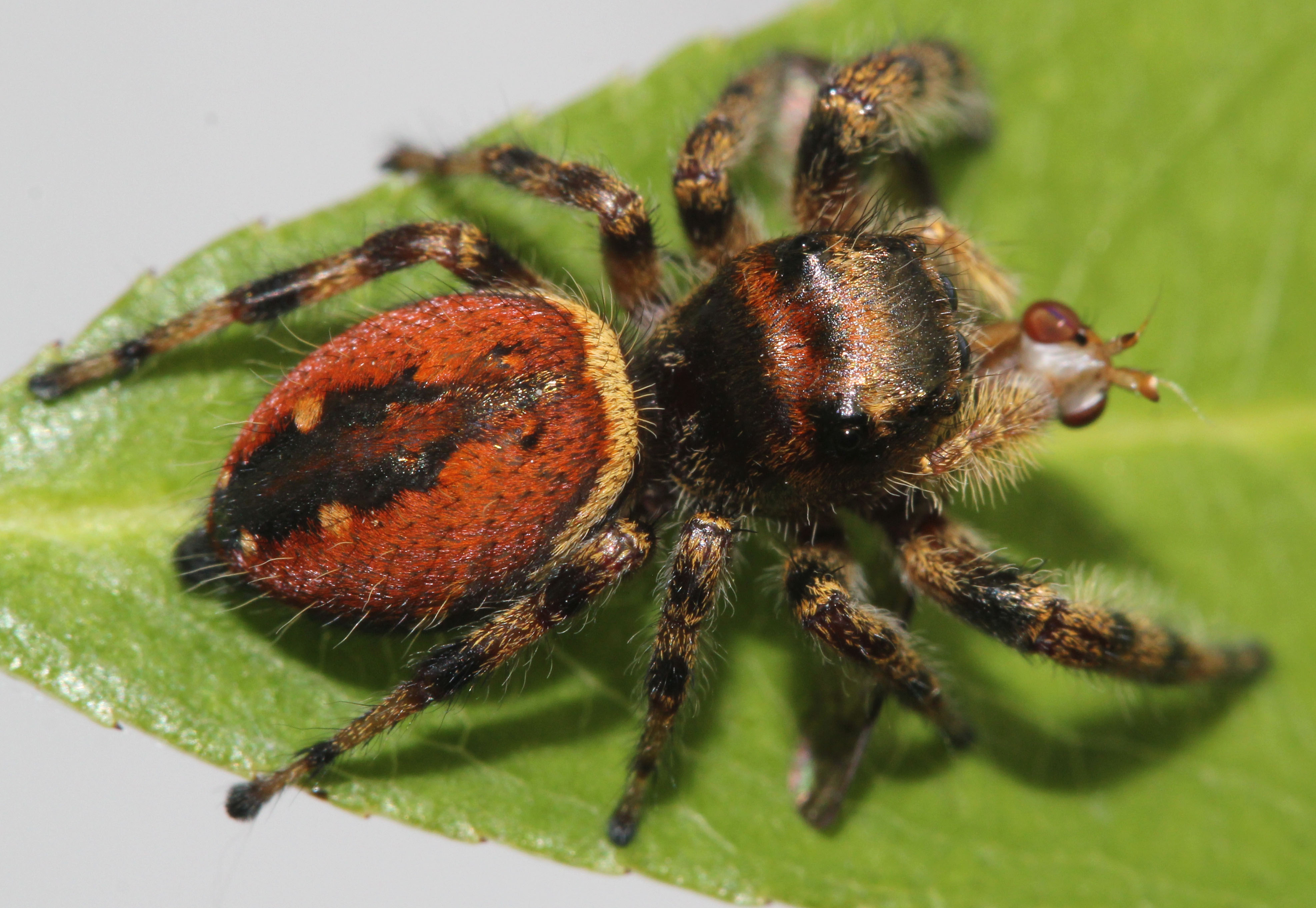
- Eastern female

Scientific classification
- Kingdom: Animalia
- Phylum: Arthropoda
- Subphylum: Chelicerata
- Class: Arachnida
- Order: Araneae
- Infraorder: Araneomorphae
- Family: Salticidae
- Genus: Phidippus
- Species: P. clarus

Binomial name
- Phidippus clarus Keyserling, 1884

= Phidippus clarus =

Species of spider

Phidippus clarus is found in North America

Phidippus clarus, also known as the brilliant jumping spider, is a species of jumping spider (family Salticidae) found in old fields throughout eastern North America. It often waits upside down near the top of a plant, which may be useful for detecting prey, and then quickly jumps down before the prey can escape. The spider is one of 60 species in the genus Phidippus, and one of about 5,000 in the Salticidae, a family that accounts for about 10% of all spider species. P. clarus is a predator, mostly consuming insects, other spiders, and other terrestrial arthropods.

P. clarus is a relatively large salticid that is able to take prey up to the size of an adult earwig. In an experiment, P. clarus was offered as many fruit flies as it could eat in a four-hour session. On average individuals took 17 flies, with the maximum amount taken was a striking 41.

When P. clarus males compete for females, the winners are those that produce the most vibrations on the surface and those that are largest. Contests between females involve less displaying, and physical fights between females are more likely to end in injury or death. The most successful males choose the largest females, as these females produce the most eggs and are the quickest at producing. If a female that has mated already finds another larger male, she will often mate again with the larger male. The average clutch is 135 eggs. Unlike most of the genus Phidippus, P. clarus females die after one brood has left the nest.

P. clarus is parasitized by the wasp Aporinellus completus and by mermithid nematodes. In an experiment in 2006, P. clarus showed promise for controlling the fourlined plant bug, Poecilocapsus lineatus, which severely damages the commercially grown sweet basil.

== Taxonomy ==
Phidippus clarus is one of the 60 species in the genus Phidippus, and one of about 5,000 in the Salticidae, a family that accounts for about 10% of all spider species.

== Description ==
Jumping spiders have a distinctive rectangular carapace, and that of female Phidippus clarus average 4.05 millimetres (0.159 in) wide, while the carapaces of males average 3.20 millimeters (0.126 in).

They are typically a red/brown coloration, but can sometimes be a lighter yellow or brown with darker markings on their bodies.

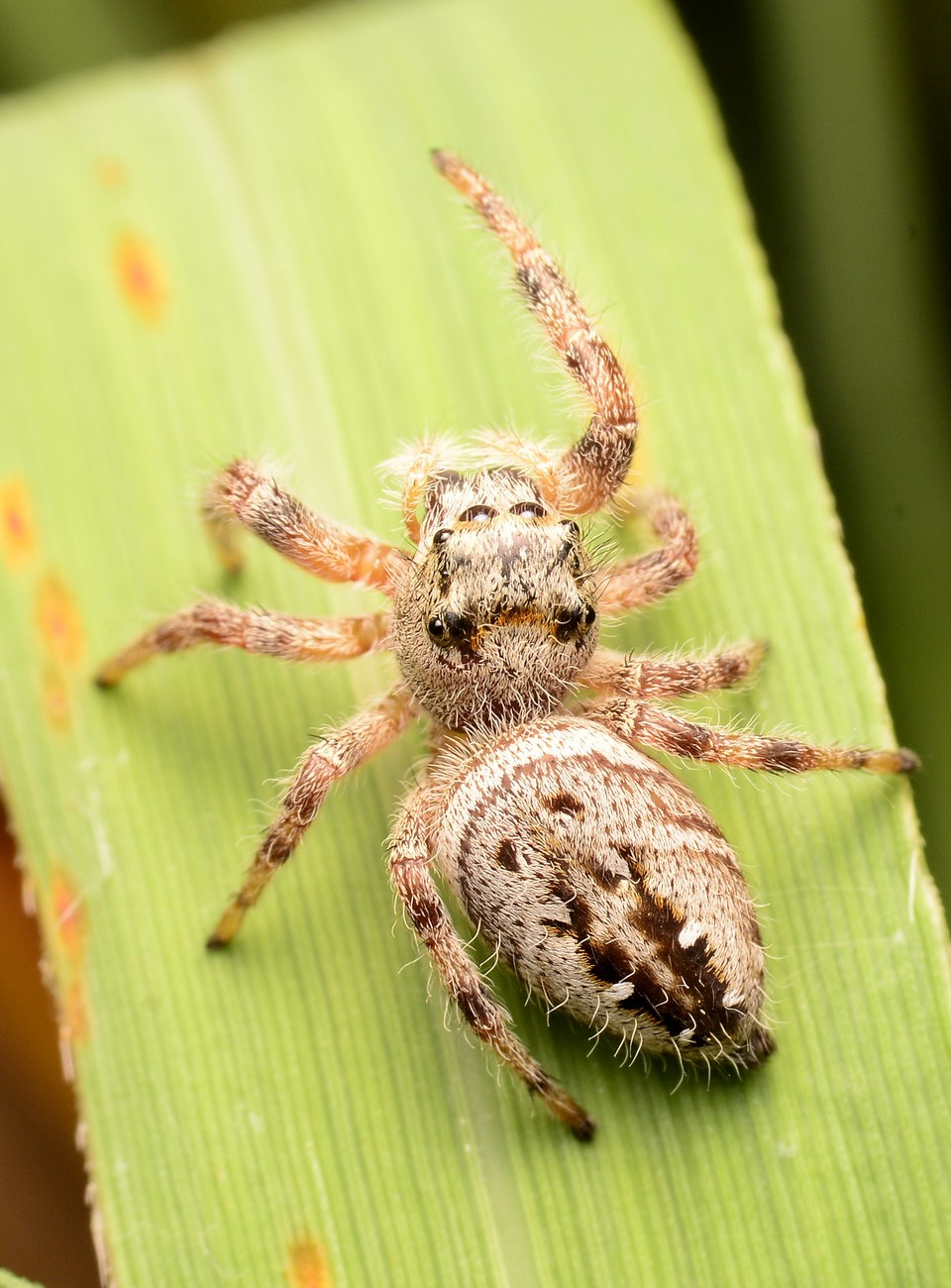
Adult female, western form

== Habitat and distribution ==
Phidippus clarus is found in old fields throughout most of the United States and southern Canada. It has also been recorded from western Mexico. It lives among flowers, often sharing habitats with the small to medium-sized crab spider Misumena vatia, which waits for prey. P. clarus often waits upside down near the top of a plant such as basil leaves, a position which may be useful for detecting prey and then quickly jumping down before the prey can escape. In a 2002 survey of jumping spiders in Minnesota, P. clarus accounted for 52% of the total found.

== Feeding ==
Almost all jumping spiders are predators, mostly preying on insects, other spiders, and other non-aquatic arthropods. The most-common procedure is sighting the prey, stalking, fastening a silk safety line to the surface, using the two pairs of back legs to jump on the victim, and finally biting the prey. Most jumping spiders walk throughout the day, so that they maximize their chances of a catch.

After capturing the prey, P. clarus settles in one spot and does not move again until it has discarded the undigestible hard remains of the prey. If P. clarus has gone without food for a few days, it eats slowly.

P. clarus, which is large by the standards of salticids, takes prey up to the size of an adult earwig. In an experiment, when jumping spider were offered as many fruit flies as they could eat within a 4-hour sessions, specimens took 17 flies on average - while one took 41. When the courtship display of wolf spider Schizocosa ocreata combines visual signals with vibrations, P. clarus responds to its wolf spider prey more quickly than when the wolf spider presents only one of the types of signal.

== Reproduction and lifecycle ==
=== Reproduction ===
Phidippus clarus becomes adult in early summer, and females about to lay eggs can weigh 400 milligrams (0.014 oz). Early in the breeding season, in early to mid-July, there are more males than females. The females all become sexually mature at the same time. At this point of the breeding season males die off, so that the number of males becomes equal to or slightly smaller than the number of females. By August, most females live in their nests overnight for increasing periods, as this is where they will lay eggs. The nests are located in rolled up leaves and are made of thick silk, which is expensive to build. The egg sacs are conspicuous, as they are made of such thick silk. Tests show that females use visual landmarks to return to their nests. A male only remains at the same nest when paired with a female.

Like other spiders and many other arthropods, P. clarus can vibrate surfaces to interact with others of its species, sometimes in conjunction with other communications such as movements, to intimidate rivals and who mates.

=== Brood size ===
One mated female P. clarus can lay well over 100 eggs per sac in a thick silken cocoon. An average clutch contains 135 eggs. Most females bear only one clutch of eggs, but some lay more. The females stay with the egg cocoon and usually die a few days after the spiderlings leave the nest.

=== Early life ===
The egg membrane is shed in 24–26 days, but the hatchlings (the first instar) continue to mature in the cocoon. The first molt occurs 24–28 days after the membrane is shed, and two to three days later the spiderlings leave their protective cover and become active, independent individuals. They do not hunt immediately, even if prey is available, but spend several hours engaged in apparently random activity before seeking cover, where they remain between two hours and two days. About 10% of spiderlings build retreats during this period, while the rest do so only after they have fed. The mothers usually die a few days after the spiderlings leave the nest.

== Mating ==
=== Male/male interactions ===
Competitions between P. clarus males occur on leaves up to 5 cm (2.0 in) long and wide, and the prize is the right to cohabit in the nest of a sub-adult female who is about enter her last molt and become fertile. Initially, the contending males use vibration and visual displays, and the number of vibration signals often determines which male wins. Males may use "leg-fencing", trying to push each other backwards with their front legs and bodies. Some of these contests escalate to grappling, in which males lock chelicerae (jaws) and legs for relatively longer periods. In contests, males with previous experience of winning are more likely to win later contests, and males with more experience of losing are more likely to lose in future. In both winners and losers, more recent experience is more important than earlier experience. However, the weights of the contenders has the most influence, and experience makes a difference only between individuals of similar size.

=== Female/female interactions ===
In contests between P. clarus females, the preliminaries are longer but ritualized displays are rare. Physical fights between females are more likely to end in injury or death.

=== Female/male interaction ===
==== Pheromones ====
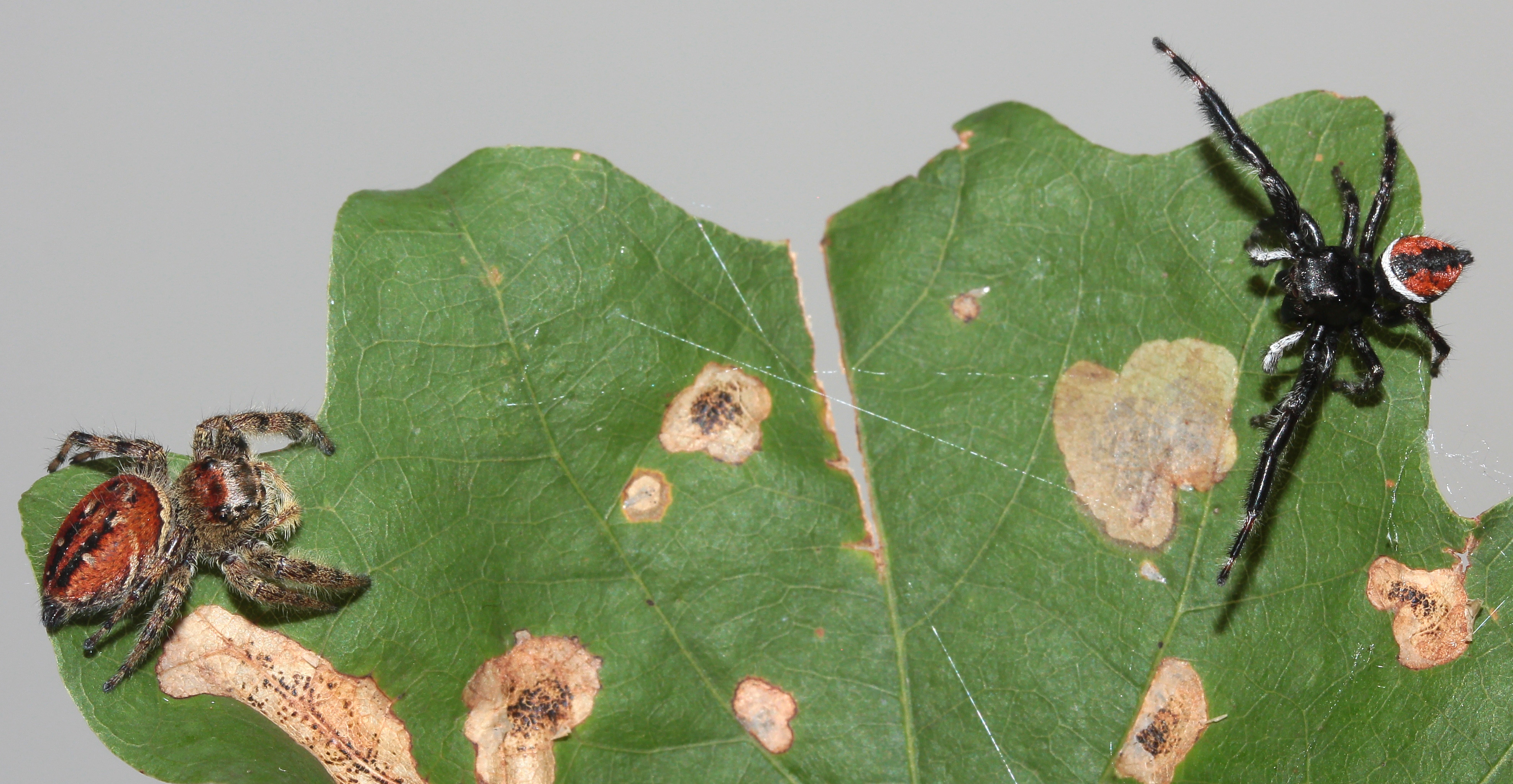
Courtship of Phidippus clarus

Males of P. clarus can detect females' size and age based on pheromones and other chemicals left in females' silk, and males use this information to choose mates. Males prefer to cohabit with large females, which mature more quickly and have more offspring than smaller ones. The largest males are the most aggressive and thus the largest males and females mate, and so on in order of size.

==== Courting ====
When P. clarus males find females, the males court by waving their legs and making their abdomens vibrate against the substrate (leaves, the ground, etc.). Males will court immature and adult virgin females, and also previously mated females. As the male dances, he approaches the female and touches the female cautiously once or twice. The female rejects the male by extending her first pair of legs whenever he approaches too closely, or shows acceptance by not blocking his advance. If accepted, the male climbs over her and uses his forelegs to turn her abdomen to the side. The turn exposes her genital pore, which lies on the underside of the abdomen, and the male inserts one semen-laden pedipalp. After two or three minutes the male withdraws this pedipalp, turns the female's abdomen the other way and inserts the other pedipalp.Some P. clarus females mate with more than one male. In these females, copulations after the first occur after longer courtships. This shows that already-mated females are less receptive to mates, and suggests that females may be trading up in subsequent matings.

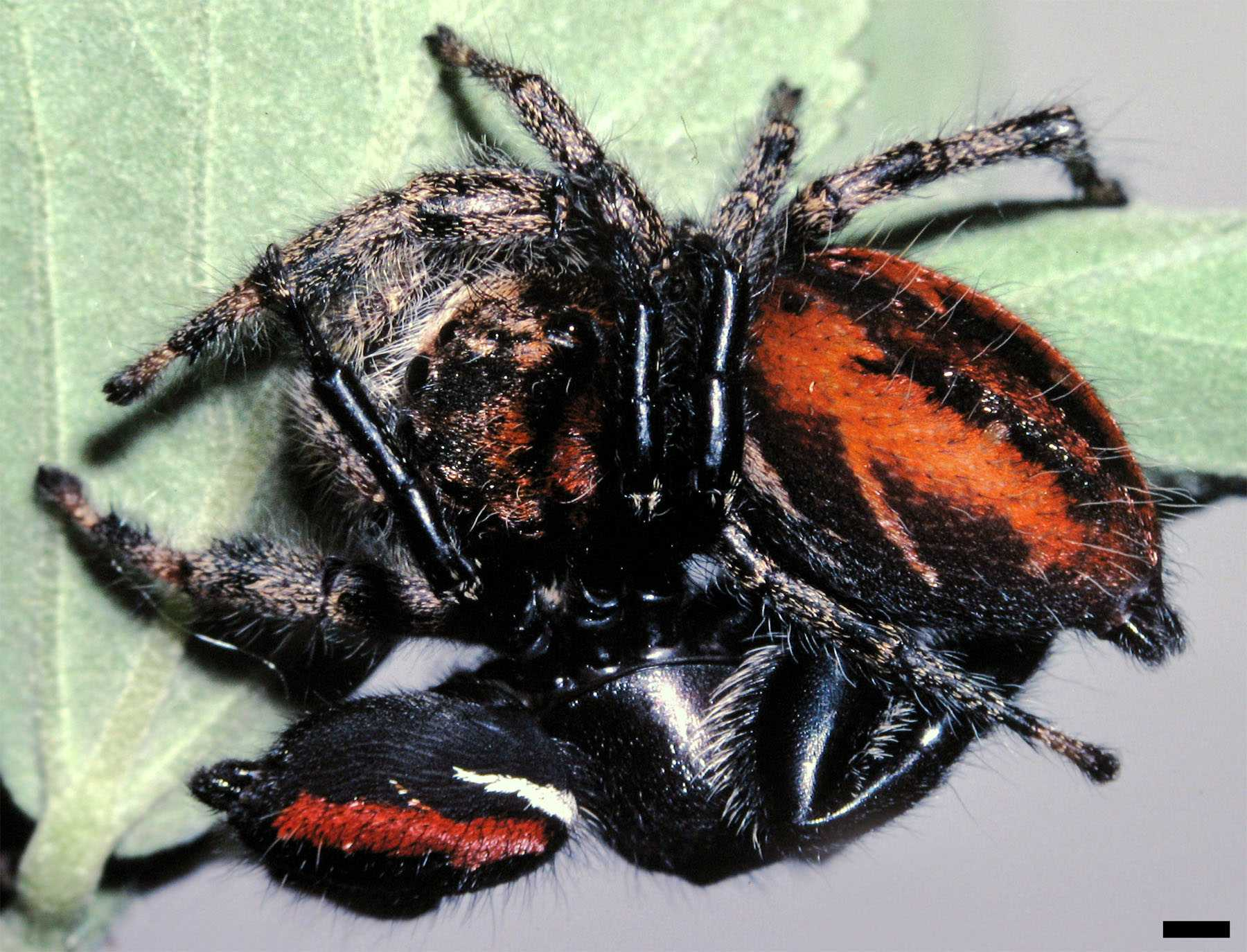
Male and female Phidippus clarus mating

== Enemies ==
=== Parasites ===
The Californian wasp Aporinellus completus parasitizes P. clarus by paralyzing the spider and attaching an egg to the spider's abdomen. Mermithid nematodes infest P. clarus and many other spiders, typically severely damaging the main muscles, the digestive system and the reproductive system.

== Biocontrol ==
In an experiment in 2006, P. clarus showed promise for controlling the fourlined plant bug, Poecilocapsus lineatus, which severely damages sweet basil, Ocimum basilicum, a herb commercially grown in greenhouses. The potential advantages of P. clarus for biocontrol include: it prefers to stay overnight in the same nest, it is able to detect prey visually from a distance, it is able to take a wide range of prey, it can both wait for prey and hunt actively, it is able to learn and recognize particular prey, and it can be reared in individual cages. Although cannibalism is likely to prevent mass rearing of P. clarus, it is possible to collect egg sacs or spiders and move them to where they are needed. In the breeding season, one mated female can lay well over 100 eggs per sac; many females lay more than one egg sac, and it is easy to recognize the egg sacs. Juvenile and adult jumping spiders can be collected via sweep netting or by providing good sites for nests, even in plumber's tubing placed in old fields.
