= Marsh phlox =

Marsh phlox may refer to several species in the genus Phlox:

- Phlox glaberrima, also called smooth phlox
  - Especially Phlox glaberrima subsp. interior, the Wabash smooth phlox
- Phlox maculata, also called meadow phlox
- Phlox kelseyi, Kelsey's phlox
