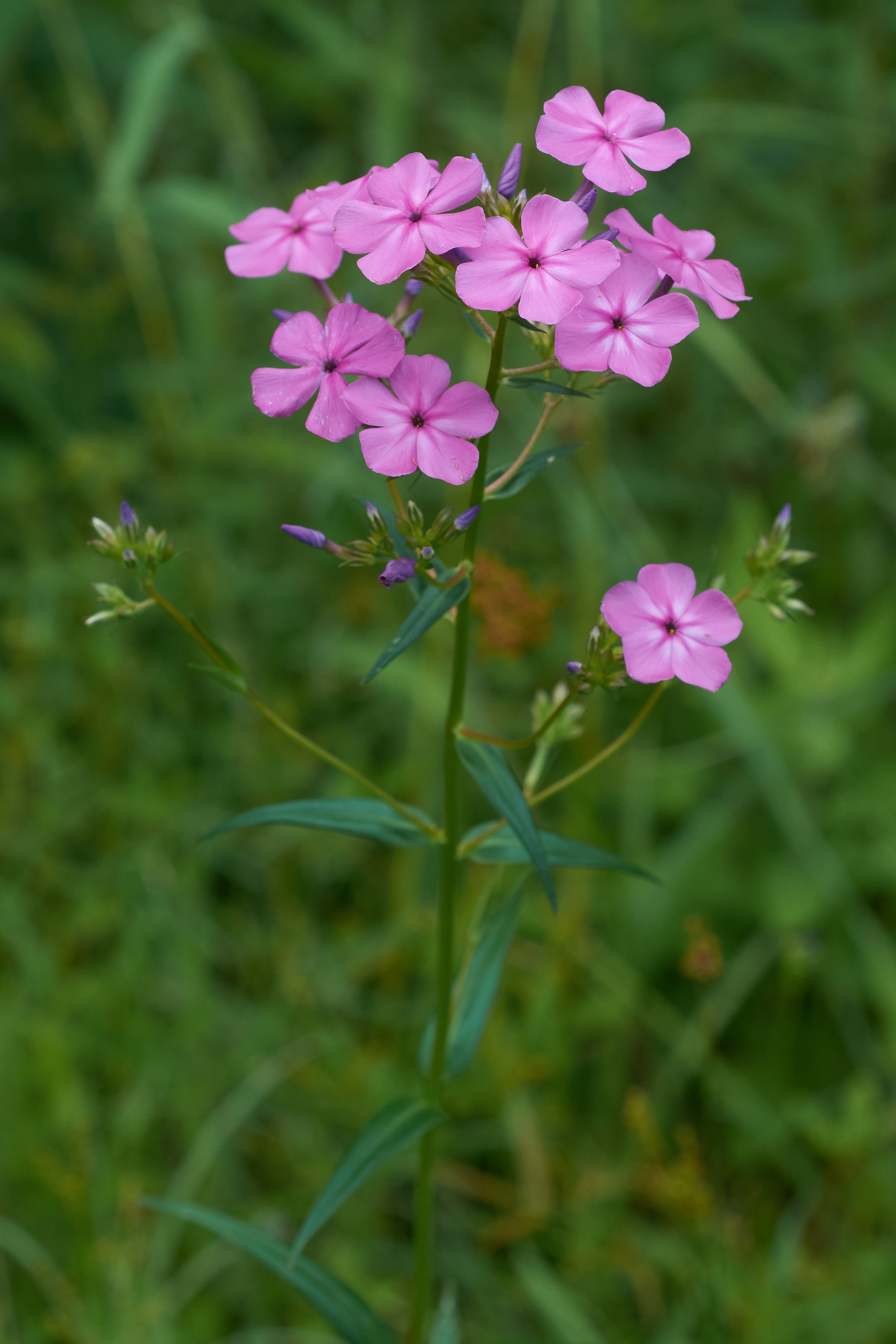

Scientific classification
- Kingdom: Plantae
- Clade: Tracheophytes
- Clade: Angiosperms
- Clade: Eudicots
- Clade: Asterids
- Order: Ericales
- Family: Polemoniaceae
- Genus: Phlox
- Species: P. glaberrima

Binomial name
- Phlox glaberrima L.

= Phlox glaberrima =

Species of flowering plant

Phlox glaberrima, commonly called smooth phlox and sometimes marsh phlox, (Note: "Marsh phlox" also refers to P. maculata and P. kelseyi.) is a species of flowering plant in the phlox family. It is native to the Midwestern and Southeastern United States where it is found in moist to wet areas. It can be found in both prairies and forests, where it is an indicator of high quality habitat.

The relationships between Phlox glaberrima, Phlox carolina, and Phlox maculata are particularly unclear. There may be hybridization, or an undescribed third species that resembles an intermediate. As of 2014, the phylogenetic relationships of this group of Phlox were under review, with variations in the "Phlox carolina–glaberrima complex...among the most difficult phlox plants to positively identify".

Botanist Edgar T. Wherry (1955) recognized three subspecies, subsp. glaberrima in its eastern range, subsp. interior of the Plains (the Wabash smooth phlox) and subsp. triflora (syn. P. triflora, the three-flower smooth phlox) in the South, but Locklear (2012) only two, incorporating subsp. triflora with subsp. glaberrima.

The glaberrima and interior variations, along with other taxa in the P. carolina–glaberrima complex and P. maculata, are frequently cultivated as ornamental landscape plants, but triflora rarely is. Notable cultivars include P. glaberrima 'Morris Berd', P. glaberrima ssp. triflora 'Forever Pink' and P. glaberrima ssp. triflora 'Triple Play'.
