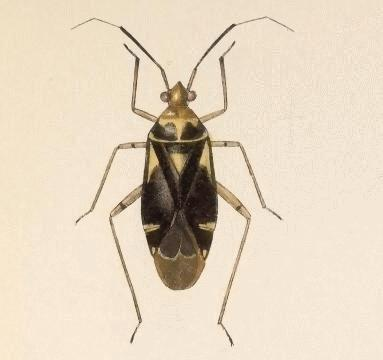
- Poecilocapsus ornatulus

Scientific classification
- Kingdom: Animalia
- Phylum: Arthropoda
- Class: Insecta
- Order: Hemiptera
- Suborder: Heteroptera
- Family: Miridae
- Genus: Poecilocapsus; Reuter, 1876

= Poecilocapsus =

Genus of true bugs

Poecilocapsus is a genus of bugs in the family Miridae. The size of these species is from 6–8 millimetres (0.24–0.31 in) and can be found in North America.

== Species ==
The following species are recognised in the genus Poecilocapsus:

- Poecilocapsus alacer (Stal, 1862)
- Poecilocapsus citrinus Carvalho & Hussey, 1954
- Poecilocapsus fremontii S.Scudder, 1890
- Poecilocapsus lineatus (Fabricius, 1798)
- Poecilocapsus mollis Distant, 1893
- Poecilocapsus nigriger (Stal, 1862)
- Poecilocapsus ornatulus (Stal, 1862)
- Poecilocapsus ostentus S.Scudder, 1890
- Poecilocapsus tabidus S.Scudder, 1890
- Poecilocapsus veterandus S.Scudder, 1890
- Poecilocapsus veternosus S.Scudder, 1890
