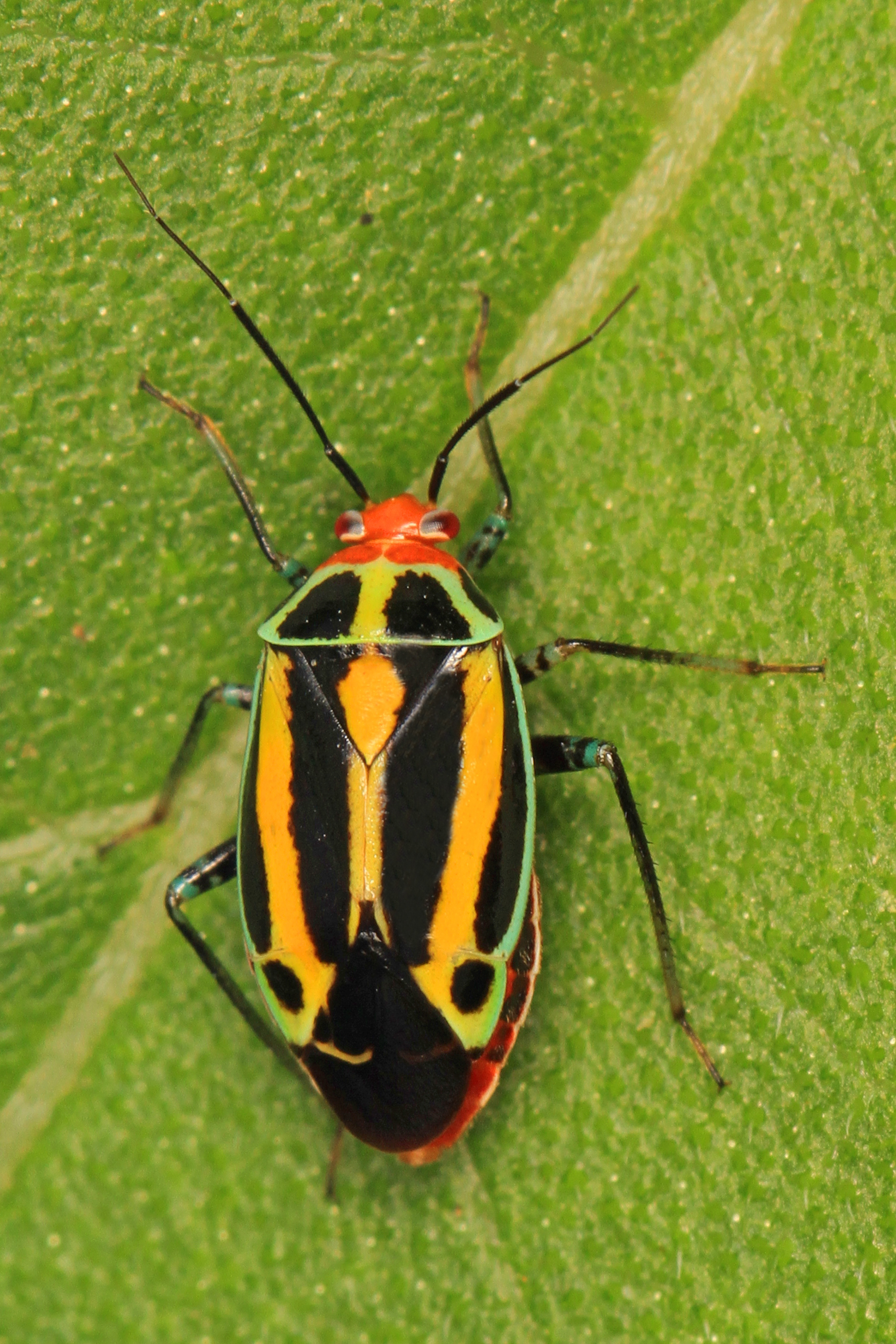

Scientific classification
- Kingdom: Animalia
- Phylum: Arthropoda
- Class: Insecta
- Order: Hemiptera
- Suborder: Heteroptera
- Family: Miridae
- Genus: Poecilocapsus
- Species: P. lineatus

Binomial name
- Poecilocapsus lineatus Fabricius, 1798

Synonyms
- Lygaeus lineatus Fabricius, 1798; Capsus quadrivittatus Say, 1832; Phytocoris bellus Emmons, 1854; Phytocoris vittatus Rathvon, 1869; Phytocoris lineatus (Fabricius, 1798); Fitch, 1870; Lygus lineatus (Fabricius, 1798); Glover, 1875; Poecilocapsus lineatus (Fabricius, 1798); Reuter, 1875; Poecilacapsus [sic] vittatus (Rathvon, 1869); Uhler, 1884; Poscilocapsus [sic] lineatus (Fabricius, 1798); LaFollette, 1915

= Poecilocapsus lineatus =

Species of true bug

Poecilocapsus lineatus, commonly known as the fourlined plant bug, is a species of true bug (Hemiptera) in the family Miridae. This species is native to the United States and Canada.

== Description ==
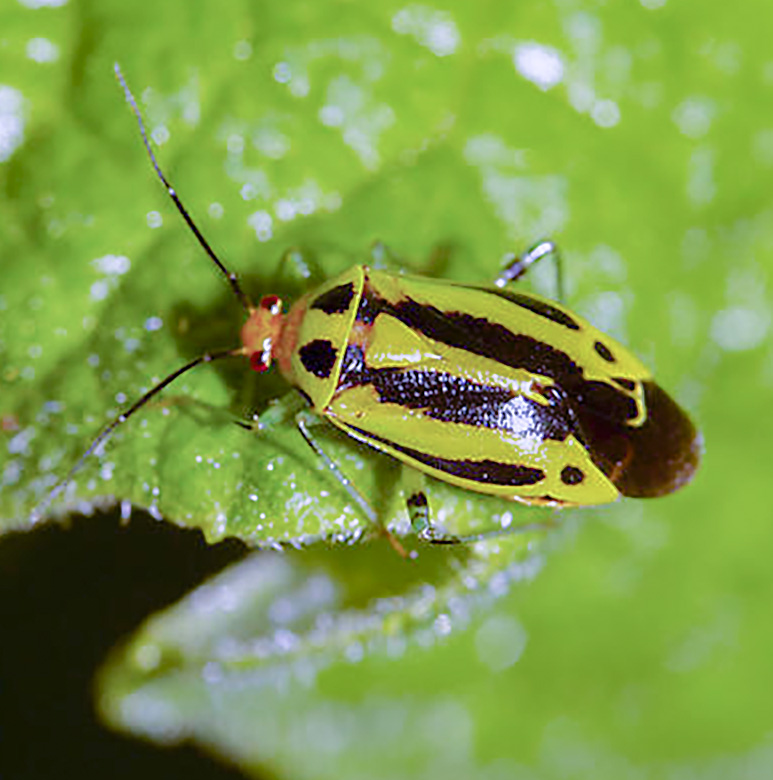
Four-lined Plant Bug (Poecilocapsus lineatus)

The adults are about 7–7.5 millimetres (0.28–0.30 in) in length and 3.5 millimetres (0.14 in) in width. Adults have four distinct black lines against a background color ranging from green to yellow, with an orange head and prominent, dark red eyes. Nymphs grow rapidly through five instars, with wing pads growing at each molt. Nymphs are a bright red color with black markings, except for the last instar which is bright orange.

== Ecology ==
This species has a wide host range, but shows strong preference for plants in the mint and composite families (Lamiaceae and Asteraceae). Various herbaceous perennials and shrubs in these families are favored for reproduction and account for the majority of damage observed in the landscape and garden, although vegetables are also sometimes damaged. Both nymphs and adults feed on leaves creating the water-soaked patches of leaf tissues that may later dry up or fall out to produce tiny holes.

== Life cycle ==
This species has only one generation per year. They overwinter in the egg stage, hatching in mid to late spring. Both sexes mate within six weeks after hatching. The timing of egg hatch and development varies. In southern Pennsylvania the eggs hatched from mid to late April, with adults being seen by late May. In the northern part of the same state, the development was 1–3 weeks later. This is also true elsewhere: in the city of Lafayette in Indiana, the development was 2–3 weeks earlier than it was in Ithaca, New York.

Late stage nymphs and adult fourlined plant bug on thistle (family (Asteraceae)

== Pest ==
The insect is considered to be a minor pest, since it occasionally does damage to herbaceous plants, especially mints, and rarely to woody shrubs or small trees, including forsythia, dogwood, wild hydrangea, and sumac. The species damages plants during the late spring to early summer, with the nymphs causing the majority of plant damage as they feed and develop.
