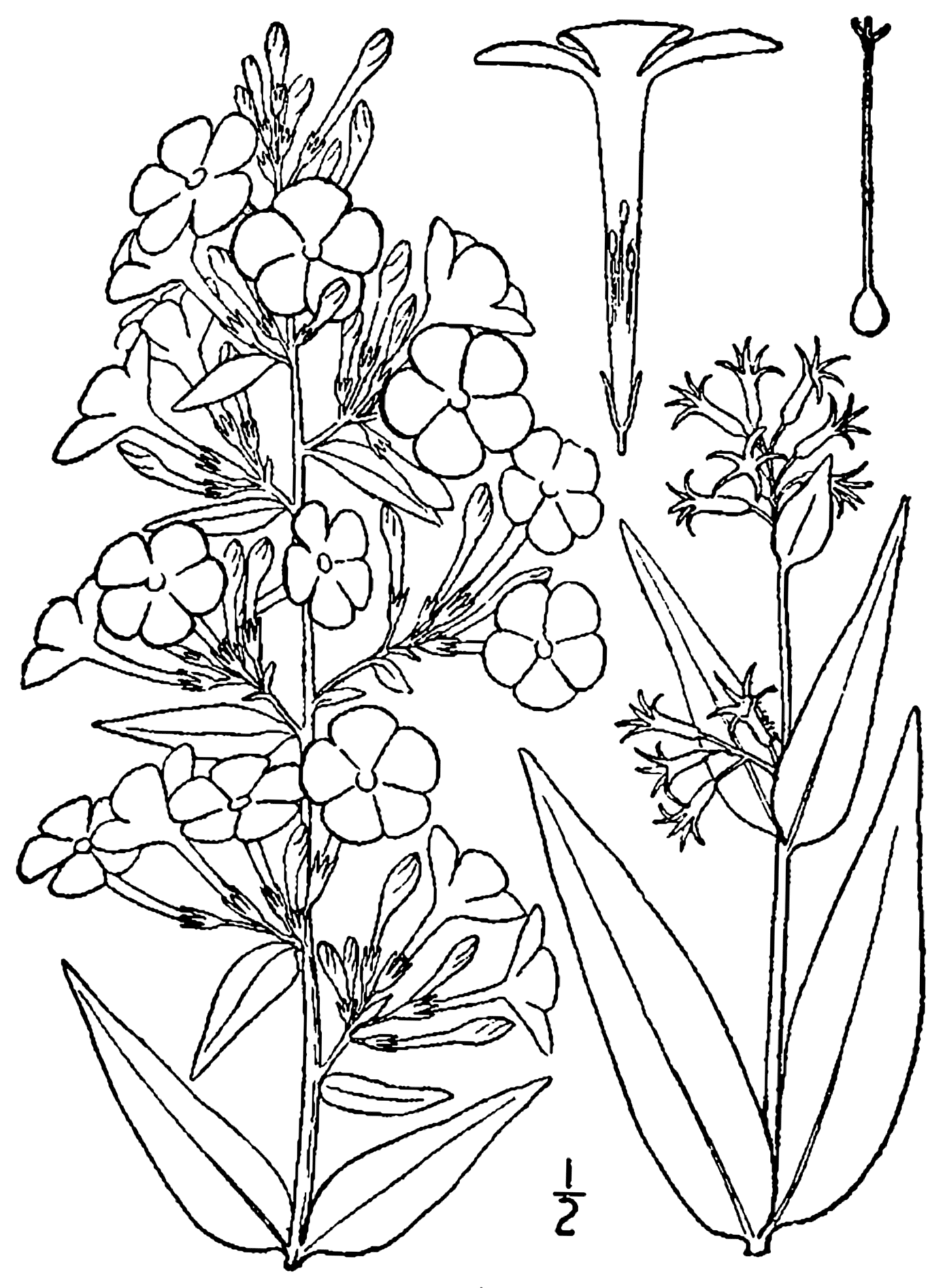

Scientific classification
- Kingdom: Plantae
- Clade: Tracheophytes
- Clade: Angiosperms
- Clade: Eudicots
- Clade: Asterids
- Order: Ericales
- Family: Polemoniaceae
- Genus: Phlox
- Species: P. maculata

Binomial name
- Phlox maculata L.

= Phlox maculata =

Species of flowering plant

Phlox maculata, commonly called meadow phlox, as well as wild sweet William and marsh phlox, (Note: "Marsh phlox" also refers to P. glaberrima and P. kelseyi.) is a species of flowering plant in the family Polemoniaceae, native the eastern United States and introduced to eastern Canada. It is a perennial.

Growing to 2–3 ft (61–91 cm), this erect, clump-forming herbaceous perennial produces clusters of fragrant, deep pink flowers in summer. The stiff stems are spotted red, hence the Latin specific epithet maculata. It prefers damp, well-drained soil in full sun. It is less prone to powdery mildew than the related Phlox paniculata.

The following cultivars have received the Royal Horticultural Society's Award of Garden Merit:

- 'Alpha' (lilac)
- 'Natascha' (pink and white)
- 'Omega' (white with a red eye)
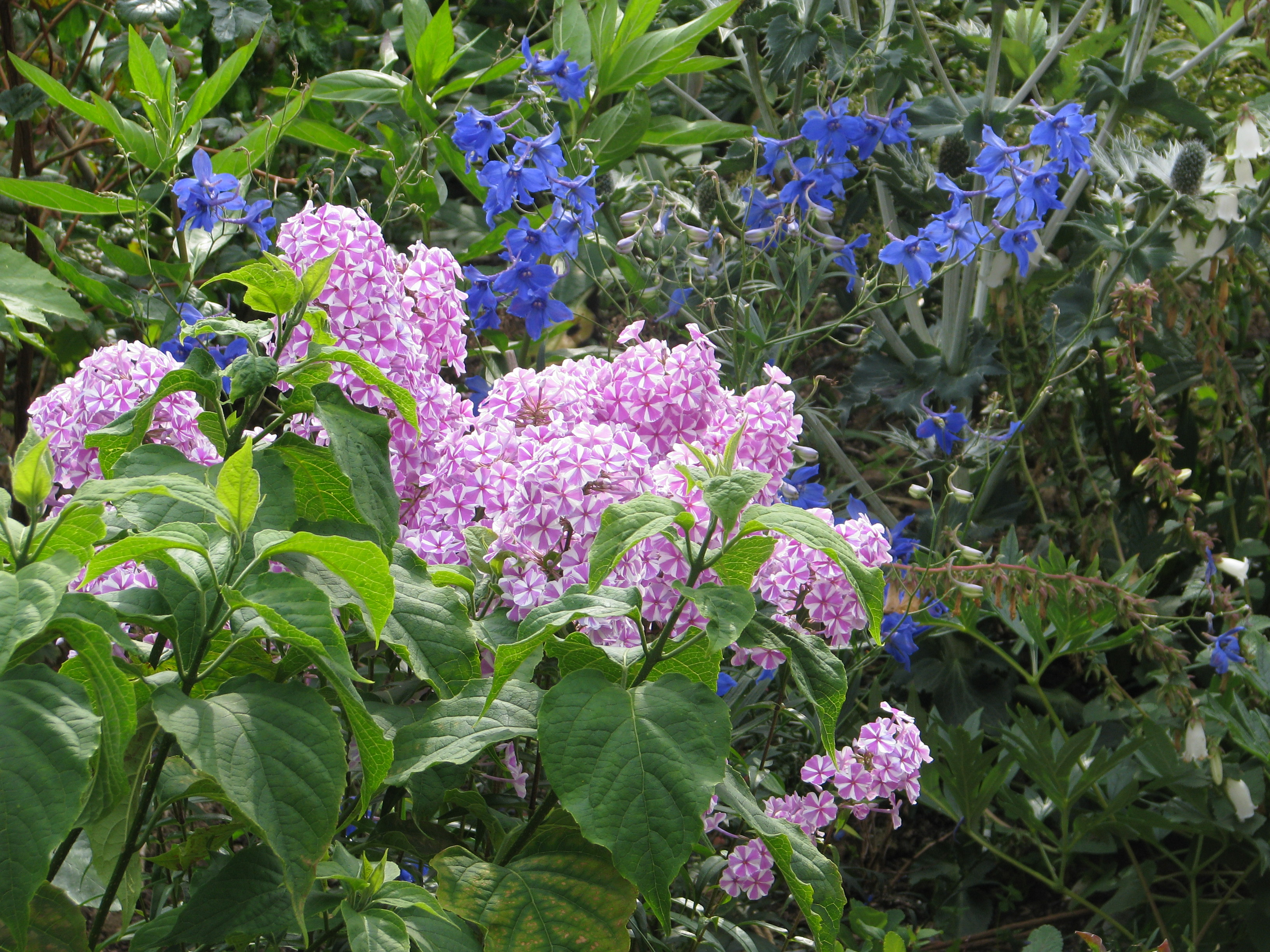

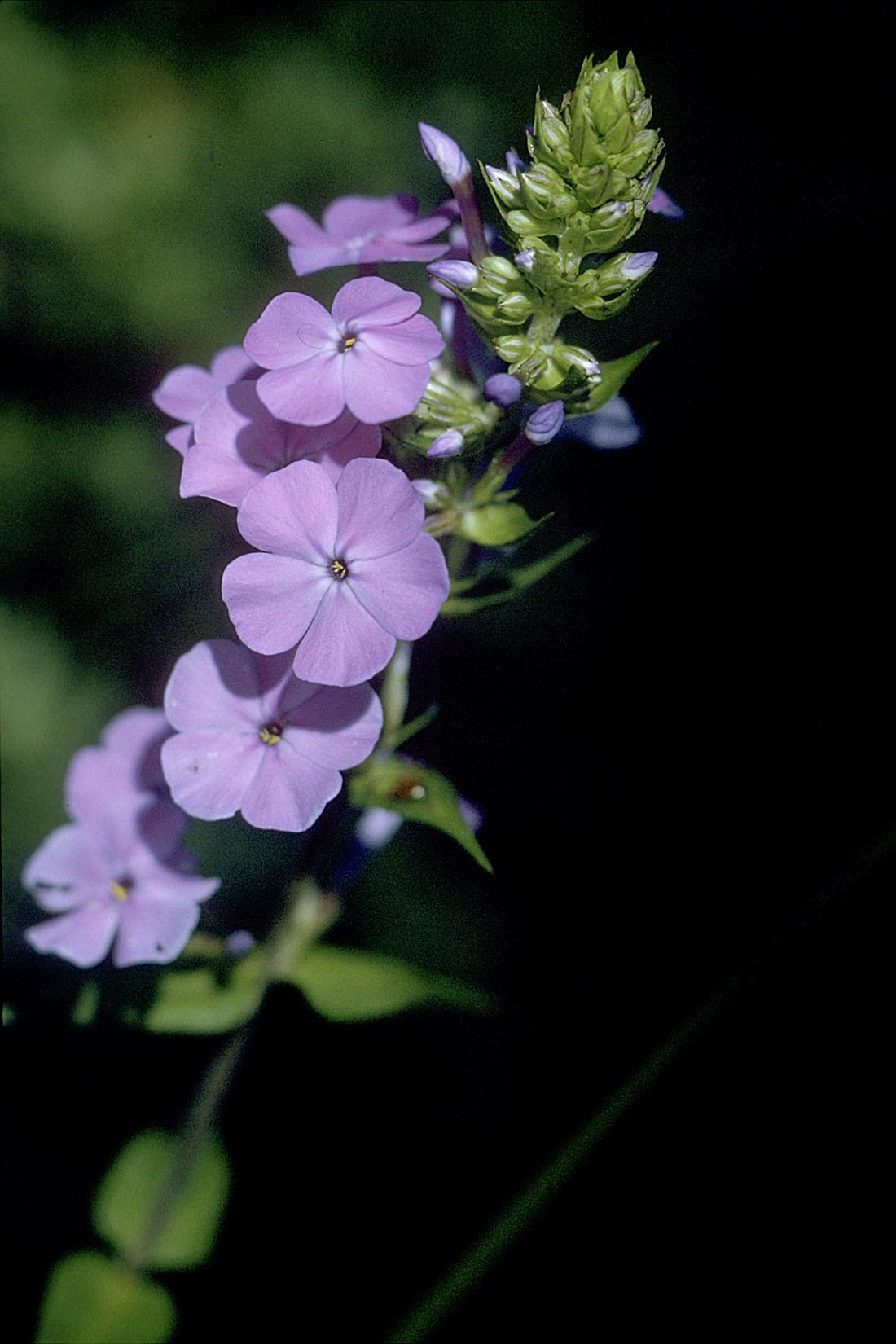

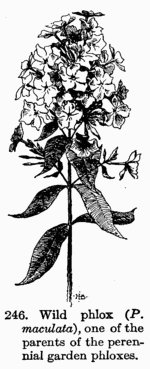
Botanical illustration

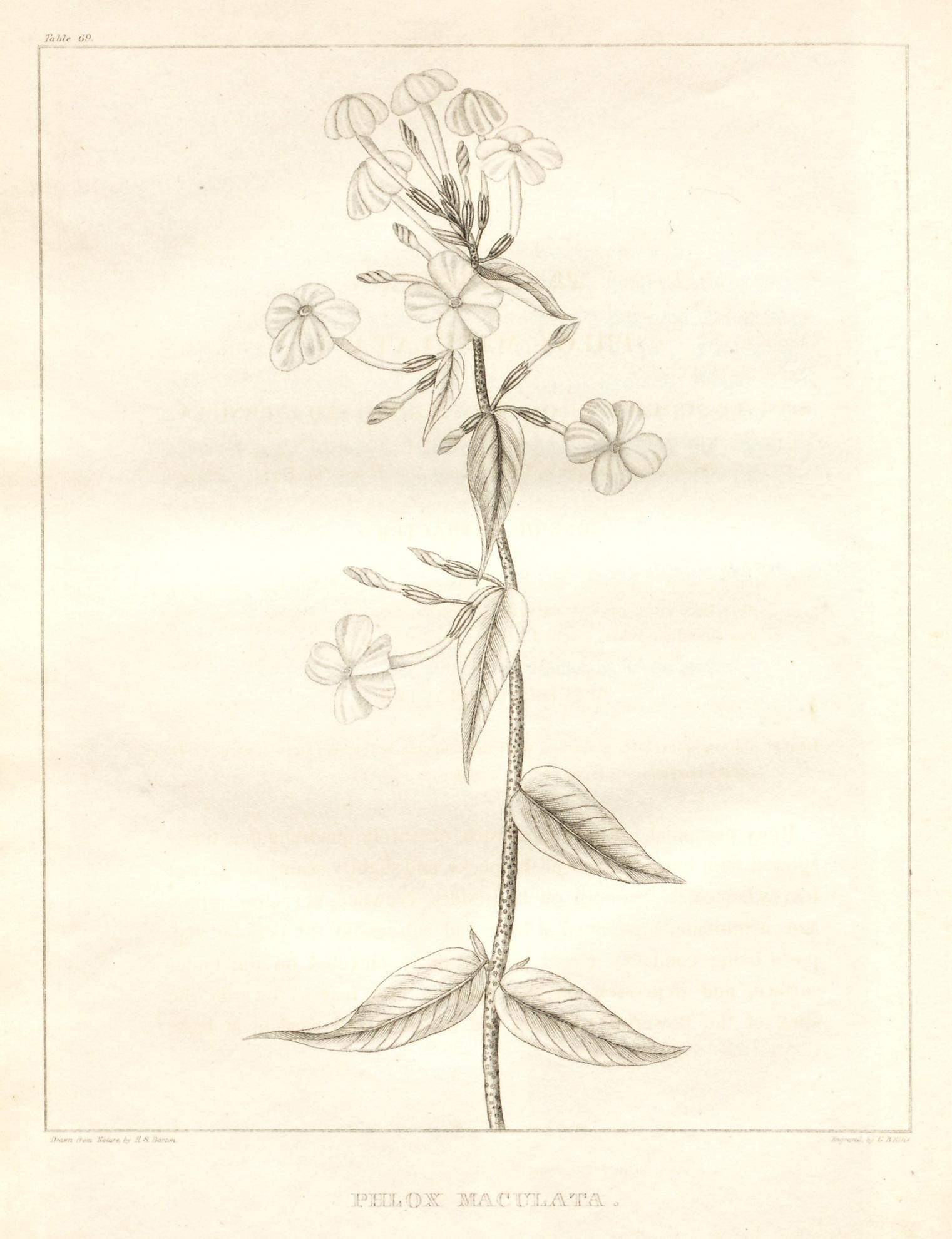
Botanical illustration
